= History of rail transport =

Description of rail transport modernisation

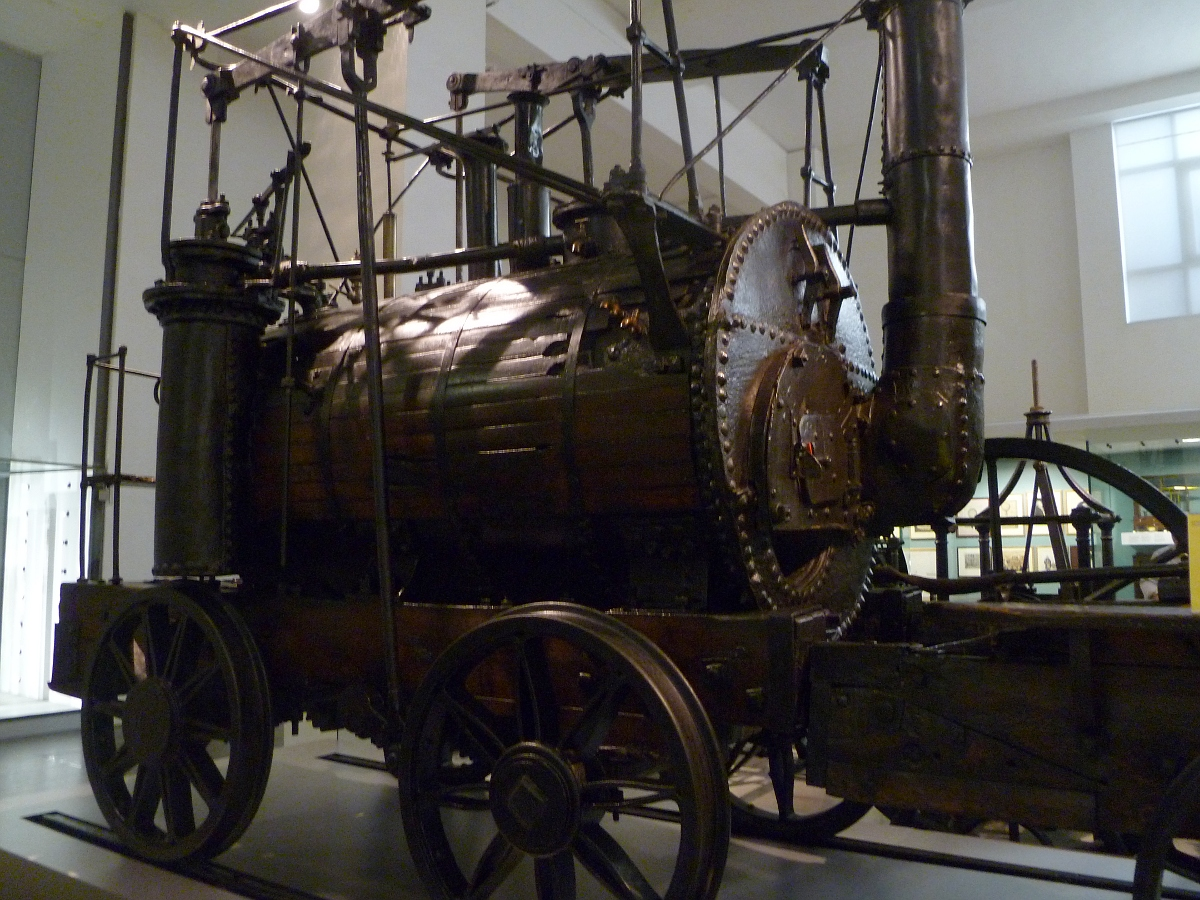
"Puffing Billy", the oldest surviving steam locomotive in the UK.

The history of rail transport began before the common era. It can be divided into several discrete periods, defined by the principal track material and power used.

== Ancient systems ==
The Post Track, a prehistoric causeway in the valley of the River Brue in the Somerset Levels, England, is one of the oldest known constructed trackways and dates from around 3838 BC, making it some 30 years older than the Sweet Track in the same area. Various sections have been designated as scheduled monuments.

Evidence indicates that there was a 6-to-8.5-kilometre-long (3.7 to 5.3 mi) paved trackway (Diolkos), which transported boats across the Isthmus of Corinth in Greece from around 600 BC. Wheeled vehicles pulled by men and animals ran in grooves indented in the limestone, which were meant to hold the wagon wheels in place & to travel in a straight direction. The Diolkos was in use for over 650 years, until at least the 1st century AD. Paved trackways were also later built in Roman Egypt.

== Pre-steam ==
=== Wooden rails introduced ===
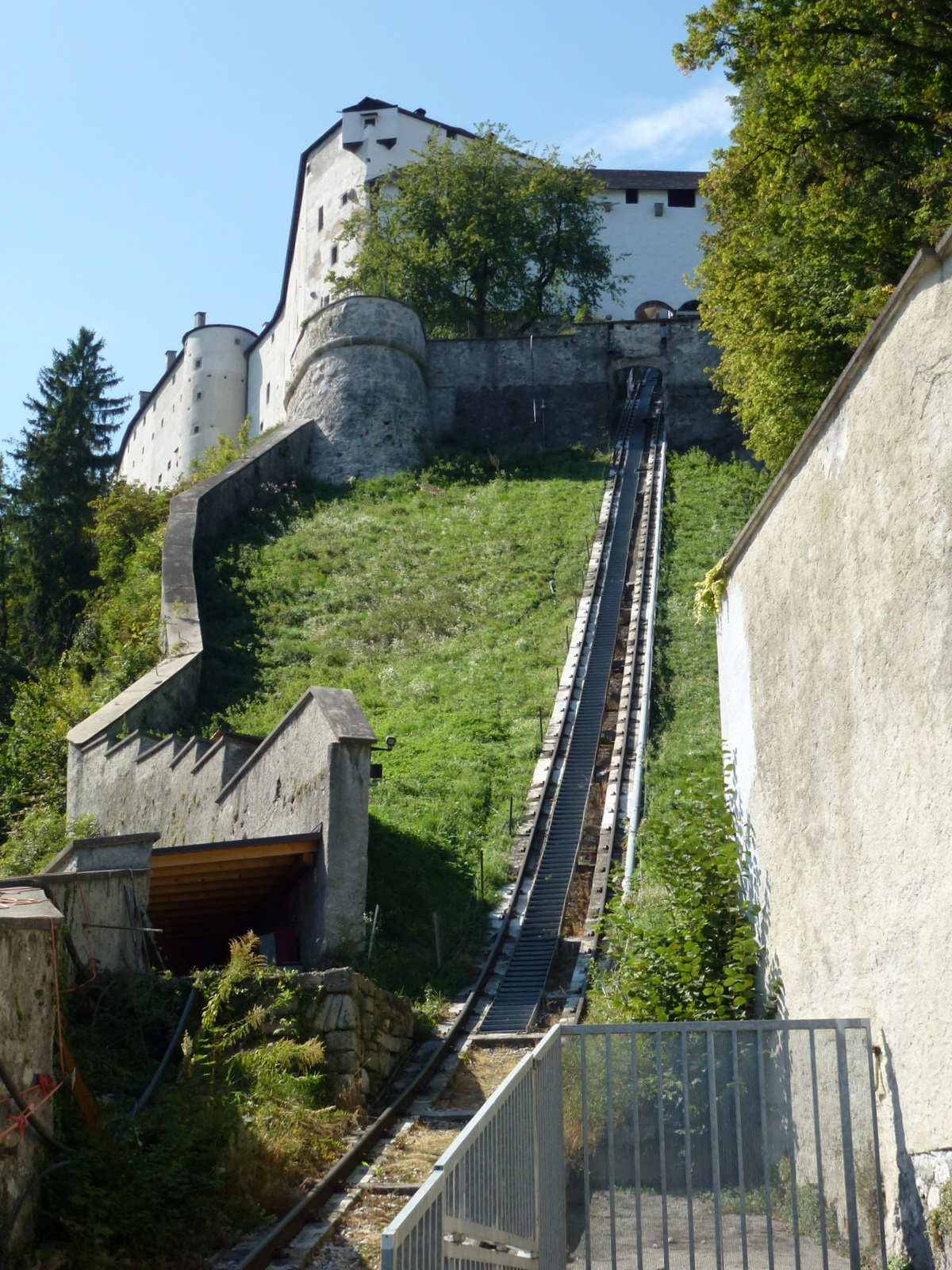
Salzburg's Reisszug, as it appears today

In 1515, Cardinal Matthäus Lang wrote a description of the Reisszug, a funicular railway at the Hohensalzburg Fortress in Austria. The line originally used wooden rails and a hemp haulage rope and was operated by human or animal power through a treadwheel. The line still exists today and remains operational, though in updated form. It may be the oldest operational railway.

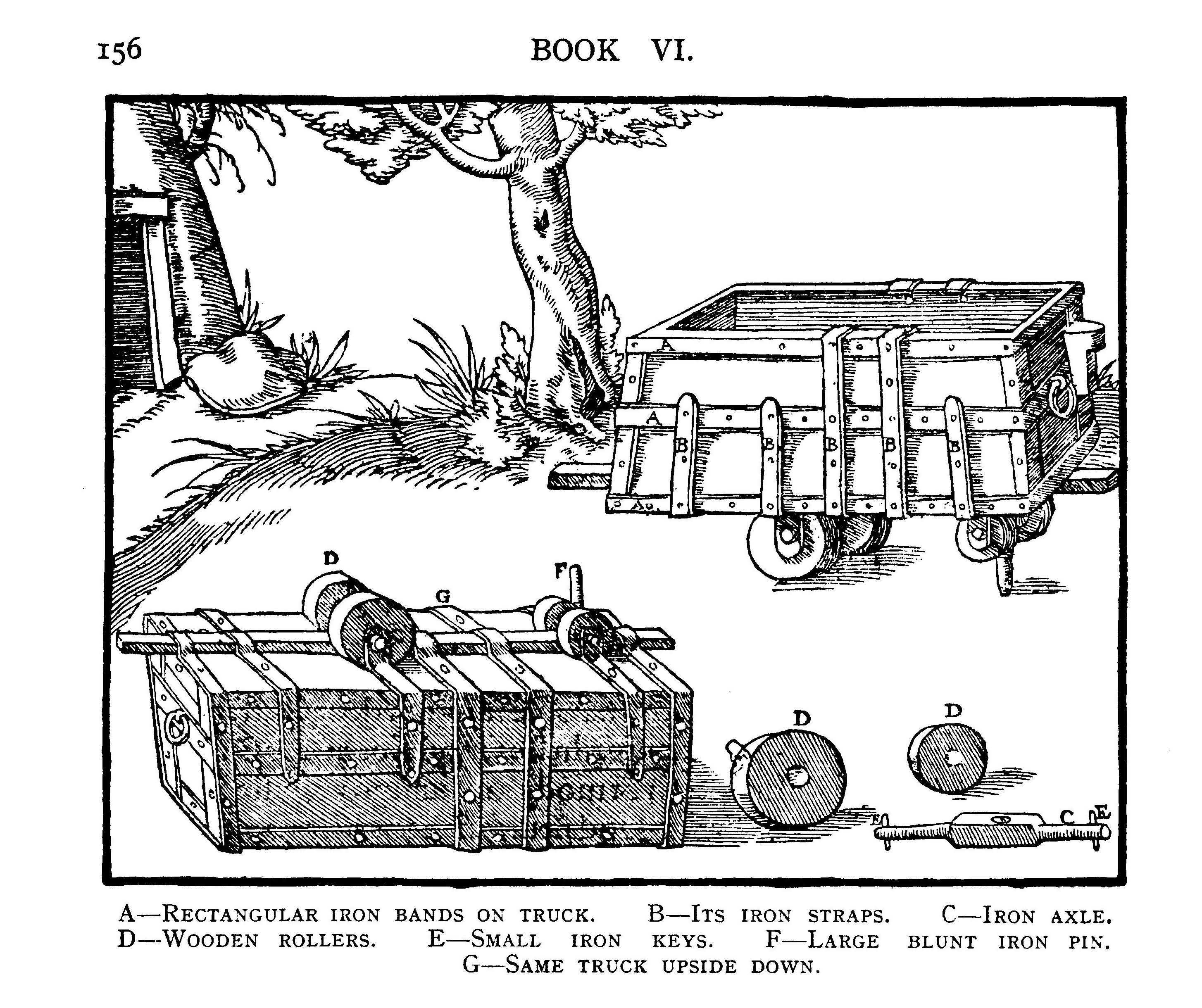
Minecart shown in De Re Metallica (1556). The guide pin fits in a groove between two wooden planks.

Wagonways (or tramways), with wooden rails and horse-drawn traffic, were used in the 1550s to facilitate transportation of ore tubs to and from mines. They soon became popular in Europe, and Georgius Agricola illustrated their operation in his 1556 work De re metallica (see image). This line used "Hund" carts with unflanged wheels running on wooden planks and a vertical pin on the truck fitting into the gap between the planks to keep it going the right way. The miners called the wagons Hunde (meaning "dogs") from the noise they made on the tracks. There are many references to wagonways in central Europe in the 16th century.

A wagonway was introduced to England by German miners at Caldbeck, Cumbria, possibly in the 1560s. This underground wagonway is the earliest known evidence for the use of tracked transport in Britain. A wagonway was built at Prescot, near Liverpool, sometime around 1600, possibly as early as 1594. Owned by Philip Layton, the line carried coal from a pit near Prescot Hall to a terminus about half a mile away. The Wollaton Wagonway, completed in 1604 by Huntingdon Beaumont, was the earliest British railway, excluding systems using a guided pin. It ran from Strelley to Wollaton near Nottingham. Several funicular railways (counter-balanced trains on a slope, linked by rope) were set up at Broseley in Shropshire from October 1605. Another line constructed in April 1606, carried coal for James Clifford from his mines down to the river Severn to be loaded onto barges and carried to riverside towns.

The Middleton Railway in Leeds, which was built in 1758, later became the world's oldest operational railway (other than funiculars), albeit now in an upgraded form. In 1764, the first railway in the Americas was built in Lewiston, New York.

=== Metal rails introduced ===
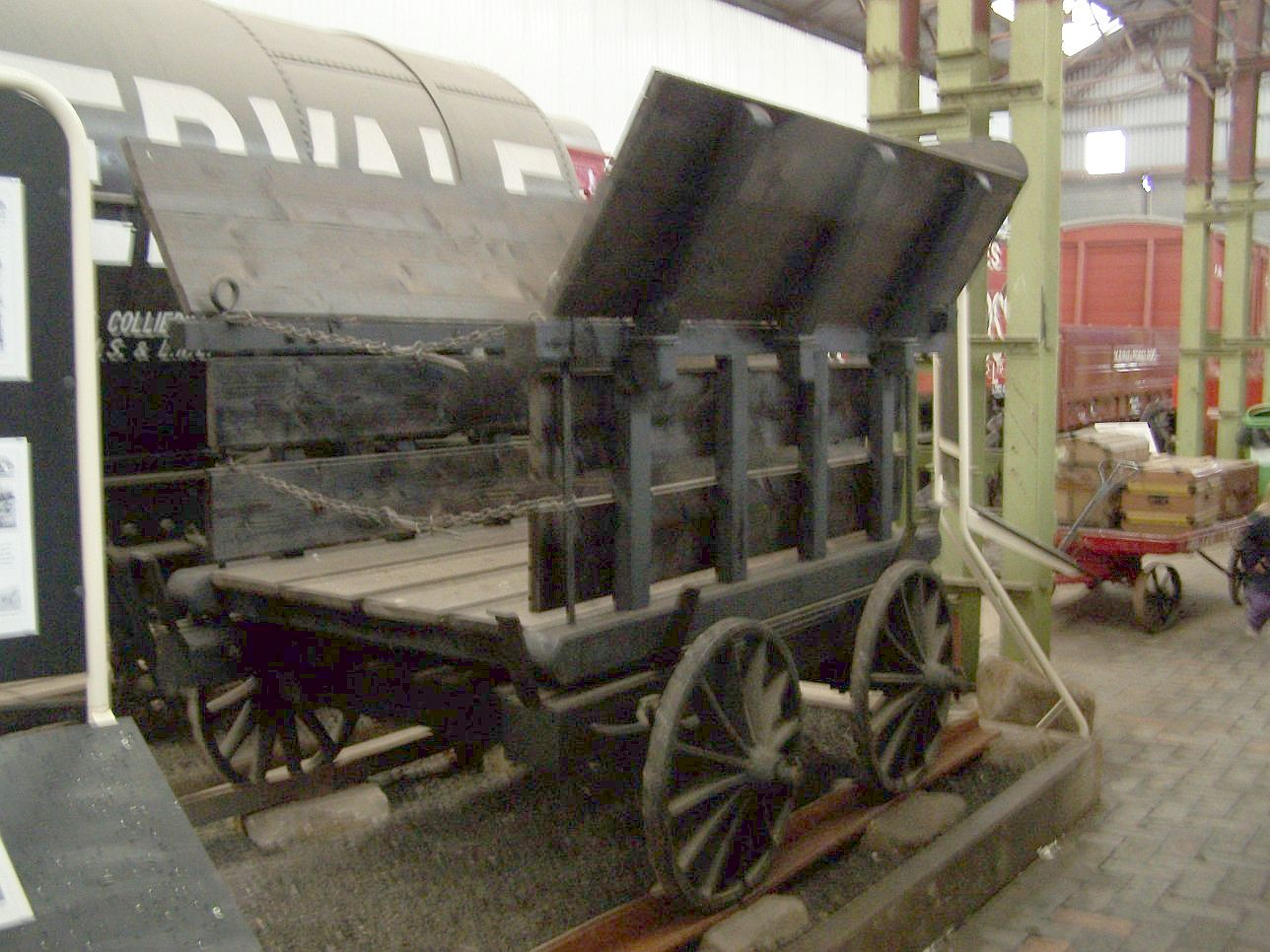
A replica of a "Little Eaton Tramway" wagon. The tracks are plateways.

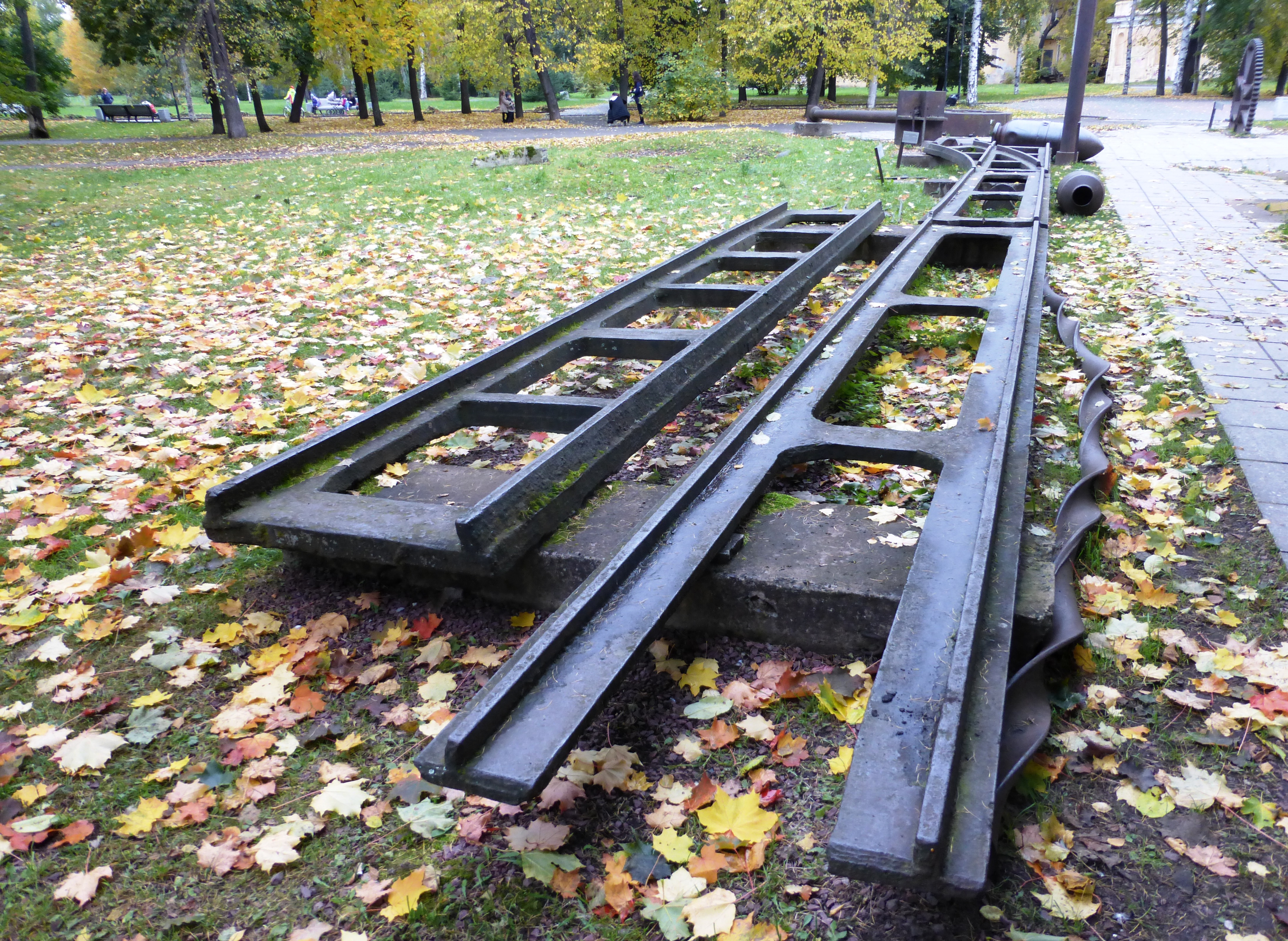
Cast-iron rails of the Alexandrovsky plant railway in Russia. 1788.

The introduction of steam engines to powering blast furnaces led to a large increase in British iron production after the mid-1750s.

In the late 1760s, the Coalbrookdale Company began to fix plates of cast iron to the upper surface of wooden rails, which increased their durability and load-bearing ability. At first, only balloon loops could be used for turning wagons, but later, movable points were introduced that allowed passing loops to be created.

A system was introduced in which unflanged wheels ran on L-shaped metal plates – these became known as plateways. John Curr, a Sheffield colliery manager, invented this flanged rail in 1787, though the exact date of this is disputed. The plate rail was taken up by Benjamin Outram for wagonways serving his canals, manufacturing them at his Butterley ironworks. In 1803, William Jessop opened the Surrey Iron Railway, a double track plateway in south London sometimes erroneously cited as world's first public railway.

In 1789, William Jessop had introduced a form of all-iron edge rail and flanged wheels for an extension to the Charnwood Forest Canal at Nanpantan, Loughborough, Leicestershire. In 1790, Jessop and his partner Outram began to manufacture edge-rails. Jessop became a partner in the Butterley Company in 1790. The first public edgeway (thus also first public railway) built was the Lake Lock Rail Road in 1796. Although the primary purpose of the line was to carry coal, it also carried passengers.

These two systems of constructing iron railways, the "L" plate-rail and the smooth edge-rail, continued to exist side by side into the early 19th century. The flanged wheel and edge-rail eventually proved its superiority and became the standard for railways.

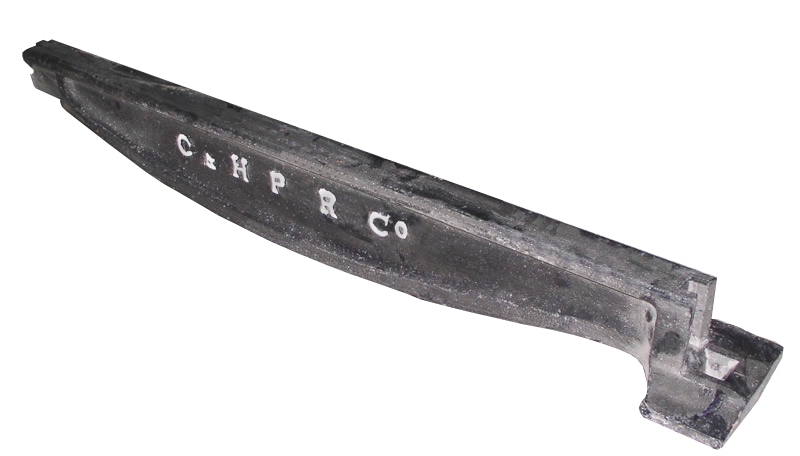
Cast-iron fishbelly edge rail manufactured by Outram at the Butterley Company ironworks for the Cromford and High Peak Railway (1831). These are smooth edgerails for wheels with flanges.

Cast iron was not a satisfactory material for rails because it was brittle and broke under heavy loads. The wrought iron rail invented by John Birkinshaw in 1820 solved this problem. Wrought iron (usually simply referred to as "iron") was a ductile material that could undergo considerable deformation before breaking, making it more suitable for iron rails, but wrought iron was expensive to produce until Henry Cort patented the puddling process in 1784. In 1783, Cort also patented the rolling process, which was 15 times faster at consolidating and shaping iron than hammering. These processes greatly lowered the cost of producing iron and iron rails. The next important development in iron production was hot blast patented by James Beaumont Neilson in 1828, which considerably reduced the amount of coke (fuel) or charcoal needed to produce pig iron. Wrought iron was a soft material that contained slag or dross. The softness and dross tended to make iron rails distort and delaminate, and they typically lasted less than 10 years in use and sometimes as little as one year under high traffic. All these developments in the production of iron eventually led to replacement of composite wood/iron rails with superior all-iron rails.

The introduction of the Bessemer process reduced the cost of steel production and led to a great expansion of railways that began in the late 1860s. Steel rails lasted several times longer than iron. Steel rails made heavier locomotives possible, allowing for longer trains and improving the productivity of railroads. However, the Bessemer process introduced nitrogen into the steel, which caused the steel to become brittle with age, and the open hearth furnace began to replace the Bessemer process near the end of the 19th century, improving the quality of steel and further reducing costs. Steel completely replaced the use of iron in rails, becoming standard for all railways. According to Ozyuksel, the rails were one of the major initiators of the expansion of the steel industry. 600,000 people across the globe worked in the rail industry in 1907.

== Steam power introduced ==
Scottish inventor and mechanical engineer James Watt greatly improved the steam engine of Thomas Newcomen, which was used to pump water out of mines. In 1769, Watt developed a reciprocating engine capable of powering a wheel. It was a large stationary engine: the state of boiler technology necessitated the use of low-pressure steam acting upon a vacuum in the cylinder, and this required a separate condenser and an air pump. As the construction of boilers improved, Watt investigated the use of high-pressure steam acting directly upon a piston. This raised the possibility of a smaller engine that could be used to power a vehicle, and he patented a design for a steam locomotive in 1784. His employee William Murdoch produced a working model of a self-propelled steam carriage in that year.

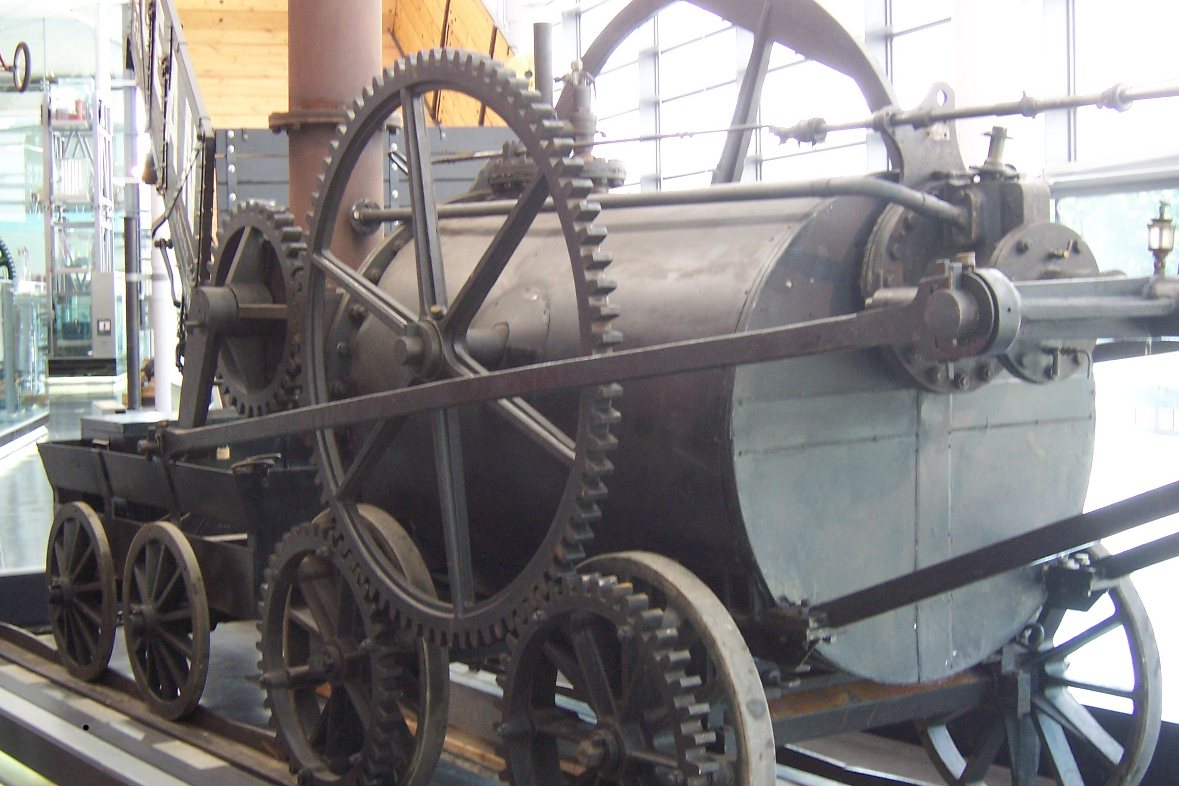
A replica of Trevithick's engine at the National Waterfront Museum, Swansea

In 1804, the first full-scale working railway steam locomotive was built in the United Kingdom by Richard Trevithick, a British engineer born in Cornwall. This used high-pressure steam to drive the engine by one power stroke. The transmission system employed a large flywheel to even out the action of the piston rod. On 21 February 1804, Trevithick's unnamed steam locomotive hauled a train along the tramway of the Penydarren ironworks near Merthyr Tydfil in South Wales, becoming the world's first steam-powered railway journey. Trevithick later demonstrated a locomotive operating upon a piece of circular rail track in Bloomsbury, London, the Catch Me Who Can, but he never got beyond the experimental stage with railway locomotives, not least because his engines were too heavy for the cast-iron plateway track in use at that time.

In 1812, the first commercially successful steam locomotive was Matthew Murray's rack locomotive Salamanca built for the Middleton Railway in Leeds. This twin-cylinder locomotive was not heavy enough to break the edge-rails track and solved the problem of adhesion by a cog-wheel using teeth cast on the side of one of the rails. Thus it was also the first rack railway.

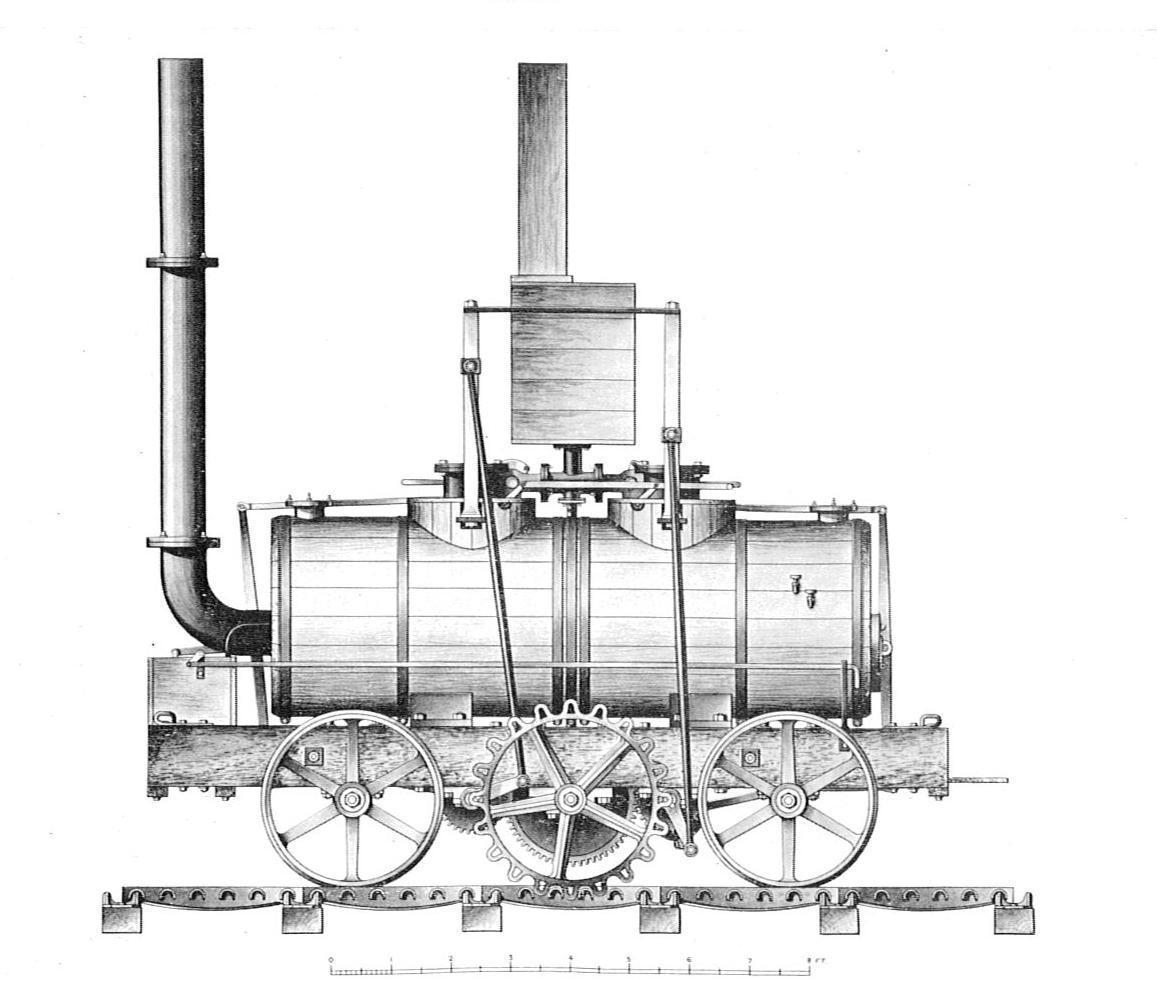
The British Salamanca locomotive, 1812

In 1813, this was followed by the locomotive Puffing Billy built by Christopher Blackett and William Hedley for the Wylam Colliery Railway, the first successful locomotive running by adhesion only. This was accomplished by the distribution of weight between a number of wheels. Puffing Billy is now on display in the Science Museum in London, making it the oldest locomotive in existence.

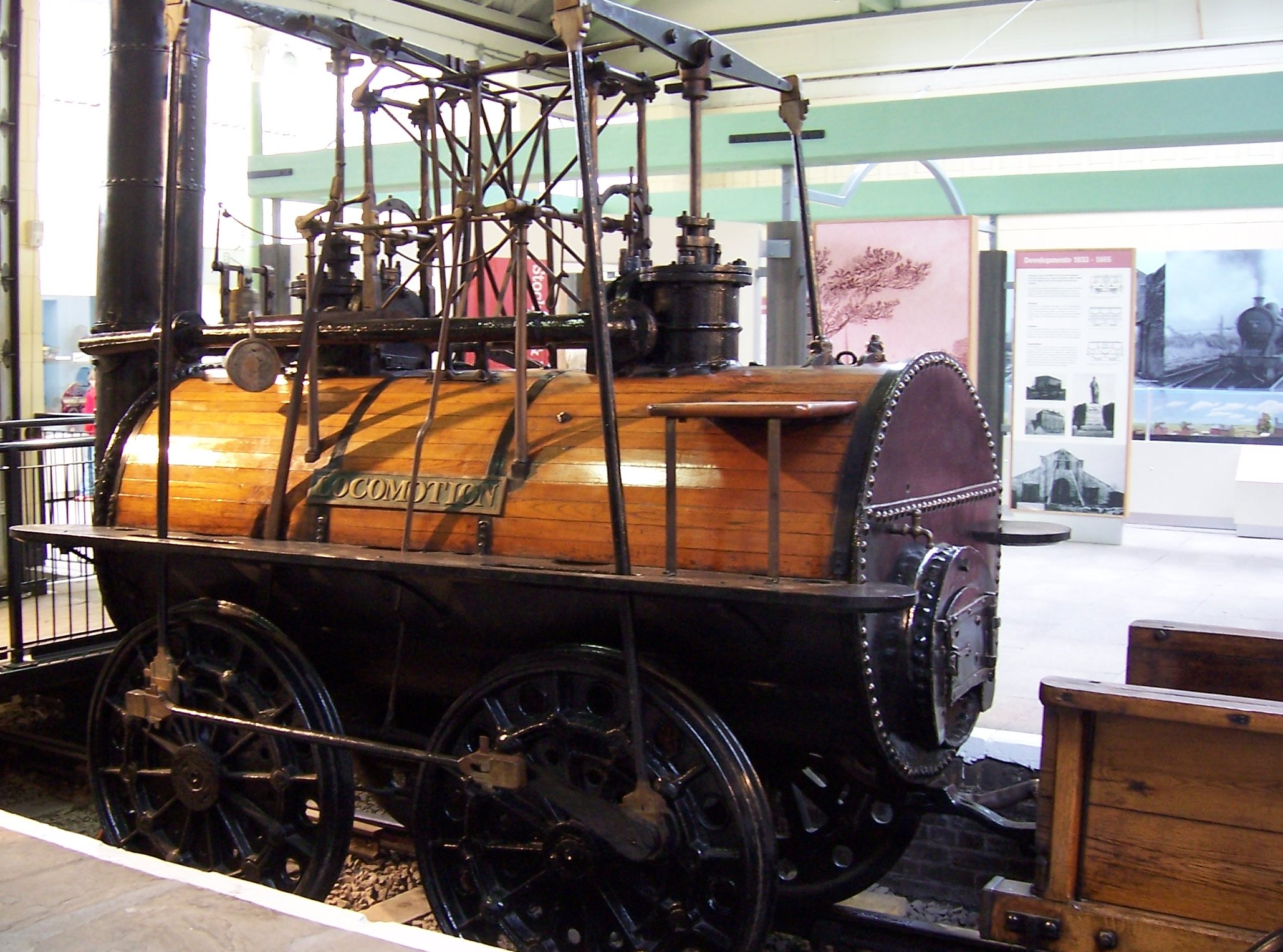
The original Locomotion at Darlington Railway Centre and Museum in northern England

In 1814, inspired by the early locomotives of Trevithick, Murray and Hedley, George Stephenson persuaded the manager of the Killingworth colliery where he worked to allow him to build a steam-powered machine. Stephenson played a pivotal role in the development and widespread adoption of the steam locomotive. His designs considerably improved on the work of the earlier pioneers. He built the locomotive Blücher, also a successful flanged-wheel adhesion locomotive. In 1825, he built the locomotive Locomotion for the Stockton and Darlington Railway in the North East of England, which became the first public steam railway in the world, although it used both horse power and steam power on different runs. In 1829, he built the locomotive Rocket, which entered in and won the Rainhill Trials. This success led to Stephenson establishing his company as the pre-eminent builder of steam locomotives for railways in Great Britain and Ireland, the United States, and much of Europe. In 1830, the first public railway which used only steam locomotives, all the time, the Liverpool and Manchester Railway, was built. On 15 September 1830, the world's first and historical train journey was between Liverpool and Manchester in England.

Steam power continued to be the dominant power system in railways around the world for more than a century.

== Electric power introduced ==
The first known electric locomotive was built in 1837 by chemist Robert Davidson of Aberdeen in Scotland, and it was powered by galvanic cells (batteries). Thus it was also the earliest battery electric locomotive. Davidson later built a larger locomotive named Galvani, exhibited at the Royal Scottish Society of Arts Exhibition in 1841. The seven-ton vehicle had two direct-drive reluctance motors, with fixed electromagnets acting on iron bars attached to a wooden cylinder on each axle, and simple commutators. It hauled a load of six tons at four miles per hour (6 kilometers per hour) for a distance of one and a half miles (2.4 kilometres). It was tested on the Edinburgh and Glasgow Railway in September of the following year, but the limited power from batteries prevented its general use. It was destroyed by railway workers, who saw it as a threat to their job security.

Early experimentation with railway electrification was undertaken by the Ukrainian engineer Fyodor Pirotsky. In 1875, he had electrically powered railway cars run on Miller's line, between Sestroretsk and Beloostrov. During September 1880, in St. Petersburg, Pirotsky put into operation an electric tram he had converted from a double-decker horse tramway. Although Pirotsky's own tram project was taken no further, his experiment and work in the field did stimulate interest in electric trams globally. Carl von Siemens met with Pirotsky and studied exhibits of his work carefully. The Siemens brothers (Carl and Werner) began commercial production of their own design of electric trams soon after, in 1881.

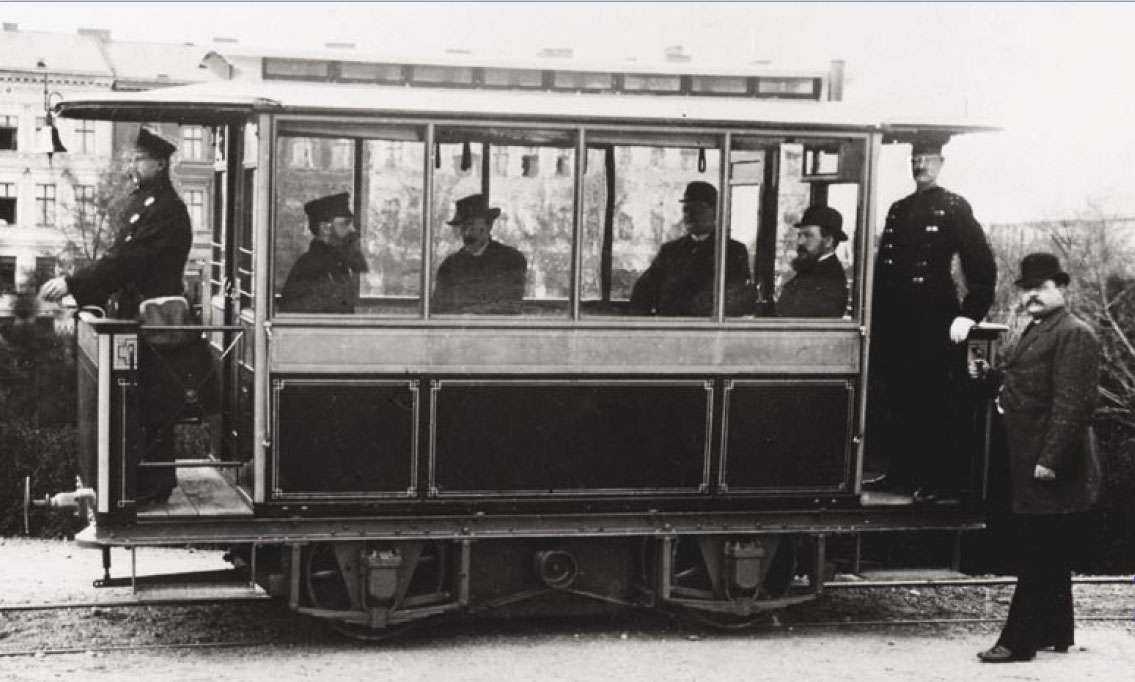
Lichterfelde tram, 1882

Werner von Siemens demonstrated an electric railway in 1879 in Berlin. One of the world's first electric tram lines, Gross-Lichterfelde Tramway, opened in Lichterfelde near Berlin, Germany, in 1881. It was built by Siemens. The tram ran on 180 Volt DC, which was supplied by running rails. In 1891 the track was equipped with an overhead wire and the line was extended to Berlin-Lichterfelde West station. The Volk's Electric Railway opened in 1883 in Brighton, England. The railway is still operational, thus making it the oldest operational electric railway in the world. Also in 1883, Mödling and Hinterbrühl Tram opened near Vienna in Austria. It was the first tram line in the world in regular service powered from an overhead line. Five years later, in the US electric trolleys were pioneered in 1888 on the Richmond Union Passenger Railway, using equipment designed by Frank J. Sprague.

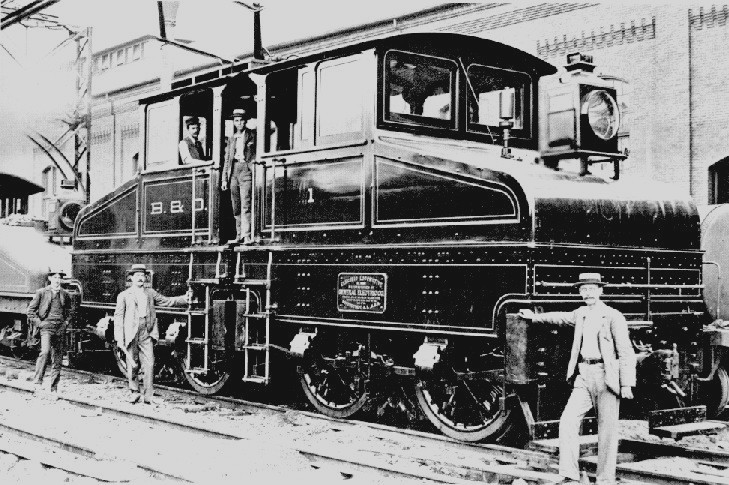
Baltimore & Ohio electric engine

The first use of electrification on a main line was on a four-mile stretch of the Baltimore Belt Line of the Baltimore and Ohio Railroad (B&O) in 1895 connecting the main portion of the B&O to the new line to New York through a series of tunnels around the edges of Baltimore's downtown.

Electricity quickly became the power supply of choice for subways, abetted by the Sprague's invention of multiple-unit train control in 1897. By the early 1900s, most street railways were electrified.

The first practical AC electric locomotive was designed by Charles Brown, then working for Oerlikon, Zürich. In 1891, Brown had demonstrated long-distance power transmission, using three-phase AC, between a hydro-electric plant at Lauffen am Neckar and Frankfurt am Main West, a distance of 280 km. Using experience he had gained while working for Jean Heilmann on steam-electric locomotive designs, Brown observed that three-phase motors had a higher power-to-weight ratio than DC motors and, because of the absence of a commutator, were simpler to manufacture and maintain. However, they were much larger than the DC motors of the time and could not be mounted in underfloor bogies: they could only be carried within locomotive bodies.

In 1894, Hungarian engineer Kálmán Kandó developed a new type 3-phase asynchronous electric drive motors and generators for electric locomotives. Kandó's early 1894 designs were first applied in a short three-phase AC tramway in Evian-les-Bains (France), which was constructed between 1896 and 1898.

In 1896, Oerlikon installed the first commercial example of the system on the Lugano Tramway. Each 30-tonne locomotive had two 110 kW (150 hp) motors run by three-phase 750 V 40 Hz fed from double overhead lines. Three-phase motors run at constant speed and provide regenerative braking, and are well suited to steeply graded routes, and the first main-line three-phase locomotives were supplied by Brown (by then in partnership with Walter Boveri) in 1899 on the 40 km Burgdorf–Thun line, Switzerland.

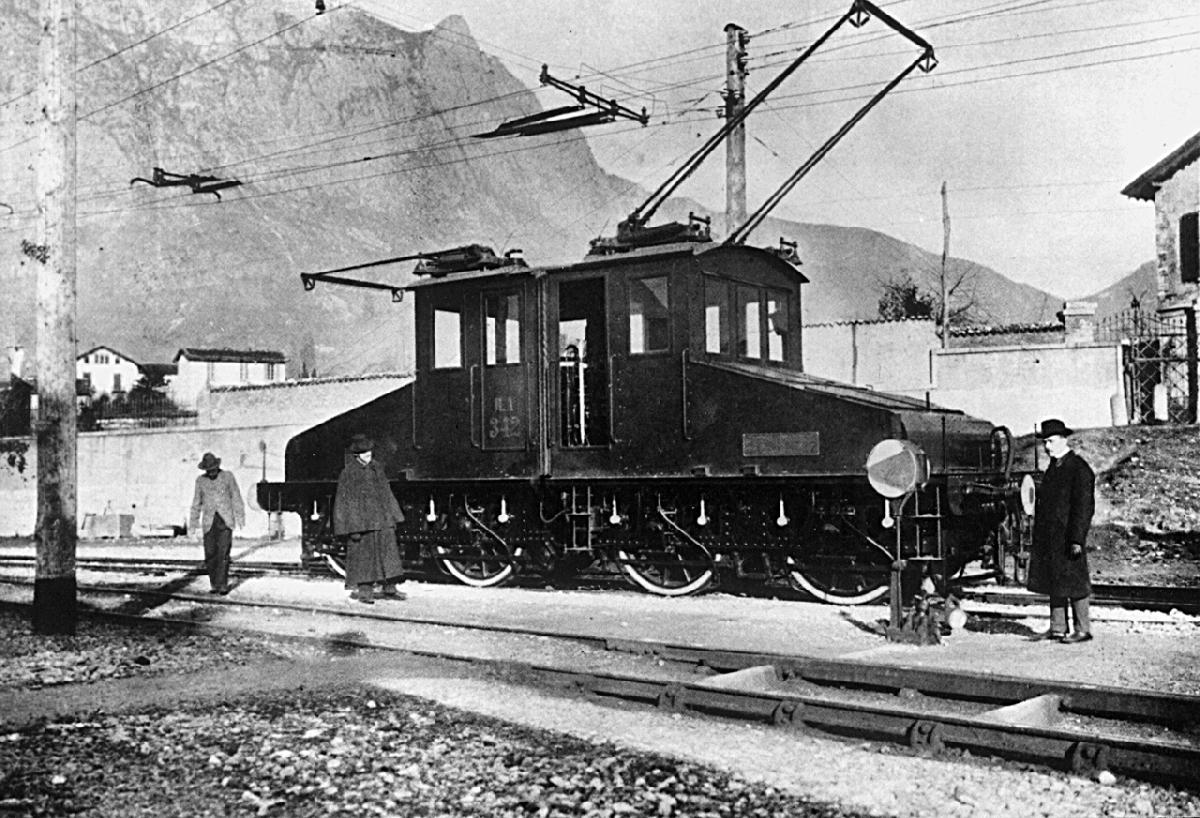
A prototype of a Ganz AC electric locomotive in Valtellina, Italy, 1901

Italian railways were the first in the world to introduce electric traction for the entire length of a main line rather than just a short stretch. The 106 km Ferrovia della Valtellina line was opened on 4 September 1902, designed by Kandó and a team from the Ganz works. The electrical system was three-phase at 3 kV 15 Hz. In 1918, Kandó invented and developed the rotary phase converter, enabling electric locomotives to use three-phase motors whilst supplied via a single overhead wire, carrying the simple industrial frequency (50 Hz) single phase AC of the high voltage national networks.

An important contribution to the wider adoption of AC traction came from SNCF of France after World War II. The company conducted trials at 50 Hz, and established it as a standard. Following SNCF's successful trials, 50 Hz (now also called industrial frequency) was adopted as standard for main lines across Europe and many other parts of the world.

== Diesel power introduced ==
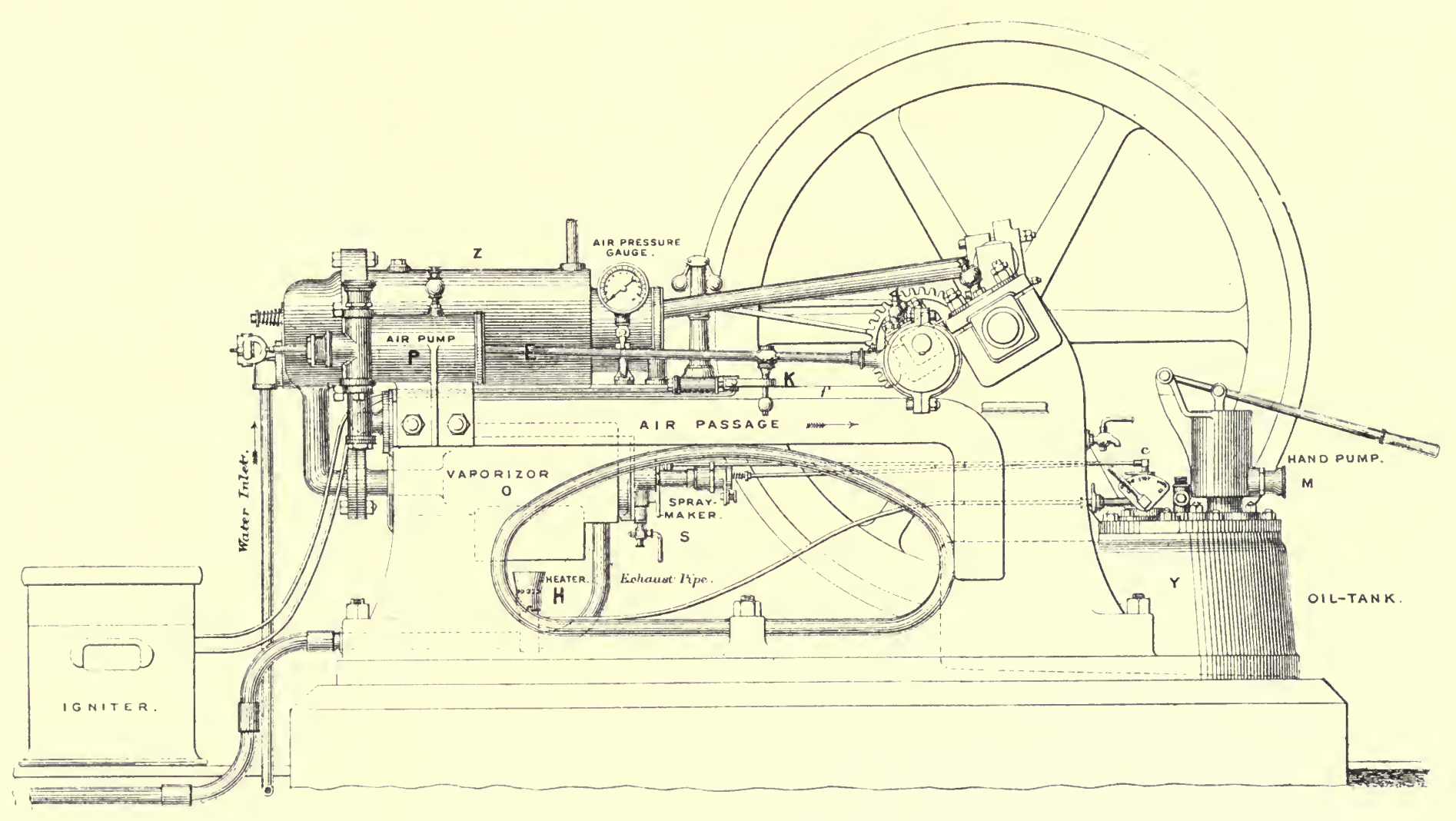
Diagram of Priestman Oil Engine from The Steam engine and gas and oil engines (1900) by John Perry

Earliest recorded examples of an internal combustion engine for railway use included a prototype designed by William Dent Priestman, which was examined by Sir William Thomson in 1888 who described it as a "Priestmans' petroleum engine" mounted upon a truck which is worked on a temporary line of rails to show the adaptation of a petroleum engine for locomotive purposes.". In 1894, a 20 hp (15 kW) two axle machine built by Priestman Brothers was used on the Hull Docks.

In 1906, Rudolf Diesel, Adolf Klose and the steam and diesel engine manufacturer Gebrüder Sulzer founded Diesel-Sulzer-Klose GmbH to manufacture diesel-powered locomotives. Sulzer had been manufacturing diesel engines since 1898. The Prussian State Railways ordered a diesel locomotive from the company in 1909. The world's first diesel-powered locomotive was operated in the summer of 1912 on the Winterthur–Romanshorn railway in Switzerland, but was not a commercial success. The locomotive weight was 95 tonnes and the power was 883 kW with a maximum speed of 100 km/h. Small numbers of prototype diesel locomotives were produced in a number of countries through the mid-1920s.

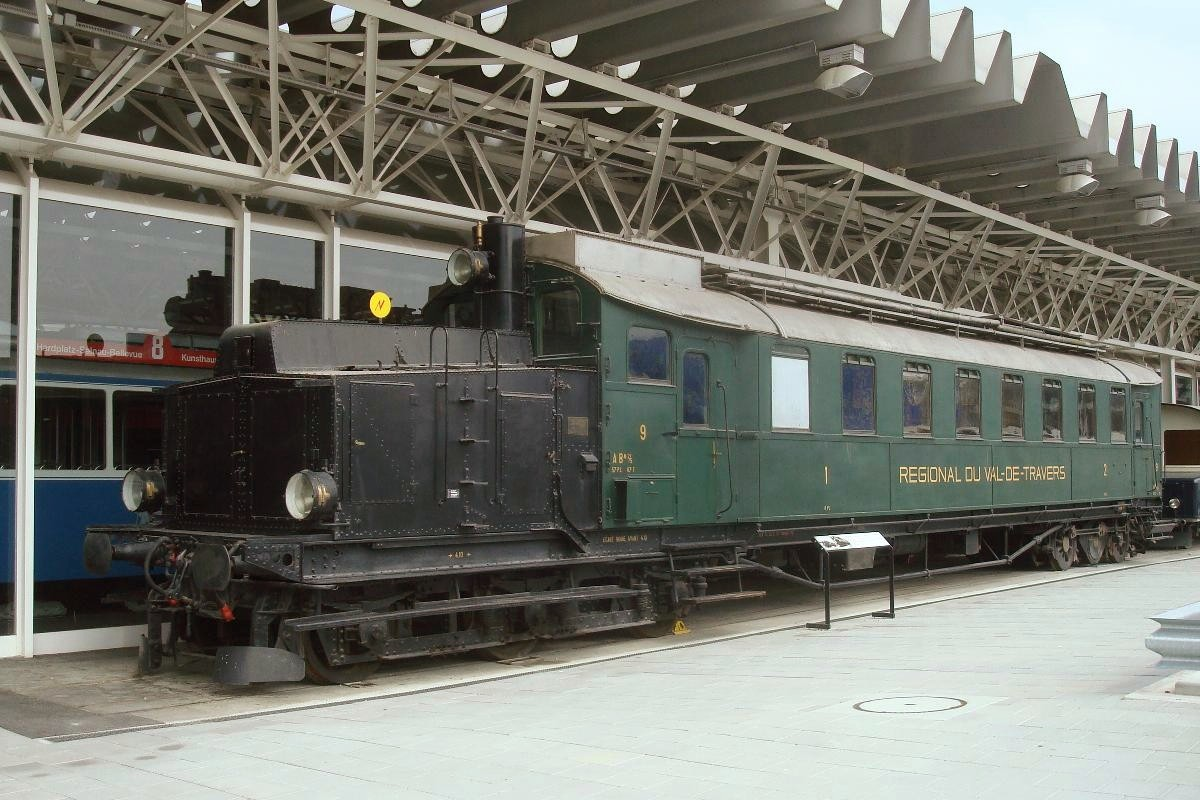
Swiss & German co-production: world's first functional diesel–electric railcar 1914

A significant breakthrough occurred in 1914, when Hermann Lemp, a General Electric electrical engineer, developed and patented a reliable direct current electrical control system (subsequent improvements were also patented by Lemp). Lemp's design used a single lever to control both engine and generator in a coordinated fashion, and was the prototype for all diesel–electric locomotive control systems. In 1914, world's first functional diesel–electric railcars were produced for the Königlich-Sächsische Staatseisenbahnen (Royal Saxon State Railways) by Waggonfabrik Rastatt with electric equipment from Brown, Boveri & Cie and diesel engines from Swiss Sulzer AG. They were classified as DET 1 and DET 2. The first regular use of diesel–electric locomotives was in switching (shunter) applications. General Electric produced several small switching locomotives in the 1930s (the famous "44-tonner" switcher was introduced in 1940) Westinghouse Electric and Baldwin collaborated to build switching locomotives starting in 1929.

In 1929, the Canadian National Railways became the first North American railway to use diesels in mainline service with two units, 9000 and 9001, from Westinghouse.

== High-speed rail ==
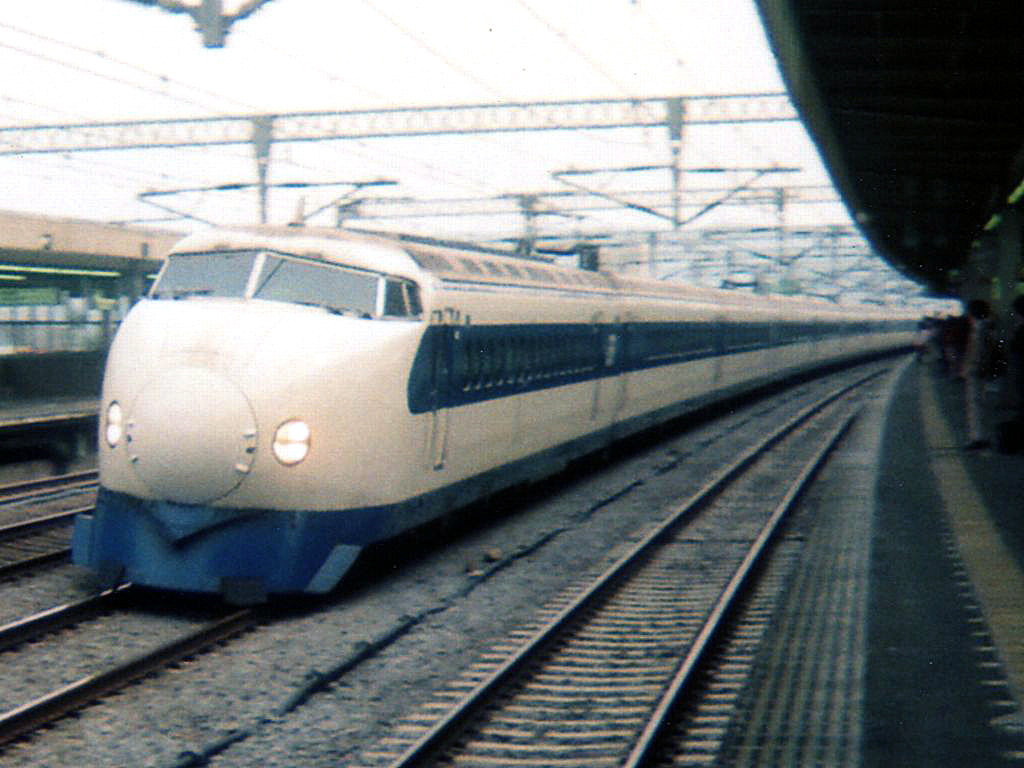
A Japanese 0-Series Shinkansen, introduced in 1964, triggered the intercity train travel boom.

The first electrified high-speed rail Tōkaidō Shinkansen (series 0) was introduced in 1964 between Tokyo and Osaka in Japan. Since then high-speed rail transport, functioning at speeds up and above 300 km/h (186.4 mph), has been built in Japan, Spain, France, Germany, Italy, Taiwan, the People's Republic of China, the United Kingdom, South Korea, Scandinavia, Belgium, the Netherlands, and Indonesia. The construction of many of these lines has resulted in the dramatic decline of short haul flights and automotive traffic between connected cities, such as the London–Paris–Brussels corridor, Madrid–Barcelona, Milan–Rome–Naples, as well as many other major lines.

High-speed trains normally operate on standard gauge tracks of continuously welded rail on grade-separated right-of-way that incorporates a large turning radius in its design. While high-speed rail is most often designed for passenger travel, some high-speed systems also offer freight service.

== Hydrogen power introduced ==
Alstom Coradia Lint hydrogen-powered train entered service in Lower Saxony, Germany in 2018.

== History by country ==
=== Europe ===
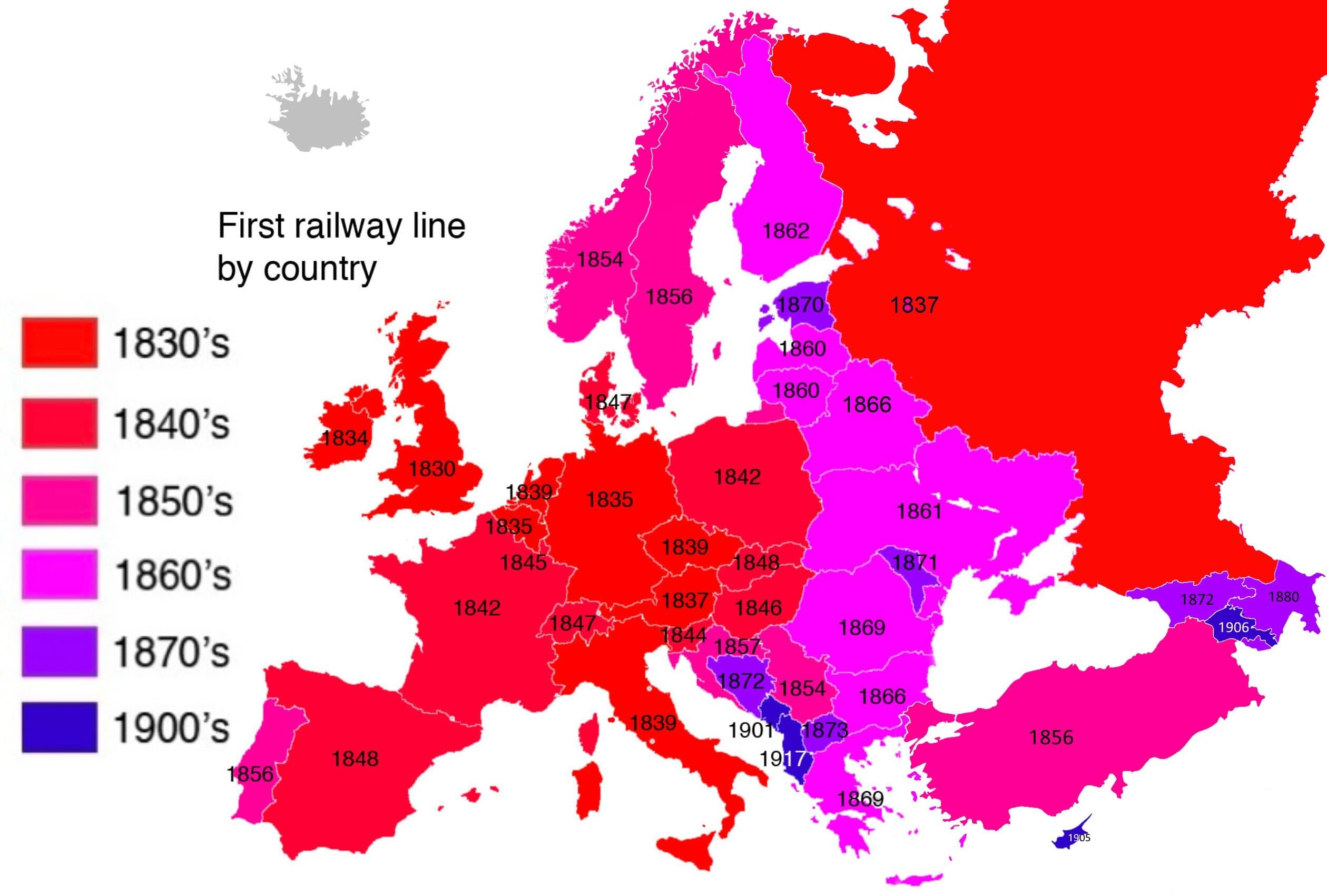
First railway line by country

In recent years deregulation has been a major topic across Europe.

==== Belgium ====
Belgium led the Industrial Revolution on the Continent starting in the 1820s. It showed the value of the railways for speeding the industrial revolution. After splitting from the Netherlands in 1830, the new country decided to stimulate industry. It planned and funded a simple cross-shaped system that connected the major cities, ports and mining areas and linked to neighboring countries. Unusually, the Belgian state became a major contributor to early rail development and championed the creation of a national network with no duplication of lines. Belgium thus became the railway center of the region.

The system was built along British lines, often with British engineers doing the planning. Profits were low but the infrastructure necessary for rapid industrial growth was put in place. In May 1835, the first railway in Belgium, running from northern Brussels to Mechelen, was completed.

==== Britain ====
Rail Passengers in Great Britain from 1829 to 2021, showing the rapid rise in passenger numbers in the 19th century

===== Early developments =====
The earliest railway in Britain was a wagonway system; a horse drawn wooden rail system, used by German miners at Caldbeck, Cumbria, England, perhaps from the 1560s. A wagonway was built at Prescot, near Liverpool, sometime around 1600, possibly as early as 1594. Owned by Philip Layton, the line carried coal from a pit near Prescot Hall to a terminus about half a mile away. On 26 July 1803, Jessop opened the Surrey Iron Railway, south of London erroneously considered first railway in Britain, also a horse-drawn one. It was not a railway in the modern sense of the word, as it functioned like a turnpike road. There were no official services, as anyone could bring a vehicle on the railway by paying a toll.

The oldest railway in continuous use is the Tanfield Railway in County Durham, England. This began life in 1725 as a wooden waggonway worked with horse power and developed by private coal owners and included the construction of the Causey Arch, the world's oldest purpose built railway bridge. By the mid 19th century it had converted to standard gauge track and steam locomotive power. It continues in operation as a heritage line. The Middleton Railway in Leeds, opened in 1758, is also still in use as a heritage line and began using steam locomotive power in 1812 before reverting to horsepower and then upgrading to standard gauge. In 1764, the first railway in the Americas was built in Lewiston, New York. The first passenger Horsecar or tram, Swansea and Mumbles Railway was opened between Swansea and Mumbles in Wales in 1807. Horse remained preferable mode for tram transport even after arrival of steam engines, well till the end of the 19th century. The major reason was that the horse-cars were clean as compared to steam driven trams which caused smoke in city streets.

In 1812, Oliver Evans, an American engineer and inventor, published his vision of what steam railways could become, with cities and towns linked by a network of long-distance railways plied by speedy locomotives, greatly speeding up personal travel and goods transport. Evans specified that there should be separate sets of parallel tracks for trains going in different directions. However, conditions in the infant United States did not enable his vision to take hold. This vision had its counterpart in Britain, where it proved to be far more influential. William James, a rich and influential surveyor and land agent, was inspired by the development of the steam locomotive to suggest a national network of railways. It seems likely that in 1808 James attended the demonstration running of Richard Trevithick's steam locomotive Catch me who can in London; certainly at this time he began to consider the long-term development of this means of transport. He proposed a number of projects that later came to fruition and is credited with carrying out a survey of the Liverpool and Manchester Railway. Unfortunately he became bankrupt and his schemes were taken over by George Stephenson and others. However, he is credited by many historians with the title of "Father of the Railway".

It was not until 1825, that the success of the Stockton and Darlington Railway in County Durham, England, the world's first public railway to combine locomotive power, malleable iron rails, twin tracks and other innovations such as early signalling, proto-Station buildings and rudimentary timetables in one place It proved to a national and international audience that the railways could be made profitable for passengers and general goods as well as a single commodity such as coal. This railway broke new ground by using rails made of rolled wrought iron, produced at Bedlington Ironworks in Northumberland. Such rails were stronger. This railway linked the coal field of Durham with the towns of Darlington and the port of Stockton-on-Tees and was intended to enable local collieries (which were connected to the line by short branches) to transport their coal to the docks. As this would constitute the bulk of the traffic, the company took the important step of offering to haul the colliery wagons or chaldrons by locomotive power, something that required a scheduled or timetabled service of trains. However, the line also functioned as a toll railway, on which private horse-drawn wagons could be carried. This hybrid of a system (which also included, at one stage, a horse-drawn passenger traffic when sufficient locomotives weren't available) could not last and within a few years, traffic was restricted to timetabled trains. (However, the tradition of private owned wagons continued on railways in Britain until the 1960s.). The S&DRs chief engineer Timothy Hackworth under the guidance of its principal funder Edward Pease, hosted visiting engineers from the US, Prussia and France and shared experience and learning on how to build and run a railway so that by 1830 railways were being built in several locations across the UK, USA and Europe. Trained engineers and workers from the S&DR went on to help develop several other lines elsewhere including the Liverpool and Manchester of 1830, the next step forward in railway development.

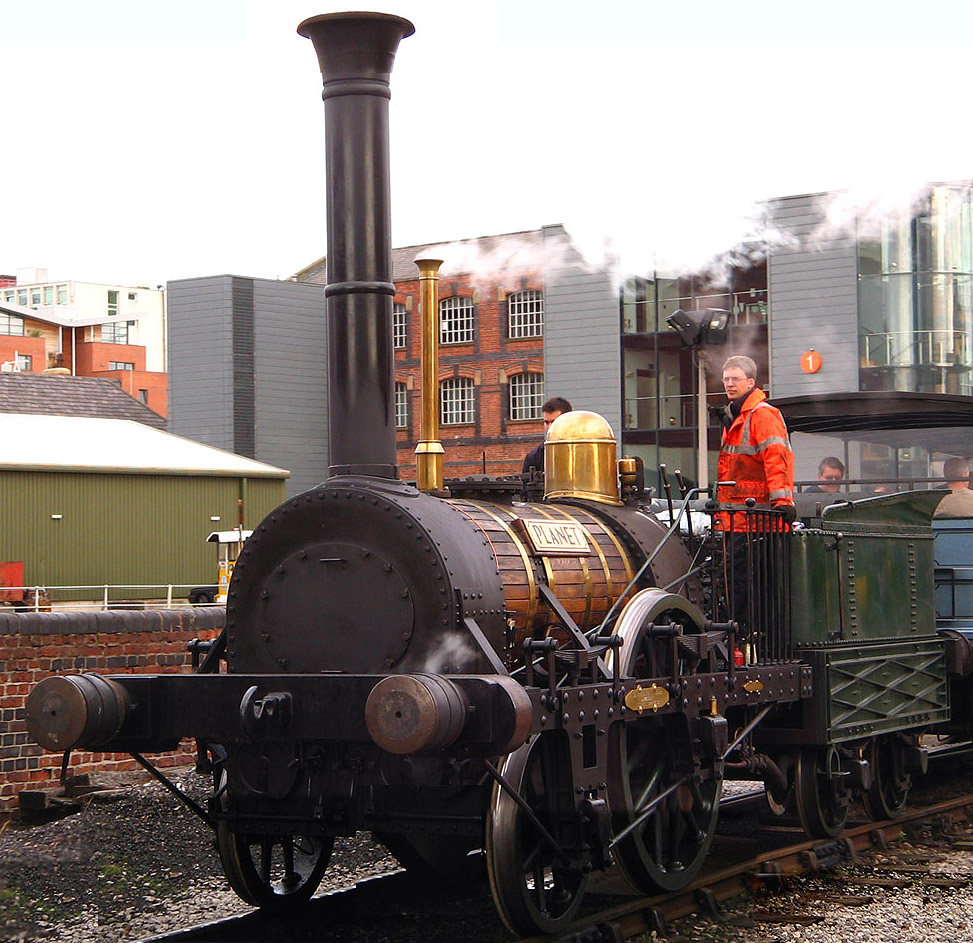
A replica of the Planet, which ran on the Liverpool and Manchester Railway from 1830

The success of the Stockton and Darlington encouraged the rich investors in the rapidly industrialising North West of England to embark upon a project to link the rich cotton manufacturing town of Manchester with the thriving port of Liverpool. The Liverpool and Manchester Railway was the first modern railway, in that both the goods and passenger traffic were operated by scheduled or timetabled locomotive hauled trains. When it was built, there was serious doubt that locomotives could maintain a regular service over the distance involved. A widely reported competition was held in 1829 called the Rainhill Trials, to find the most suitable steam engine to haul the trains. A number of locomotives were entered, including Novelty, Perseverance and Sans Pareil. The winner was Stephenson's Rocket, which steamed better because of its multi-tubular boiler (suggested by Henry Booth, a director of the railway company).

The promoters were mainly interested in goods traffic, but after the line opened on 15 September 1830, they were surprised to find that passenger traffic was just as remunerative. The success of the Liverpool and Manchester railway added to the influence of the S&DR in the development of railways elsewhere in Britain and abroad. The company hosted many visiting deputations from other railway projects and many railwaymen received their early training and experience upon this line. The Liverpool and Manchester line was, however, only 35 miles (56 km) long. The world's first trunk line can be said to be the Grand Junction Railway, opening in 1837 and linking a midpoint on the Liverpool and Manchester Railway with Birmingham, via Crewe, Stafford and Wolverhampton.

===== Further development =====
The earliest locomotives in revenue service were small four-wheeled ones similar to the Rocket. However, the inclined cylinders caused the engine to rock, so they first became horizontal and then, in his "Planet" design, were mounted inside the frames. While this improved stability, the "crank axles" were extremely prone to breakage. Greater speed was achieved by larger driving wheels at expense of a tendency for wheel slip when starting. Greater tractive effort was obtained by smaller wheels coupled together, but speed was limited by the fragility of the cast-iron connecting rods. Hence, from the beginning, there was a distinction between the light fast passenger locomotive and the slower more powerful goods engine. Edward Bury, in particular, refined this design and the so-called "Bury Pattern" was popular for a number of years, particularly on the London and Birmingham.

Meanwhile, by 1840, Stephenson had produced larger, more stable, engines in the form of the 2-2-2 "Patentee" and six-coupled goods engines. Locomotives were travelling longer distances and being worked more extensively. The North Midland Railway expressed their concern to Robert Stephenson who was, at that time, their general manager, about the effect of heat on their fireboxes. After some experiments, he patented his so-called Long Boiler design. These became a new standard and similar designs were produced by other manufacturers, particularly Sharp Brothers whose engines became known affectionately as "Sharpies".

The longer wheelbase for the longer boiler produced problems in cornering. For his six-coupled engines, Stephenson removed the flanges from the centre pair of wheels. For his express engines, he shifted the trailing wheel to the front in the 4-2-0 formation, as in his "Great A". There were other problems: the firebox was restricted in size or had to be mounted behind the wheels; and for improved stability most engineers believed that the centre of gravity should be kept low.

The most extreme outcome of this was the Crampton locomotive which mounted the driving wheels behind the firebox and could be made very large in diameter. These achieved the hitherto unheard of speed of 70 mph (110 km/h) but were very prone to wheelslip. With their long wheelbase, they were unsuccessful on Britain's winding tracks, but became popular in the US and France, where the popular expression became prendre le Crampton.

John Gray of the London and Brighton Railway disbelieved the necessity for a low centre of gravity and produced a series of locomotives that were much admired by David Joy who developed the design at the firm of E. B. Wilson and Company to produce the 2-2-2 Jenny Lind locomotive, one of the most successful passenger locomotives of its day. Meanwhile, the Stephenson 0-6-0 Long Boiler locomotive with inside cylinders became the archetypal goods engine.

Growth of British railways
Year	Total miles
1830	98
1835	338
1840	1,498
1845	2,441
1850	6,621
1855	8,280
1860	10,433

===== Expanding network =====
Railways quickly became essential to the swift movement of goods and labour that was needed for industrialization. In the beginning, canals were in competition with the railways, but the railways quickly gained ground as steam and rail technology improved and railways were built in places where canals were not practical.

By the 1850s, many steam-powered railways had reached the fringes of built-up London. But the new companies were not permitted to demolish enough property to penetrate the city or the West End, so passengers had to disembark at Paddington, Euston, King's Cross, Fenchurch Street, Charing Cross, Waterloo or Victoria and then make their own way by hackney carriage or on foot into the centre, thereby massively increasing congestion in the city. A Metropolitan Railway was built underground to connect several of these separate railway terminals and was the world's first "Metro".

===== Social and economic consequences =====
The railways changed British society in numerous and complex ways. Although recent attempts to measure the economic significance of the railways have suggested that their overall contribution to the growth of GDP was more modest than an earlier generation of historians sometimes assumed, it is nonetheless clear that the railways had a sizeable impact in many spheres of economic activity. The building of railways and locomotives, for example, called for large quantities of heavy materials and thus provided a significant stimulus or 'backward linkage', to the coal-mining, iron-production, engineering and construction industries.

They also helped to reduce transaction costs, which in turn lowered the costs of goods: the distribution and sale of perishable goods such as meat, milk, fish and vegetables were transformed by the emergence of the railways, giving rise not only to cheaper produce in the shops but also to far greater variety in people's diets.

Finally, by improving personal mobility the railways were a significant force for social change. Rail transport had originally been conceived as a way of moving coal and industrial goods but the railway operators quickly realised the potential market for railway travel, leading to an extremely rapid expansion in passenger services. The number of railway passengers trebled in just eight years between 1842 and 1850: traffic volumes roughly doubled in the 1850s and then doubled again in the 1860s.

As the historian Derek Aldcroft has noted, "in terms of mobility and choice they added a new dimension to everyday life".

==== Bulgaria ====
The Ruse – Varna railway was the first line in the Ottoman Empire and in modern Bulgaria. In 1864, the Ottoman government commissioning an English company managed by William Gladstone, a politician, and the Barkley brothers, civil engineers, to build it. The line was opened in 1866 and was 223 km long.

==== France ====
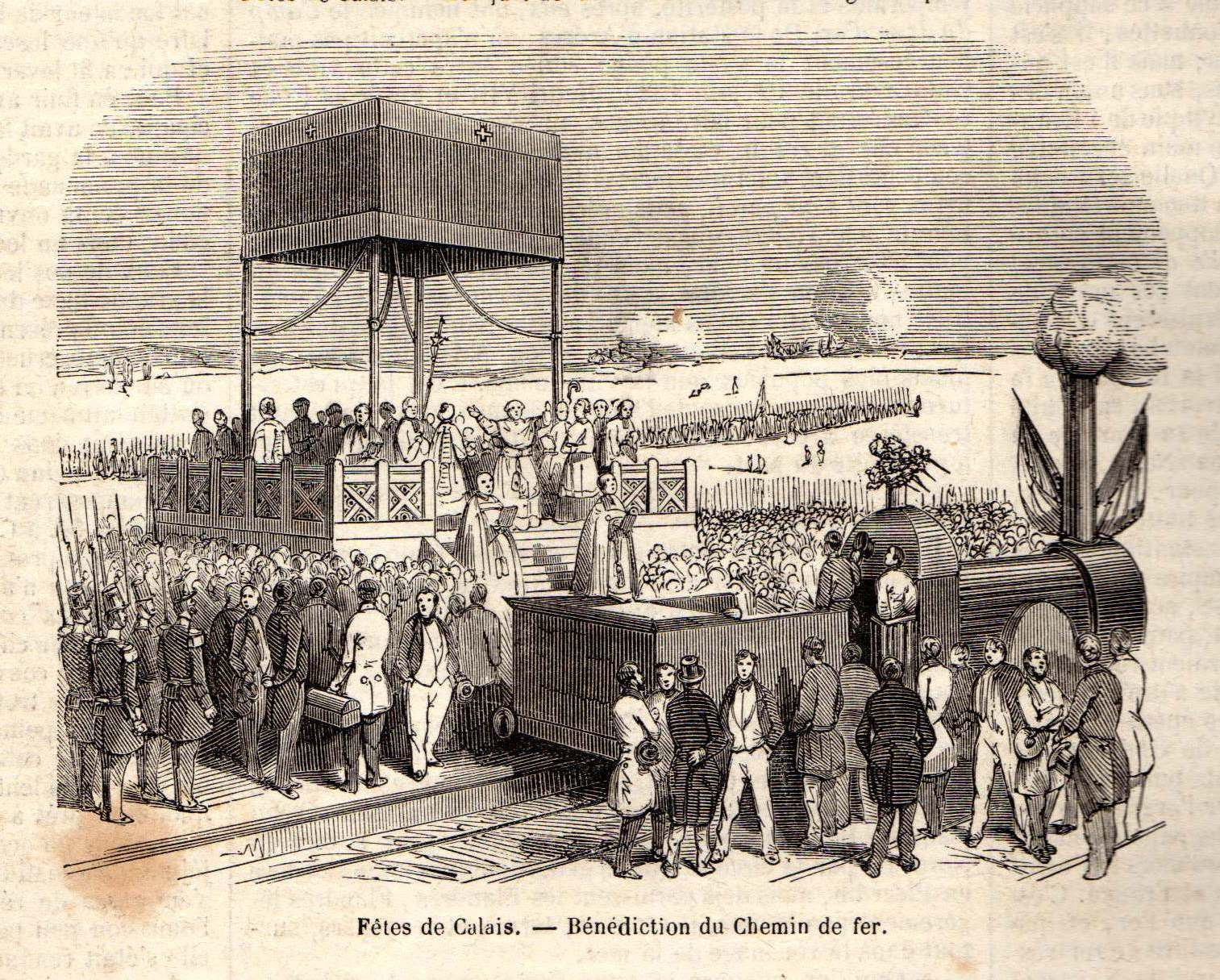
Catholic priests bless a railway engine in Calais, 1848

In France, the first railways were operated by private coal companies. The first legal agreement to build a railway was signed in 1823, and the line (Saint-Étienne to Andrézieux) started operation in 1827. Much of the equipment was imported from Britain, but demand soon spurred a national heavy industry. Trains became a national medium for the modernization of backward regions. A leading advocate of this approach was the poet-politician Alphonse de Lamartine. One writer hoped that railways might improve the lot of "populations two or three centuries behind their fellows" and eliminate "the savage instincts born of isolation and misery." France built a centralized system that radiated out from Paris, which also included lines that cut east to west in the south. This design was intended to achieve political and cultural goals rather than maximize efficiency.

After some time, six companies consolidated monopolies over their regions, subject to close government control of fares, finances, and even minute technical details. The central government department of Ponts et Chaussées (bridges and roads) brought in British engineers and workers, handled much of the construction work, provided engineering expertise and planning, acquired land, and built permanent infrastructure such as the track bed, bridges and tunnels. It also subsidized military lines along the German border, which was considered necessary for national defense. Private operating companies provided management, hired labor, laid the tracks, and built and operated stations. They purchased and maintained the rolling stock—6,000 locomotives were in operation in 1880, which averaged 51,600 passengers a year or 21,200 tons of freight.

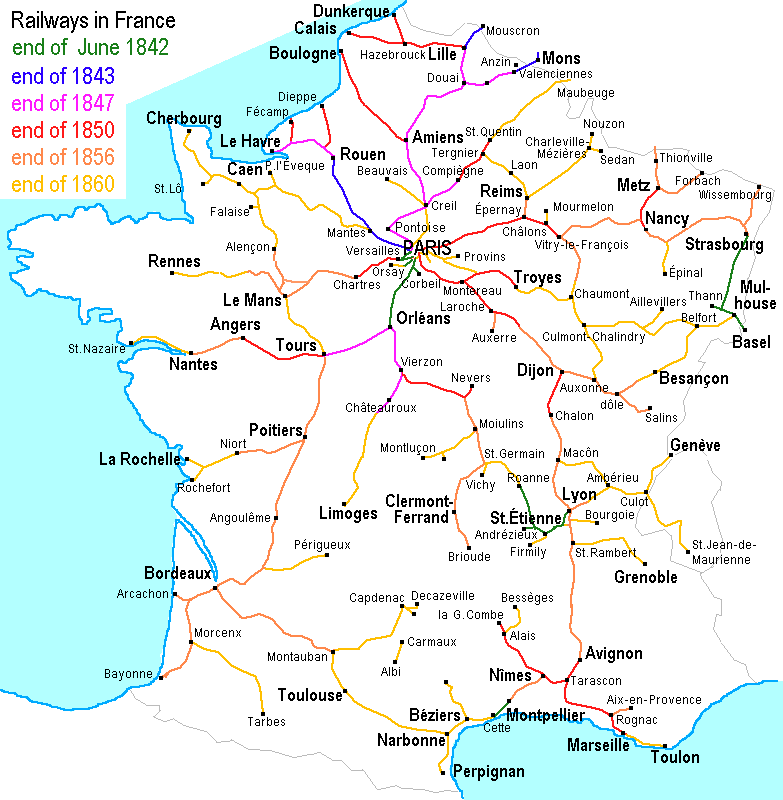
Development of the network up to 1860

Although starting the whole system at once was politically expedient, it delayed completion and forced even more reliance on temporary experts brought in from Britain. Financing was also a problem. The solution was a narrow base of funding through the Rothschilds and the closed circles of the Bourse in Paris, so France did not develop the same kind of national stock exchange that flourished in London and New York. The system did help modernize the parts of rural France it reached and help to develop many local industrial centers, mostly in the North (coal and iron mines) and in the East (textiles and heavy industry). Critics such as Émile Zola complained that it never overcame the corruption of the political system, but rather contributed to it.

The railways probably helped the industrial revolution in France by facilitating a national market for raw materials, wines, cheeses and imported and exported manufactured products. In The Rise of Rail-Power in War and Conquest, 1833–1914, published in 1915, Edwin A. Pratt wrote, "the French railways … attained a remarkable degree of success. … It was estimated that the 75,966 men and 4,469 horses transported by rail from Paris to the Mediterranean or to the frontiers of the Kingdom of Sardinia between 20 and 30 April April [during the 1859 Second Italian War of Independence] would have taken sixty days to make the journey by road. … This… was about twice as fast as the best achievement recorded up to that time on the German railways. " Yet the goals set by the French for their railway system were moralistic, political and military rather than economic. As a result, the freight trains were shorter and less heavily loaded than those in such rapidly industrializing nations such as Britain, Belgium or Germany. Other infrastructure needs in rural France, such as better roads and canals, were neglected because of the expense of the railways, so it seems likely that there were net negative effects in areas not served by the trains.

==== Germany ====
An operation was illustrated in Germany in 1556 by Georgius Agricola in his work De re metallica. This line used "Hund" carts with unflanged wheels running on wooden planks and a vertical pin on the truck fitting into the gap between the planks to keep it going the right way. The miners called the wagons Hunde ("dogs") from the noise they made on the tracks. This system became very popular across Europe.

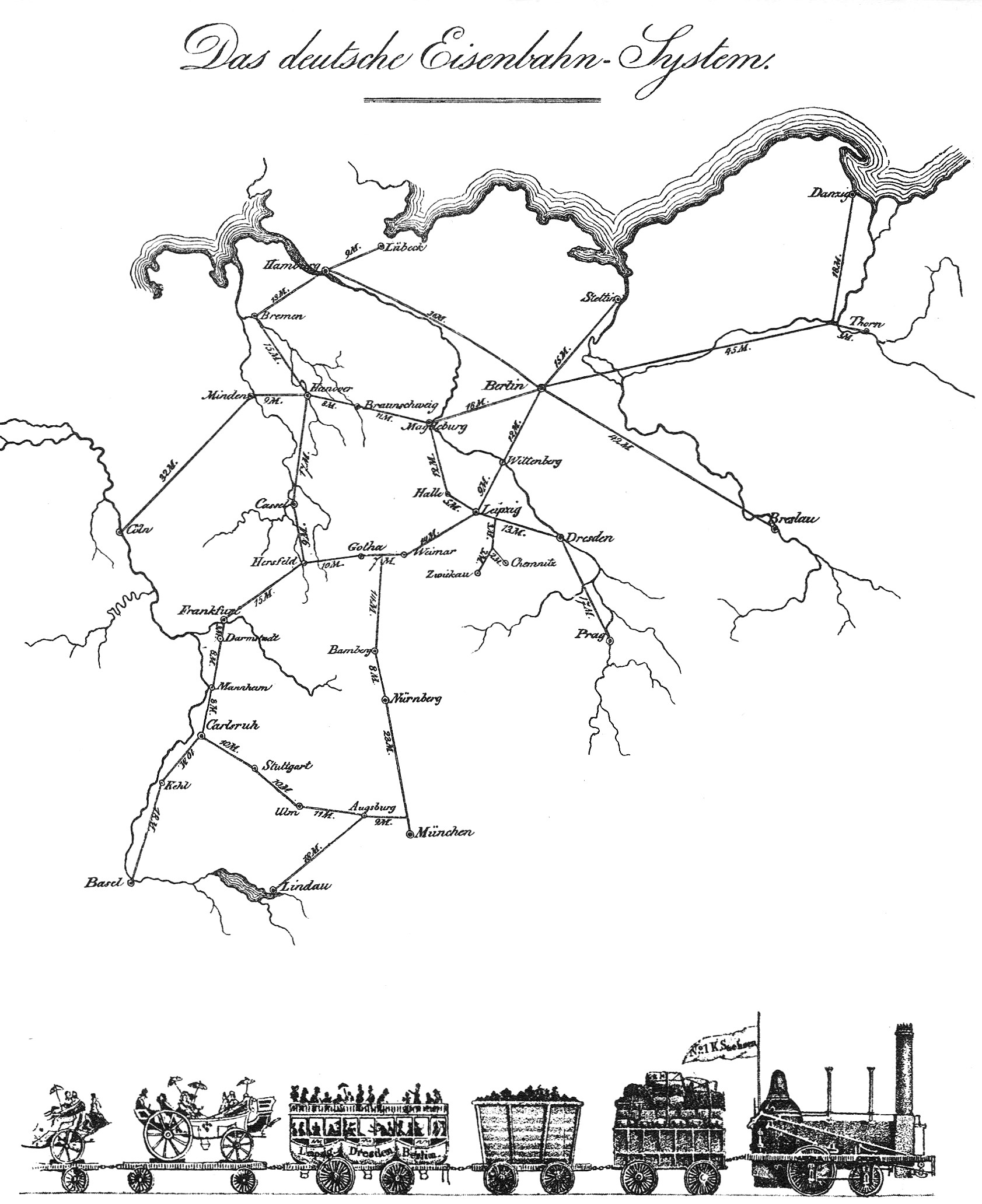
Friedrich List's concept for a German railway net from 1833

Economic development came with the railroad revolution in the 1840s, which opened up new markets for local products, created a pool of middle managers, increased the demand for engineers, architects and skilled machinists, and stimulated investments in coal and iron. Political disunity of three dozen states and pervasive conservatism had made it difficult to build railways in the 1830s. However, by the 1840s, trunk lines linked major cities. Each German state was responsible for the lines within its own borders. Economist Friedrich List summed up the advantages of the railway system in 1841:

1. As a means of national defence, it facilitates the concentration, distribution and direction of the army.
2. It is a means to the improvement of the culture of the nation. It brings talent, knowledge and skill of every kind readily to market.
3. It secures the community against dearth and famine and against excessive fluctuation in the prices of the necessaries of life.
4. It promotes the spirit of the nation, as it has a tendency to destroy the Philistine spirit arising from isolation and provincial prejudice and vanity. It binds nations by ligaments and promotes an interchange of food and of commodities, thus making it feel to be a unit. The iron rails become a nerve system, which, on the one hand, strengthens public opinion, and, on the other hand, strengthens the power of the state for police and governmental purposes.

Lacking a technological base at first, the Germans imported their engineering and hardware from Britain, but quickly learned the skills needed to operate and expand the railways. In many cities, the new railway shops were the centres of technological awareness and training, so that by 1850, Germany was self-sufficient in meeting the demands of railroad construction and the railways were a major impetus for the growth of the new steel industry. Observers found that even as late as 1890, their engineering was inferior to Britain's. However, German unification in 1870 stimulated consolidation, nationalisation into state-owned companies and further rapid growth. Unlike the situation in France, the goal was support of industrialisation and so heavy lines crisscrossed the Ruhr and other industrial districts and provided good connections to the major ports of Hamburg and Bremen. By 1880, Germany had 9,400 locomotives pulling 43,000 passengers and 30,000 tons of freight a day and forged ahead of France.

==== Italy ====
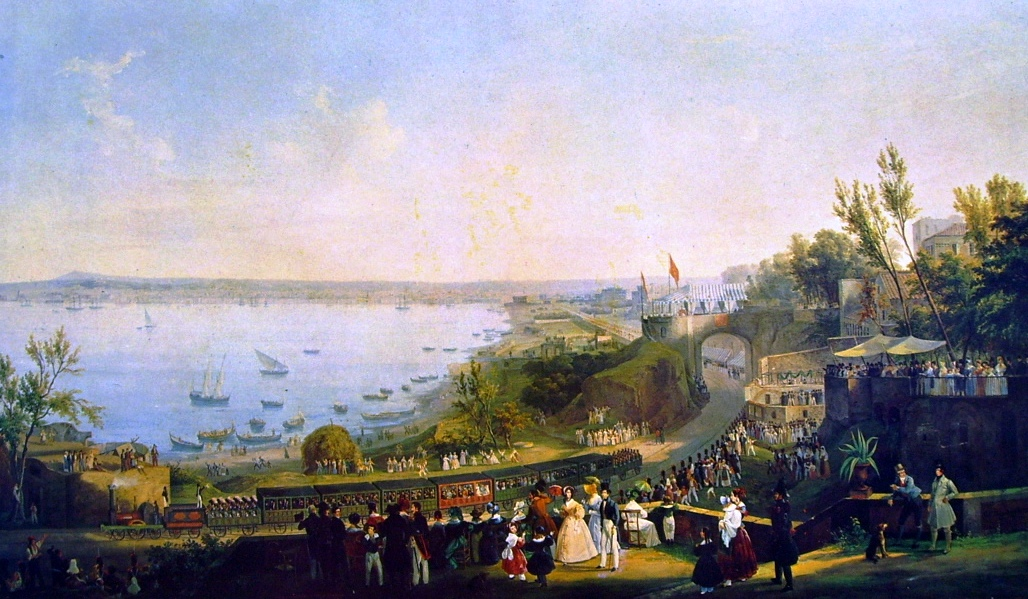
The inauguration of the Naples–Portici railway on 3 October 1839, the first Italian railway line

Railways were introduced to Italy when it was still a divided country. The first line to be built on the peninsula was the Naples–Portici line in the Kingdom of the Two Sicilies, which was 7.640 km (4.747 mi) long and inaugurated on 3 October 1839. This was nine years after the world's first "modern" inter-city railway, the Liverpool and Manchester Railway. During the first phase of development, it was operated by a locomotive derived from the British Planet, which served the Royal convoy that traveled between the capital city of Naples and the summer residence at Royal Palace of Portici. Soon after, the line lost its exclusive nature and was rapidly expanded toward Salerno and Nola, serving both public transportation and freight needs.

The following year the firm Holzhammer of Bolzano was granted the "Imperial-Royal privilege" to build the Milano–Monza line (12 km (7.5 mi)), the second railway built in Italy, in the then Kingdom of Lombardy–Venetia, a part of the Austrian Empire. On request of the Milanese and Venetian industries, but also for the already clear military importance, construction of the Milan–Venice line was begun. In 1842 the Padua-Mestre stretch of 32 km (20 mi) was inaugurated, followed in 1846 by the Milan-Treviglio (32 km (20 mi)) and Padua-Vicenza (30 km (19 mi)), as well as the bridge spanning the lagoon of Venice.

Rail network in Italy 1861-1870

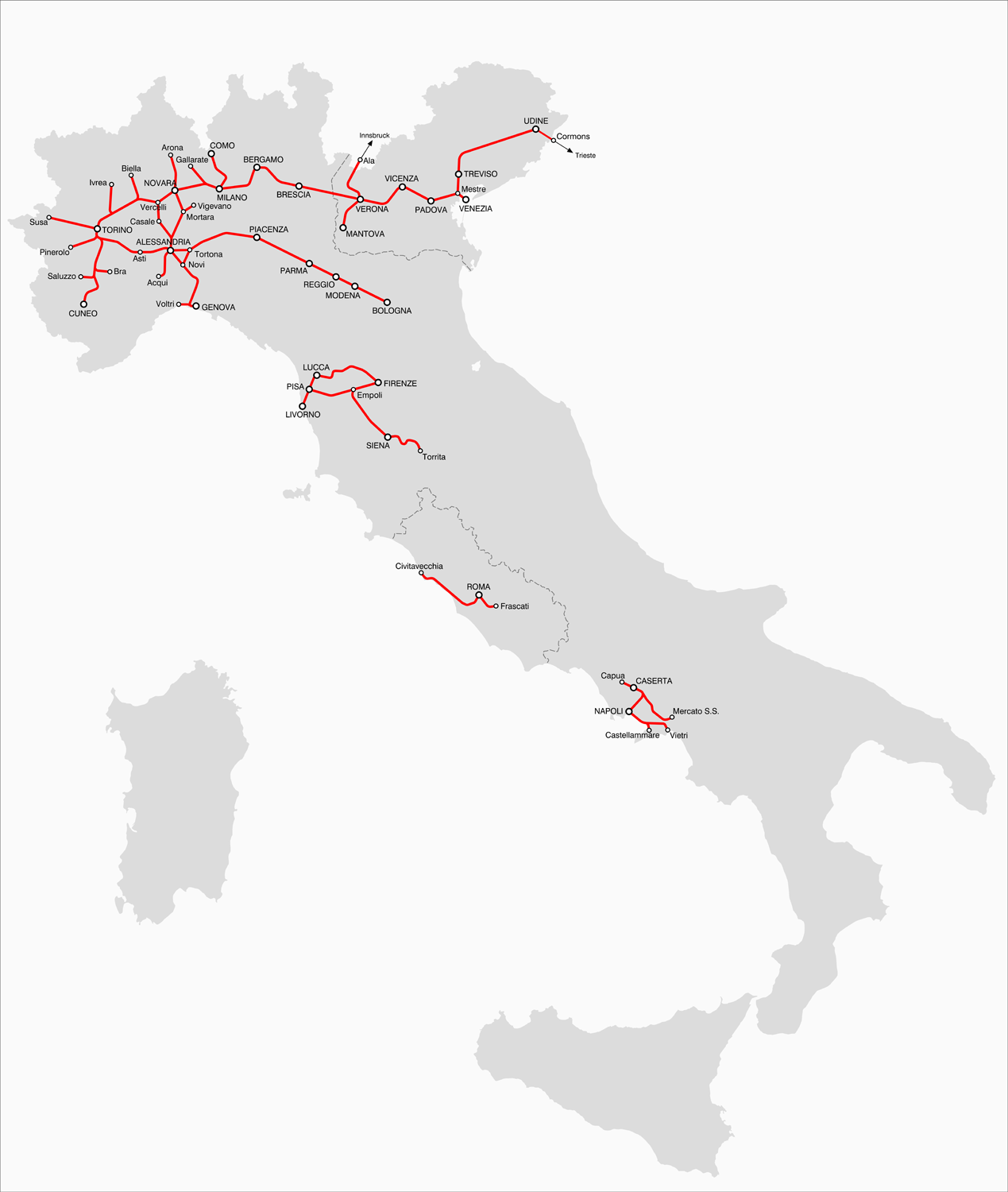
Network as of 17 March 1861, at the creation of the unified Kingdom of Italy

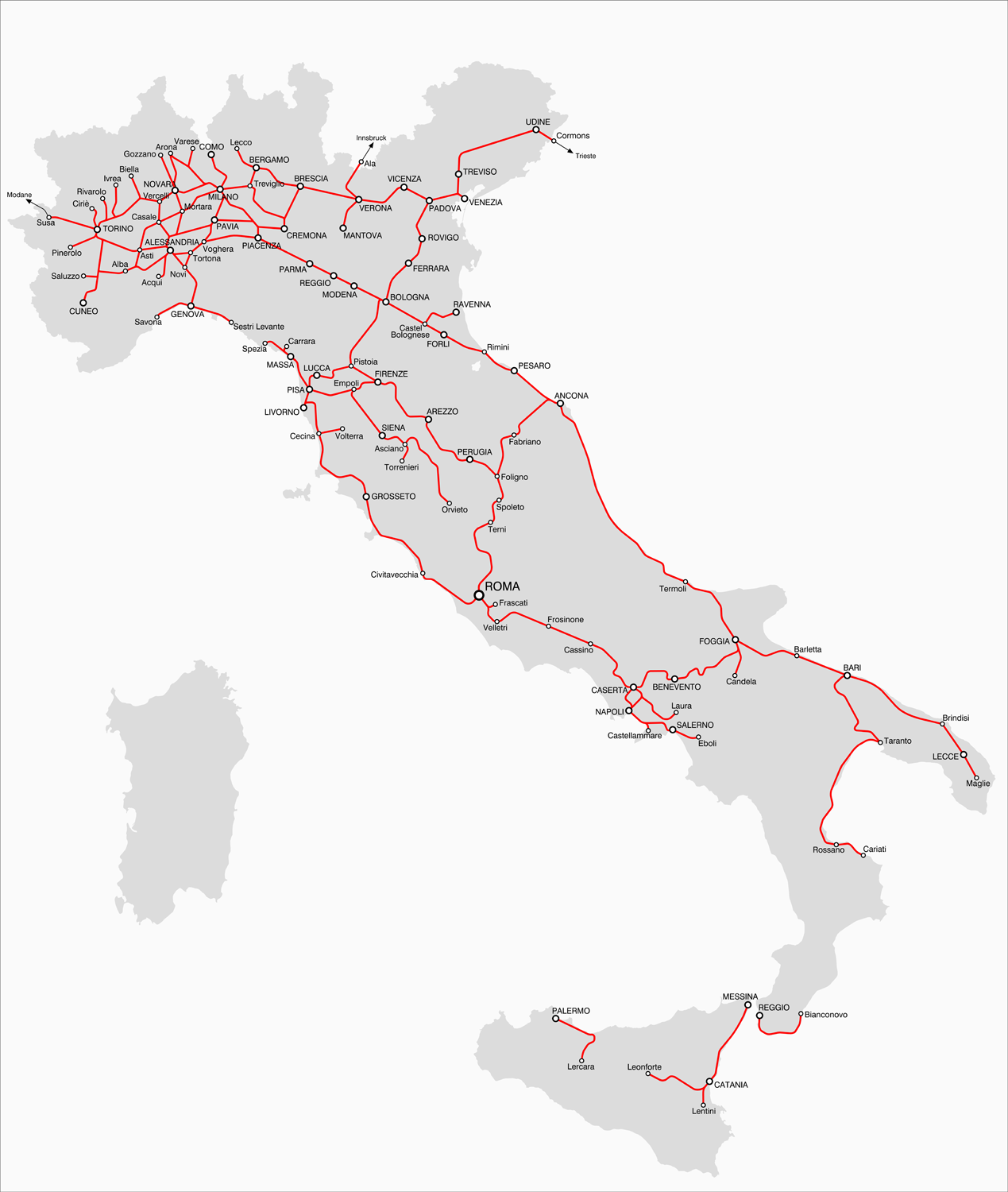
Network as of 20 September 1870, when the Papal States was annexed to Italy

In the Kingdom of Sardinia (comprising Piedmont, Liguria and Sardinia), King Charles Albert ordered on 18 July 1844 the construction of the Turin–Genoa railway, which was inaugurated on 18 December 1853. This was followed by the opening of other sections which connected with France, Switzerland and Lombardy–Venetia. A locomotive factory was also founded in Genoa, in order to avoid the English monopoly in the field. This became the modern Ansaldo.

In Tuscany, the Duke of Lucca signed the concession for the Lucca–Pisa railway, while, in 1845, the Duchy of Parma began the construction of two lines towards Piacenza and Modena. In the Papal States, Pope Gregory XVI opposed railways but Pope Pius IX took a more liberal view. Some lines were begun in 1846 under Pius IX with the Rome and Frascati Rail Road then the Rome and Civitavecchia Rail Road.

In the course of the Wars of Italian Independence railways proved to be instrumental in the defeat of Charles Albert's army at Peschiera, as well as in the Austrian defeats at Palestro and Magenta: in the latter French troops were able to reach the battlefield quickly thanks to the new means of transport and established a defence line right on the ballast of the line.

At the creation of the unified Kingdom of Italy (17 March 1861), railways in the country were the following:

Piedmont	850 km (530 mi)
Lombardy–Venetia	522 km (324 mi)
Tuscany	257 km (160 mi)
Papal State	317 km (197 mi) (year 1870)
Kingdom of the Two Sicilies	128 km (80 mi)

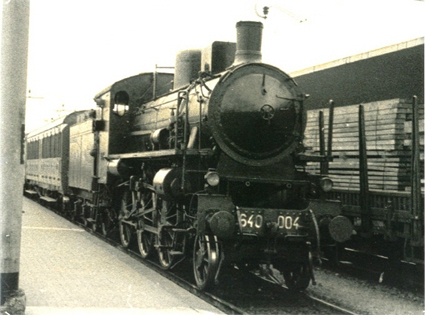
An Italian FS 640 steam locomotive

for a total of 2,064 km (1,283 mi) active railways. Lines in the Papal States were still under construction, whilst Sicily had its first, short railway only in 1863 (Palermo-Bagheria). In 1870 the last remnant of the Papal States was also annexed to Italy: it comprised the railway connection from Rome to Frascati, Civitavecchia, Terni and Cassino (through Velletri). In 1872 there were in Italy about 7,000 km (4,300 mi) of railways. After unification, construction of new lines was boosted: in 1875, with the completion of the section Orte-Orvieto, the direct Florence–Rome line was completed, reducing the travel time of the former route passing through Foligno-Terontola. As of 2011, the Italian railway system is one of the most important parts of the infrastructure of Italy, with a total length of 24,227 km (15,054 mi).

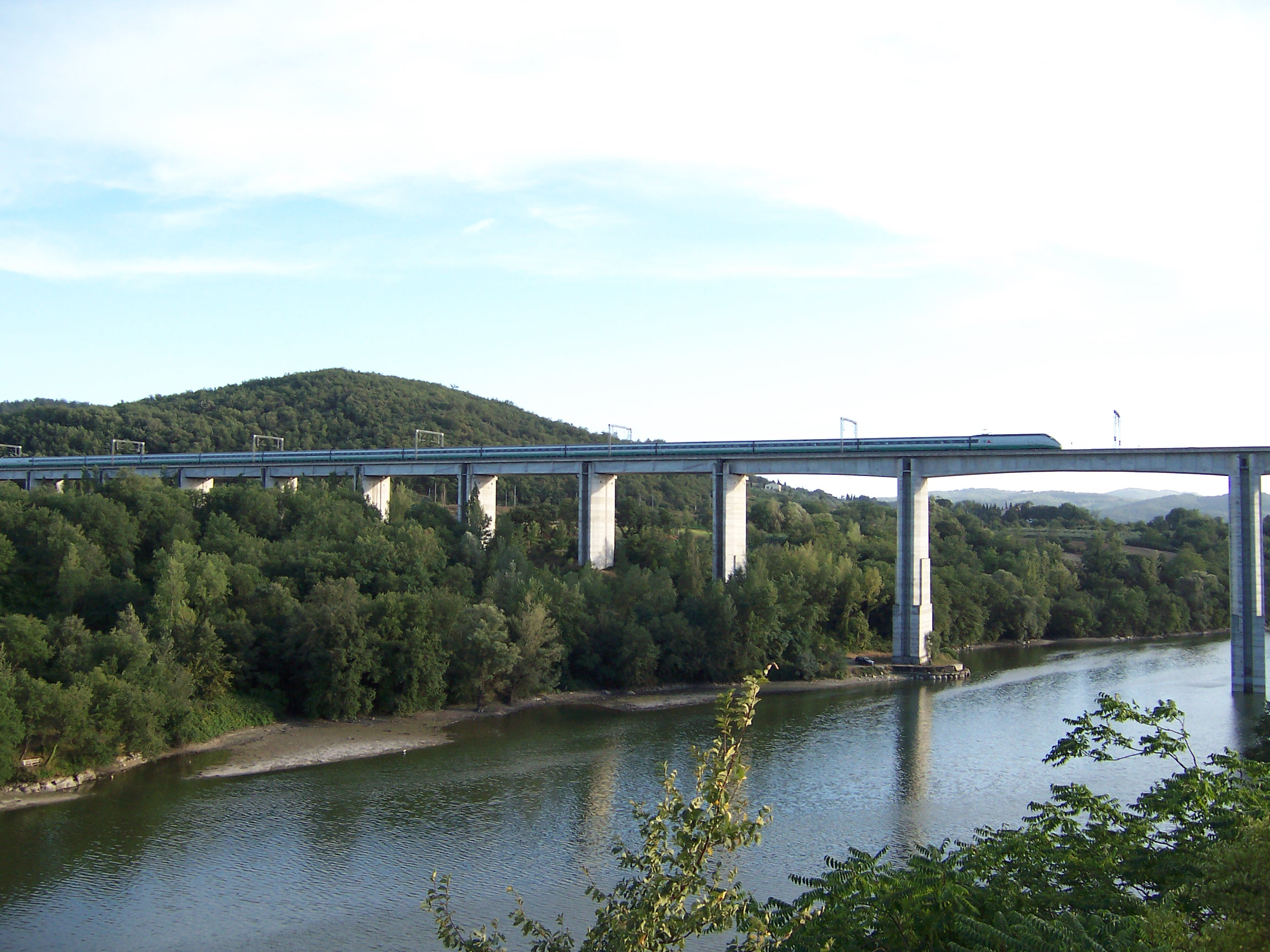
An Italian ETR 500 train running on the Florence–Rome high-speed line near Arezzo, Italy, the first high-speed railway opened in Europe.

In the 1960s, the FS started an innovative project for high speed trains. E.444 locomotives were the first standard locomotives able to reach 200 km/h (125 mph), while an ALe 601 EMU reached a speed of 240 km/h (150 mph) during a test. Other EMUs, such as the ETR 220, ETR 250 and ETR 300 were also updated for speeds up to 200 km/h (125 mph). The braking systems of cars were updated to fit the increased travelling speeds.

On 25 June 1970, construction of the Florence–Rome Direttissima was started. The line was the first high-speed line opened in Europe when more than half of it opened on 24 February 1977. This included the 5.375 km (3.340 mi) bridge over the Paglia river, then the longest in Europe. However, the project was completed only in the early 1990s.

==== Netherlands ====
Rail transport in the Netherlands is generally considered to have begun on 20 September 1839 when the first train, drawn by the locomotive De Arend, successfully made the 16 km trip from Amsterdam to Haarlem. However, the first plan for a railroad in the Netherlands was launched only shortly after the first railroad opened in Britain.

The history of rail transport in the Netherlands can be described in six eras:

- the period up to 1839 – the first plans were made for a railroad,
- 1840–1860 – railroads experienced their early expansion,
- 1860–1890 – the government started ordering the construction of new lines,
- 1890–1938 – the different railroads were consolidated into two large railroads,
- 1938–1992 – Nederlandse Spoorwegen was granted a monopoly on rail transport, and
- 1992 to present – the Nederlandse Spoorwegen lost its monopoly.

==== Poland ====
The first Polish locomotive Ok22 (100 km/h) started operating in 1923. Since 1936, imported electric locomotives English Electric EL.100 (100 km/h) were in use in Warsaw. New Polish locomotive Pm36-1 (140 km/h) was shown at the International Exposition of Art and Technology in Modern Life in Paris in 1937.

New Polish electric locomotive EP09 (160 km/h) was designed in 1977 and started regular operation linking Warsaw and Kraków in 1987. On 14 December 2014 PKP Intercity New Pendolino trains by Alstom under the name 'Express Intercity Premium' began operating on the CMK line (224 km line from Kraków and Katowice to Warsaw) with trains reaching 200 km/h (124 mph) as a regularly scheduled operation.

==== Russia ====
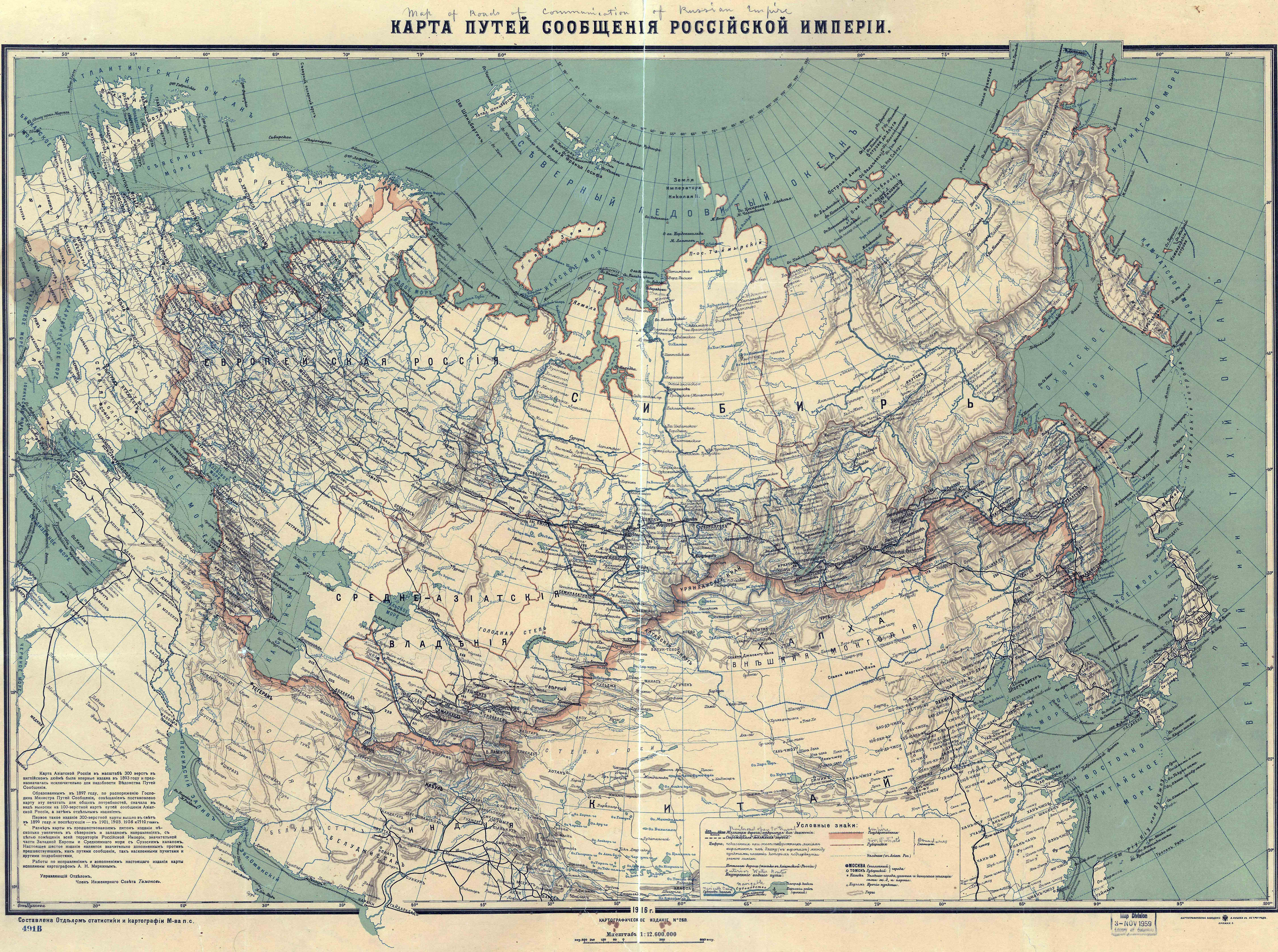
Map of Russian railroads in 1916

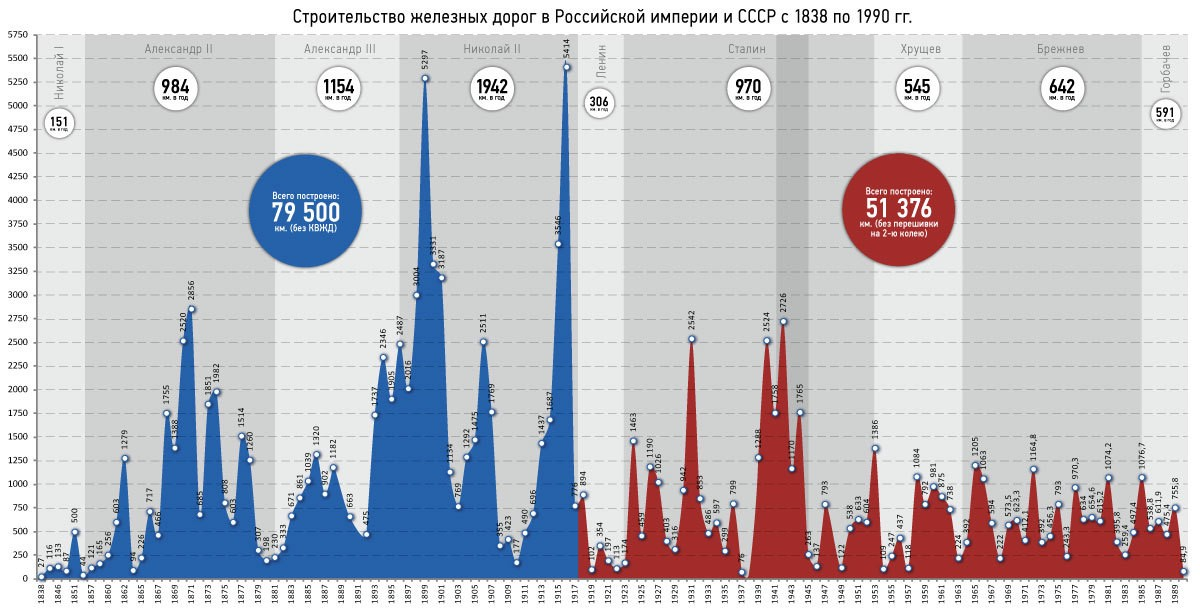
Russian railroads construction by year 1837–1989

In the early 1830s, the Cherepanovs, father and son inventors, built the first Russian steam locomotive. The first railway line was built in Russia in 1837 between Saint-Petersburg and Tsarskoye Selo. It was 27 km long and linked the Imperial Palaces at Tsarskoye Selo and Pavlovsk. The track gauge was 6 feet (1.8 metres). Russia was in need of big transportation systems and geographically suited to railroads, with long flat stretches of land and comparatively simple land acquisition. It was hampered, however, by political difficulties and a shortage of capital. Foreign initiative and capital were required. It was the Americans who brought the technology of railway construction to Russia. In 1842, planning began for the building of Russia's first important railway; it linked Moscow and St Petersburg.

==== Spain ====
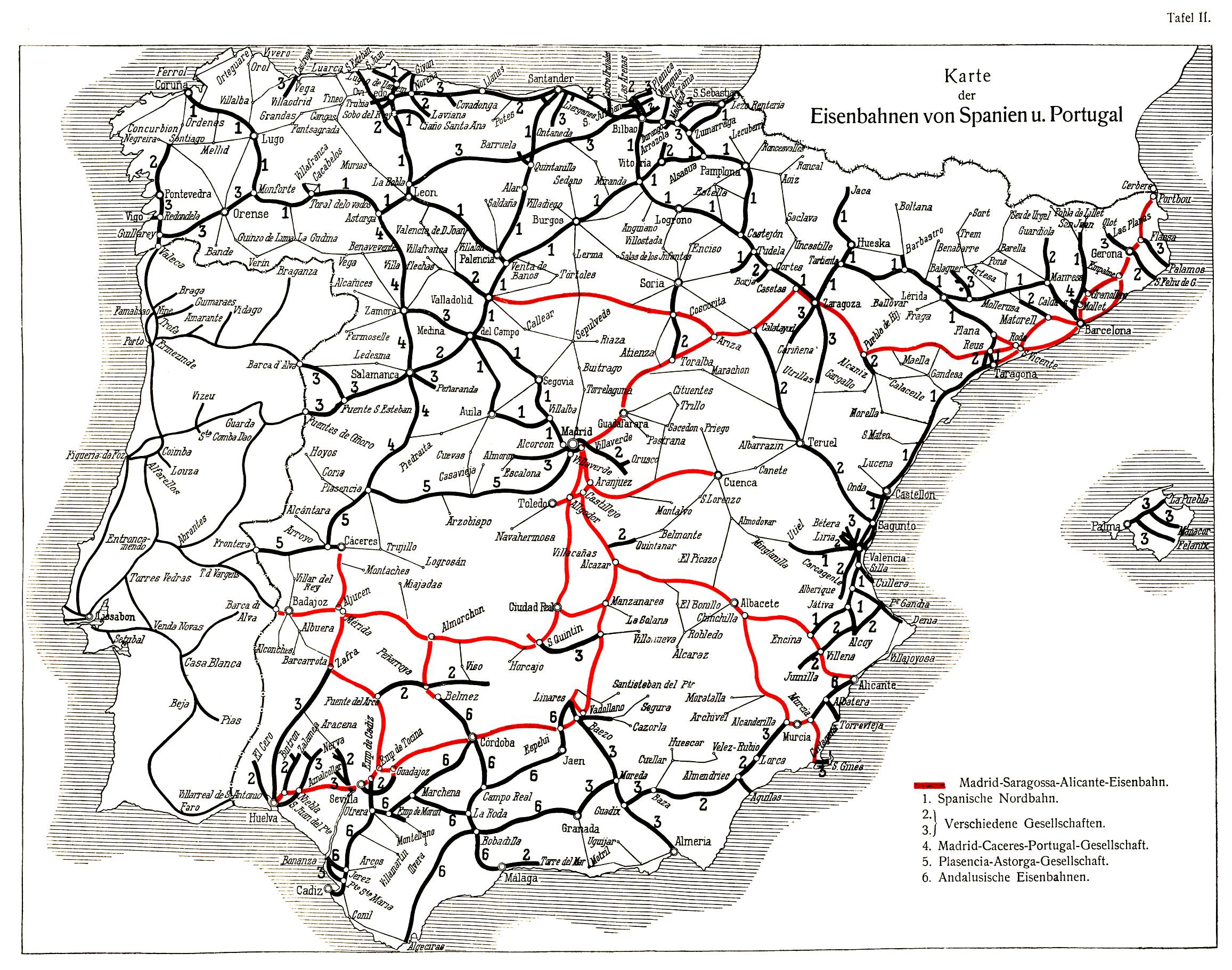
Map of railways of the Iberian peninsula (1921)

Cuba, then a Spanish province, built its first rail line in 1837. The history of rail transport in peninsular Spain begins in 1848 with the construction of a railway line between Barcelona and Mataró. In 1852, the first narrow gauge line was built. In 1863 a line reached the Portuguese border. By 1864, the Madrid-Irun line had been opened and the French border was reached.

=== North America ===
==== Canada ====
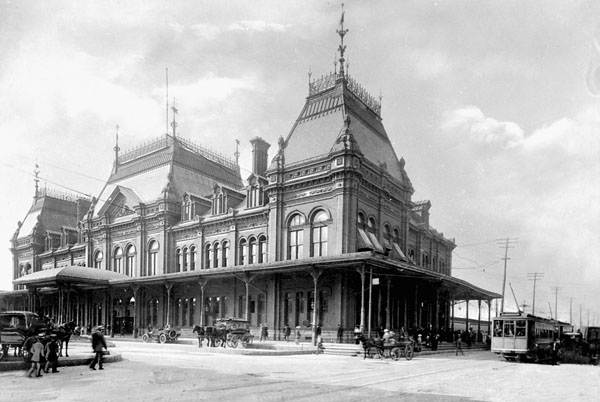
Grand Trunk's Bonaventure Station, Montreal, 1900s

The earliest railway in Canada was a wooden railway reportedly used in the construction of the French fortress at Louisburg, Nova Scotia. The first Canadian railway, the Champlain and St. Lawrence Railroad, was opened in 1836 outside of Montreal, a seasonal portage railway to connect river traffic. It was followed by the Albion Railway in Stellarton, Nova Scotia in 1840, a collier railway connecting coal mines to a seaport. In Canada, the national government strongly supported railway construction for political goals. First it wanted to knit the far-flung provinces together and second, it wanted to maximize trade inside Canada and minimize trade with the United States, to avoid becoming an economic satellite. The Grand Trunk Railway of Canada linked Toronto and Montreal in 1853, then opened a line to Portland, Maine (which was ice-free) and lines to Michigan and Chicago. By 1870 it was the longest railway in the world. The Intercolonial line, finished in 1876, linked the Maritimes to Quebec and Ontario, tying them to the new Confederation.

Anglo entrepreneurs in Montreal sought direct lines into the US and shunned connections with the Maritimes, with a goal of competing with American railroad lines heading west to the Pacific. Joseph Howe, Charles Tupper and other Nova Scotia leaders used the rhetoric of a "civilizing mission" centered on their British heritage, because Atlantic-centered railway projects promised to make Halifax the eastern terminus of an intercolonial railway system tied to London. Leonard Tilley, New Brunswick's most ardent railway promoter, championed the cause of "economic progress," stressing that Atlantic Canadians needed to pursue the most cost-effective transportation connections possible if they wanted to expand their influence beyond local markets. Advocating an intercolonial connection to Canada and a western extension into larger American markets in Maine and beyond, New Brunswick entrepreneurs promoted ties to the United States first, connections with Halifax second and routes into central Canada last. Thus metropolitan rivalries between Montreal, Halifax and Saint John led Canada to build more railway lines per capita than any other industrializing nation, even though it lacked capital resources and had too little freight and passenger traffic to allow the systems to turn a profit.

Den Otter (1997) challenges popular assumptions that Canada built transcontinental railways because it feared the annexationist schemes of aggressive Americans. Instead Canada overbuilt railroads because it hoped to compete with, even overtake Americans in the race for continental riches. It downplayed the more realistic Maritimes-based London-oriented connections and turned to utopian prospects for the farmlands and minerals of the west. The result was closer ties between north and south, symbolized by the Grand Trunk's expansion into the American Midwest. These economic links promoted trade, commerce and the flow of ideas between the two countries, integrating Canada into a North American economy and culture by 1880. About 700,000 Canadians migrated to the US in the late 19th century. The Canadian Pacific, paralleling the American border, opened a vital link to British Canada and stimulated settlement of the Prairies. The CP was affiliated with James J. Hill's American railways and opened even more connections to the South. The connections were two-way, as thousands of American moved to the Prairies after their own frontier had closed.

Two additional transcontinental lines were built to the west coast—three in all—but that was far more than the traffic would bear, making the system simply too expensive. One after another, the federal government was forced to take over the lines and cover their deficits. In 1923, the government merged the Grand Trunk, Grand Trunk Pacific, Canadian Northern and National Transcontinental lines into the new the Canadian National Railways system. Since most of the equipment was imported from Britain or the US and most of the products carried were from farms, mines or forests, there was little stimulation to domestic manufacturing. On the other hand, the railways were essential to the growth of the wheat regions in the Prairies and to the expansion of coal mining, lumbering and paper making. Improvements to the St. Lawrence waterway system continued apace and many short lines were built to river ports.

==== United States ====
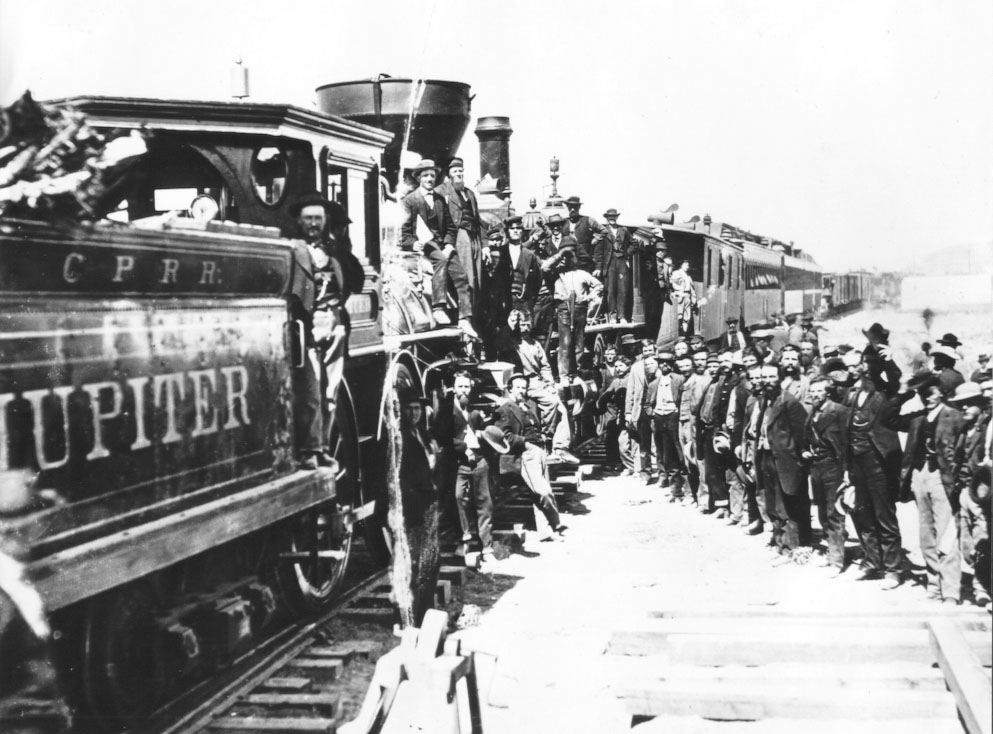
The First transcontinental railroad was completed in 1869.

===== Overview =====
Railroads played a large role in the development of the United States from the Industrial Revolution in the North-east 1810–1850 to the settlement of the West 1850–1890. The American railroad mania began with the Baltimore and Ohio Railroad in 1828 and flourished until the Panic of 1873 bankrupted many companies and temporarily stalled.

Railroads not only increased the speed of transport, but they also dramatically lowered its cost. For example, the first transcontinental railroad allowed passengers and freight to cross the country at one tenth the cost of stagecoach or wagon transport in a matter of days instead of months. With economical transportation in the West (which had been referred to as the "Great American Desert"), farming, ranching, and mining was more profitable. As a result, railroads transformed the country, particularly the West (which had few navigable rivers).

Although the South started building railways early, it concentrated on short lines linking cotton regions to oceanic or river ports, and the absence of an interconnected network was a major handicap during the Civil War. In contrast, the North and Midwest had constructed networks that linked every city by 1860. In the heavily settled Midwestern Corn Belt, over 80 percent of farms were within 10 miles of a railway, facilitating the shipment of grain, hogs and cattle to national and international markets. A large number of short lines were built, but thanks to a fast developing financial system based on Wall Street and oriented to railway bonds, the majority were consolidated into 20 trunk lines by 1890. State and local governments often subsidized lines but rarely owned them.

The system was largely built by 1910, but soon, freight traffic shifted to trucks and passengers increasingly used automobiles and later airplanes, leading to a decline in railway use. Diesel electric locomotives (after 1940) made for much more efficient operations that needed fewer workers on the road and in repair shops.

===== Mileage =====
Route mileage peaked at 254,000 miles (409,000 km) in 1916 and fell to 140,000 miles (230,000 km) by 2009.

In 1830, there were about 75 miles (121 km) of railroad track in short lines linked to coal and granite mines.). Railroad lines expanded rapidly. By 1840, ten years later, the railways had grown to 2,800 miles (4,500 km). By 1860, on the eve of civil war, the length had reached 29,000 miles (47,000 km), mostly in the North. The South had much less track, and the track they had was geared to moving cotton short distances to river or ocean ports. The Southern railroads were destroyed during the war but were soon rebuilt. By 1890, the national system was virtually complete with 164,000 miles (264,000 km).

Railroad Accumulated Mileage by Region
	1830	1840	1850	1860	1870	1880	1890
ME, NH, VT, MA, RI, CT	29.80	513.34	2,595.57	3,644.24	4,326.73	5,888.09	6,718.19
NY, PA, OH, MI, IN, MD, DE, NJ, DC		1,483.76	3,740.36	11,927.21	18,291.93	28,154.73	40,825.60
VA, WV, KY, TN, MS, AL, GA, FL, NC, SC	10.00	737.33	2,082.07	7,907.79	10,609.60	14,458.33	27,833.15
IL, IA, WI, MO, MN			46.48	4,951.47	11,030.85	22,212.98	35,579.80
LA, AR & OK (Indian) Territory		20.75	107.00	250.23	331.23	1,621.11	5,153.91
(Terr.)ND/SD, NM, WY, MT, ID, UT, AZ, WA (States)NE, KS, TX, CO, CA, NV, OR				238.85	4,577.99	15,466.18	47,451.47
TOTAL USA	39.80	2,755.18	8,571.48	28,919.79	49,168.33	87,801.42	163,562.12

In 1869, the symbolically important transcontinental railroad was completed in the United States with the driving of a golden spike (near the city of Ogden).

=== Latin America ===
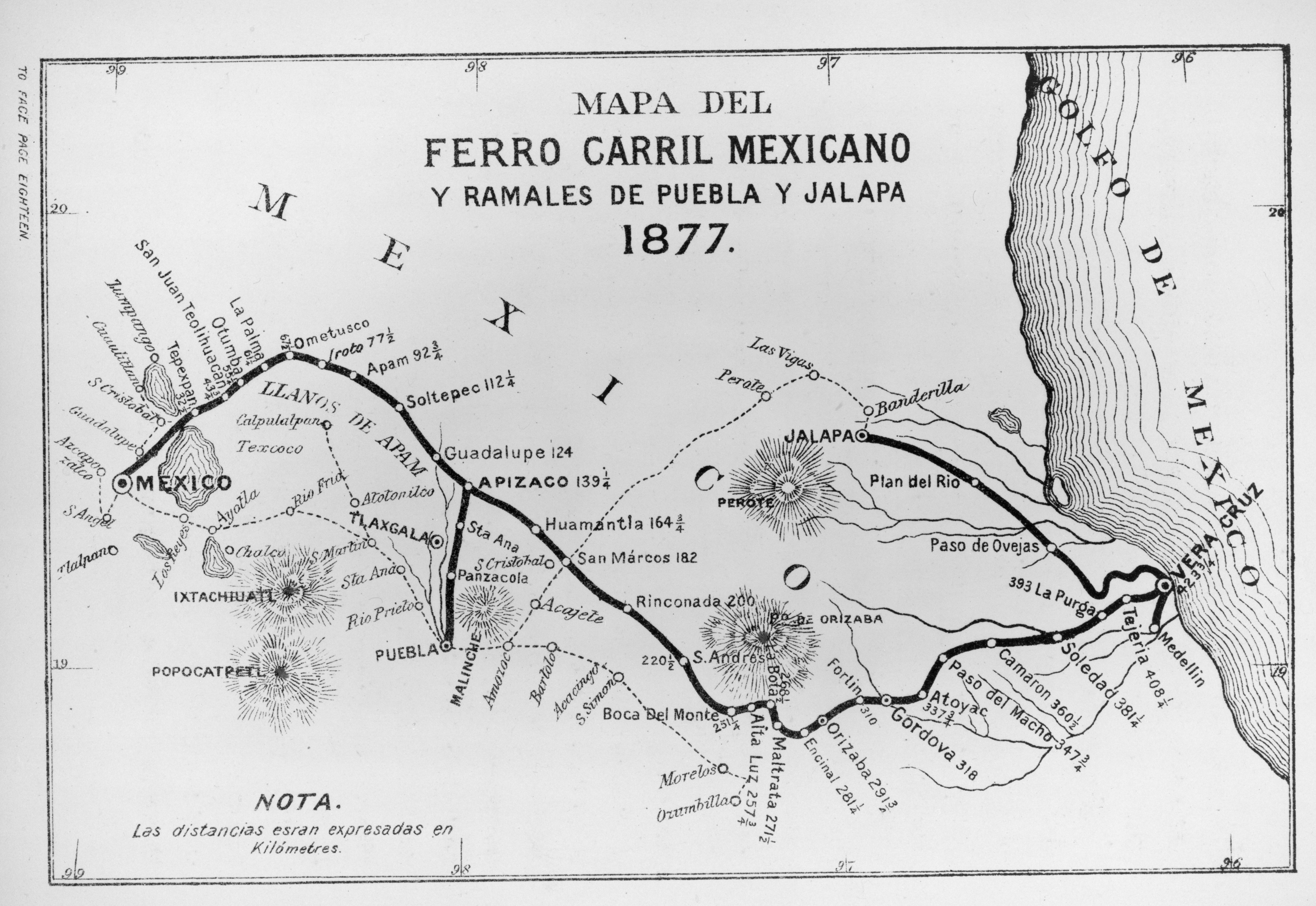
Map of first Mexican rail line between Veracruz and Mexico City

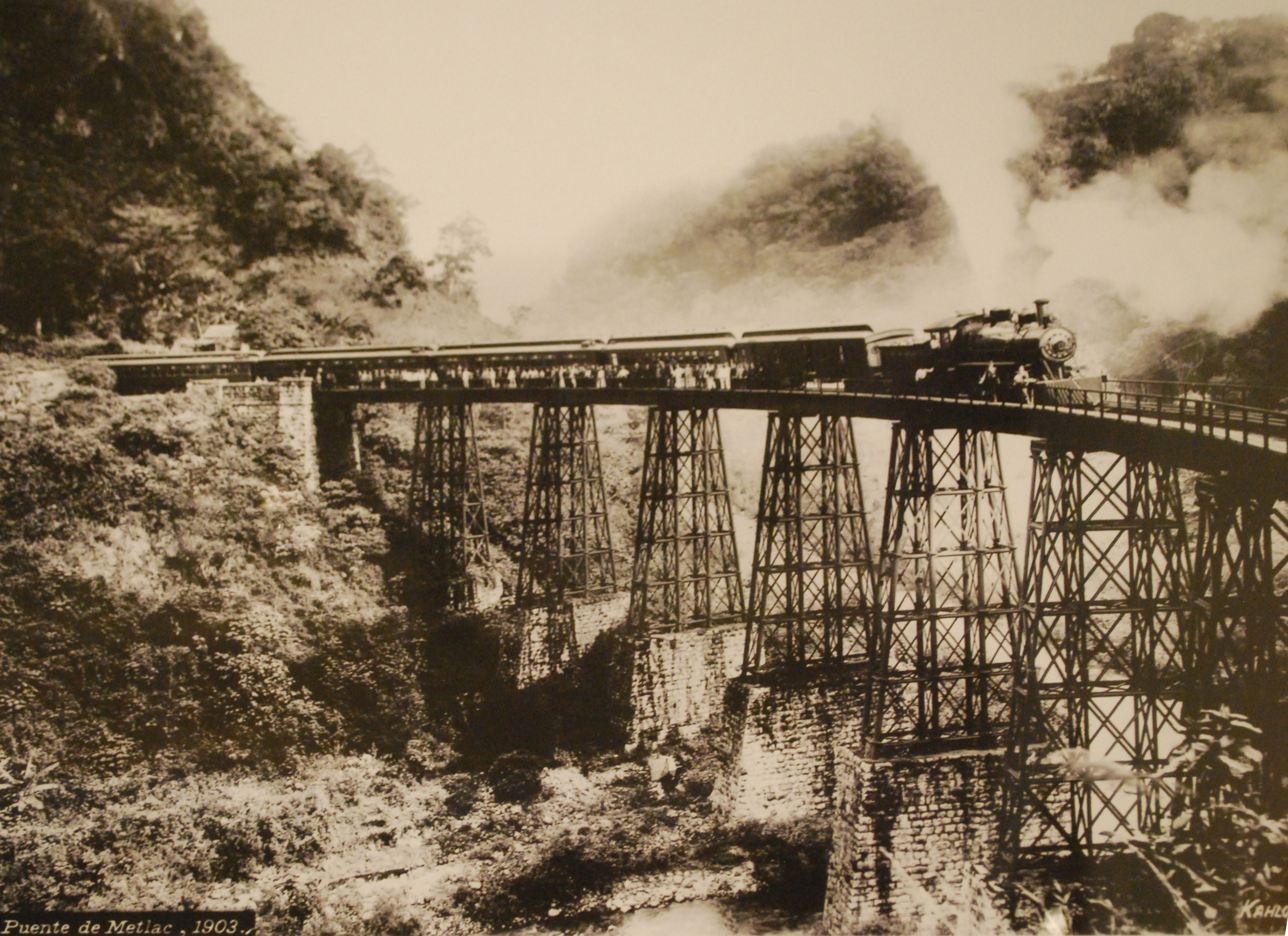
Mexican railway bridge, an example of engineering that overcame geographical barriers and allowed efficient movement of goods and people.

In the late 19th and early 20th centuries, railways were critical elements in the early stages of modernizing the Latin American economy, especially by linking agricultural regions to export-oriented seaports. After 1870, Latin American governments encouraged further rail development through generous concessions that included government subsidies for construction. "Increasing exports of primary commodities, rising imports of capital goods, the expansion of activities drawing directly and indirectly on overseas investment, the rising share of manufacturing in output, and a generalized increase in the pace and scope of economic activity were all tied closely to the timing and character of the region's infrastructural development."

The speed of railway line construction varied, but by 1870 railway line construction was underway throughout Latin America, with Cuba leading with the largest railway track in service (1,295 km), followed by Chile (797 km), Brazil (744 km), Argentina (732 km), Peru (669 km), and Mexico (417 km). By 1900, Argentina (16,563 km), Brazil (15,316 km), and Mexico (13,615 km) were the leaders in length of track in service, and Peru, which had been an early leader in railway construction, had stagnated (1,790 km). In Mexico, growing nationalistic fervor led the government to bring the bulk of the nation's railroads under national control in 1909, with a new government corporation, Ferrocarriles Nacionales de México (FNM), that exercised control of the main trunk rail lines through a majority of share ownership.

=== Asia ===
==== India ====
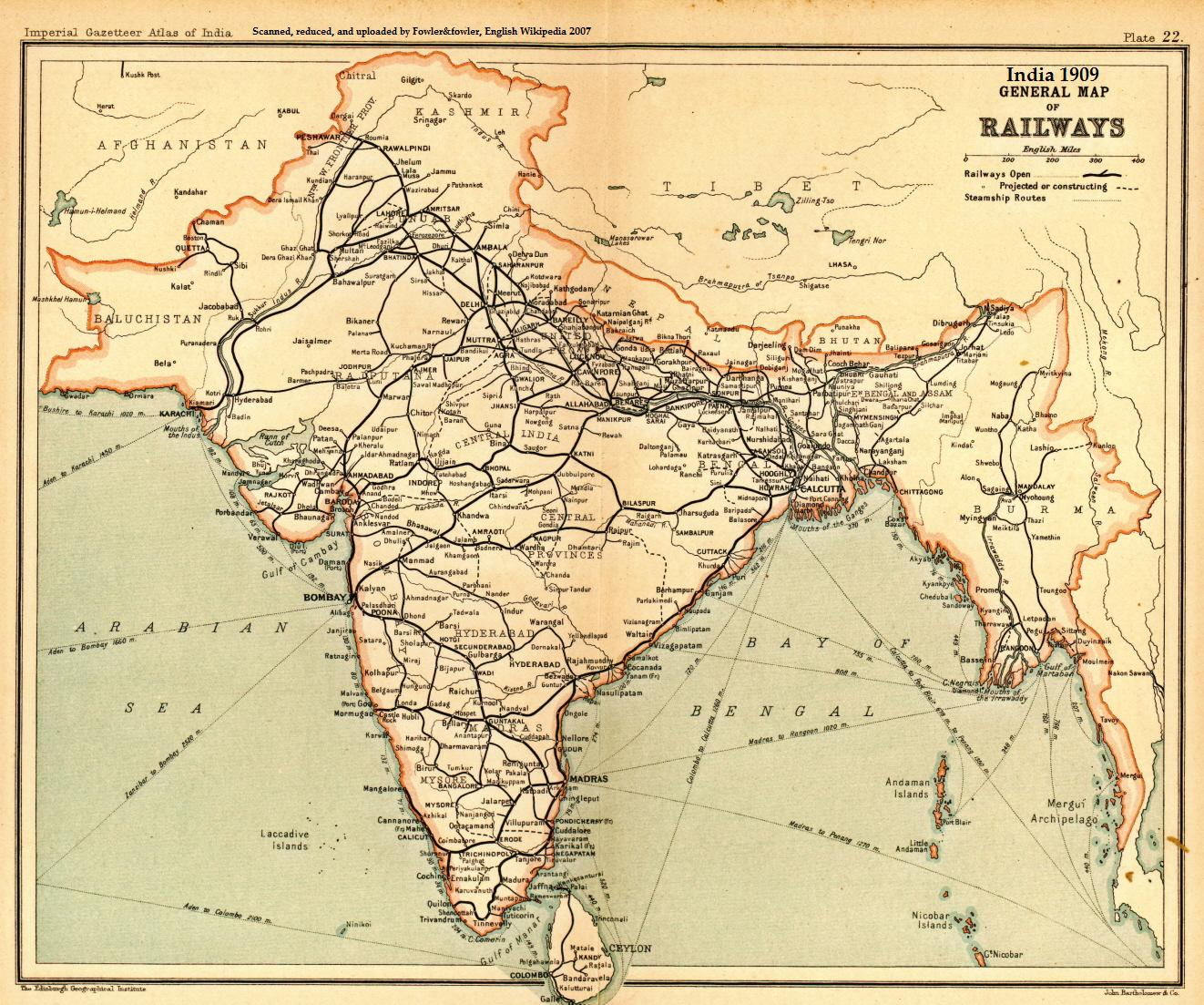
The 1909 map of railways in India

The first proposals for railways in India were made in Madras in 1832. The first train in India ran from Red Hills to Chintadripet bridge in Madras in 1837. It was called Red Hill Railway. It was hauled by a rotary steam engine locomotive manufactured by William Avery. It was built by Sir Arthur Cotton. It was primarily used for transporting granite stones for road building work in Madras. In 1845, a railway was built at Dowleswaram in Rajahmundry. It was called Godavari Dam Construction Railway. It was also built by Arthur Cotton. It was used to supply stones for construction of a dam over Godavari.

On 8 May 1845, Madras Railway was incorporated. In the same year, the East India Railway company was incorporated. On 1 August 1849, Great Indian Peninsular Railway (GIPR) was incorporated. In 1851, a railway was built in Roorkee. It was called Solani Aqueduct Railway. It was hauled by steam locomotive Thomason, named after a British officer-in-charge. It was used for transporting construction materials for building of aqueduct over Solani river. In 1852, the "Madras Guaranteed Railway Company" was incorporated.

The first passenger train in India ran between Bombay (Bori Bunder) and Thane on 16 April 1853. The 14-carriage train was hauled by three steam locomotives: Sahib, Sindh and Sultan. It ran for about 34 kilometers between these two cities carrying 400 people. The line was built and operated by GIPR. This railway line was built in 1,676 mm (5 ft 6 in) broad gauge, which became the standard for the railways in the country. The first passenger railway train in eastern India ran from Howrah, near Calcutta to Hoogly, for distance of 24 miles, on 15 August 1854. The line was built and operated by EIR. The first passenger train in South India ran from Royapuram / Veyasarapady (Madras) to Wallajah Road (Arcot) on 1 July 1856, for a distance of 60 miles. It was built and operated by Madras Railway. On 24 February 1873, the first tramway (a horse-drawn tramway) opened in Calcutta between Sealdah and Armenian Ghat Street, a distance of 3.8 km.

==== Iran ====
Iranian railway history goes back to 1887 when an approximately 20-km long railway between Tehran and Ray was established. After this time many short railways were constructed but the main railway, Trans-Iranian Railway, was started in 1927 and operated in 1938 by connecting the Persian Gulf to the Caspian Sea.

==== Japan ====
In 1867, in Japan, Edo period (Tokugawa shogunate) and its feudal system was ended, then Meiji period was entered and the government strived to acquire western culture and technology. In 1872, the first railway in Japan was inaugurated by Japanese Government Railways (JGR), connecting Shimbashi in Tokyo and Yokohama. The first 10 steam locomotives were ordered to Avonside, Dübs, Sharp Stewart, Vulcan and Yorkshire companies in United Kingdom. Subsequently, so many locomotives and railroad cars were ordered to United Kingdom, United States and Germany, before they could be manufactured in Japan. At that time, JGR adopted narrow gauge (1,067 mm) rather than standard gauge (1,435 mm), considering its cost of construction, so still now, narrow gauge has been mostly adopted and called "standard gauge in Japan". In 1874, the second railway connected between Osaka and Kobe by JGR. Following them, railways were spread around Japan, Hokkaido, Tōhoku, Kantō, Chūbu, Kansai, Chūgoku, Shikoku and Kyushu regions by JGR and many private companies. In 1895, the first electric railway, also the first electric street railway was inaugurated by Kyoto Electric Railway in Kyoto, and the first trams seems to be ordered to J. G. Brill in the United States. In 1923, the first diesel locomotive was ordered to Deutz AG in Germany by Horinouchi Railway Company in Shizuoka prefecture. In 1927, the first subway was inaugurated by Tokyo Metro, and connected between Ueno and Asakusa in Tokyo, and the electric railroad cars were ordered to Nippon Sharyo as Class 1000. Then, in 1928, the first diesel railroad car, equipped with diesel engine of MAN AG, was ordered and manufactured by Amemiya Manufacturing, for Nagaoka Railway in Niigata prefecture.

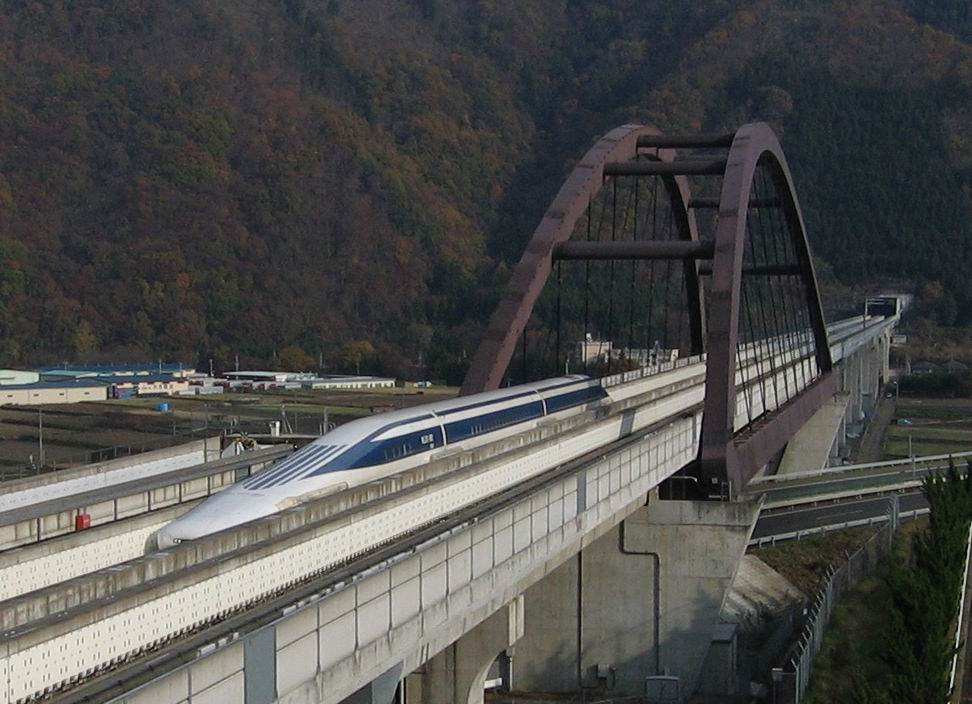
Japanese Maglev train

Viewing the development of locomotive and railroad car technology in Japan, in 1893, the first steam locomotive was manufactured by Kobe works of JGR as JGR Class 860. Then in 1904, the first electric railroad car seems to be manufactured by Iidabashi works of Kōbu railway (now Chūō Main Line of JR East) as Class 950. In 1926, the first electric locomotive was manufactured by Hitachi as JGR Class ED15. In 1927, the first diesel locomotive, equipped with diesel engine of Niigata Engineering, was manufactured by Amemiya Manufacturing. By World War II, Japan also suffered catastrophic damage, however they accomplished reconstruction. In 1964, the first electric high-speed rail in the world, Tōkaidō Shinkansen (standard gauge) was inaugurated by Japanese National Railways (JNR), and connected between Tokyo and Osaka. The first high-speed trains were manufactured by Kawasaki Heavy Industries, Nippon Sharyo, Hitachi, Kinki Sharyo and Tokyu Car Corporation (now J-TREC), as Shinkansen 0 Series. Today, Electric, battery electric, electric hybrid, electric-diesel, diesel locomotives, railroad cars, high-speed trains, and AGTs are manufacrured by Hitachi, Kawasaki, Nippon Sharyo, Kinki Sharyo, J-TREC and Mitsubishi Heavy Industries, and they are running around the world.

==== Pakistan ====
It was in 1847 when the first railway was imagined but it was not until 1861 when it came into existence in the form of the railway built from Karachi to Kotri. Since then rail transport is a popular mode of non-independent transport in Pakistan.

==== Turkey ====
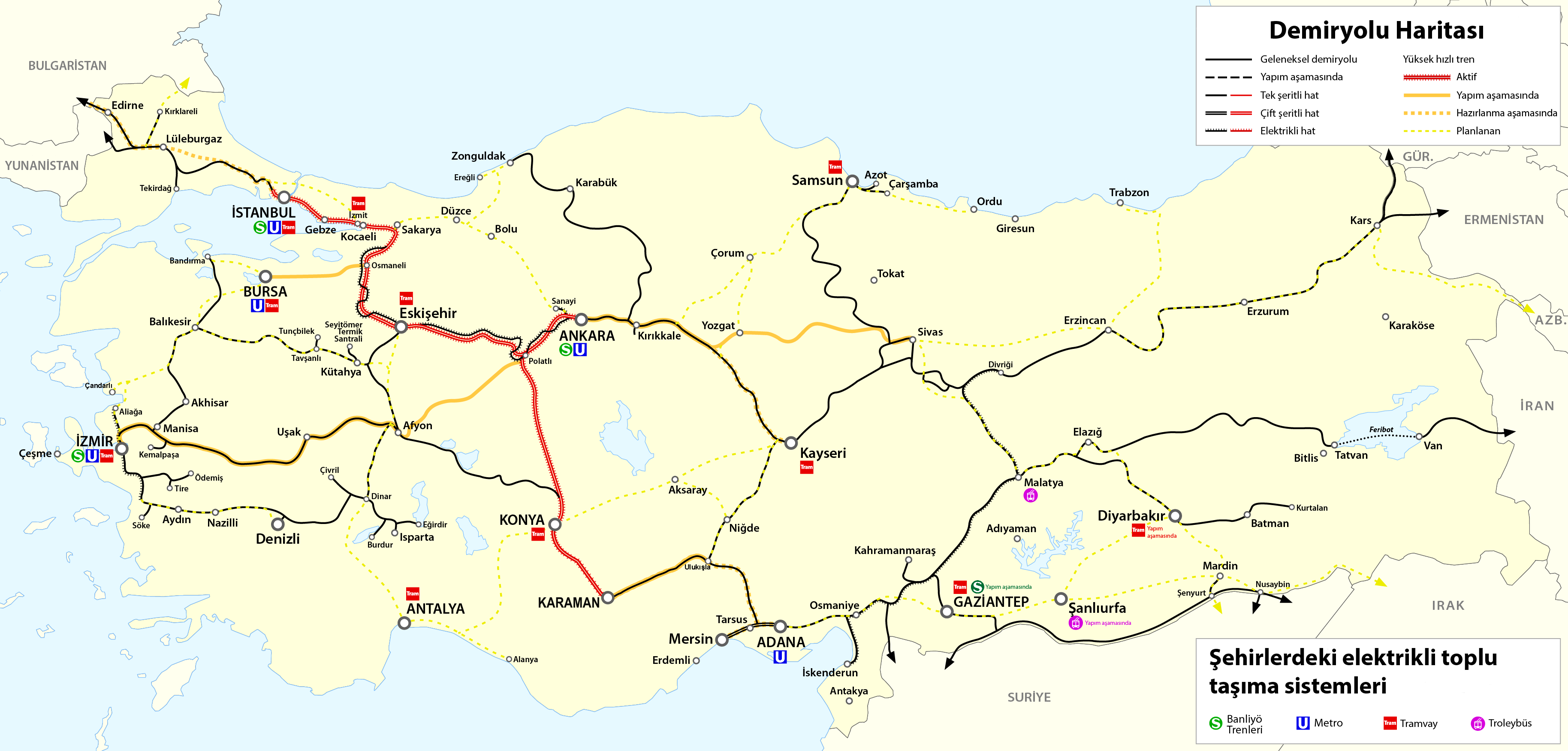
Rail transport map of Turkey

Rail technology was introduced to the Ottoman Empire in 1850s, with the first railway in the empire built in 1854 by the British between Cairo and Alexandria. In the modern boundaries of Turkey the first railway was inaugurated in 1858, departing from Smyrna, modern day Izmir. The British, French and Germans competed in the construction of rail projects in the Ottoman Empire.

=== Africa ===
==== East Africa ====
The railway was built from the Kenyan port of Mombasa to Kampala, Uganda, and construction was hampered by the presence of man-eating lions.

==== Egypt ====
===== 1833–1877 =====
Robert Stephenson (1803–59) was the engineer of Egypt's first railway

In 1833, Muhammad Ali Pasha considered building a railway between Suez and Cairo to improve transit between Europe and India. Muhammad Ali had proceeded to buy the rail when the project was abandoned due to pressure by the French who had an interest in building a canal instead.

Proposed railway from Cairo to the Sea of Suez by Charles Cheffins, 1840s; state carriage by Wason Manufacturing built for Sa'id Pasha for state functions, included with 161 less ornate railcars sent by the company in 1860

Muhammad Ali died in 1848, and in 1851 his successor Abbas I contracted Robert Stephenson to build Egypt's first standard gauge railway. The first section, between Alexandria on the Mediterranean coast and Kafr el-Zayyat on the Rosetta branch of the Nile was opened in 1854. This was the first railway in the Ottoman Empire as well as Africa and the Middle East. In the same year Abbas died and was succeeded by Sa'id Pasha, in whose reign the section between Kafr el-Zayyat and Cairo was completed in 1856 followed by an extension from Cairo to Suez in 1858. This completed the first modern transport link between the Mediterranean and the Indian Ocean, as Ferdinand de Lesseps did not complete the Suez Canal until 1869.

==== Namibia (South West Africa) ====
The first railway in the German colony of South West Africa was the 18 kilometres (11 mi)-long line running North-East from Walvis Bay to connect with the existing road between Swakopmund and Windhoek. It was built to 2 ft 6 in (762 mm) gauge and was opened in 1898.

==== Morocco ====
The Moroccan rail transport was first developed around 1906 and later during the French and Spanish protectorate. It functioned initially as a means to transport natural resources from in-land mines to the harbors. It was also used to move colonial troops.

==== Other countries ====
- Algerian National Rail Transportation Company
- History of rail transport in Burundi
- History of rail transport in Cameroon
- History of rail transport in the Central African Republic
- History of rail transport in the Comoros
- History of rail transport in Equatorial Guinea
- Eritrean Railway
- Rail transport in Ethiopia#History
- Rail transport in Ghana
- Rail transport in Guinea
- Rail transport in Kenya#History
- History of rail transport in Lesotho
- History of rail transport in Liberia
- Rail transport in Libya#History
- History of rail transport in Madagascar
- History of rail transport in Malawi
- History of rail transport in Mauritania
- History of rail transport in Mauritius
- History of rail transport in Rwanda
- Sierra Leone Government Railway
- History of rail transport in Tanzania
- History of rail transport in Togo

== See also ==
- Category:Rail transport timelines
- George Bradshaw, originator of the railway timetable
- History of the railway track
- History of trams
- John Blenkinsop (1783–1831), inventor
- List of years in rail transport
- Matthias W. Baldwin (1795–1866), manufacturer
- Mergers and acquisitions in the United States railroad industry
- Oldest railroads in North America
- Railway speed record
- South American Railway Congress
- Thomas Gray (1788–1848), railway advocate, published 1st ed. of Observations on a General Iron Railway, 1820.
- Timeline of railway history

== Bibliography ==
- Cameron, Rondo E. France and the Economic Development of Europe, 1800–1914: Conquests of Peace and Seeds of War (1961), pp. 304–227 covers France, Spain Russia and others
- Churella, Albert J. (1998). From Steam to Diesel: Managerial Customs and Organizational Capabilities in the Twentieth-Century American Locomotive Industry. Princeton, New Jersey: Princeton University Press. ISBN 978-0-691-02776-0.
- Coatsworth, John H. "Indispensable Railroads in a Backward Economy: The Case of Mexico", Journal of Economic History (1979) 39#4 pp. 939–960 in JSTOR
- Duffy, Michael C. Electric Railways: 1880-1990 (2003).
- Fraser, P. M. (1961), "The ΔΙΟΛΚΟΣ of Alexandria", The Journal of Egyptian Archaeology, 47: 134–138, doi:10.2307/3855873, JSTOR 3855873
- Fremdling, Rainer. "Railroadss and German Economic Growth: A Leading Sector Analysis with a Comparison to the United States and Great Britain", Journal of Economic History (1977) 37#3 pp. 583–604. in JSTOR
- Gwyn, David. The coming of the railway: a new global history.Yale University Press, 2023
- Hadfield, C. and Skempton, A. W. William Jessop, Engineer (Newton Abbot 1979)
- Hastings, Paul. Railroads: An International History (Ernest Benn, 1972)
- Jenks, Leland H. "Railroads as an Economic Force in American Development", The Journal of Economic History, vol. 4, no. 1 (May 1944), 1–20. in JSTOR
- Keys, C. M. (August 1914). "Redrawing The Railroad Map of the World". The World's Work: A History of Our Time. XLIV (2): 414–425. Includes maps of major rail lines on all continents c. 1914
- Lewis, M J T (1970). Early Wooden Railways. London: Routledge Keegan Paul.
- Lewis, M. J. T., "Railways in the Greek and Roman world", in Guy, A. / Rees, J. (eds), Early Railways. A Selection of Papers from the First International Early Railways Conference (2001), pp. 8–19 (10–15)
- Misa, Thomas J. A Nation of Steel: The Making of Modern America, 1865–1925 (1995) chapter 1 'Dominance of Rails' online
- New, J R. (November 2004). "400 years of English railways – Huntingdon Beaumont and the early years". Backtrack. 18 (11): 660–665.
- Nock, O. S. ed. Encyclopedia of Railways (London, 1977), worldwide coverage, heavily illustrated
- O’Brien, Patrick. Railways and the Economic Development of Western Europe, 1830–1914 (1983)
- O'Brien, Patrick. The New Economic History of the Railways (Routledge, 2014)
- Omrani, Bijan Asia Overland: Tales of Travel on the Trans-Siberian and Silk Road Odyssey Publications, 2010 ISBN 962-217-811-1
- Otte, Thomas G. and Keith Neilson, eds. Railways and International Politics: Paths of Empire, 1848–1945 (Routledge, 2012) 11 essays by leading scholars
- Pinkepank, Jerry A. (1973). The Second Diesel Spotter's Guide. Milwaukee WI: Kalmbach Books. ISBN 978-0-89024-026-7.
- Riley, C. J. The Encyclopedia of Trains & Locomotives (2002)
- Savage, Christopher and T. C. Barker. Economic History of Transport in Britain (Routledge, 2012)
- Schivelbusch, Wolfgang. The railway journey: the industrialization of time and space in the nineteenth century (Univ of California Press, 2014)
- Skelton, Oscar D. (1916). The Railway Builders. Glasgow, Brook, & Company, Toronto.
- Stover, John. American Railways (2nd ed 1997)
- Clarke, Thomas Curtis (June 1888). "The Building of a Railway". Scribner's Magazine. III (6): 642–670. Includes numerous c. 1880 diagrams and illustrations
- Jack Simmons and Gordon Biddle (editors). The Oxford Companion to British Railway History: From 1603 to the 1990s (2nd ed 1999)
- Stover, John. The Routledge Historical Atlas of the American Railroads (2001)
- Summerhill, William R. "Big Social Savings in a Small Laggard Economy: Railroad-Led Growth in Brazil", Journal of Economic History (2005) 65#1 pp. 72–102 in JSTOR
- Wolmar, Christian. On the wrong line: How ideology and incompetence wrecked Britain's railways (Kemsing Publishing, 2005).
- Wolmar, Christian. Fire and steam: a new history of the railways in Britain (Atlantic Books, 2009).
- Wolmar, Christian. Engines of war: how wars were won & lost on the railways (PublicAffairs, 2010).
- Wolmar, Christian. Blood, iron, and gold: How the railroads transformed the world (Public Affairs, 2011).
- Wolmar, Christian. The great railroad revolution: The history of trains in America (PublicAffairs, 2012).
- Wolmar, Christian. The Iron Road: The Illustrated History of Railways (Dorling Kindersley, 2014).
- Wolmar, Christian. To the Edge of the World: The Story of the Trans-Siberian Express, the World's Greatest Railroad (PublicAffairs, 2014).
- Wolmar, Christian. Railways and the Raj: How the age of steam transformed India (Atlantic Books, 2017).

=== Historiography ===
- Hurd II, John and Ian J. Kerr, eds. India's railway history: a research handbook (Brill, 2012)
- Lee, Robert. "A Fractious Federation: Patterns in Australian Railway Historiography." Mobility in History(2013) 4#1 pp. 149–158
- McDonald, Kate. "Asymmetrical Integration: Lessons from a Railway Empire." Technology and Culture (2015) 56#1 pp. 115–149
- Pathak, Dev N. "Marian Aguiar, Tracking Modernity: India’s Railway and the Culture of Mobility." South Asia: Journal of South Asian Studies (2012) 35#4 pp. 900–901
- Salerno, Elena. "The Historiography of Railways in Argentina: Between Foreign Investment, Nationalism and Liberalism." Mobility in History (2014) 5#1 pp. 105–120
