= Robert Daglish =

Robert Daglish (1779-28 December 1865) was a colliery manager, mining, mechanical and civil engineer at the start of the railway era.

Daglish was born in North East England. He became a member of the Institution of Civil Engineers in 1830. He died at Orrell on 28 December 1865 and is buried at the Church of St Thomas the Martyr, Upholland. He had married Margaret Twizel in 1804. Their children included George (1805-1870), who became a surgeon and Robert.

Daglish moved to Lancashire in 1804 where he was employed by Lord Balcarres to manage Haigh Foundry and the adjacent Brock Mill Forge. While at Haigh he built pumping, winding and blast engines which in their day were described as "improved and efficient machines".

Around 1810, Daglish moved to Orrell where he was appointed manager of John Clarke's Orrell Colliery. Having seen the rack locomotives John Blenkinsop designed for the Middleton Railway near Leeds in 1812, under licence, he built the Yorkshire Horse to the same design as Blenkinsop's Salamanca. He converted the colliery wagonway between the collieries at Winstanley and the Leeds and Liverpool Canal at Crooke to a running track with stone sleepers and iron rails. The locomotive was built at Haigh Foundry. Under Daglish's management the colliery was extremely profitable. He built a second locomotive and said they each did the work of 14 horses saving the company about £500 per year.

Daglish supervised much of the construction work on the Bolton and Leigh Railway which opened in 1828. he rebuilt the locomotive, Novelty, for the St Helens and Runcorn Gap Railway in 1833. With his son, Robert who erected the machinery for that railway's inclined planes, they operated the line from 1839 until 1848. Daglish was consulted by other railway companies such as the Newcastle and Carlisle Railway in 1832 and the Great North of England Railway. He won a prize in the London and Birmingham Railway's competition for the best design for rail chairs. In North America, Daglish was consulted by the Baltimore and Susquehanna, the Boston and Providence, the New York and Harlem and Norwich and Worcester Railroads.

== Robert Daglish (1809-1883) ==
Daglish's son, Robert (1809-1883) was also an engineer. He trained with Hick and Rothwell in Bolton before moving to Lee Watson and Company's St Helens Iron Foundry. The foundry supplied machinery for mills, mines, waterworks, glassworks, and railways. Iron lattice truss bridges were supplied to the Liverpool and Bury Railway in 1846. He was also a railway contractor.
