= St Cross Church, Middleton =

St Cross
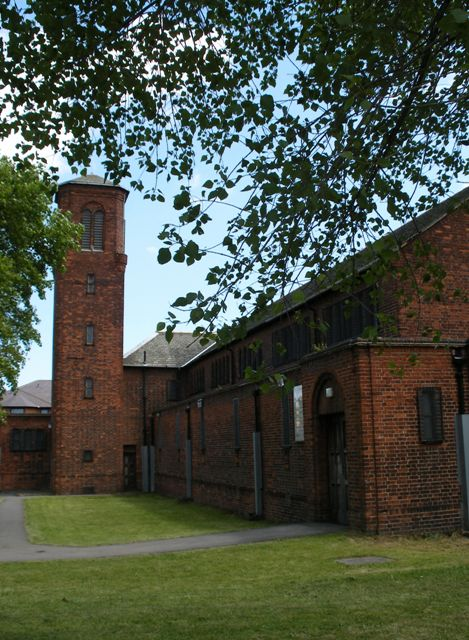
- St Cross
- 53.7435°N 1.5470°W
- OS grid reference: SE 29976 27558
- Location: Middleton, Leeds
- Country: England
- Denomination: Church of England
- Website: Parish of Middleton

History
- Status: Parish Church

Architecture
- Architect: F.L.Charlton
- Completed: 1933

Specifications
- Materials: Concrete frame, Brick faced

Administration
- Province: York
- Diocese: Leeds
- Archdeaconry: Leeds
- Deanery: Armley
- Parish: Middleton

The Church of St Cross is in Middleton, Leeds, West Yorkshire, England. It is an active Anglican church and part of the Armley deanery in the archdeaconry of Leeds, Diocese of Leeds.

== History ==
The parish of St Cross was taken out of the extensive parish of Middleton after the Middleton council housing estate was built in the 1920s and the population in the area increased dramatically. St Mary's Church acquired a site on which to build a mission church and a temporary wooden building was erected in 1925 with funds from the Leeds Church Extension Society. A permanent church was built in 1933 with funding from the diocese. St Cross was created a separate parish in July 1935.

A complete set of coins for 1933, including a 1933 penny, one of only seven known examples, was buried when the church's foundation stone was laid. The coins were found in 1970 to have been stolen.

== Structure ==
The church was designed in the Early Christian style by F.L.Charlton for the Church Forward Movement. It has a concrete frame and is clad in brick.

=== Exterior ===
The church has five bays with narrow single light rounded windows to the nave and a clerestory of narrow closely spaced rounded arched windows. The church has a north east Italianate campanile-style bell tower with a single bell. The tower is 60 feet high.

=== Interior ===
The nave is spanned by broad Gothic arches and there are five bay arcades with rounded arches. The walls are plastered. The altar, credence table and lectern were designed by Charlton and made by Robert Thompson of Kilburn who also made the aisle screens. The pulpit is from St John at Adel and a 19th-century font came from Ainderby Steeple. A crucifix made in Oberammergau came from Christ Church in Hunslet.

The interior was altered in 1982 when the rear two bays were partitioned to form a parish room and kitchen.
