= Middleton, Leeds =

Suburb of Leeds, West Yorkshire, England

Coordinates: 53.7428°N 1.5526°W

Middleton
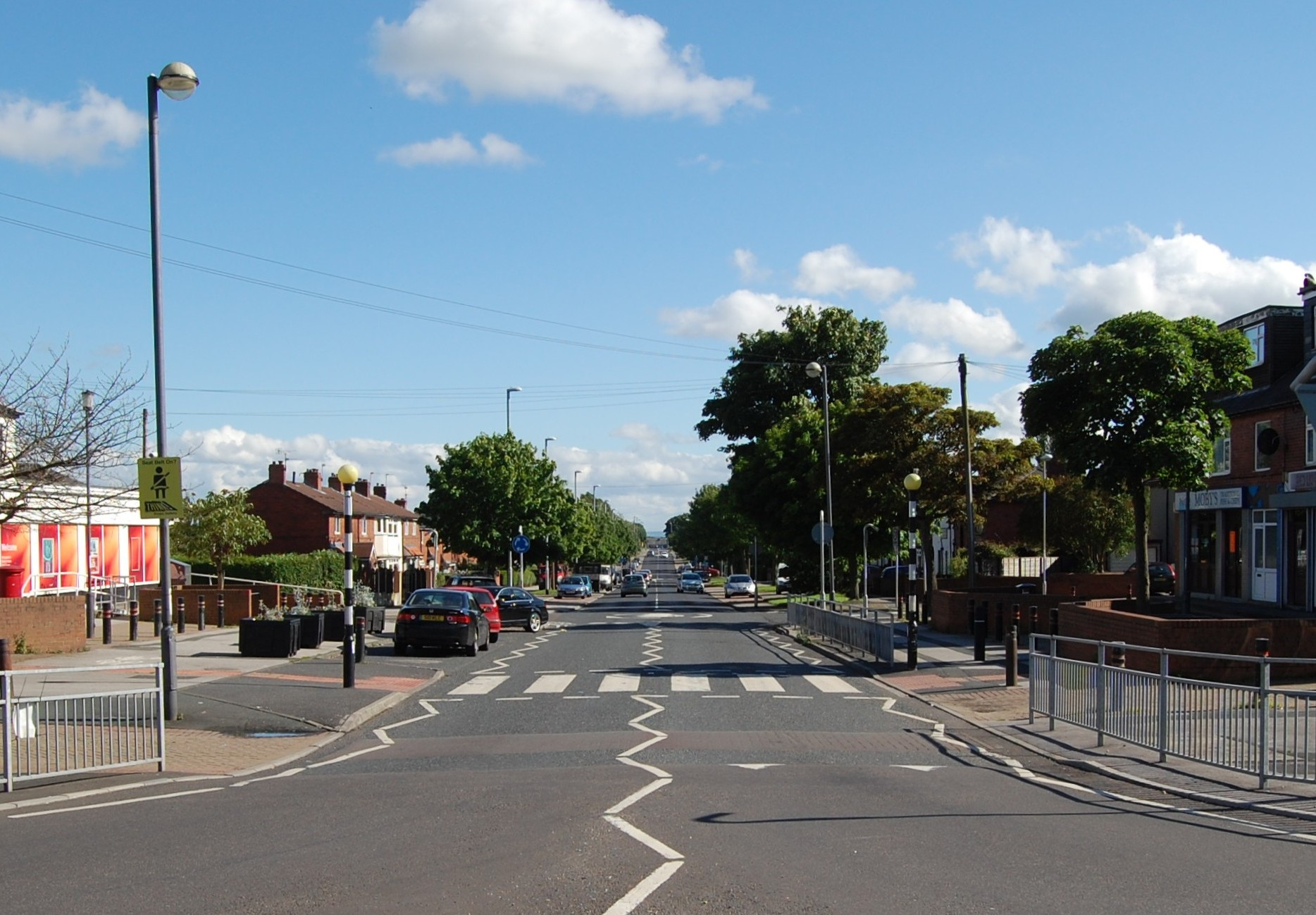
- Middleton Park Avenue

- Location within West Yorkshire
- Population: 31,472 (Leeds observatory health ref in 2020)
- OS grid reference: SE2927
- Metropolitan borough: City of Leeds
- Metropolitan county: West Yorkshire
- Region: Yorkshire and the Humber
- Country: England
- Sovereign state: United Kingdom
- Post town: LEEDS
- Postcode district: LS10
- Dialling code: 0113
- Police: West Yorkshire
- Fire: West Yorkshire
- Ambulance: Yorkshire
- UK Parliament: Leeds South

Middleton is a largely residential suburb of Leeds in West Yorkshire, England and historically a village in the West Riding of Yorkshire. It is situated on a hill 4 miles (6 km) south of Leeds city centre and 165 miles (266 km) north north-west of London.

It sits in the Middleton Park ward of Leeds City Council and Leeds South parliamentary constituency. The population of Middleton Park ward - which includes Belle Isle - was 31,472 at the 2020 Census.

Middleton was occupied before the Norman Conquest and recorded in the Domesday Book of 1086 as Mildetone. It developed as a manorial estate and its owners began to exploit the coal seams that outcropped within its boundaries. At the start of the Industrial Revolution a wooden wagonway was built to link the coal pits to Leeds. The colliery agent, John Blenkinsop designed an iron railway and its first steam-powered locomotive which was built by Matthew Murray in Holbeck. The coal mines on which the local economy was based lasted until 1968 and the railway is preserved and run by a trust after operating for 200 years.

Middleton Park, a remnant of the manorial estate, contains a large area of ancient woodland and parts of it, where coal was mined, are designated a scheduled ancient monument. It was the location of Middleton Hall and Middleton Lodge, homes to the local gentry.

The village developed along Town Street, a school, chapel and church were built in the 19th century but after the land was acquired by Leeds Council in 1920 a large council housing estate was built on the flatter land to the south, completely changing the rural nature of the settlement. Early transport was provided by a tram line and the Leeds Ring Road was built to Middleton. After the colliery closed the area began to decline and by 2001, had areas of multiple deprivation and high levels of unemployment and anti-social behaviour. The Middleton Regeneration Board has been established with the remit of addressing these issues.

== History ==
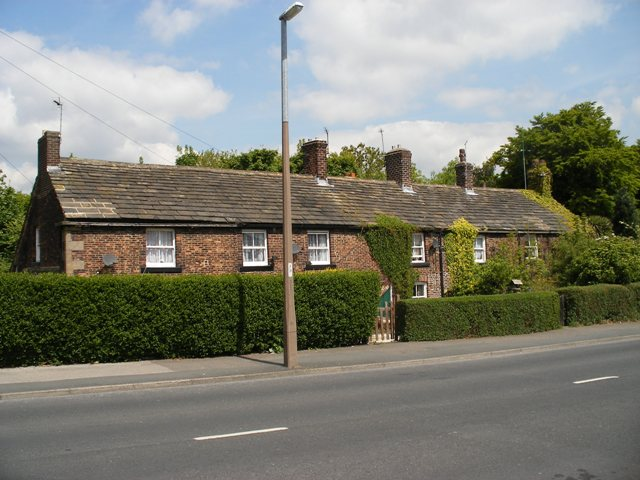
Rustic, brick-built cottages in Town Street known as Top of the town were built for the Brandlings' workers.

The name Middleton is derived from the Old English middel-tun, in this case the middle settlement or farm on the road from Morley to Rothwell.

Flint and bronze weapons have been discovered in the neighbourhood showing evidence of habitation during the Palaeolithic and Bronze Ages. Roman discoveries were made in 1607 and 1823. Middleton was mentioned as Mildentone and Mildetone in the Domesday Book as having three carucates of land much of which was woodland. The land was given to Ilbert de Lacy who had a castle at Pontefract. Middleton Park is a remnant of the manorial estate which existed after the Norman Conquest. In the 13th century the boundary between Middleton and Beeston became the focus of a protracted dispute over where it lay in the dense woodland which covered the area. The dispute between William Grammary and Adam de Beeston was settled in 1209 by single combat and resulted in the construction of a boundary bank and ditch, a stretch of which can still be seen in Middleton Woods.

The Creppings were lords of the manor followed by the Leigh or Legh family. John of Gaunt, 1st Duke of Lancaster, held the manor from 1363 to 1370 and Simon Simeon, whose will mentioned coal mines, from 1401 to 1406. The Leighs held the manor for much of the time between 1300 until 1697 when Anne Leigh married Ralph Brandling of Felling in Durham. The Leighs once occupied New Hall whose name is recalled in the street names in the area. William Gascoigne, who invented the micrometer and died fighting for the Royalists at Marston Moor in 1644, was another resident of New Hall.

Middleton Hall on Town Street was built in the 18th century for the Brandlings but they chose to live mainly in Durham. Charles John Brandling of Gosforth House, the Member of Parliament for Newcastle between 1798 and 1812 and for Northumberland from 1820 until 1826, married Henrietta Armitage of Middleton. The Brandlings appointed John Blenkinsop to manage their collieries in Middleton and he was the hall's occupant in 1809. The hall was destroyed in a fire in 1962. The gate-house serving Middleton Hall still stands today on Town Street, alongside St. Mary's Church and graveyard and original public pathway into the then private, Middleton Park.

In 1760 the Brandlings built a new residence, Middleton Lodge, designed by James Paine. It was situated in what is now the park possibly on the site the original manor house. Members of the family lived there until 1860 including R.H. Brandling who donated land on Town Street on which the church is built. The Brandling's fortunes declined and the estate was sold to the Middleton Estate & Colliery Company in 1862. William Henry Maude, a partner in the company, occupied the house with his sister in 1871. He died in a carriage accident in the park in 1911. His sister remained at Middleton Lodge after the land had been acquired by the council until her death in 1933 after which the house became the headquarters of Middleton Golf Club. Middleton Lodge was demolished in 1996.

=== Industrial history ===
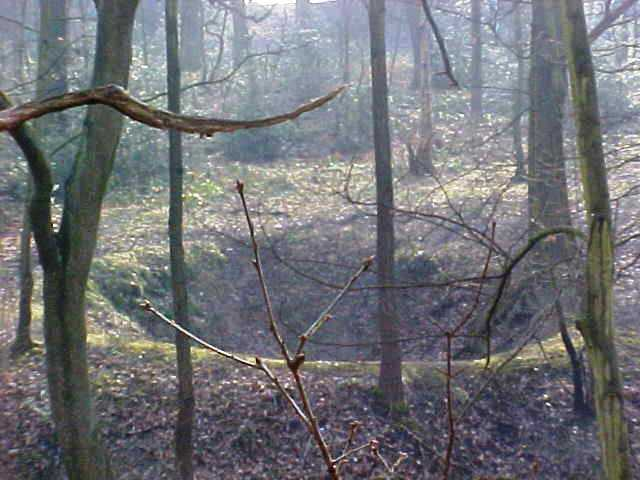
Depression or bell pit, evidence of early coal mining in Middleton Woods

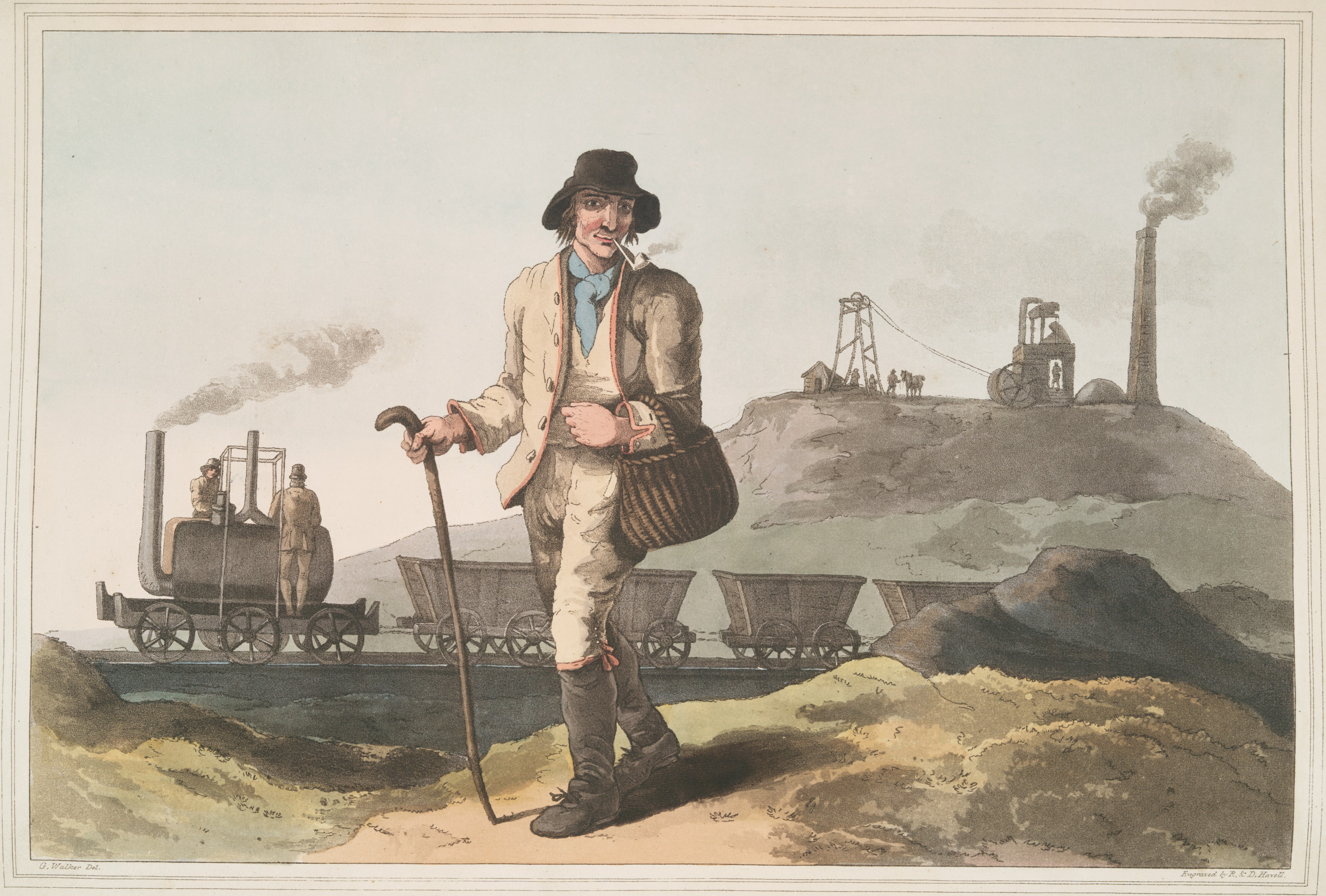
"The collier" at Middleton Colliery, in The Costume of Yorkshire by George Walker, 1814

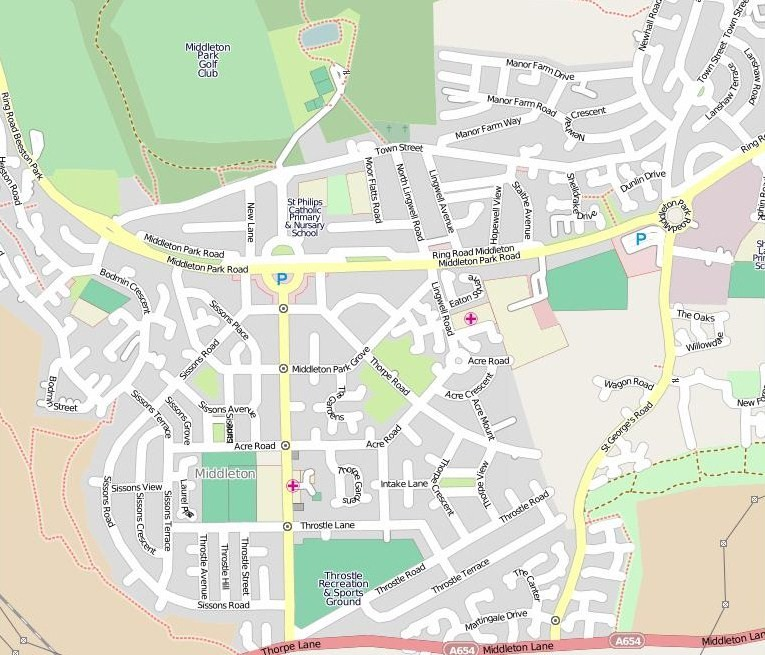
Middleton street map

There is evidence of coal mining in the Middle Ages in the shaft mounds, waggonways and similar archaeological features resulting from early mining activity in Middleton Woods. Before the 17th century the pits were bell pits and adits or day holes dug horizontally into the hill sides where the coal seam outcropped. In 1669 Frances Conyers of New Hall had "cole pits" in Middleton. The pits were small and numerous and many worked for a short time. Gin pits using horses to turn the windlass were the next development and the deeper pits had brick-lined shafts and wooden headgear for hauling tubs of coal and miners out of the workings. This type of mine was in operation when Anne Leigh married Ralph Brandling whose family owned collieries in Durham. Brandling's 1,200 acre Middleton estate supplied coal to Leeds but was disadvantaged in the trade by poor roads. Deep mining arrived with the advent of steam engines to pump water out of the mines and keep the workings dry making it possible to raise coal from greater depths. In 1780 a Newcomen engine was installed at Middleton and by 1808 the mine employed 90 hewers and 60 putters. (Note: Hewers were men who cut the coal and putters were boys or youths who filled coal tubs and pulled them to either the pit shaft or a place where pit ponies could take over.) The market for coal grew as Leeds and its industries expanded.

The Middleton Railway, founded in 1758, is the oldest continuously working railway in Britain to be established by an act of Parliament; the first such act in England. The railway, owned by Charles Brandling, (1733–1802) was a horse drawn wooden waggonway linking the collieries at Middleton to Cassons Close near Leeds Bridge in the centre of Leeds. In 1810 John Blenkinsop, Brandling's agent at Middleton, was looking for cheaper ways of moving coal to Leeds. He designed the rack railway and Matthew Murray built the first Middleton Railway locomotive, "Salamanca", at his Round Foundry in Holbeck. The locomotive's first run, reported in The Leeds Mercury on 27 June 1812, was "witnessed by thousands of spectators and crowned a complete success....". Three more locomotives were built. The Middleton Railway locomotives had a toothed cog wheel which meshed into a rack on the side of the rail, as it was felt this would provide the engines with a better grip when hauling coal wagons.

Before 1840, women and children were employed in coal mines and there were frequent accidents. The worst disaster occurred in 1825 at the Gosforth Pit, named after the Brandling's Durham estate, where an explosion of firedamp caused 24 deaths; the oldest a collier aged 48 and the youngest a child of seven.

Broom Pit was the deepest at 810 feet (250 m), and longest-lasting of the Middleton collieries. In 1896 the Middleton Broom, Little and Middleton Main Pits, all managed by John Neal, employed over 600 workers. By 1923 just the Broom Pit was working, employing more than 1,000 men and supplying coking, gas and household coal and fireclay to the brickworks. Nearly 900 men were employed there in 1940. At the time the collieries were nationalised in 1947, the workforce had reduced to 436. Operations at the pit ended in 1968 as the productivity of the colliery declined.

=== 20th century ===
In 1919, the grounds of Middleton Lodge were leased by Leeds Council for use as a public park. The rural nature of the area changed soon after 1 April 1920 when the township was incorporated into the County Borough of Leeds. Leeds Council acquired land to construct "a vast low-density corporation built cottage estate with circuses and avenues". The houses were built using bricks from the fireclay works at Broom Pit on land once used for agriculture including West Farm and parts of Sissons Farm. By 1934, 2,377 council houses had been built and the housing estate was considered to be a "garden suburb", but was found to be remote and lacking in facilities by the residents. An early resident was Keith Waterhouse, who wrote about his childhood exploits as the only member of the Middleton Hiking Club, in his book, City Lights.

The area attracted more social housing when the Westwoods and Manor Farm estates were developed in the 1960s. A large private housing estate was built at Sharp Lane after 1972 and 1,300 houses were built at Leeds New Forest Village after 2005.

== Governance ==
Middleton was a township and chapelry dependent on Holy Trinity Church in the ancient parish of Rothwell in the wapentake of Agbrigg and Morley in the West Riding of Yorkshire. It became an ecclesiastical parish after 1849. In 1866 Middleton became a separate civil parish. Middleton was part of the Great Preston Gilbert Union from 1809 until 1862, which provided a workhouse and poor relief for the parishes within its jurisdiction. The Gilbert Unions were exempt from the Poor Law Amendment Act 1834 but disbanded in 1862 and after that Middleton became part of the Kirkstall Poor Law Union until 1869, when it joined the Hunslet Poor Law Union until 1920. On 1 April 1920 the parish was abolished and merged with Hunslet. In 1911 the parish had a population of 1,207.

Middleton is in the Middleton Park electoral ward and is represented on Leeds City Council by three councillors representing the revival Social Democratic Party (SDP), who have held seats in Middleton since 2022. Before then Middleton had only had Labour Party councillors. Since the 2024 general election Middleton Park ward has been in the Leeds South parliamentary constituency. The seat is held by Hilary Benn of the Labour Party.

== Geography ==
Middleton is 4 miles (6 km) south of Leeds city centre and 165 miles (266 km) north north-west of London. It is situated on a hill and occupies most of a plateau which falls away sharply to the west (towards Dewsbury Road) and in the park to the north of Town Street from where there are extensive views towards the city centre. A height 140 metres (459 ft) AOD is reached at the western end of Town Street and within the park are two steep-sided valleys with small streams separated by a tongue of land, which meet at 60 metres (197 ft) AOD, its lowest point. The underlying geology is the coal measures and a bed of fireclay. Several coal seams outcrop in Middleton Park and between them are sandstones and shales.

The township covered about 1700 acres, of which 450 are woodland known as Middleton Woods and contain the largest area of ancient woodland remaining in Leeds. The old village was a ribbon development along Town Street which runs west–east along a ridge and Middleton housing estate occupies flattish land to the south. The high point of Middleton is by the water tower at the western end of Town Street. Middleton is in an area surrounded by three motorways, the M62 motorway to the south, the M1 to the east and the M621 to the north.

== Demography ==
In 2010, the Middleton Park ward which includes Belle Isle, had 27,487 inhabitants of which 52.2% were female and 47.8% male. 21.5% of the residents were aged 15 or under compared with an England average of 18.7%. Life expectancy for males and females at 76.57 years is more than three years less than the 79.91 years for the rest of Leeds. In 2001, most residents, 96.3%, identified as white British with 71.6% identifying as Christian and over 18% having no religion. Most houses are in the lowest-rated Council Tax bands A and B. In April 2012, 1493 people were claiming Jobseekers Allowance which at 8.3% was nearly double the Leeds' average. Middleton Park ward contained 10,649 households in 2001. There were 1,201 households with dependent children and no adult in employment. Of the 1,410 of lone-parent households with dependent children, most were women (1,307) and most had no job. Male lone-parents numbered 95 of which 39 were in full-time employment. Nearly half the households, 5,170, had no car or van.

While all recorded crime was below the Leeds' average, criminal damage was substantially higher and nearly twice the England average. Most crimes committed in the area are violent or sexual offences, anti-social behaviour, criminal damage or arson.

=== Population change ===
Population change in Middleton 1881–1911
| Year | 1881 | 1891 | 1901 | 1911 |
|---|---|---|---|---|
| Population | 1,134 | 1,236 | 1,268 | 1,207 |
Middleton CP/Tn Parish-level Unit

== Economy ==
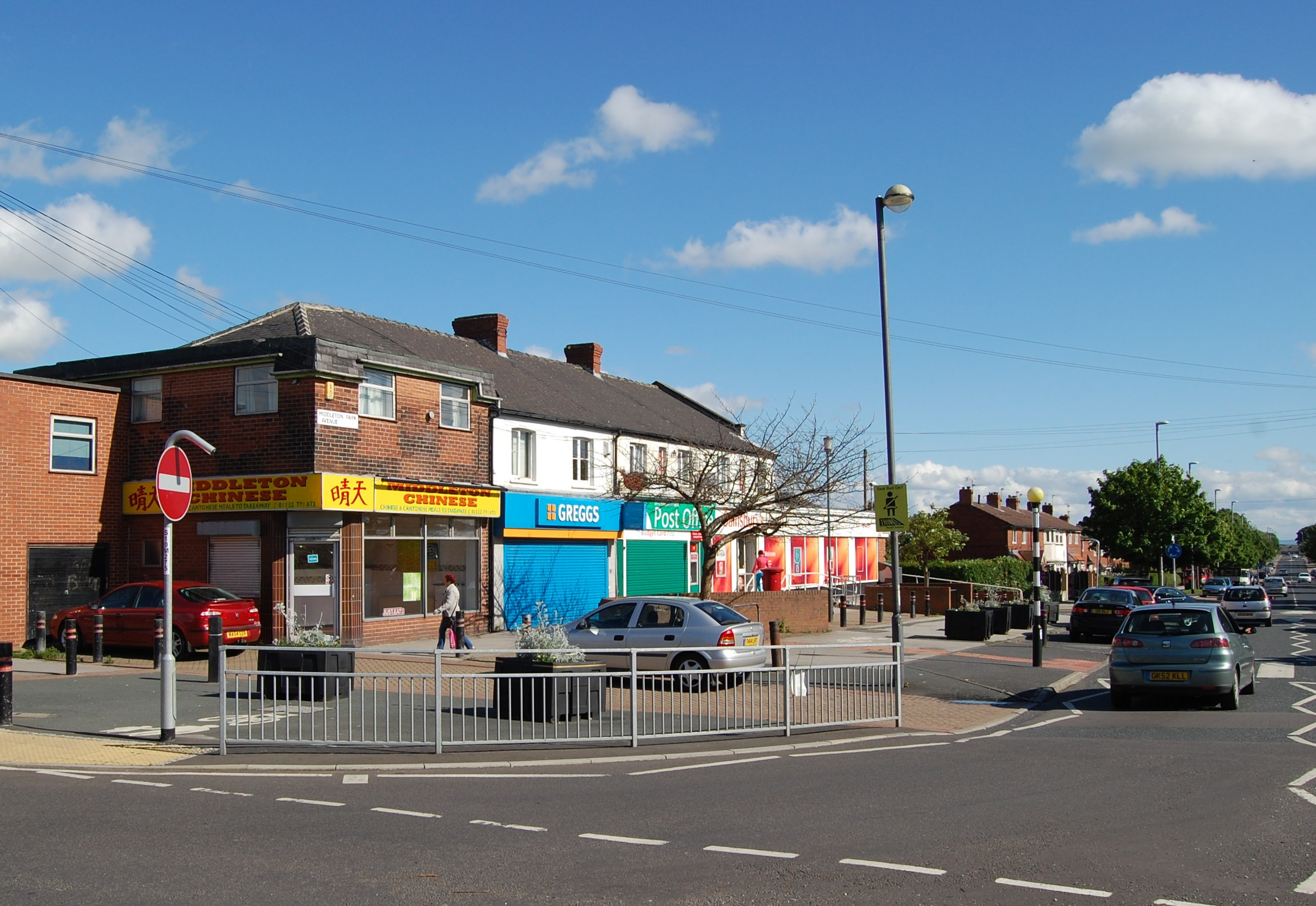
Shops at Middleton Park Circus

After the closure of the largest employer in the area, Broom Pit, in 1968, a process of decline set in. Middleton is now primarily residential with areas of multiple deprivation and as a consequence, the Middleton Regeneration Board was set up to address concerns including reducing unemployment over a ten-year period.

Facilities in the area include the St Georges Centre, a multi-use building that houses health services including a minor injuries unit and drop-in centre, a library, and a neighbourhood housing office.

Middleton has two main shopping areas, at Middleton Park Circus and the Middleton District Shopping Centre. At Middleton Park Circus there is an Aldi supermarket (opened in spring 2014 on the site of the former Middleton Arms pub), a Sainsburys Local supermarket, Boots chemist, a Post Office and several independent traders. Also in spring 2014, Asda opened a supermarket next to the Middleton District Centre, expected to provide over 300 jobs. The District Centre itself has several traders but had failed to develop.

== Landmarks ==
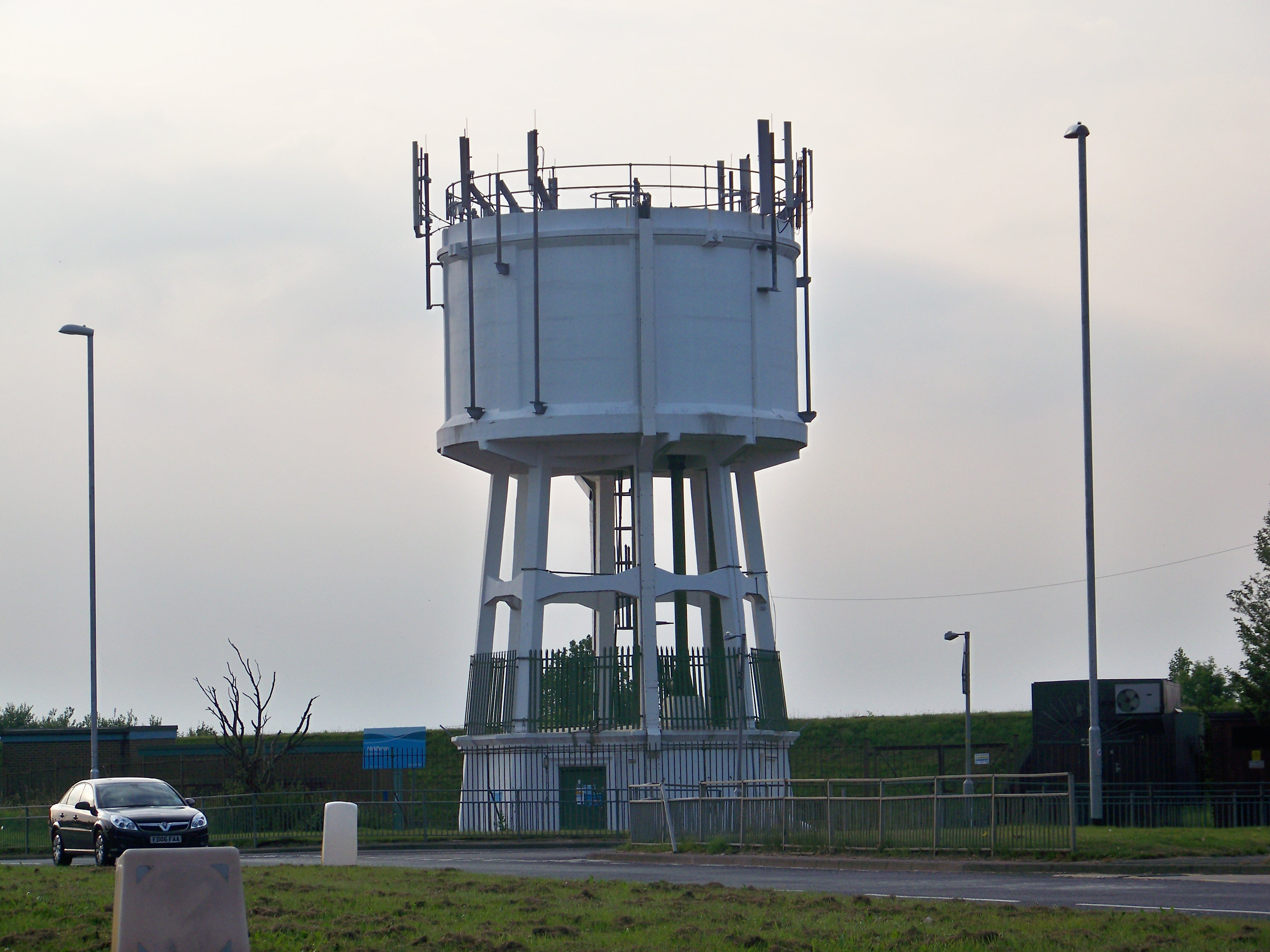
Middleton Water Tower

Middleton Park, once the private estate of the lords of the manor of Middleton, is owned by Wade's Charity and leased to Leeds City Council for a peppercorn rent. It has been one of Leeds many public parks since 1919 covering an area of nearly a square mile, 630 acres (2.5 km^{2}), of which 200 acres (0.81 km^{2}) are of ancient woodland. There is a small lake, recreational areas and a golf course. The reclaimed site of Middleton Broom Pit was incorporated into the park. Two areas of the park, comprising ancient waggonways which are now surfaced footpaths, earthworks and remains of underground workings and shaft mounds, have been designated a scheduled ancient monument.

The Middleton Railway, a preserved heritage steam railway, operates from headquarters and museum at Moor Road Hunslet to Park Halt. It is operated by volunteers. From Middleton, Park Halt is accessed by a footpath that was originally a waggonway. The railway celebrated its 200th anniversary of steam haulage in 2012.

On Town Street, a row of brick-built cottages with stone slate roofs, known as Top of the town was built in the mid 18th century. The 19th-century St Mary's Church, with its contemporary lych gate and flanking walls are all Grade II listed buildings. In the churchyard is a war memorial erected in 1920. To the west of the war memorial is a gatehouse which stood at an old entrance to the hall grounds. The distinctive white concrete water tower at the high point of the hill is at the south west corner of the park on Town Street.

== Transport ==
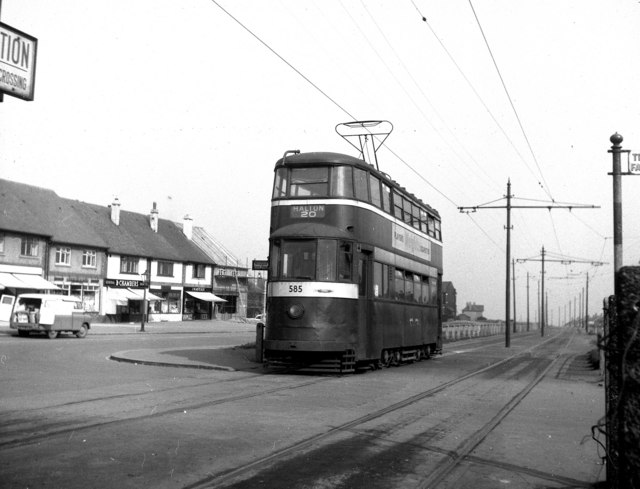
Tram on Middleton Ring Road, Lingwell Road tram stop, the terminus before the extension to Belle Isle was built in 1949.

To serve the growing population of the council estate, the Middleton Light Railway, an electric tramway, was built in 1925 by Leeds Corporation Tramways. The tramway from Leeds ran parallel to the colliery line to Hunslet Moor staithes and then headed south through Middleton Woods to a terminus on the Ring Road. As the Middleton tramway largely ran separately to the road it could run at higher speeds than other tram routes in the city; a specific fleet of trams with bogies for a smoother ride were procured for the running of the Middleton service and for most of its operation the Middleton route was not integrated with other city services. The tramway was made into a circular route in 1949 when it was extended to Belle Isle Road and Balm Road in Hunslet. The tramway closed in 1959. Its route through the park is now a footpath.

The original plans for the Leeds Supertram included a line to Middleton, but they were amended to save on costs and the later plans stipulated a terminus at Stourton. The scheme was axed when government funding was withdrawn.

Public transport in Middleton is coordinated by West Yorkshire Metro. Middleton is served by several bus routes operated by Arriva Yorkshire and First Leeds, with buses to Leeds city centre, Wakefield, Roundhay, Morley and the White Rose Centre.

== Education ==
Teachers were employed in the village in 1811 and a Sunday school, built by the Brandlings, providing education in reading and writing, was established by 1833 and used for worship before the church was built. The 1833 school was the premises of a national school in 1845. It became Middleton St Mary's C of E School and moved to a new site in 1972. There was a secondary school named "Middleton Park High School" on Acre Road in Middleton, but this was closed on 31 August 1999 despite a challenge in the High Court over the decision to close the school.

Other schools in Middleton are Middleton Primary School, in the centre of the housing estate which opened in the 1920s, St Philip's Catholic Primary and Nursery School which opened in 1941, and Westwood Primary School.

In the Middleton Park ward in 2012, at the Foundation Stage (3 to 5 years), 51.6% of children have a good level of achievement and by the end of Key Stage 2 (11 years) 69.6% of pupils achieved Level 4 or better. By the age of 16, 32.8% of pupils achieved five or more A-C grades including English and Maths in GCSEs, far less than the Leeds average of 53.4%. In secondary education, 16.5% of pupils are persistent absentees missing 15% or more sessions during the school year and 12.4% of 16- to 18-year-olds are not in employment, education or training.

== Religion ==
Middleton was a chapelry of the ancient ecclesiastical parish of Rothwell. In 1497 a chantry chapel was endowed by Gilbert Leygh and dedicated to St Mary the Virgin, it was closed at the time of the Reformation though the building is extant and now a private residence.

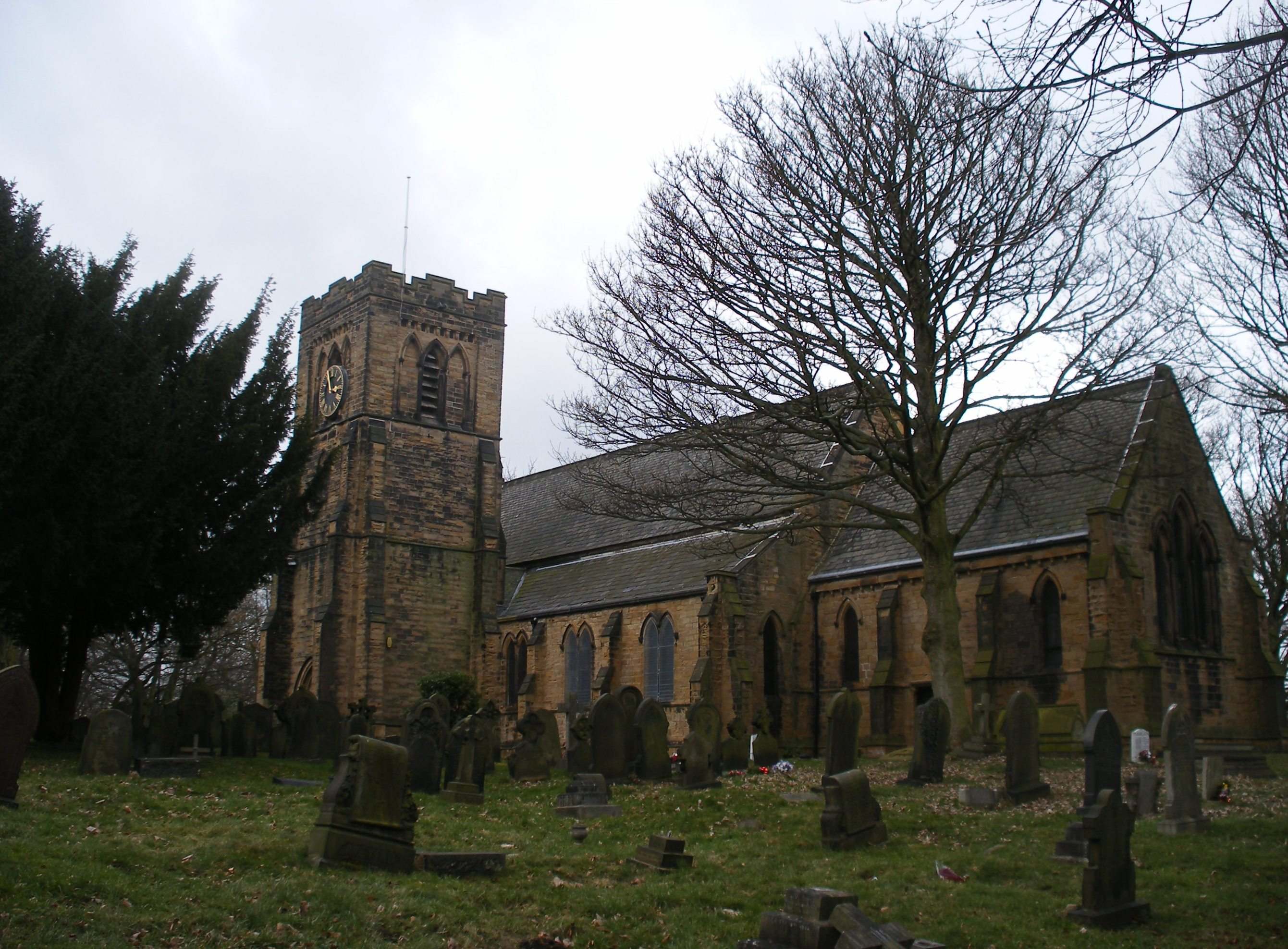
Middleton St Mary's Church built in 1847.

R.H. Brandling of Middleton Lodge gave land on Town Street on which to build a church and parsonage in 1845. St Mary's Church was built in 1846 to designs by R. D. Chantrell, who also designed Leeds Parish Church. The church and its lych gate are designated Grade II listed buildings. The church originally had a tall spire which was taken down because of mining subsidence in 1939. There is a tradition that local miners gave either a week's wages or a week's work towards the cost of its construction.

Out of the parish, two more parishes were created as the population increased after the Middleton council estate was built. In 1921 the church acquired a site on the Middleton housing estate on which to build. In 1925 a mission church was built off Middleton Park Avenue. The Church of St Cross was built in 1933 and became a parish church in 1935 with about two thirds of the Middleton housing estate in its boundaries. In the 1930s the Belle Isle housing estate was begun. The Church of St John and St Barnabus was built in Belle Isle in 1939 but not consecrated until 1947 because of World War II. This church became a parish church.

Local Methodists reputedly met in a house on Town Street until a chapel was built in the 1860s. Middleton Methodist Chapel was built in 1896 replacing a chapel built 30 years earlier by the Wesleyans. It was designed by Howdill and Howdill and built in brick. It has a tower to the north west and large west window. The interior survives largely unaltered and has a barrel-vaulted ceiling. There is a Baptist church on Middleton Park Avenue. St Philip's Roman Catholic Church, a modern building, is situated on St Philip's Avenue.

== Sport ==
A municipal golf club opened in 1933 at Middleton Lodge with an 18-hole course in the park. Middleton Leisure Centre offers a range of sporting and fitness activities.

Middleton Park FC offers football coaching and has community teams for all age groups, from 18 months old to adults. Rugby Union is played by Leeds Corinthians, who have a ground and clubhouse by the Middleton District Centre. Crown Green Bowling is represented by two clubs, one in Middleton Park with two greens and the other in Acre Close was originally the Middleton Tenants Bowling Club that changed its name to the Community Bowling Club when the old Tenants Hall was demolished in 2010 and a new one built.

== Notable people ==
- Mandip Gill (born 1988), actress (Doctor Who, Hollyoaks)

== See also ==
- Listed buildings in Leeds (Middleton Park Ward)
