= Salamanca (locomotive) =

British steam locomotive (built 1812)

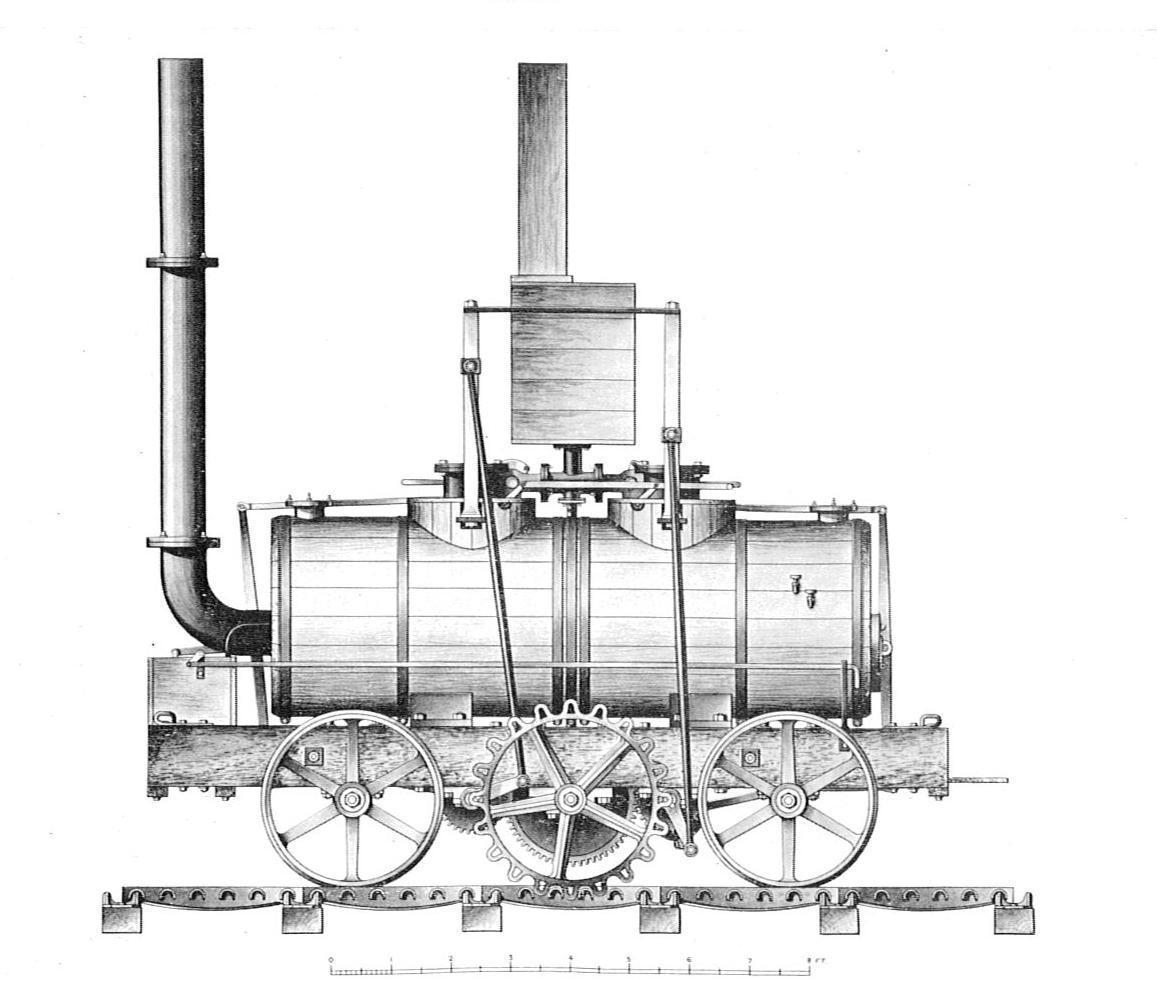
Type and origin
- Power type: Steam
- Builder: Fenton, Murray and Wood
- Build date: 1812; 214 years ago
Specifications
- Configuration
  - Whyte: Four unpowered wheels
  - UIC: 2
- Gauge: 4 ft 1 in (1,245 mm)
- Loco weight: 5 tons
Career
- Operators: Middleton Railway

Salamanca was the first commercially successful steam locomotive, built in 1812 by Matthew Murray of Holbeck, for the edge-railed Middleton Railway between Middleton and Leeds, England and it predated Stephenson's Rocket by 17 years. It was the first to have two cylinders. It was named after the Duke of Wellington's victory at the Battle of Salamanca which was fought that same year.

Salamanca was also the first rack and pinion locomotive, using John Blenkinsop's patented design for rack propulsion. A single rack ran outside the narrow gauge tracks and was engaged by a large cog wheel on the left side of the locomotive. The cog wheel was driven by twin cylinders embedded into the top of the centre-flue boiler. The class was described as having two 8"×20" cylinders, driving the wheels through cranks. The piston crossheads slid in guides, rather than being controlled by a parallel motion linkage like the majority of early locomotives. The engines saw up to twenty years of service.

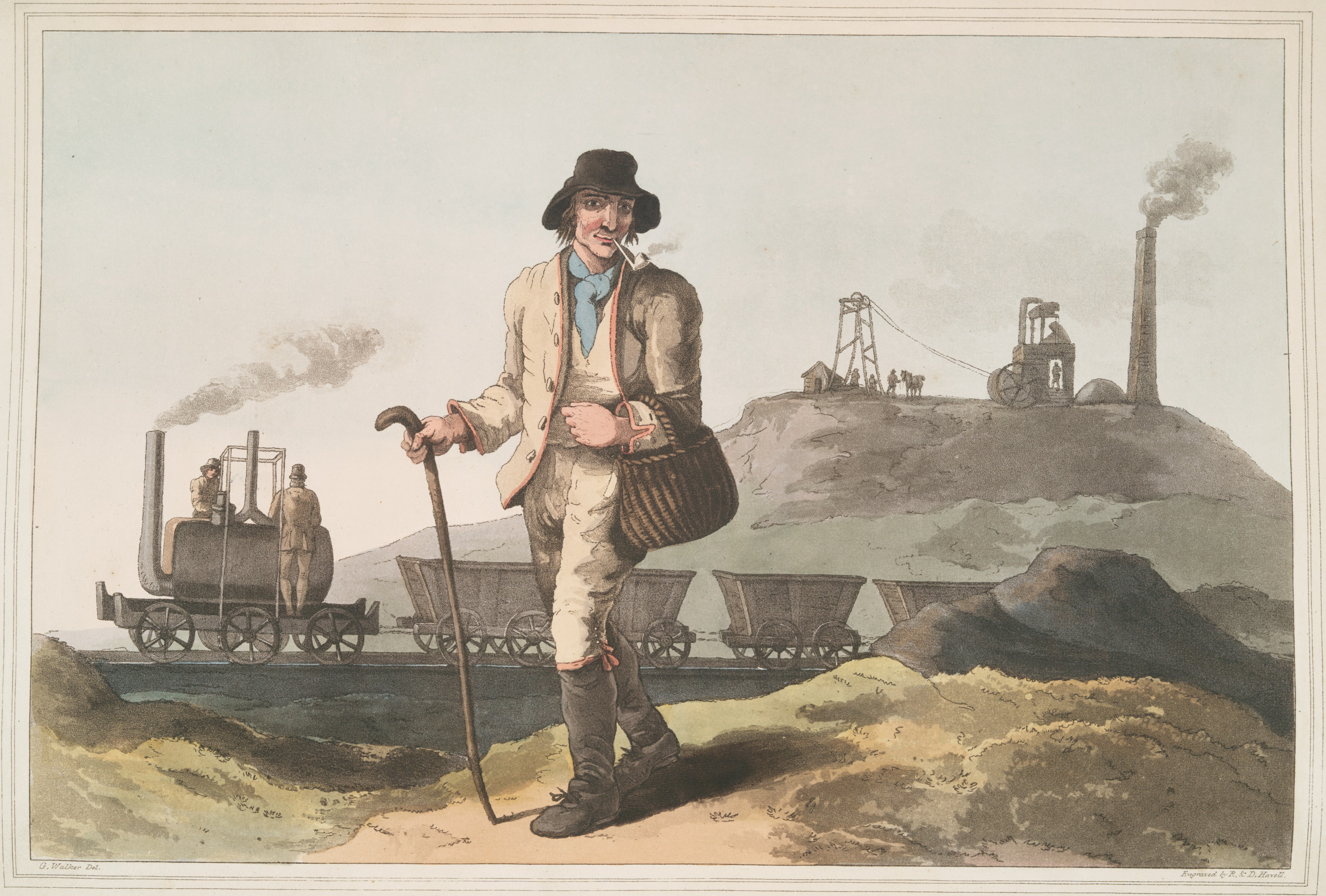
The Collier, watercolour by George Walker, 1813

It appears in the first painting of a steam locomotive, a watercolour by George Walker (1781–1856) published in his The Costume of Yorkshire. Four such locomotives were built for the railway. Salamanca was destroyed six years later, when its boiler exploded. According to George Stephenson, giving evidence to a committee of Parliament, the driver had tampered with the boiler's safety valve.

Salamanca is probably the locomotive referred to in the September 1814 edition of Annals of Philosophy: "Some time ago a steam-engine was mounted upon wheels at Leeds, and made to move along a rail road by means of a rack wheel, dragging after it a number of waggons loaded with coals." The item continues to mention a rack locomotive about a mile north of Newcastle (Blücher at Killingworth) and one without a rack wheel (probably Puffing Billy at Wylam).

A model of the locomotive, built by Murray in 1811, is part of the collection held at Leeds Industrial Museum, and is the world's oldest model locomotive.
