= Park Halt railway station =

Railway station in West Yorkshire, England

Park Halt
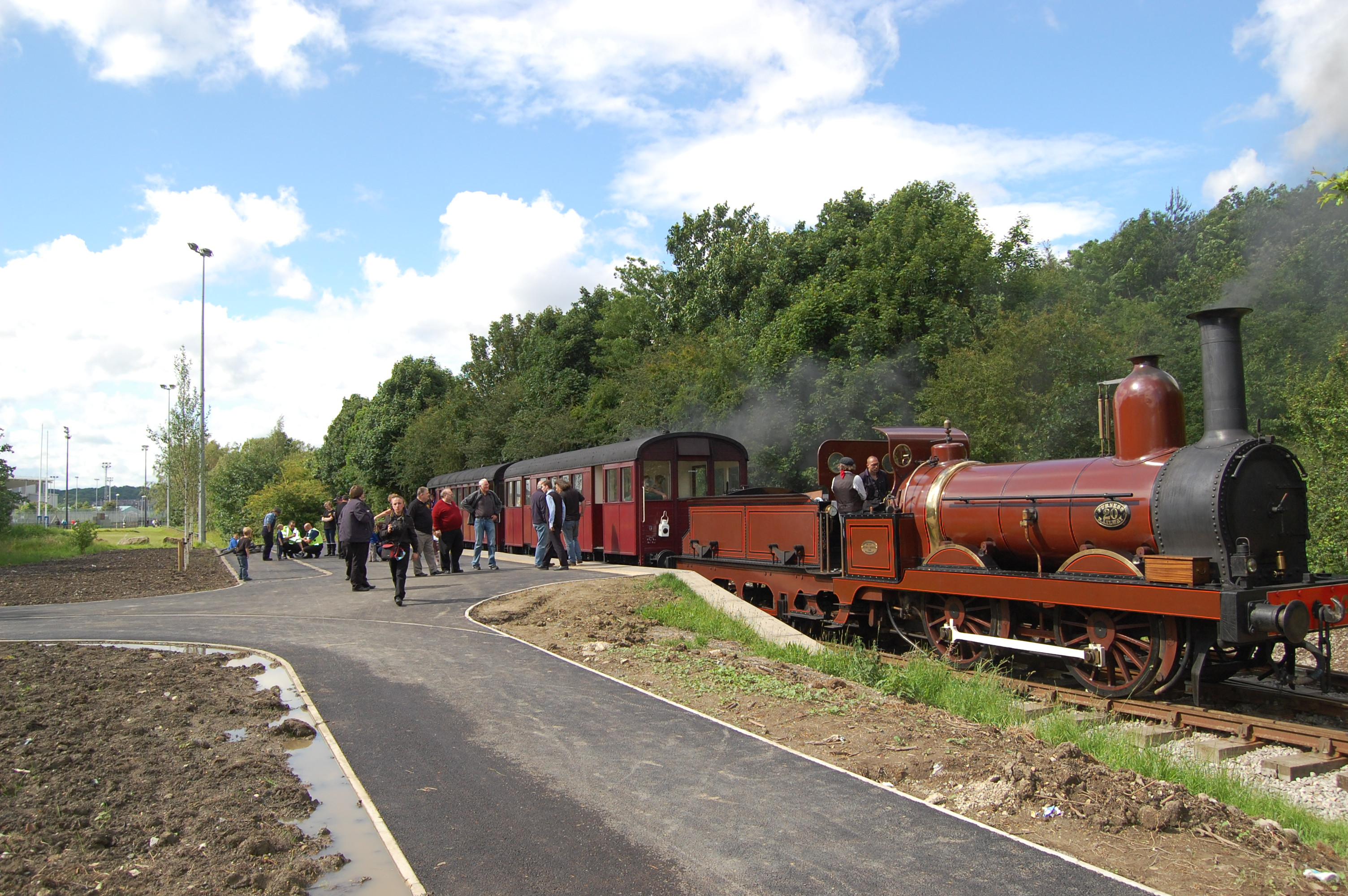
- Furness Railway locomotive no. 20 at Park Halt station

General information
- Location: Middleton, City of Leeds; England
- Coordinates: 53.7614°N 1.5364°W
- Grid reference: SE306295
- System: Station on heritage railway
- Operator: Middleton Railway
- Platforms: 1
Location

Park Halt railway station on the Middleton Railway in Leeds, West Yorkshire, England is the terminal station of the railway. It is situated next to Middleton Park. The halt was constructed so passengers could alight to walk around the reclaimed colliery site of Broom Pit and allow for the run-round of trains. Park Halt is located near the John Charles Centre for Sport. The site consists of a platform with pedestrian access into the park.

Preceding station	Heritage railways	Following station
Moor Road Terminus	Middleton Railway	Terminus
