= Middleton Park =

Park in Middleton, Leeds, England

Coordinates: 53.757°N 1.548°W

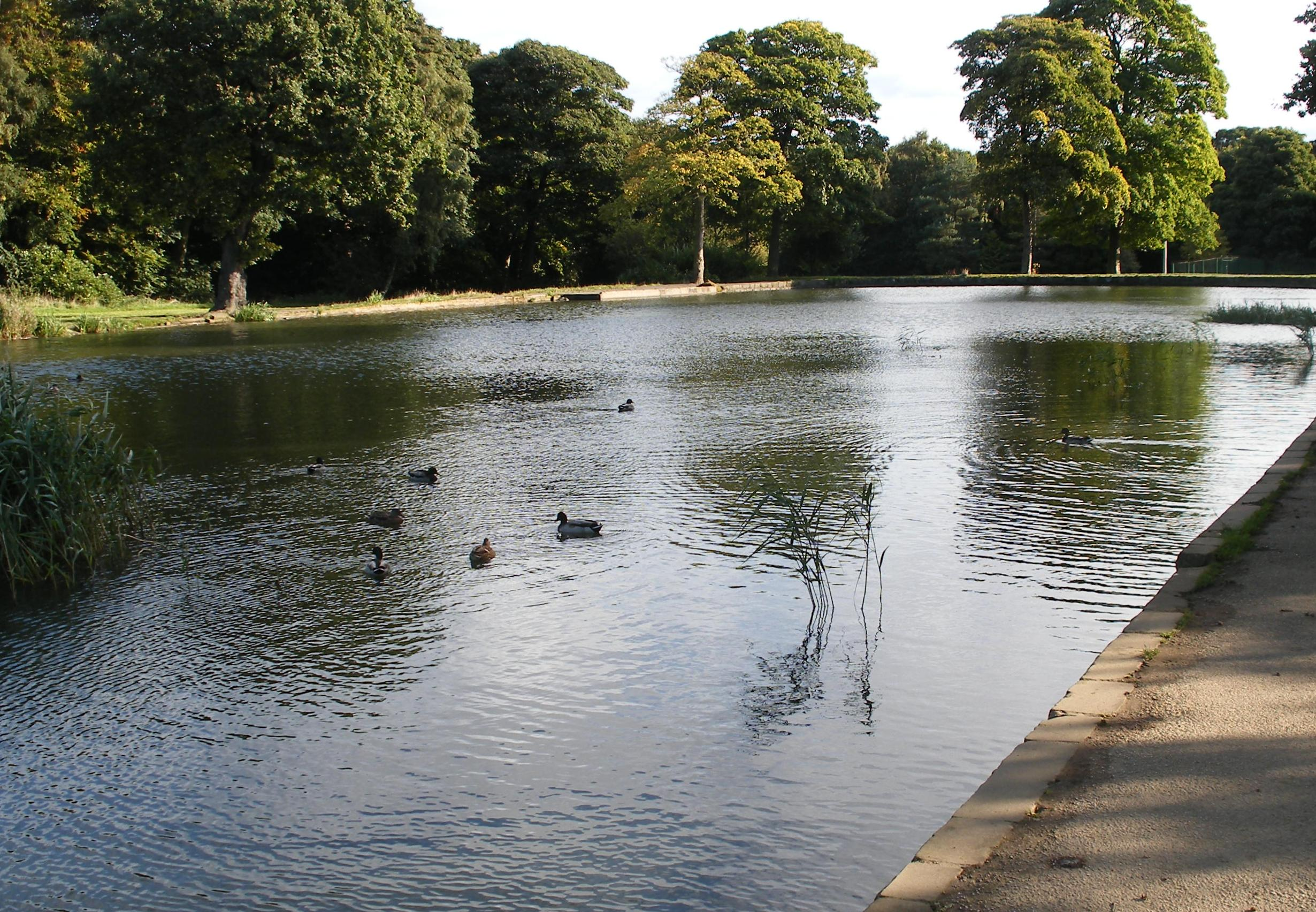
- Lake in Middleton Park
- Interactive map of Middleton Park
- Type: Parkland, woodland, lake
- Location: Middleton, West Yorkshire, England
- Area: 630 acres (2.5 km^{2})
- Created: 1920
- Operator: Leeds City Council
- Website: Middleton Park

Middleton Park is a public park in Middleton, Leeds, West Yorkshire, England. It covers an area of 630 acres (255.0 ha), nearly a square mile of which 200 acres (80.9 ha) are ancient woodland. There is also a small lake, recreational areas and a former golf course. The reclaimed site of "Middleton Broom" Colliery has been incorporated into the park. By its northern boundary is the South Leeds Stadium, home of rugby league club Hunslet. The Middleton Railway runs between Moor Road, Hunslet and Park Halt railway station. It is also the site of Leeds Urban Bike Park. It is known locally as 'Miggy Park'.

== History ==
Middleton Park is a remnant of the manorial estate which existed after the Norman Conquest. Middleton is mentioned in the Domesday Book of 1086. At the northern end of park there is an earthwork from 1204 demarcating the boundary between Middleton and Beeston. Lords of the manor included the Grammarys, Creppings, Leghs and Brandlings. The Brandlings cleared land and built Middleton Lodge in about 1760, creating a country estate. The Brandlings exploited the underlying coal and were responsible for building the Middleton Railway to transport the coal into Leeds.

Since 1919 the park has been in the ownership of Wade's Charity who lease it to Leeds City Council for a peppercorn rent. It has been one of Leeds many public parks since 1919.

== Archaeology ==
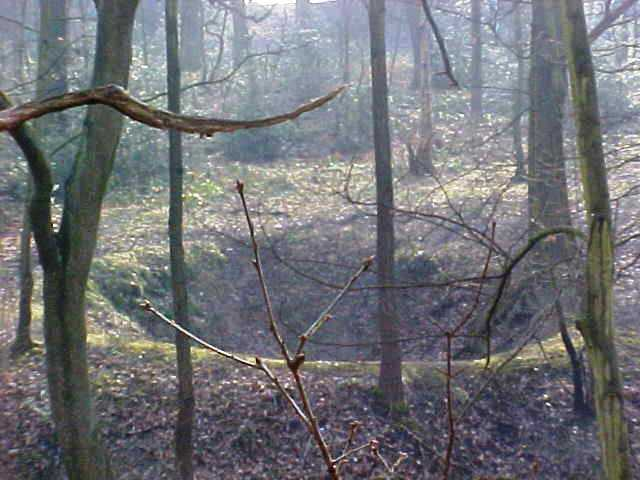
Depression, a collapsed bell pit, evidence of early coal mining in Middleton Woods

The area contains a large number of "shaft mounds" which are thought to mark sites of medieval coal mines. Survey work was done in 2007–2008 to discover more about the mounds, which seem to represent various mining techniques, including bell pits, cog and rung and whim gins. The archaeologist, Martin Roe led the team from the Friends of Middleton Park and the South Leeds Archaeology Group. Park Halt is the Middleton Railway's terminal station on the edge of the park.

== Regeneration ==
In 2008 Lottery funding was awarded to regenerate Middleton Park. A visitor centre has been constructed with a cafe and toilet facilities and a bandstand. A replica horse gin has been constructed next to the visitor centre to introduce visitors to the park's industrial heritage.

== Events ==
A program of events has been arranged in the park ranging from outdoor theatre and music to history walks, bird and wildlife watching and traditional crafts. Activities are arranged for school visits. A produce show takes place in September. An area called The Clearings is used for flying model aircraft and the lake is used by anglers. The varying terrain within the park make it popular for walking and cycling.

The area is home to Middleton Woods parkrun.
