= St Mary the Virgin's Church, Middleton =

St Mary the Virgin
- The Parish Church of St Mary the Virgin
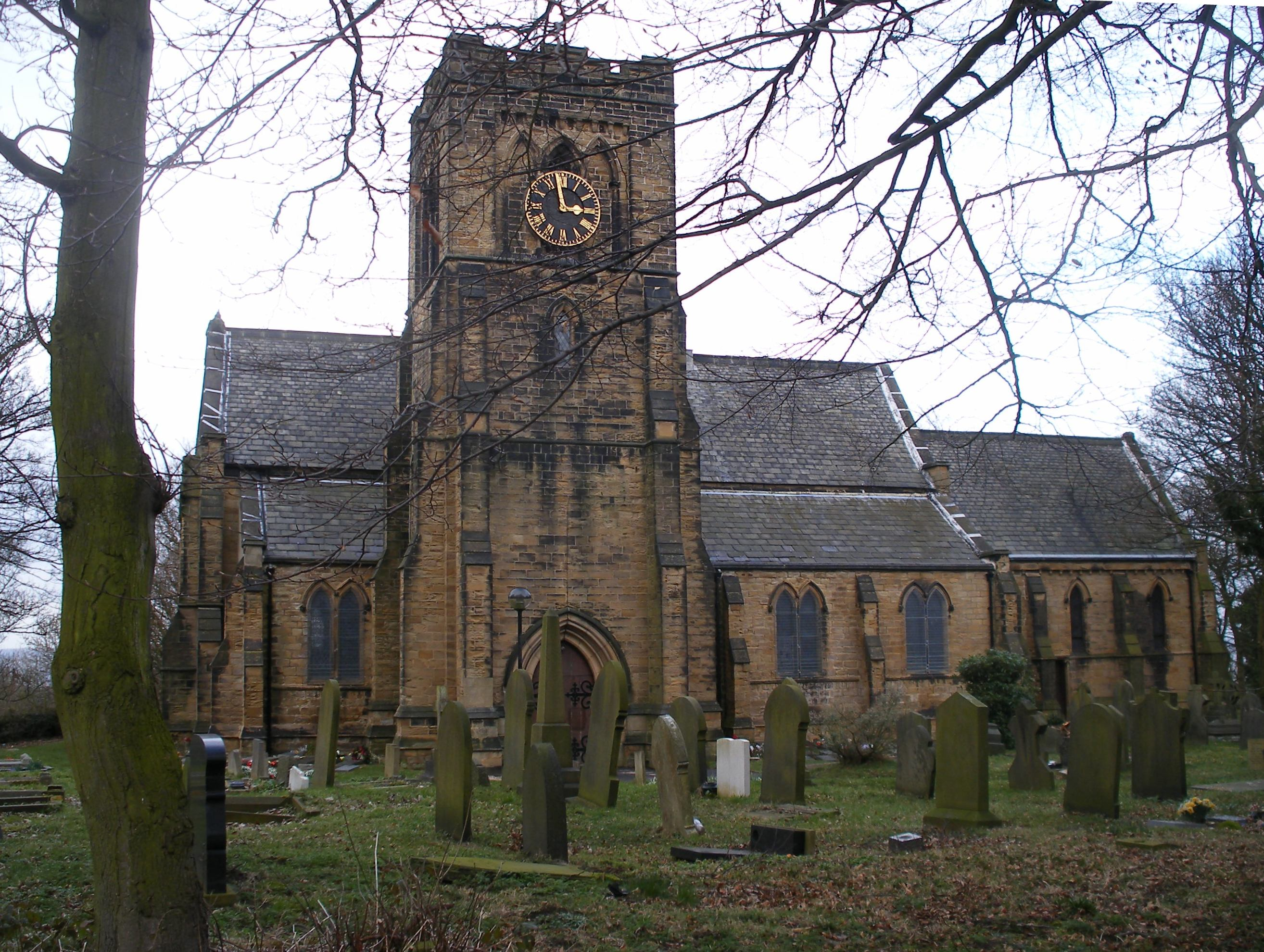
- St Mary the Virgin
- 53.7519°N 1.5433°W
- OS grid reference: SE 30216 28491
- Location: Middleton, West Yorkshire
- Country: England
- Denomination: Church of England
- Website: Parish of Middleton

History
- Status: Parish Church
- Founded: 1846
- Dedication: St Mary the Virgin
- Consecrated: 22 September 1846

Architecture
- Heritage designation: Grade II listed building
- Architect: R. D. Chantrell
- Style: Gothic Revival

Specifications
- Materials: Sandstone

Administration
- Province: York
- Diocese: Leeds
- Parish: Middleton

The Church of St Mary the Virgin in Middleton, West Yorkshire, England is an active Anglican parish church in the Armley deanery in the archdeaconry of Leeds and the Diocese of Leeds. The church and its lych gate are Grade II listed buildings.

== History ==
In 1494, a chantry chapel dedicated to St Mary the Virgin was endowed by Gilbert Leygh in Middleton It closed at the time of the Reformation. Middleton was part of the parish of Rothwell. In 1845, R. H. Brandling of Middleton Lodge gave land on Town Street on which to build a church and parsonage. The Brandlings owned the Middleton Collieries and built the Middleton Railway. The Incorporated Society for promoting the Enlargement, Building and Repairing of Churches and Chapels made a grant of £350 towards the cost of building the church, on condition that all the seats were declared free, and public subscriptions raised more than £1,000. There is a tradition that Middleton miners gave either a week's wages or a week's work towards the cost of the building. The church was built in the Early English style to designs by R. D. Chantrell, who also designed Leeds Parish Church, in 1846. The church was consecrated on 22 September 1846 by Bishop Longley of Ripon, with the sermon preached by W. F. Hook, Vicar of Leeds.

The Middleton Estate and Colliery Company was granted a licence to mine a seam of coal under the church in 1917 resulting in subsidence and damage to the tall spire which was taken down in 1939.

== Structure ==
=== Exterior ===
The church is built in coursed sandstone ashlar with slate roofs in the Early English Gothic Revival style. The aisles have two-light lancet windows between buttresses and the chancel single light lancets. There is a three-stage south west tower with an embattled parapet, angle buttresses and a porch with a Gothic arch and planked door with ornate hinges. There are three-light belfry windows; the outer windows are blocked.

=== Interior ===
The east window depicts Christ and the west window is on the theme of the evangelists. Windows in the chancel contain stained glass by William Wailes of Newcastle made between 1848 and 1852. There are two late-Victorian windows made by Barnett of Newcastle and the rest of the church is glazed in clear leaded lights. The vestry was formed in 1882 by partitioning the north west corner with solid oak screens.

The tower holds a single bell made by C & G Mears of the Whitechapel Bell Foundry in 1846 and is hung for swing chiming. The clock by Potts of Leeds dates from 1862.

== Lych gate ==
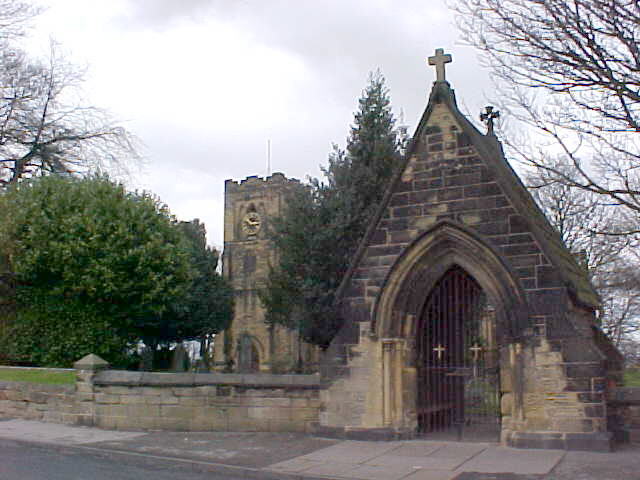
St Mary's lych gate

The lych gate, in the Gothic Revival style by R. D. Chantrell, dates from about 1846. It is built of coursed squared stone with a stone roof. It has a steeply pitched roof with stone coping to the gable ends and crosses at the apex. The flanking walls have pointed coping with shallow pyramid caps to the end piers. The walls and lych gate have Grade II listed status.

== Churchyard ==
The churchyard contains five Commonwealth service war graves from the Second World War.
