= Museum of Rail Travel =

Museum in Ingrow, England

Coordinates: 53°51′19″N 01°54′48″W

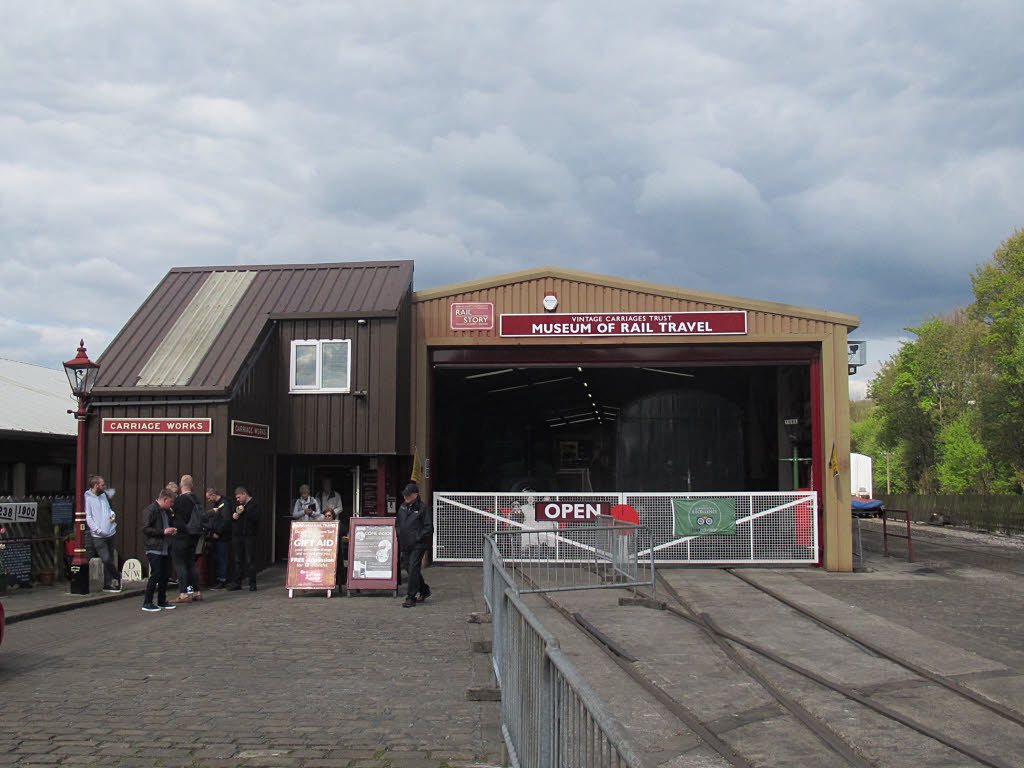
Museum of Rail Travel, Ingrow West Railway Station

The Museum of Rail Travel at Ingrow, England is operated by the Vintage Carriages Trust (VCT), a charity based just north of Ingrow (West) railway station on the Keighley and Worth Valley Railway in West Yorkshire. Founded in 1965, it became a registered charity in 1981 and opened in 1990.

The museum was re-branded as the "Carriage Works Museum" in 2023.

The Trust has provided railway carriages for over 70 films and television programmes.

Two of the steam locomotives owned by VCT – "Sir Berkeley" and "Bellerophon" have visited railways in the Netherlands. "Bellerophon" has also visited Belgium. "Sir Berkeley" is on loan to the Middleton Railway, Leeds. A third locomotive, Lord Mayor, an 0-4-0 saddle tank steam locomotive is on static display in the museum.

== The VCT Collection ==
=== Carriages ===
The Vintage Carriages Trust owns the following carriages:

- Manchester Sheffield & Lincolnshire Railway four-wheeled tri-composite no. 176, built 1876
- Midland Railway composite no. 357, built 1886
- Great Northern Railway brake third no. 589, built 1888
- Great Northern Railway brake composite no. 2856, built 1898
- Metropolitan Railway brake third no. 427, built 1910
- Metropolitan Railway third no. 465, built 1919
- Metropolitan Railway first no. 509, built 1923
- Southern Railway brake third no. 3554, built 1924
- British Railways Bulleid design third no. 1469, built 1950

=== Road vehicles ===
Until early 2008, the museum was also home to a 1948 Scammell "mechanical horse", on loan from Tate & Lyle. This lorry attracted media attention in July 2002 when the museum received a speeding ticket, from Greater Manchester Police, claiming that the three-wheel vehicle had been caught speeding at 44 miles per hour in a 30 mph zone – when in fact it has a maximum speed of only 18 mph. (It was a case of mistaken identity: a Belgian car with the same number plate has been caught on camera in Bolton). Museum bosses were pleased to be able to show CCTV footage in its defence – at the time of the incident it was in pieces in the museum's workshops.

After a lengthy restoration into LNER blue livery, the mechanical horse and a matching trailer left Ingrow for pastures new in June 2008.
