= Brandling of Newcastle =

The Brandlings of Newcastle were a wealthy family of merchants and land and coal owners in Newcastle upon Tyne and Northumberland.

== Tudor and Stuart periods ==
Sir John Brandling, who was knighted at Blackheath in 1497 and married Elizabeth Helye of Northumberland, settled in Newcastle where he served as sheriff in 1505, and as mayor in 1509, 1512, 1516 and 1520.

His son, Sir Robert Brandling (died 1568), served as sheriff of Newcastle in 1524 and also as mayor in 1536, 1543, 1547 and 1564. In 1547, whilst mayor, he was knighted by Edward Seymour, 1st Duke of Somerset, following the Battle of Pinkie Cleugh, in Scotland. He was Custos Rotulorum of Northumberland.

Another son, Henry Brandling (1515–1578), was Sheriff of Newcastle in 1566 and mayor of the city in 1568, 1575 and 1576. His brother Thomas Brandling (1512–1590) was educated at the newly established Royal Grammar School, and founded the land and coal owning dynasty.

Robert Brandling (1575–1636) sat in the House of Commons from 1621 to 1622. He was the son of William Brandling of Felling and Anne Helye daughter of George Heyle. His son by his first wife, Jane Wortley, Sir Francis Brandling (1595–1641), sat in the House of Commons from 1624 to 1625.

The Brandlings had Catholic sympathies, and during the English Civil War Robert Brandling (1617–1690) served in the King's army in the rank of Colonel. With the King's fortunes waning, he escaped to Scotland where he remained until after the Restoration. He avoided sequestration of his estate and returned to England. His brother Roger, however, was killed in battle during the war.

== Estates ==
The family acquired by marriage Alnwick Abbey and estates at Gosforth, but by 1605 their seat had been established at Felling Hall, Felling, County Durham.

The family fortunes were largely derived from the exploitation of coal reserves under their lands. Coal was worked at Felling from about 1670. The deep mine at Felling Colliery was sunk by the Brandlings in 1779. Their mines were linked to the River Tyne by wagonways.

A disaster at their Felling Colliery in 1812, when 91 people died, was largely responsible for the pressure to develop a miners' safety lamp. Ironically, Felling Hall fell victim to mining subsidence and had to be demolished.

Other estates acquired included Shotton near Peterlee, Durham, and Middleton near Leeds in West Yorkshire.

== 18th and 19th centuries ==
Charles Brandling (1733–1802) was High Sheriff of Northumberland in 1781 and was Member of Parliament for Newcastle 1784–1798. He married Elizabeth Thompson, heiress of Shotton near Peterlee, and built a new mansion house, Shotton Hall, there in about 1760. He also built a new mansion, to a design by architect Payne, at Gosforth House between 1755 and 1764, and this house became the family seat.

Charles John Brandling (1769–1826) of Gosforth was Member of Parliament for Newcastle 1798–1812 and for Northumberland 1820–1826. In 1815 he chaired the committee set up to establish the remuneration to be paid to George Stephenson for the invention of the Geordie lamp. His mining interests included Felling, Gosforth (where a deep mine was sunk in 1825), Heworth, Coxlodge, Kenton and Middleton. At Middleton he employed John Blenkinsop who in 1812 converted the wagonway from Brandling's collieries into a rack and pinion steam railway, the Middleton Railway. He overindulged in coal speculations which led to financial difficulties and the sale of many of the family's estates: Shotton in 1850, and Gosforth and Felling in 1852. Thereafter the family seat was Middleton Lodge in Yorkshire, until the 1860s.

== Bibliography ==
- Burke, John (1835). "Brandling". A Genealogical and Heraldic History of the Commoners of Great Britain and Ireland: Enjoying Territorial Processions Or High Official Rank, But Uninvested with Heritable Honours. London: Henry Colburn. pp. 39–42. "Burke's Landed Gentry"
