= Moor Road railway station =

Railway station in West Yorkshire, England

Moor Road
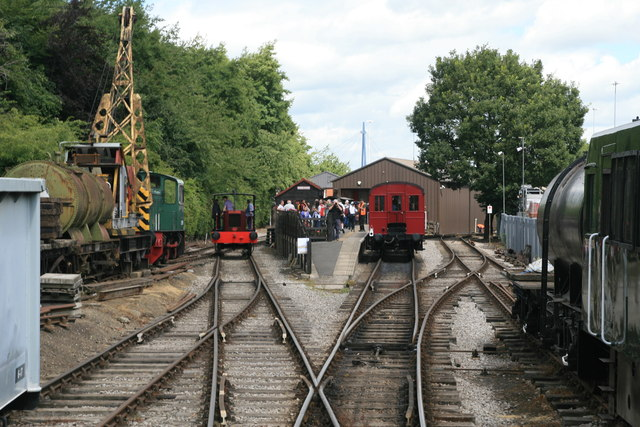

General information
- Location: Hunslet, City of Leeds; England
- Coordinates: 53.775070°N 1.538600°W
- Grid reference: SE305310
- System: Station on heritage railway
- Operator: Middleton Railway
- Platforms: 1
Location

Moor Road railway station is on the Middleton Railway in West Yorkshire, England.

== History ==
The station is the principal station on the railway. It is situated on Moor Road. The station was constructed at a new position in 2006 as a replacement for an earlier station built close by. The station adjoins the headquarters of the railway which contains an Engine House Museum, shop, toilets, workshop and conference room.

== Information ==
Moor Road is located next to the Tulip Retail Park. The site consists of:

- A station platform with a wooden shelter and a coal stage.

Preceding station	Heritage railways	Following station
Terminus	Middleton Railway	Park Halt Terminus
