= The Costume of Yorkshire =

1814 book by George Walker

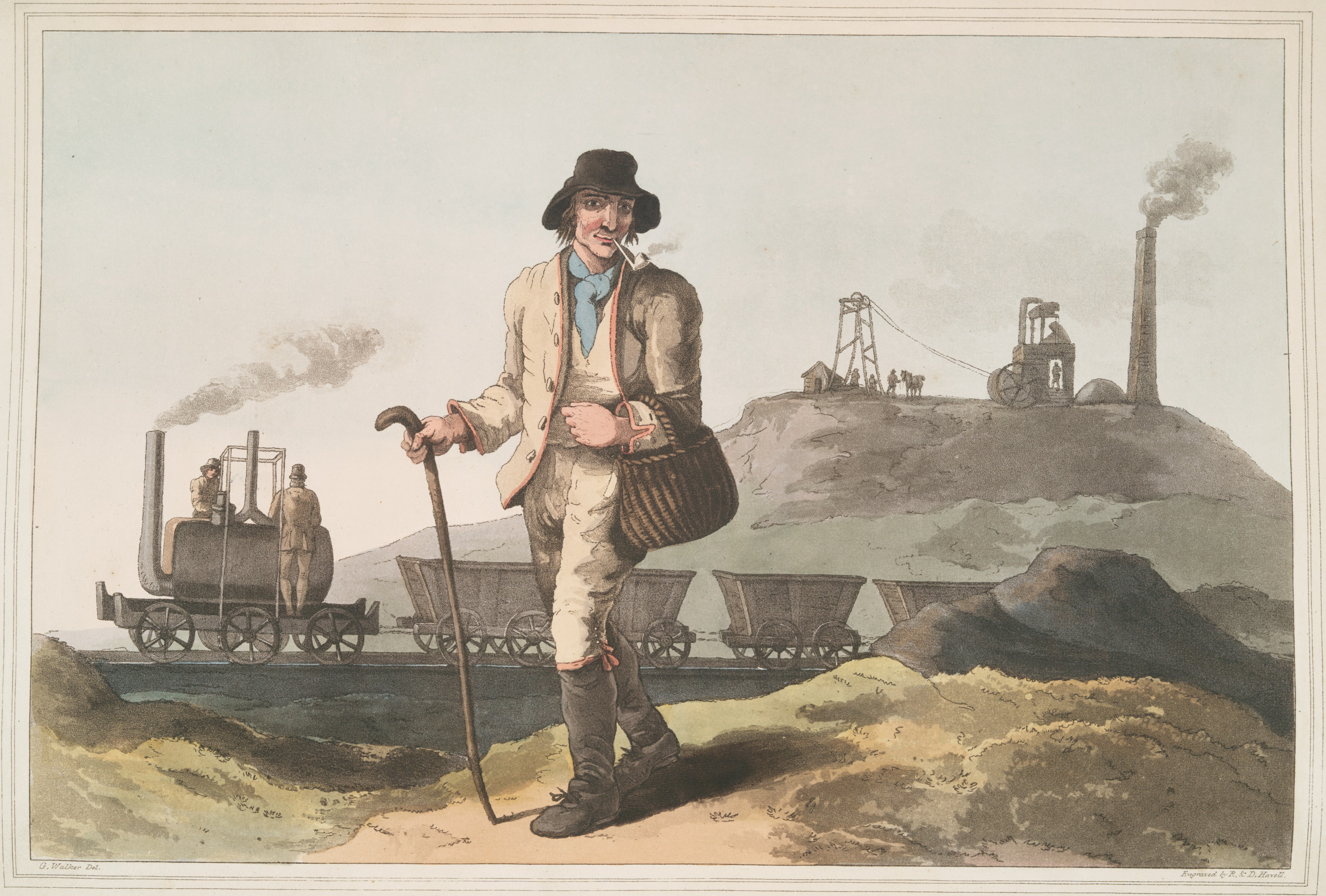
Plate 3, The collier, with Middleton colliery and John Blenkinsop's pioneering locomotive

The Costume of Yorkshire is an 1814 book by George Walker illustrating the various styles of dress worn by people of differing traditional professions in the county of Yorkshire in the 19th century.

== Author ==
George Walker was born in 1781 near Leeds, the youngest of five brothers; his father William was a drysalter and a member of the Mill Hill Chapel. George was educated in Mansfield and then at the Revd. Charles Wellbeloved's school in York. Instead of following his father's trade, he studied natural history and fine art, often making sketches of wildlife, people and landscapes. He died in 1856.

== Book ==
The book contains an unnumbered frontispiece and 40 coloured and numbered engravings, including such famous pictures as those of Yorkshire cloth-dressers, making oatcakes, a woman spinning, and a collier. The text with each plate is in both French and English, an unusual feature given that the two countries had been at war for much of the period. Walker's paintings were engraved by the Havell family, including the engravers Robert Havell (1769–1832) and his cousin Daniel Havell (1786–1822): plates 1–24 by both men, the rest, later, by Robert Havell alone. Robert's son, also called Robert, engraved John James Audubon's Birds of America. The print of the Middleton collier has been used as an image of the English working class at its inception in the Industrial Revolution.

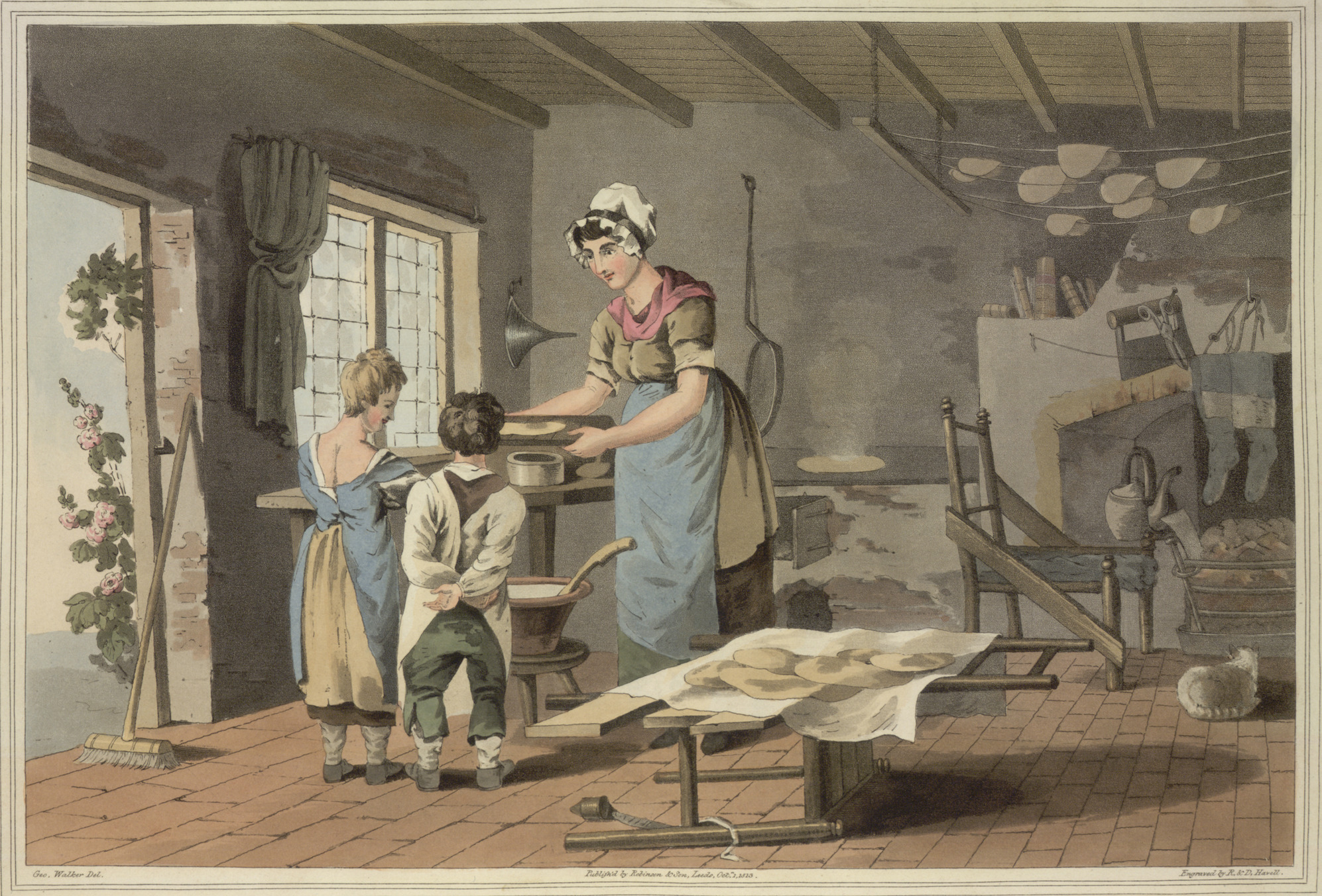
Plate 9, Making oat cakes

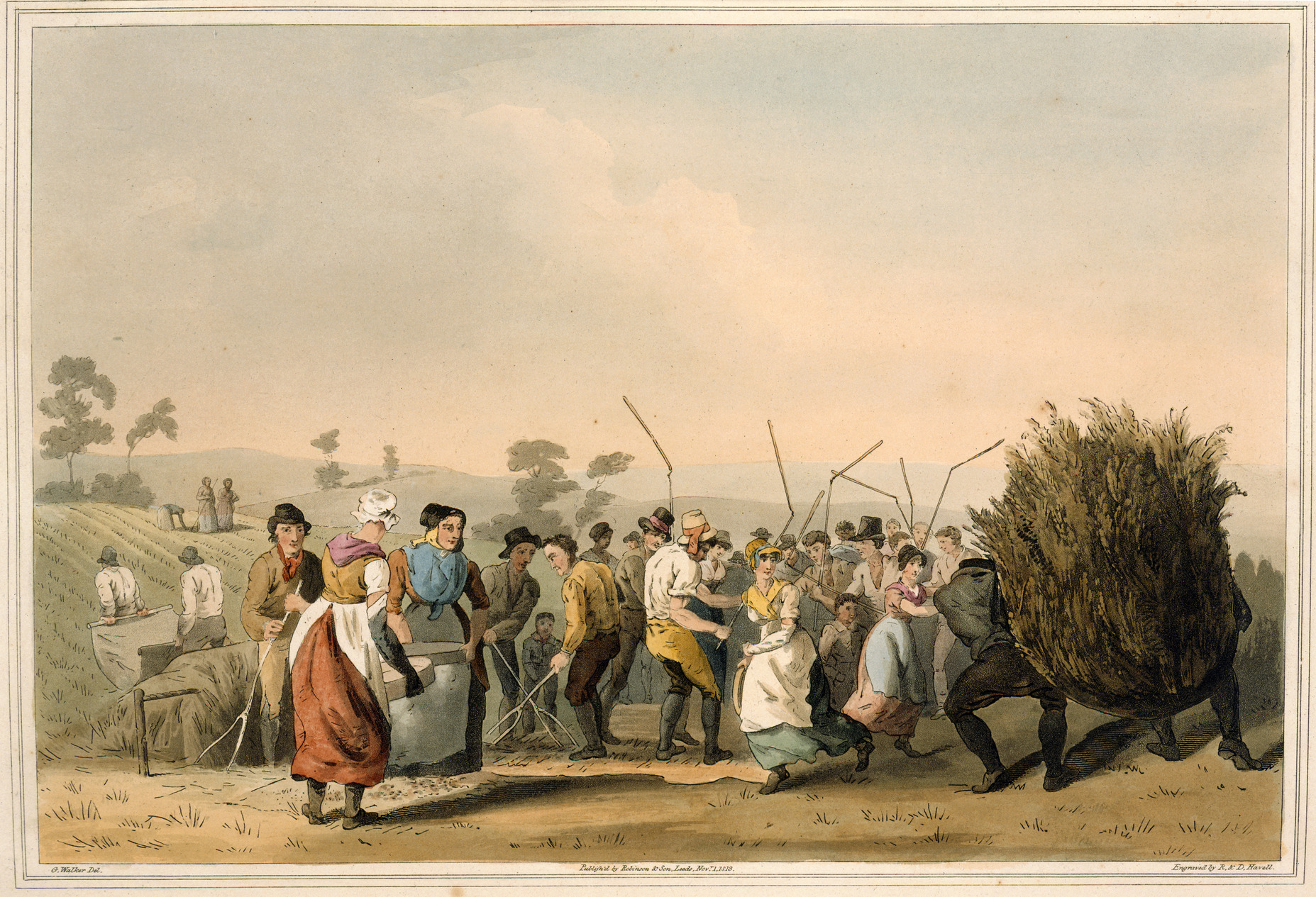
Plate 15, Rape threshing

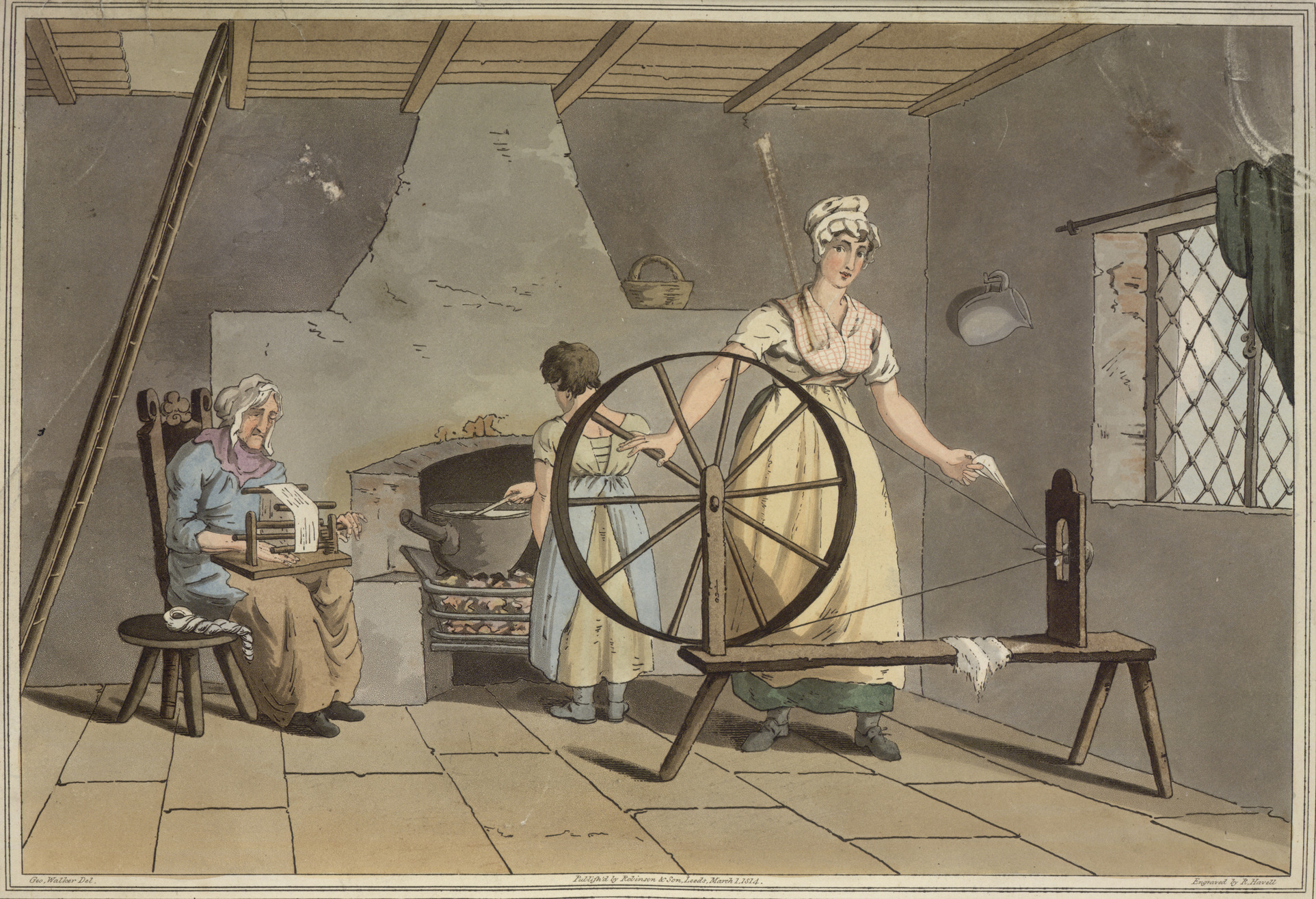
Plate 29, Spinning and carding wool

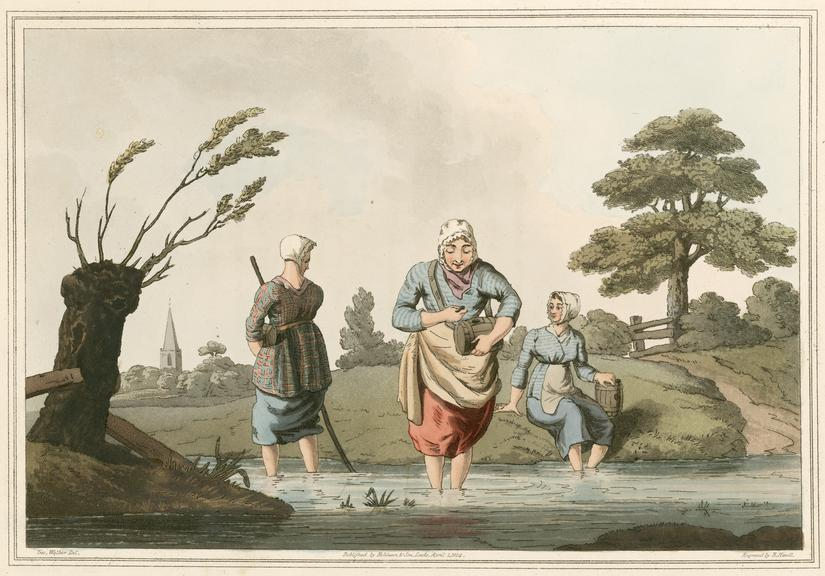
Plate 35, Leech finders
