= John Blenkinsop =

British mining engineer and an inventor of steam locomotives (1783–1831)

- Born: 1783
- Died: 22 January 1831 (aged 47)
- Occupations: Engineer, inventor
- Relatives: Thomas Barnes (cousin)

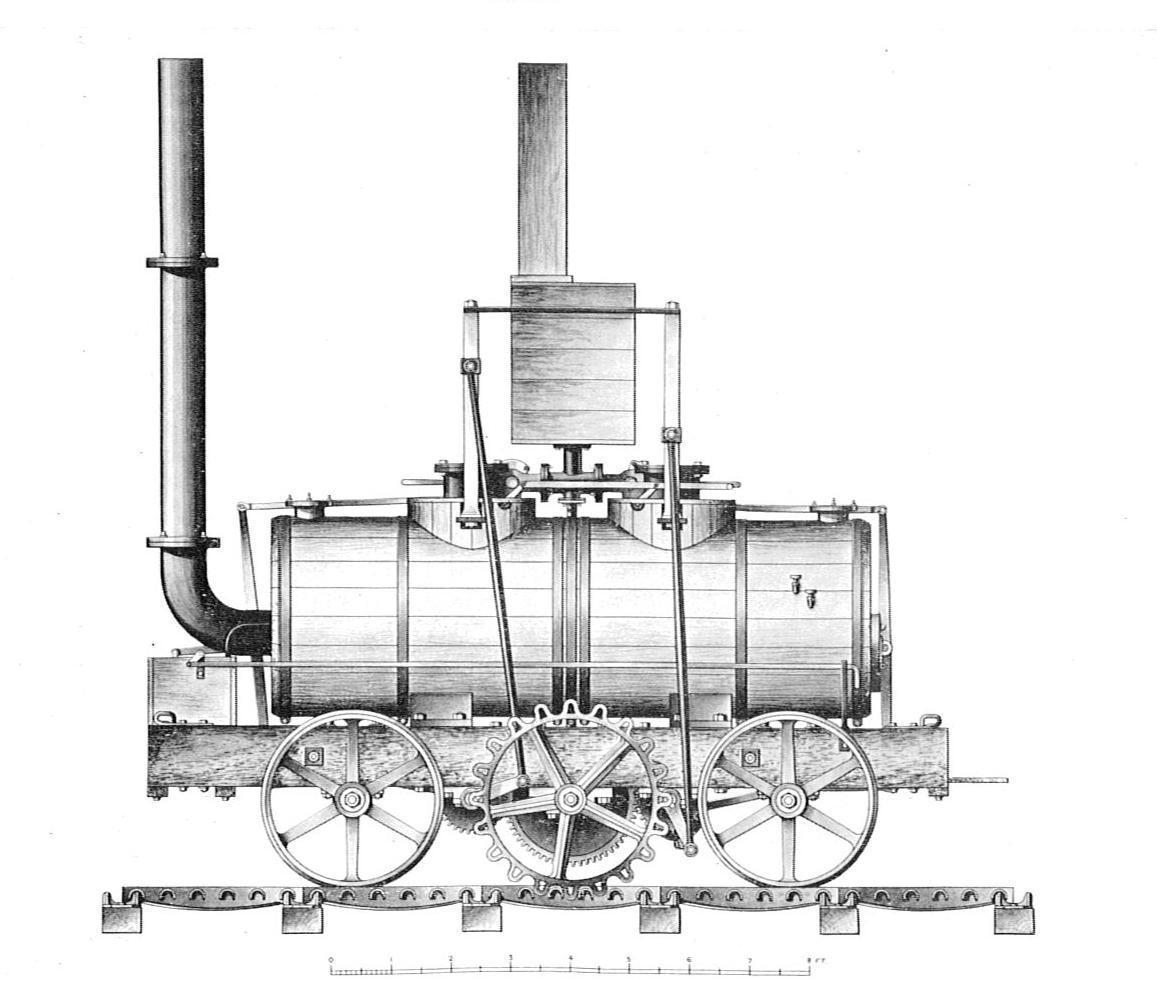
Blenkinsop's rack locomotive

John Blenkinsop (1783 – 22 January 1831) was an English mining engineer and an inventor of steam locomotives, who designed the first practical railway locomotive.

He was born in Felling, County Durham, the son of a stonemason and was apprenticed to his cousin, Thomas Barnes, a Northumberland coal viewer. From 1808 he became agent to Charles John Brandling, who owned collieries on his Middleton estate near Leeds and whose family came from Felling.

== Blenkinsop and the Middleton Railway ==
In 1758 the Brandlings had built a wooden wagonway to carry coal into Leeds, using horse-drawn vehicles, now known as the Middleton Railway. Not all the land traversed by the wagonway belonged to Brandling, and it was the first railway to be authorised by Act of Parliament, since this would give him power to obtain wayleave.

In the early nineteenth century, attempts were being made to employ steam power for haulage. Richard Trevithick had experimented with various models of steam locomotive, and in 1805 his work had culminated in an engine for the Wylam Colliery. The cast-iron plated wood rails were unable to take the engine's heavy weight, however, and the initial attempt to convert to steam locomotion at Wylam was abandoned. Work on the development of locomotive power continued nonetheless. A shortage of horses and fodder brought about by the Napoleonic Wars had made steam traction a more attractive proposition and encouraged further development. Moreover, edge rails, made entirely of iron, laid at Middleton Railway from around 1799, were stronger.

While many people, such as William Hedley, felt that adhesion should be adequate with a locomotive weighing around five tons, Blenkinsop was less sanguine. In 1811 he patented (No 3431), a rack and pinion system for a locomotive which would be designed and built by Matthew Murray of Fenton, Murray and Wood in Holbeck.

The general opinion of the time was that a locomotive would draw up to four times its weight by adhesion alone (assuming good conditions), but Blenkinsop wanted more, and his engine, weighing five tons, regularly hauled a payload of ninety tons. The first locomotive probably was Salamanca, built in early 1812. Three other locomotives followed, one later in 1812, one around 1813, and the last one in 1815. One of these three was named Lord Wellington, and the other two allegedly were named Prince Regent and Marquis Wellington, though there is no contemporary mention of those names. Similar locomotives were built for collieries at Orrell near Wigan by Robert Daglish under licence from Blenkinsop, and at least one other was built by Matthew Murray for the Kenton and Coxlodge Collieries at Newcastle-upon-Tyne. What should have been Blenkinsop's third locomotive had already been sent to the Kenton and Coxlodge Waggonway at his request. There, it seems to have acquired the name Willington.

Two locomotives of this pattern were also made by the Royal Iron Foundry in Berlin. Though they worked well when tested at the Foundry, neither could be made to work properly at their intended workplaces, and both ended their days as stationary engines. The Murray/Blenkinsop locomotives had the first double-acting cylinders and, unlike the Trevithick pattern, no flywheel. The cylinders drove a geared wheel which engaged with the rack beside one rail. One of the geared locomotives was described as having two 8"x20" cylinders, driving the wheels through cranks. The piston crossheads worked in guides, rather than being controlled by parallel motion like the majority of early locomotives. Between them, the engines saw more than twenty years of service.

The design was superseded when rolled iron rail, which could bear the heavier adhesion locomotives, was introduced in 1820. This was quickly adopted by George Stephenson and others.

Gravestone: upper inscription

Sacred
to the memory of
Mr. John Blenkinsop,
upwards of twenty three years
Steward to the Middleton Estate
who departed this life, January
22nd 1831, (Note: The gravestone may appear to be carved 1851 in this photograph. This is due to the light and the style of the 3 employed by the mason.) aged 47 years.
Sincerely regretted by all who knew him.

Gravestone: lower inscription

The centenary observed - 25th Jan. 1931.

John Blenkinsop invented the rack railway in 1811
and on a line he built between Leeds and Middleton,
4 Matthew Murray locomotives ran from 1812 to 1835.
His system was adopted at Newcastle-on-Tyne in 1813
and Wigan in 1814. These railways were the first
on which steam locomotion was a commercial success.

In addition to managing the Middleton Collieries, in the 1820s John Blenkinsop was the consulting engineer for Sir John Lister Kaye of Denby Grange, owner of Caphouse Colliery. Also, as a qualified "Viewer", he was hired by various other colliery owners to examine their collieries and report on such vital matters as the expected future production of a pit, as well as to make suggestions as to how its operation and production could be improved. Blenkinsop died in Leeds in 1831, and is buried at Rothwell Parish Church.

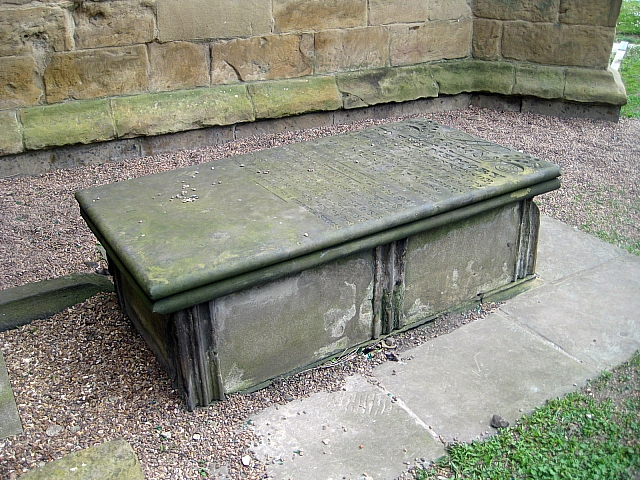
Blenkinsop's grave

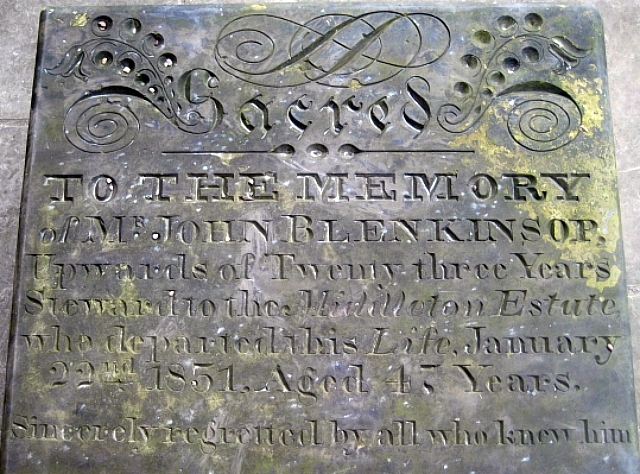
Inscription, upper

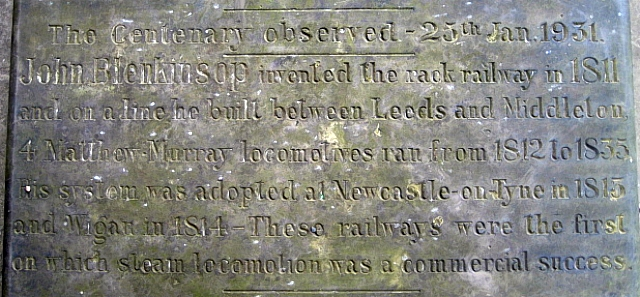
Inscription, lower

== See also ==
- Rack railway
