= Middleton Railway =

Railway line in Leeds, England

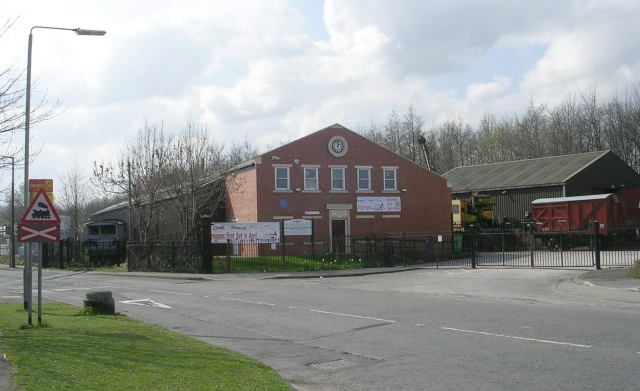
- Main station building on Moor Road.
- Locale: Hunslet, Leeds, West Yorkshire
- Terminus: Moor Road
- Coordinates: 53.775070°N 1.538600°W

Commercial operations
- Name: Middleton Railway
- Built by: Charles Brandling
- Original gauge: 4 ft 1 in (1,245 mm) until 1881; 4 ft 8 1/2 in (1,435 mm) standard gauge from 1881

Preserved operations
- Owned by: The Middleton Railway Trust Ltd.
- Operated by: The Middleton Railway Trust Ltd.
- Stations: 2
- Length: 0.96 miles (1.54 km)
- Preserved gauge: 4 ft 8 1/2 in (1,435 mm) standard gauge
- 1758: Construction of first waggonway
- 1799: Wooden tracks replaced with iron edge rails
- 1812: Introduction of steam locomotives
- c. 1835: Line reverts to horse drawn trains
- 1866: Return of steam locomotives
- 1881: Line converted to 4 ft 8 1/2 in (1,435 mm) standard gauge
- 1947: Rationalisation of the Line
- 1960: Line taken over by preservation society

Preservation history
- June 1960: One week passenger service
- 1960: Start of freight service
- 1969: Start of regular passenger service
- 1983: End of freight service
- Headquarters: Moor Road station

Website
- http://www.middletonrailway.org.uk/

The Middleton Railway is the world's oldest continuously working railway, situated in Leeds, West Yorkshire, England. It was founded in 1758 and is now a heritage railway, run by volunteers from The Middleton Railway Trust Ltd. since 1960.

The railway operates passenger services at weekends and on public holidays over approximately 1 mile (1.6 km) of track between its headquarters at Moor Road, in Hunslet, and Park Halt, on the outskirts of Middleton Park.

== Origins: Middleton colliery ==
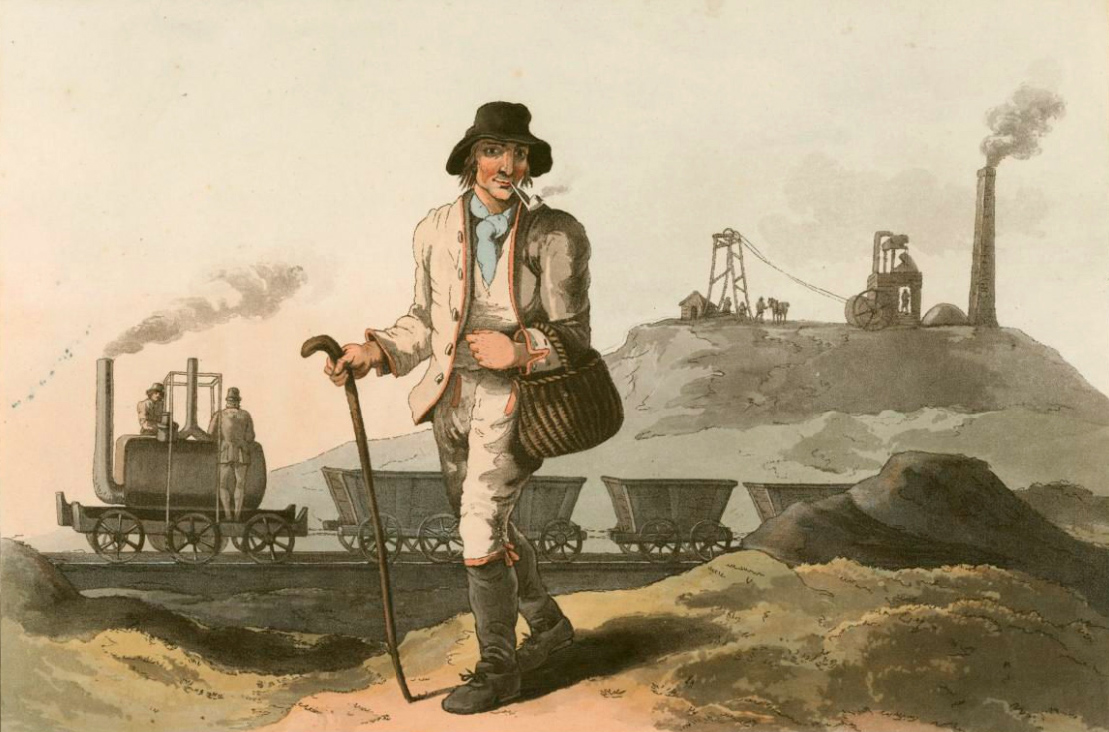
"The Collier", aquatint from a painting by George Walker in his The Costume of Yorkshire, engraved by Robert Havell 1814, showing a Matthew Murray steam locomotive (Salamanca) on the Middleton Railway

Coal has been worked in Middleton since the 13th century, from bell pits, gin pits and later "day level" or adits. Anne Leigh, heiress to the Middleton Estates, married Ralph Brandling from Felling near Gateshead on the River Tyne. They lived in Gosforth and left running of the Middleton pits to agents. Charles Brandling was their successor. In 1754, Richard Humble, from Tyneside, was his agent. Brandling was in competition with the Fentons in Rothwell who were able to transport coal into Leeds by river, putting the Middleton pits at considerable disadvantage. Humble's solution was to build waggonways which were common in his native north east. The first waggonway in 1755 crossed Brandling land and that of friendly neighbours to riverside staithes at Thwaite Gate.

Middleton Railway Act 1757
- Act of Parliament
- Parliament of Great Britain
- Long title: An Act for establishing Agreements made between Charles Brandling Esquire and other Persons, Proprietors of Lands, for laying down a Waggonway, in order for the better supplying the Town and Neighbourhood of Leeds, in the County of York, with Coals.
- Citation: 31 Geo. 2 c. 22 Pr.
- Territorial extent: Great Britain

Dates
- Royal assent: 9 June 1758
- Commencement: 1 December 1757 (Note: Start of session.)
- Repealed: 31 July 1978
Other legislation
Repealed by	Statute Law (Repeals) Act 1978

Status: Repealed

In 1757, he proposed to build a waggonway towards Leeds, and to ensure its permanence Brandling sought ratification in an act of Parliament, the Middleton Railway Act 1757 (31 Geo. 2 c. 22 Pr.), the first authorising the building of a railway.

An Act for Establishing Agreement made between Charles Brandling, Esquire, and other Persons, Proprietors of Lands, for laying down a Waggon-Way in order for the better supplying the Town and Neighbourhood of Leeds in the County of York, with Coals.

The Middleton Railway, the first railway to be granted powers by an act of Parliament, carried coal cheaply from the Middleton pits to the Staith at Casson Close, Leeds (near Meadow Lane, close to the River Aire). Not all the land belonged to Brandling, and the act gave him power to obtain wayleave. Otherwise the line was privately financed and operated, initially as a waggonway using horse-drawn waggons. Around 1799 the wooden tracks began to be replaced with superior iron edge rails to a gauge of 4 ft 1 in (1,245 mm).

Cheap Middleton coal gradually enabled Leeds to become a centre of the many developing industries which used coal as a source of heat, e.g. for pottery, brick and glass making, metal working, and brewing, or as a source of power for mill and factory engines.

== Introduction of steam ==
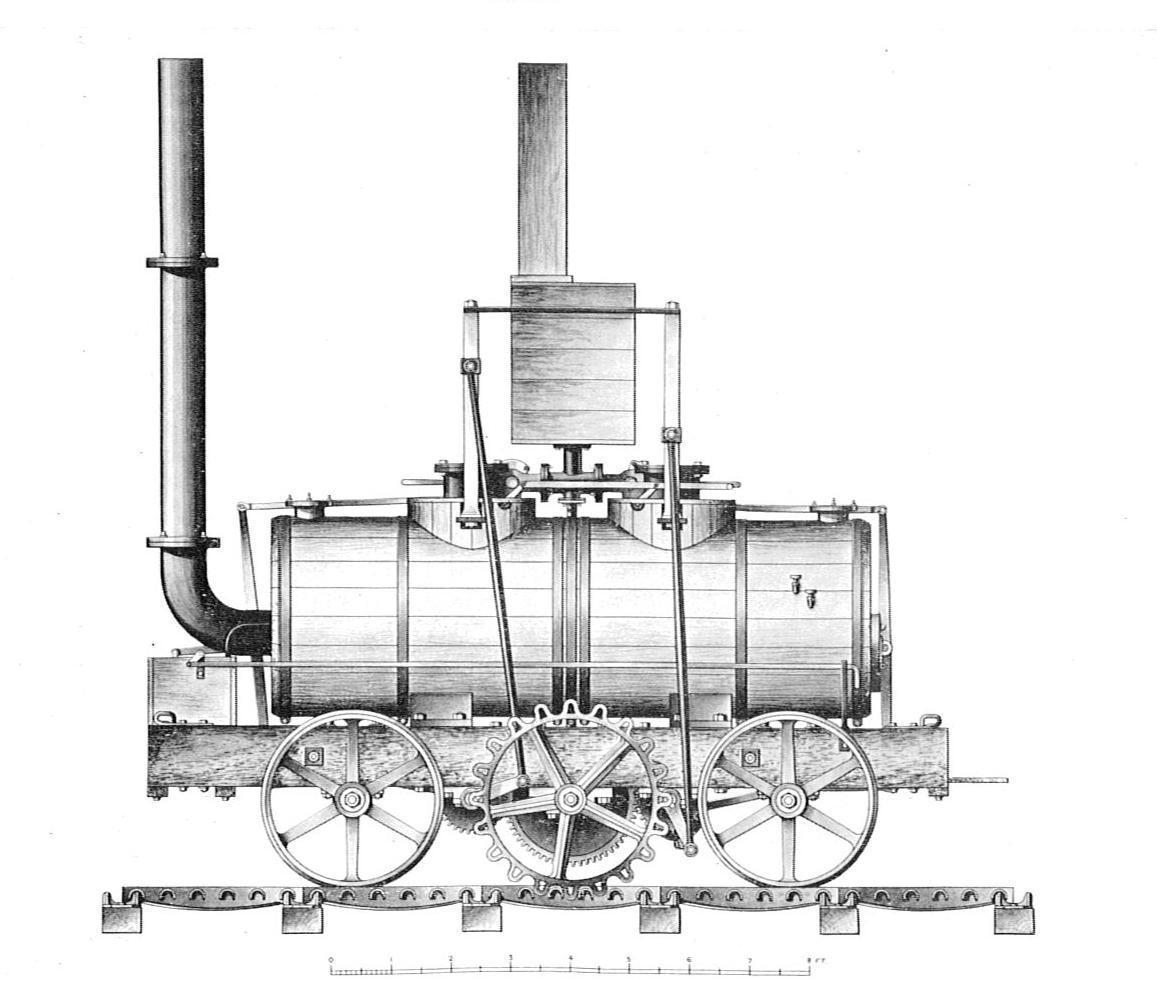
Salamanca

In 1812, the Middleton Railway became the first commercial railway to use steam locomotives successfully. John Blenkinsop, the colliery's viewer, or manager, had decided that an engine light enough not to break the cast iron track would not have sufficient adhesion, bearing in mind the heavy load of coal wagons and the steep track gradient. Accordingly, he relaid the track on one side with a toothed rail, which he patented in 1811 (the first rack railway), and approached Matthew Murray of Fenton, Murray and Wood, in Holbeck, to design a locomotive with a pinion which would mesh with it. Murray's design was based on Richard Trevithick's Catch me who can, adapted to use Blenkinsop's rack and pinion system, and probably was called Salamanca. This 1812 locomotive was the first to use two cylinders. These drove the pinions through cranks which were at right angles, so that the engine would start wherever it came to rest.

In 1812, Salamanca was the first commercial steam locomotive to operate successfully. Three other locomotives were built for the Middleton colliery, and the railway was locomotive-operated for more than twenty years. A number of other firsts can be claimed by the railway. Being the first line to use steam locomotives regularly on freight trains it was naturally the first line to employ a train driver. The world's first regular, professional train driver was a former pit surface labourer named James Hewitt who had been trained by Fenton, Murray & Wood's test driver. The first member of the public to be killed by a locomotive was almost certainly a 13-year-old boy named John Bruce killed in February 1813 whilst running alongside the tracks. The Leeds Mercury reported that this would "operate as a warning to others".

Though it was considered a marvel at the time, a child who witnessed it was less impressed. The child, David Joy, became a successful engineer.

Living in Hunslet Lane, on the London Road, the old coal railway from the Middleton Pits into Leeds, ran behind our house a few fields off, and we used to see the steam from the engines rise above the trees. Once I remember going with my nurse, who held my hand (I had to stretch it up to hers, I was so little) while we stood to watch the engine with its train of coal-wagons pass. We were told it would come up like a flash of lightning, but it only came lumbering on like a cart.

== Boiler explosions and horse haulage ==
Salamanca's boiler exploded on 28 February 1818, killing the driver, as the explosion "carried, with great violence, into an adjoining field the distance of one hundred yards." This was the result of the driver tampering with the safety valves. Another boiler explosion occurred on 12 February 1834, again killing the driver. This time the most likely cause was a badly worn boiler, kept going by in-house repairs which were no longer expertly carried out after Blenkinsop's death. The driver killed on this occasion was James Hewitt, the world's first regular locomotive driver.

The Blenkinsop engines remained at work for thirty years: when John Urpeth Rastrick and James Walker visited the line on the behalf of the Directors of the Liverpool and Manchester Railway in January 1829 noted they were still at work, one of them being recorded as pulling a load of thirty load coal wagons, weighing 140 tons. At least two were working until 1835.

Horse haulage returned and steam was abandoned apart from about a 1-mile (1.6 km) section near the main pit, which for some time was chain-worked by a stationary steam engine.

== Return of steam ==
Steam was reintroduced in 1866 with tank engines from local firm Manning Wardle. In 1881 the railway was converted to 4 ft 8 1/2 in (1,435 mm) standard gauge allowing it to connect with the Midland Railway. Other extra links included one to the Great Northern Railway in 1899 and sidings serving other sources of freight including Robinson & Birdsell's scrapyard and Clayton, Sons & Co's engineering works. The Middleton Estate & Colliery Co became part of the nationalised National Coal Board in 1947. Some rationalisation took place, the city centre staith at Kidacre street was closed and in the end coal movement was concentrated on the stretch of line from the GNR connection to Broom Pit. Preservationists mainly from Leeds University were allowed to move into an abandoned part of the line, between Moor Road and the GNR connection, by its then owners Messrs. Clayton, Son & Co. When Broom Pit closed in 1968 the preservationists, by then called the Middleton Railway Trust, were able to reinstate the connection and operate to the site of Broom Pit, maintaining the continuous operation of the line.

== Preservation ==
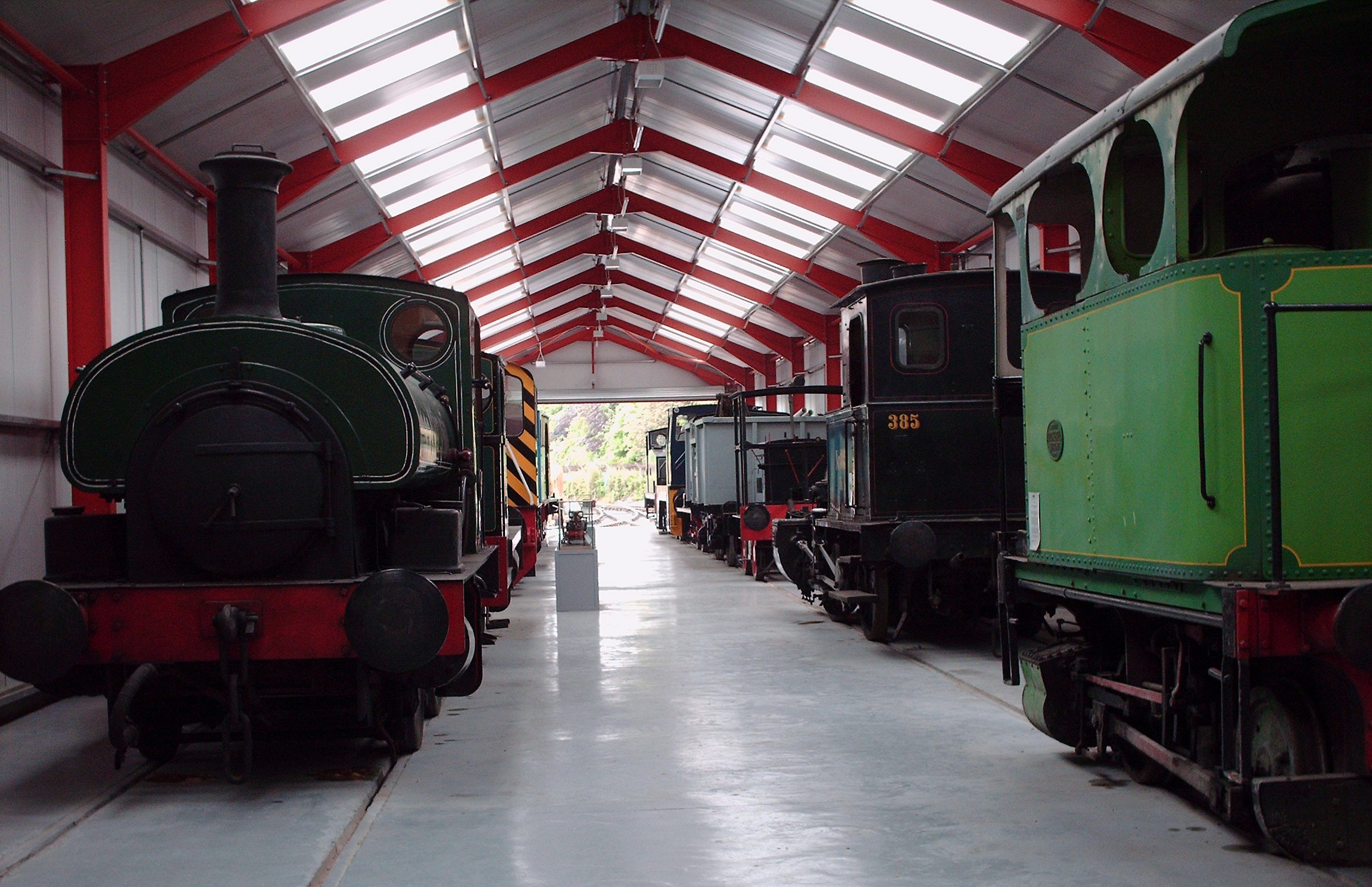
The engine shed museum

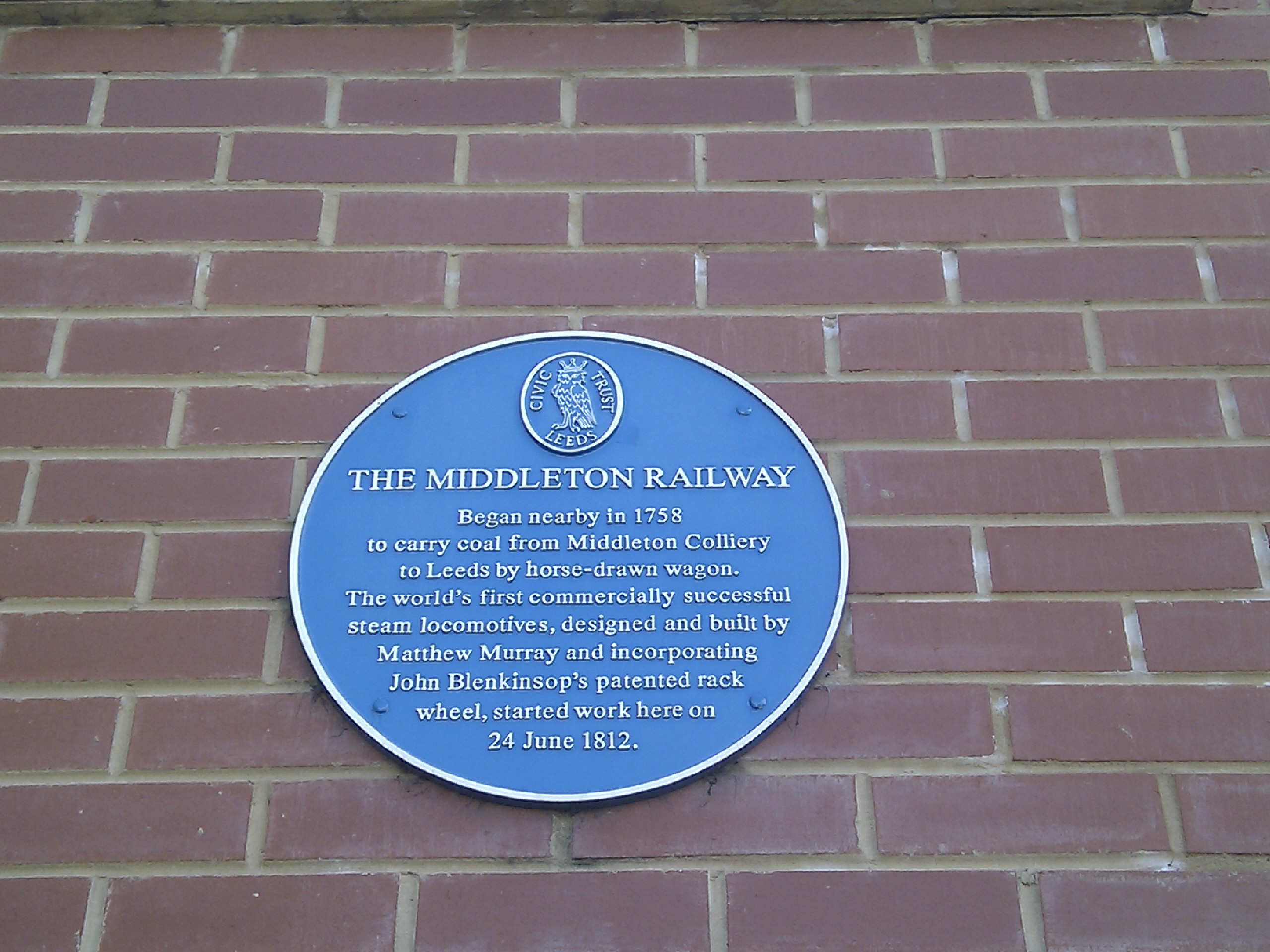
Middleton Railway Blue Plaque

In June 1960, the Middleton Railway became the second standard-gauge railway to be taken over and operated by unpaid volunteers. Most were volunteers from Leeds University’s railway society. Passenger services were initially operated for only one week, using an ex Swansea and Mumbles Railway double deck tram (the largest in Britain, seating 106 passengers), hauled by a 1931 diesel locomotive hired from the nearby Hunslet Engine Company. However, the volunteers of the Middleton Railway subsequently operated a freight service from September 1960 until 1983.

Regular operation of passenger services began in 1969.

The Middleton Steam Railway is home to a representative selection of locomotives built in the Jack Lane, Hunslet area by the famous Leeds manufacturers of John Fowler & Co., Hudswell Clarke, Hunslet Engine Company, Kitson & Co. and Manning Wardle. The locomotives include "Sir Berkeley", which was featured in the 1968 BBC TV version of "The Railway Children". The locomotive is owned by the Vintage Carriages Trust of Ingrow near Keighley.

== Route and stations ==
Although the operational line starts at Moor Road, the line actually begins with the Balm Road Branch which joins the Middleton Railway with the Leeds – Sheffield route of the Hallam & Pontefract Lines. However, the connection to the main network has not been used since 1990 and has been bolted closed preventing access. This section of track crosses Beza Road, Tulip Street and Moor Road. It is currently only used during special events as the line and crossings would need upgrading for regular use.

Located few yards from Moor Road level crossing is the line's main terminus, Moor Road station. The site includes the Engine House museum and workshops along with a single platform for departing and arriving trains. The site was once a junction between the link to the Midland Railway mainline via the "Balm Road Branch" and the line to Kidacre Street coal staith near the centre of the city.

Departing Moor Road, are a selection of locomotives and rolling stock stored on sidings before the tunnel. The tunnel is the only one located on the route and allows the railway to pass under the M621 motorway. It is approximately 263 feet (80 m) long. Immediately after, there is the junction with the Dartmouth Branch, a stub of the line that once connected various local metal industries with the main line. This is occasionally used on special events and has in recent years been used for training mainline track workers. This branch is close to the former connection to the Great Northern line.

After the Dartmouth Branch, the line begins to enter Middleton Park. The line passes by the John Charles Centre for Sport on its right and the South Leeds Academy on its left. There are two over bridges on this section: one road bridge, carrying John Charles Approach and a second footbridge connecting the school and the sports centre.

Located close to the site of Broom Pit colliery and on the edge of Middleton Park, Park Halt railway station is the current terminus of services at the far end of the line. Branches once continued to Day Hole End and to West Pit via a rope worked incline. There were also numerous wagonways from early pits in the park, the remains of which can still be seen. The station consists of a platform for Middleton Park and a run round loop for trains allowing return running.

A proposed extension of the railway into Middleton Park has been discussed for many years and it has long been the ambition of the railway to run further in to Middleton Park. Plans have existed for some time to extend the railway to the centre of the park, however this would require significant earthworks and funding.

== Motive power ==
=== Steam locomotives ===
Number / Name	Design	Manufacturer	Notes	Image
Operational
2387 Brookes No.1	0-6-0ST	Hunslet Engine Company	During preservation it wore a Thomas the Tank Engine guise including conversion to a tank engine. It has since been reverted to a saddle tank and to original condition. Boiler ticket expired in 2009 and underwent overhaul that was funded by the Heritage Lottery Fund. Returned to service in August 2017. Boiler ticket expires 2027. Main operational loco alongside 'No.6' and 'Sir Berkeley'.	
3860 No. 6	0-4-0ST	Hawthorn Leslie and Company	Worked for Portland cement at Swansombe in Kent. It was named 'Percy' by the 'Rev W. Awdry' due to the likeness with a character in his book series. However, this name is no longer carried due to licensing issues and expenses. Middleton Railway retain its nameplates however these are not on display. Operational. Returned to service in September 2021. Boiler ticket expires 2031. Main operational loco alongside 'Brookes No.1' and 'Sir Berkeley'.	
1210 Sir Berkeley	L Class 0-6-0ST	Manning Wardle	Boiler ticket expires in 2033. On long term/permanent loan from the Vintage Carriages Trust. It returned to service in 2023 after an overhaul the Middleton Railway did on contract with the Vintage Carriages Trust. When not visiting other heritage railways, it is part of the main running fleet alongside 'Brookes No.1' and 'No.6'.	
LNER No. 54 / BR No. 68153 / Departmental No. 57	LNER Class Y1 0-4-0VBT	Sentinel Waggon Works	Returned to service in 2021. Boiler ticket expires 2029. As of 2025, it sees on the 2nd Sunday of every operational month, as an event labelled 'Sentinel Sunday'.	
Undergoing overhaul/restoration
1544 Slough Estates No. 3	0-6-0ST	Hudswell Clarke	Built in 1924. Arrived from the Swindon and Cricklade Railway in November 2011 Boiler ticket expired on 18 April 2021. Its overhaul commenced in 2022. The overhaul is being done by Middleton Railway with financial assistance from the locomotive's owners the Slough & Windsor Railway Society. Has returned to passenger service as of the 7th June 2026.	
1493 No. 11	0-4-0ST	Hunslet Engine Company	Undergoing restoration. Owned by a member of the Middleton Railway Trust. Moved to Middleton Railway in 2000 where it has been being overhauled for over 20 years. Seen as a long-term project to be completed in the near future when time and money becomes available.	
385	Chemnitz 0-4-0WT	Richard Hartmann	Previously owned by the Danish State Railways (DSB). Arrived at the Railway in 1972 and last steamed in 1999. Displayed in the Engine House museum until 2025. Overhaul to operational condition has commenced as of mid may 2026.	
Static display
1310	NER Class H / LNER Class Y7 0-4-0T	Gateshead Railway Works	Returned to traffic in October 2011. It was withdrawn following the expiration of its boiler ticket extension on 23 July 2023 and placed on display in the Engine House museum awaiting overhaul.	
1309 Henry De Lacy II	0-4-0ST	Hudswell Clarke	Cosmetically restored and displayed in the Engine House museum with access to the cab.	
1369 M.S.C. No.67	0-6-0T	Hudswell Clarke	Boiler ticket expired on 1 January 2012; now displayed in the Engine House museum	
1601 Matthew Murray	L Class 0-6-0ST	Manning Wardle	Returned to service in June 2010. Boiler ticket expired in 2021. It is hoped to restore it to working order however it requires costly work including a new cylinder block.	
1882 Mirvale	0-4-0ST	Hudswell Clarke	Displayed in the Engine House Museum with access to the cab.	
526 Hawarden	0-4-0ST	Hudswell Clarke	Built in 1899. Acquired from Penrhyn Castle Railway Museum in 2024.	
Stored
5469 Conway	0-6-0ST	Kitson and Company	ex Northamptonshire Ironstone Railway. It was sent to Locomotion, Shildon for a cosmetic restoration for display in the Middleton Railway museum. The cosmetic restoration was partly completed with the chassis and tank being painted and having minor metal work repairs. It returned from Locomotion Shildon during 2022 in a part cosmetic restored state. Middleton Railway plan to complete the cosmetic restoration themselves when time and money is available to do so. Currently on display in the Engine House awaiting the completion of its cosmetic restoration.	
1540 Picton	2-6-2T	Hunslet Engine Company	Originally worked on a sugar cane railway in Trinidad. Transported back to England to await conservation. Upon arrival its tanks and various other parts were removed as they were found to be majorly corroded and unsafe. In 2016, a special shelter was constructed in the car park at Moor Road to protect it. During 2020 it was painted black to help reduce corrosion and make it look cosmetically better. It is hoped to fully cosmetically restore it to original condition when time and money is available, likely after the cosmetic restoration of Conway.	
1684	0-4-0T	Hunslet Engine Company	Finished its working life at Kilmersdon Colliery in Somerset. Currently stored undercover at Middleton Railway. Major work required to restore it as it has not run in preservation. It is in very poor condition with high levels of corrosion. It is hoped to one day restore it but other overhauls are taking priority and it is deemed too costly at the moment.	
2003 John Blenkinsop	0-4-0ST	Peckett and Sons	Stored awaiting overhaul. Currently at the Ribble Steam Railway where it received a minor cosmetic restoration. It is on display in the Ribble Steam Railway museum where it is expected to stay due to the lack of space to store it undercover at Middleton Railway. It is hoped to one day return it to Middleton Railway for full restoration to operational condition but this is unlikely to happen in the foreseeable future due to time, money and resources needed and other restoration taking a higher priority.	

=== Diesel and electric locomotives ===
Number / Name	Design	Manufacturer	Notes	Image
Operational
45	0-6-0DM	Hudswell Clarke	Arrived in September 2017 from the East Somerset Railway. It is the main operational diesel on the line and is used regularly on the lines Saturday diesel trains. It is also often used as a standby diesel if a fellow steam or diesel locomotive fails.	
D577 Mary	0-4-0DM	Hudswell Clarke	Built in 1932. On display in the museum and sees occasional use mainly on special events days.	
D631 Carroll	0-4-0DM	Hudswell Clarke	Built in 1946. On display in the museum and sees occasional use mainly on special events days.	
1697 John Alcock	LMS diesel shunter 7051 0-6-0DM	Hunslet Engine Company	The Middleton Railways Trust's first locomotive. On display in the museum and sees occasional use mainly on special events days.	
1786 Courage	0-4-0DM	Hunslet Engine Company	Named after the brewery where it worked. Also known as Sweet Pea. Can only operate in conjunction with another loco due to lack of vacuum brakes and as such is used rarely on passenger services. Mainly sees use during special events. Overhauled to original condition in 2025 for its 90th birthday.	
5003 Austins No. 1	0-4-0DM	Peckett and Sons	Built in 1961. Acquired in 2001. Used regularly on the Saturday diesel service.	
D2999 Alf	British Rail Class D2/11 0-4-0DE	Brush/Beyer Peacock	In traffic 2015. Used occasionally on the Saturday diesel service due to it having regular problems with the sanders leading to a loss of air pressure	
4220033 Harry	0-4-0DM	John Fowler & Co.	Returned to traffic 2016. During 2019 it was vandalised and received major damage to the cab, controls and windows. Restoration work was completed and it returned to service in late 2022. Currently in the workshop and is not in operational condition.	
Non-Operational
6981	0-4-0DM	Hunslet Engine Company	Currently undergoing restoration with a full engine restoration, cosmetic work and addition of vacuum brakes. All required before it can begin passenger use. Acquired 2011 by a member of the railway and sold directly to the railway shortly after. It arrived in excellent condition however a full restoration is being completed to ensure it is a regular and reliable loco into the future. Its restoration is expected to be completed in 2026.	
420452	Coke Oven locomotive	Greenwood and Batley	Electric locomotive. Built 1979. Currently stored undercover but not on public display due to the lack of space. It is hoped that it can be cosmetically restored and displayed at another railway or museum but there is currently no plan.	
DB998901 Olive	Overhead Line Inspection Vehicle	Drewry Car Co.	Built 1950. Used by British Railways' Eastern Region and British Rail Research Division. Acquired 1997. It was subject to an arson attack at Moor Road in 2016. It received major bodywork repairs and a body rebuild at the Vintage Carriages Trust workshop at Ingrow West (on the Keighley and Worth Valley Railway. It returned to Middleton once work was completed. It is currently awaiting funding and resources to become available to restore the interior and fix several major mechanical issues. It is unknown when this will return to service as little work has been completed on it since 2017.	
3900002	0-4-0DM	John Fowler & Co.	On static display in the Engine House. Engine doors removed and engine labelled to show visitors different parts of the engine and how it works.	

=== Trams ===
Following the closure of the Mumbles Railway by South Wales Transport attempts were made to preserve some rolling stock at the Middleton Railway. One car (no. 2) was saved for preservation by members of Leeds University in Yorkshire and stored at the Middleton Railway. However, it was heavily vandalised and eventually destroyed by fire leading to the tram being scrapped. An experimental Leeds single deck tram, number 601, was preserved at the Middleton Railway along with tram 202 owned by Leeds Museums. These were, however, also destroyed by vandalism and arson during 1962. Leeds Horsfield Tram No 160 and Feltham Tram No 517 suffered the same fate at Middleton in 1968.

Number / Name	Design	Manufacturer	Notes	Image
Scrapped
No. 2	Double Deck Tram seating 106 passengers	Brush Electrical Company	Built c. 1929	

=== Rolling stock ===
Number / Name	Design	Manufacturer	Notes	Image
Passenger Stock
1867	PMV Standard Brake	Southern Railway	Converted from ex SR PMV Van. Fitted with heating.	
2084	PMV Standard Trailer	Southern Railway	Converted from ex SR PMV Van. Fitted with heating and designed for easier wheelchair access.	
1074	PMV Standard Brake	Southern Railway	Converted from ex SR PMV Van. Fitted with heating and designed for easier wheelchair access.	
2223	PMV Standard Trailer	Southern Railway	Converted from ex SR PMV Van. Fitted with heating and designed for easier wheelchair access..	
860E	Brake Van	Birmingham Railway Carriage & Wagon works	Build to a North Eastern Railway Design. Capacity of 10 people. Often used at gala weekends and in Santa Special trains. Fitted with vacuum brakes.	
158760	LMS Brake Van	LMS (Derby)	Full restoration completed including renewal of all woodwork. Restored to how it was when it moved to the railway. It is rarely used due to its large weight and lack of vacuum brakes. It is currently on display in the museum with access inside.	

== Bibliography ==
- A History of the Middleton Railway Leeds Sixth Edition, Middleton Railway Trust Limited, 1990
- A History of the Middleton Railway, Eighth Edition, Middleton Railway Trust, ISBN 0-9516205-5-X, 2004
- From Rag to Railway, Middleton Railway Trust, ISBN 978-0-9558264-5-0
- Middleton Railway stocklist, Middleton Railway Trust, available from the railway's shop
- Roe, Martin. Coal Mining in Middleton Park. Meerstone. ISBN 978-0-9559477-0-4.
- Ransom, P. J. G. (1990), The Victorian Railway and How It Evolved, London: Heinemann
