= Machine coordinate system =

In the manufacturing industry, with regard to numerically controlled machine tools, the phrase machine coordinate system refers to the physical limits of the motion of the machine in each of its axes, and to the numerical coordinate which is assigned (by the machine tool builder) to each of these limits. CNC Machinery refers to machines and devices that are controlled by using programmed commands which are encoded on to a storage medium, and NC refers to the automation of machine tools that are operated by abstract commands programmed and encoded onto a storage medium.

== Types of Machine Coordinate Systems ==
The absolute coordinate system uses the cartesian coordinate system, where a point on the machine is specifically defined. The cartesian coordinate system is a set of three number lines labeled X, Y, and Z, which are used to determine the point in the workspace that the machine needs to operate in. This absolute coordinate system allows the machine operator to edit the machine code in a way where the specifically defined section is easy to pinpoint. Before putting in theses coordinates though, the machine operator needs to set a point of origin on the machine. The point of origin in the cartesian system is 0, 0, 0. This allows the machine operator to know which directions are positive and negative in the cartesian plane. It also makes sure that every move made is based on the distance from this origin point.

The relative coordinate system, also known as the incremental coordinate system, also uses the cartesian coordinate system, but in a different manner. The relative coordinate system allows the machine operator to define a point in the workspace based on, or relative to, the previous point that the machine tool was at. This means that after every move the machine tool makes, the point that it ends up at is based on the distance from the previous point. So, the origin set on the machine changes after every move.

The polar coordinate system does not use the cartesian coordinate system. It uses the distance from the point of origin to the point, and the angle from either the point of origin or the previous point used. This means that the polar coordinate system can be used in tangent with either the absolute coordinate system or the relative coordinate system. This just has to be specified within the code of the machine being used. The points in the polar coordinate system can be measured using a rule and protractor to get an approximate point, or the machine operator can use trigonometry to find the exact number needed for the machine to work.
