= Machine factory =

Type of company

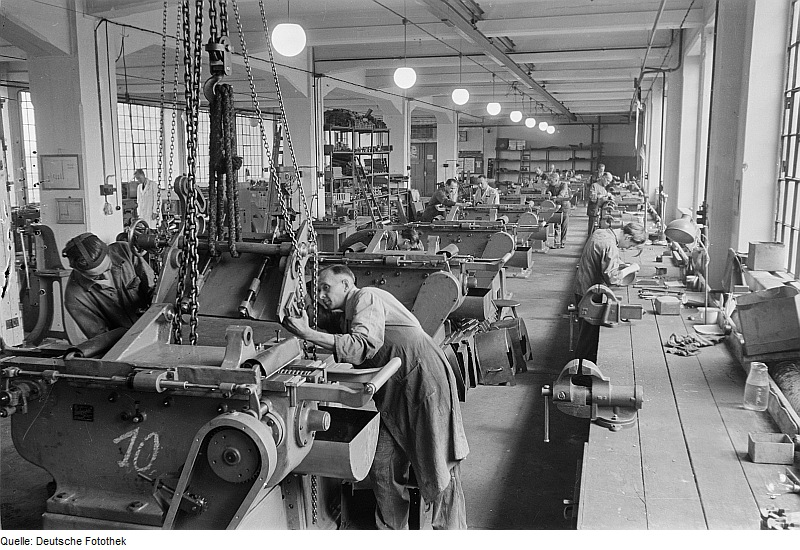
The assembly of machines around 1950.

A machine factory is a company that produces machines. These companies traditionally belong to the heavy industry sector in comparison to a more consumer oriented and less capital intensive light industry. Today many companies make more sophisticated smaller machines, and they belong to the light industry. The economic sector of machine factories is called the machine industry.

== History ==
The machinery factories came into existence in the course of the Industrial Revolution. Late 18th century most production machines, were still made of wood and manufactured in local workshops. The first industrial factories, such as cotton mills and cotton weavers, started their own workshops, where clockmakers, instrument makers, joiners and cabinet makers were employed to build and maintain the production machines.

In the first half of the 19th century gradually the wooden machinery got replaced by metal machine. The machine building gradually broke loose from the textile industry and independent companies emerged specializing in textile machinery, machine tools, locomotives, large steam engines, etc. Most companies in countries as England, France and Germany kept making their own special tools and machines. Lintsen recalled that "only shortly before 1850, there is clear evidence of success in the effort to build 'machines with machines'. A number of so-called machine tools - lathes, planers, drills, cutters - gained the degree of accuracy needed to produce larger series of interchangeable parts. But even these standardization of parts did not mean the end of the individual craftsmanship in the machine industry."

The first machine tools offered for sale (i.e., commercially available) were constructed by Matthew Murray in England around 1800. Others, such as Henry Maudslay, James Nasmyth, and Joseph Whitworth, soon followed the path of expanding their entrepreneurship from manufactured end products and millwright work into the realm of building machine tools for sale. in the 1830s James Nasmyth had "somewhat to his surprise... discovered, that there was really a market emerging for readymade lathes, planers, drills and flat banks. That demand partly originated from the people building the Lancashire textile machinery, and partly from the new phenomenon: the railways. The fast-growing rail network had locomotives, equipped repair shops, tracks and more demands."

In the second part of the 19th century more and more machine factories were started. These companies partly grew out of iron foundries, shipyards, forges and repair shops. Many production machines were sold to machine shops, where parts and consumer products were produced. Early 20th century several motorcycle and automobile manufacturers began their own machine factories.

Nowadays, many of the contemporary machine factories are smaller in size and belong to the light or medium metal. This type of companies generally produce specific production machines and /or devices, in which fine mechanics and electronics often plays a significantly role. Some of these types of companies have been around for decades, others are constantly created.

== Types of machine factories ==
=== Agricultural machine factories ===
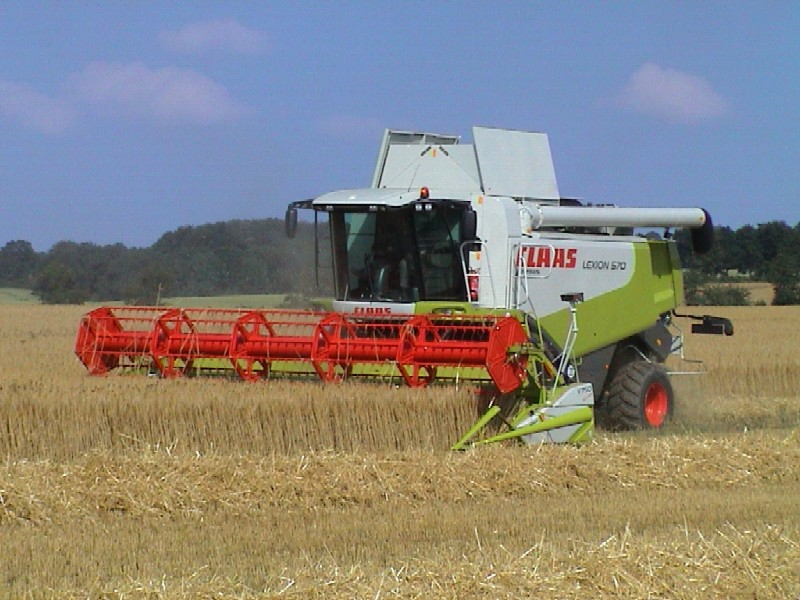
German combine harvester.

Agricultural machinery is machinery used in the operation of an agricultural area or farm. There is a range of machinery from tractor and to agricultural implements for soil cultivation, planting, fertilizing & pest control, irrigation, produce sorter, harvesting, hay making, loading and milking. These are produced by agricultural machinery manufacturers, and farming machines factories.

=== Engine manufacturers ===
An engine or motor is a machine designed to convert energy into useful mechanical motion. Heat engines, including internal combustion engines and external combustion engines (such as steam engines) burn a fuel to create heat, which then creates motion. Electric motors convert electrical energy into mechanical motion, pneumatic motors use compressed air and others—such as clockwork motors in wind-up toys—use elastic energy. In biological systems, molecular motors, like myosins in muscles, use chemical energy to create motion.

=== Home appliance manufacturers ===
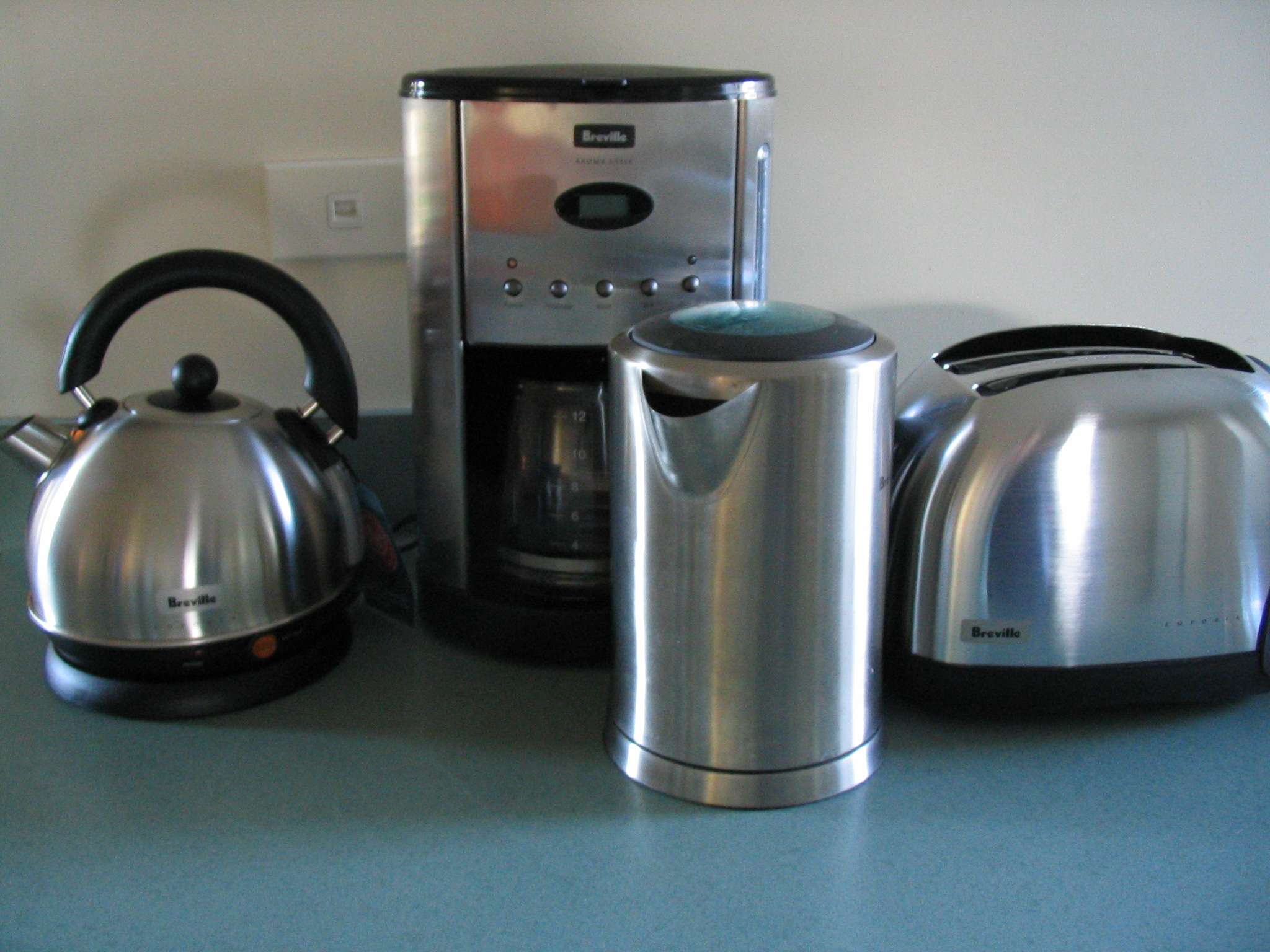
Kitchen appliances.

Home appliances are electrical/mechanical machines which accomplish some household functions, such as cooking or cleaning.

- Major appliance, or domestic appliance, or white goods. Home appliances can be classified into:
- Small appliances, Small domestic appliances, or brown goods
- Consumer electronics

This division is noticeable in the maintenance and repair of these kinds of products. Brown goods usually require high technical knowledge and skills (which get more complex with time, such as going from a soldering iron to a hot-air soldering station), while white goods may need more practical skills and "brute force" to manipulate the devices and heavy tools required to repair them.

Specific machine factories in this field are sewing machine factory, and washing machine factory.

=== Industrial machine manufacturers ===
Industrial machine manufacturers produce machine tools, production machines and other industrial equipment.

=== Machine tool industry ===
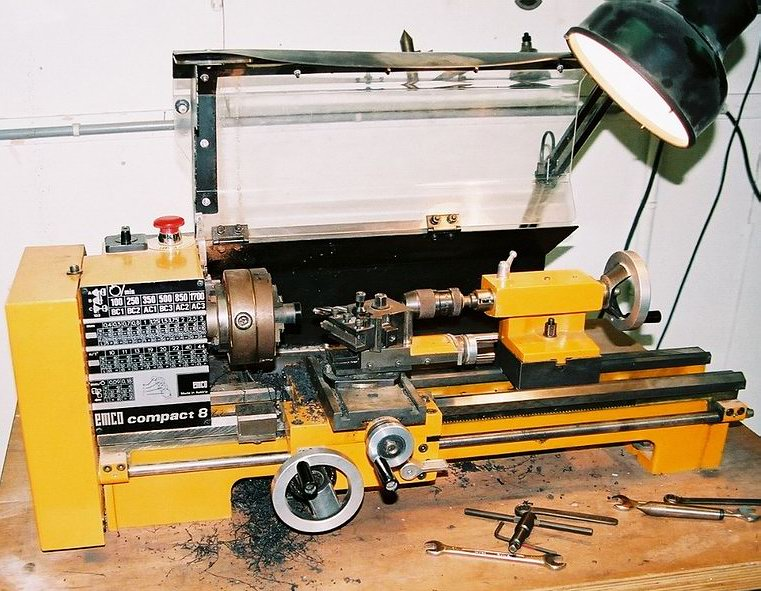
A lathe, a machine tool

A machine tool builder in the broadest sense is a corporation or person that builds machine tools. In the most common (and economically significant) sense of the term, a machine tool builder is a corporation whose business is building machine tools for sale to manufacturers, who use them to manufacture products. The machine tools often make interchangeable parts, which are assembled into subassemblies or finished assemblies, ending up sold to consumers, either directly or through other businesses at intermediate links of a value-adding chain. Alternatively, the machine tools may help make molds or dies, which then make the parts for the assemblies.

=== Some other types ===
- Coin machine factories
- Factory of hydraulic machines
- Printing machine factory
- Road machines factory,
- Steam machine factory

== See also ==
- Machine
- Machine industry
- Machine shop
- Machine tool
- Machine tool builder
