= Machine industry =

Subsector of the industry

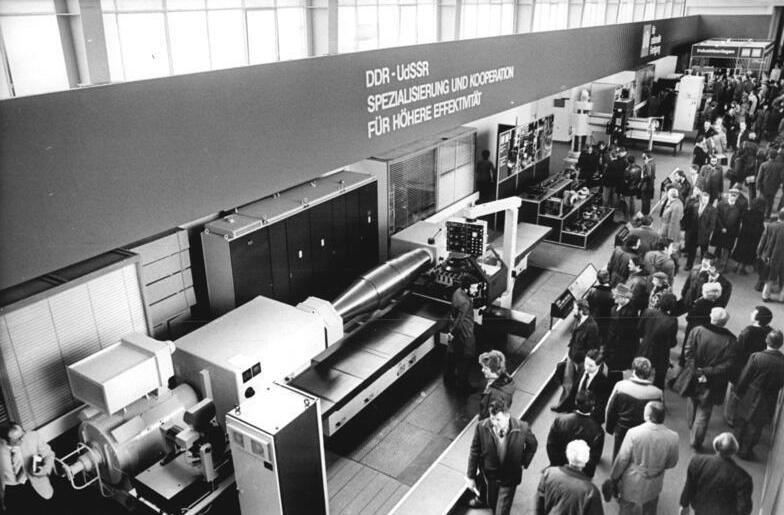
Presentation of machinery industry on a fair in Dresden, 1982

The machine industry or machinery industry is a subsector of the industry, that produces and maintains machines for consumers, the industry, and most other companies in the economy.

This machine industry traditionally belongs to the heavy industry. Nowadays, many smaller industrial manufacturing companies in this branch are considered part of the light industry. Most machine tool manufacturers in the machinery industry are called machine factories.

== Overview ==
The machine industry is a subsector of the industry that produces a range of products from power tools, different types of machines, and domestic technology to factory equipment etc. On the one hand the machine industry provides:

- The means of production for businesses in the agriculture, mining, industry and construction.
- The means of production for public utility, such as equipment for the production and distribution of gas, electricity and water.
- A range of supporting equipment for all sectors of the economy, such as equipment for heating, ventilation, and air conditioning of buildings.

These means of production are called capital goods, because a certain amount of capital is invested. Much of those production machines require regular maintenance, which becomes supplied specialized companies in the machine industry.

On the other end the machinery industry supplies consumer goods, including kitchen appliances, refrigerators, washers, dryers and a like. Production of radio and television, however, is generally considered belonging to the electrical equipment industry. The machinery industry itself is a major customer of the steel industry.

The production of the machinery industry varies widely from single-unit production and series production to mass production. Single-unit production is about constructing unique products, which are specified in specific customer requirements. Due to modular design such devices and machines can often be manufactured in small series, which significantly reduces the costs. From a certain stage in the production, the specific customer requirements are built-in, and the unique product is created.

== History ==
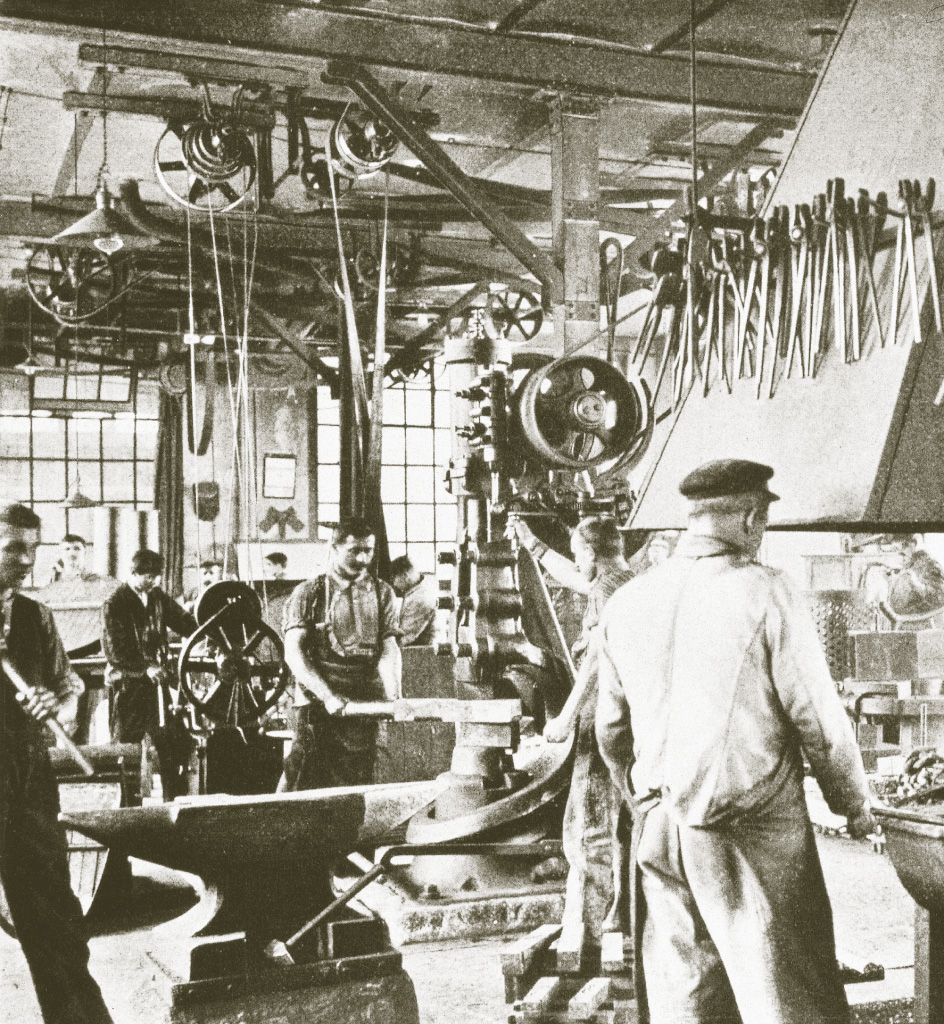
Interior of the Swiss machine factory, late 19th century

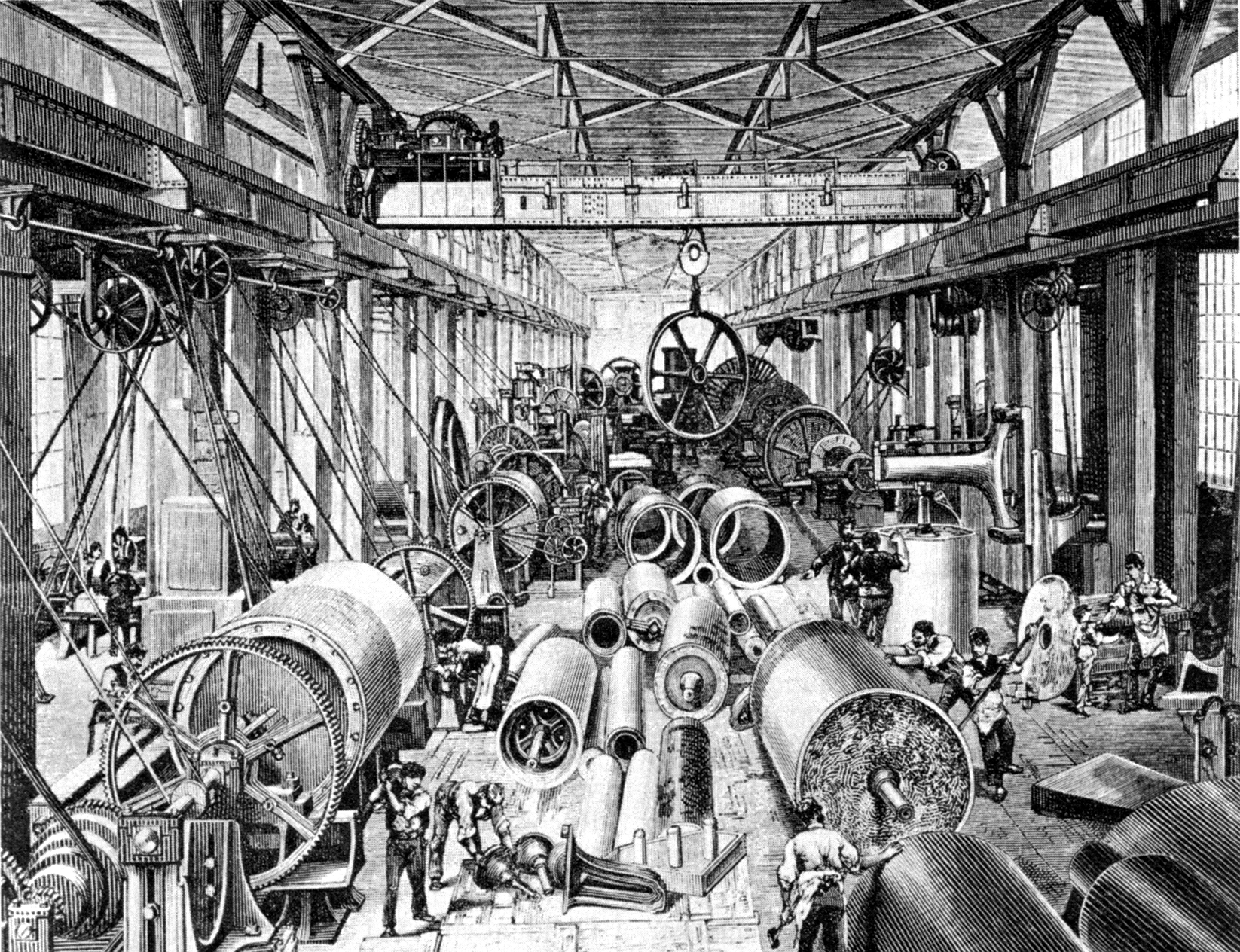
Machine shop of Swiss machine factory Escher Wyss, 1875

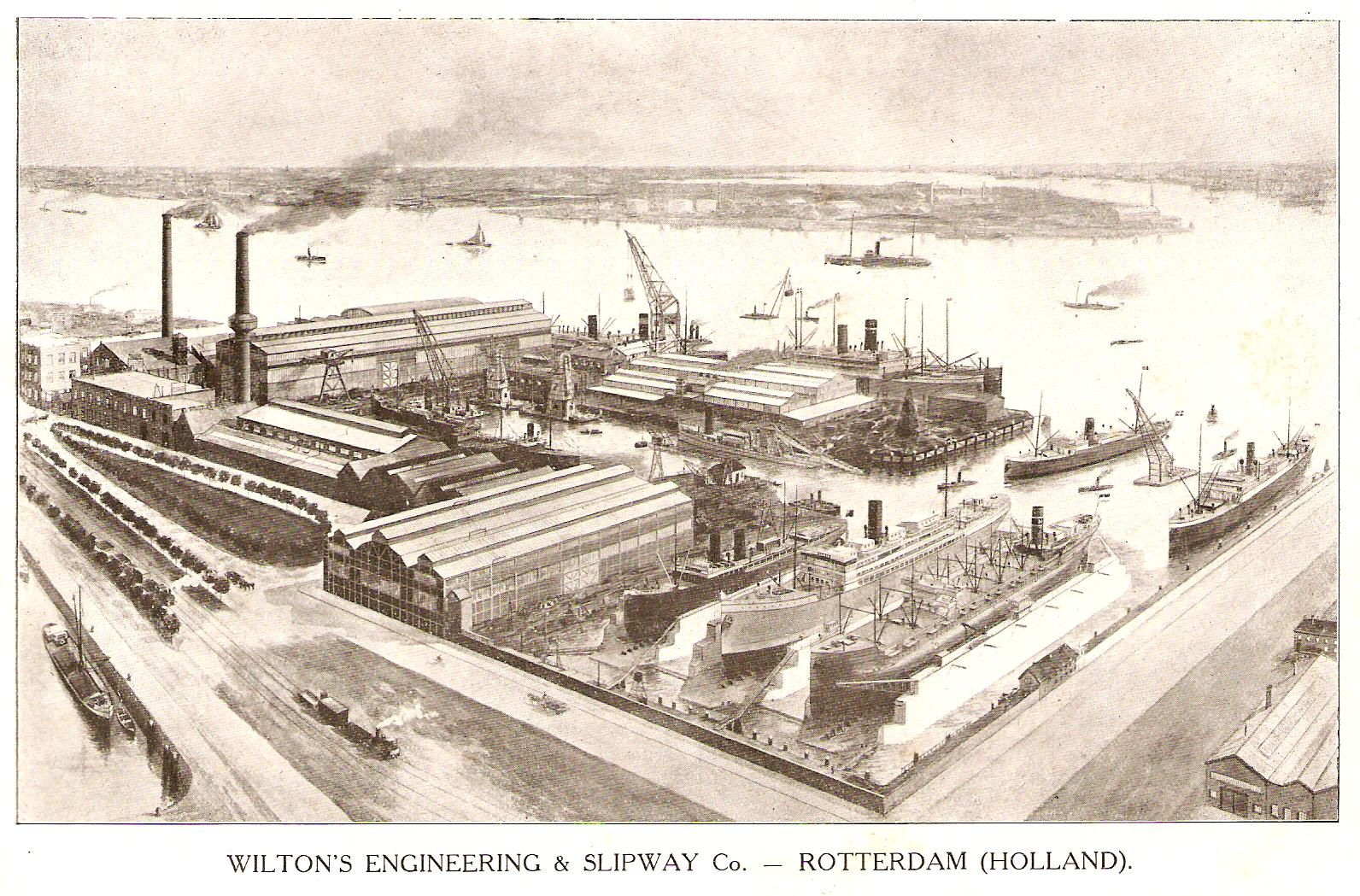
Wilton machine factory and shipyard, c. 1918

The machinery industry came into existence during the Industrial Revolution. Companies in this emerging field grew out of iron foundries, shipyards, forges and repair shops. Often companies were a combination of machine factory and shipyard. Early in the 20th century several motorcycle and automobile manufacturers began their own machine factories.

Prior to the industrial revolution a variety of machines existed such as clocks, weapons and running gear for mills (watermill, windmill, horse mill etc.) Production of these machines were on much smaller scale in artisan workshops mostly for the local or regional market. With the advent of the industrial revolution manufacturing began of composite tools with more complex construction, such as steam engines and steam generators for the evolving industry and transport. In addition, the emerging machine factories started making machines for production machines as textile machinery, compressors, agricultural machinery, and engines for ships.

=== 18th century ===
During the first decades of the industrial revolution in England, from 1750, there was a concentration of labor usually in not yet mechanized factories. Many new machines were invented, which were initially made by the inventors themselves. Early in the 18th century, the first steam engines, the Newcomen engine, came into use throughout Britain and Europe, principally to pump water out of mines.

In the 1770s James Watt significantly improved this design. He introduced a steam engine easy employable to supply a large amounts of energy, which set the mechanization of factories underway. In England certain cities concentrated on making specific products, such as specific types of textiles or pottery. Around these cities specialized machinery industry arose in order to enable the mechanization of the plants. Hereby late in the 18th century arose the first machinery industry in the UK and also in Germany and Belgium.

=== 19th century ===
The Industrial Revolution received a further boost with the upcoming railways. These arose at the beginning of the 19th century in England as innovation in the mining industry. The work in coal mines was hard and dangerous, and so there was a great need for tools to ease this work. In 1804, Richard Trevithick placed the first steam engine on rails, and was in 1825 the Stockton and Darlington Railway was opened, intended to transport coals from the mine to the port. In 1835 the first train drove in continental Europe between Mechelen and Brussels, and in the Netherlands in 1839 the first train drove between Amsterdam and Haarlem. For the machinery industry this brought all sorts of new work with new machinery for metallurgy, machine tool for metalworking, production of steam engines for trains with all its necessities etc.

In time the market for the machine industry became wider, specialized products were manufactured for a greater national and often international market. For example, it was not uncommon in the second half of the 19th century that American steelmakers ordered their production in England, where new steelmaking techniques were more advanced. In the far east Japan would import these product until the early 1930s, the creation of an own machinery industry got underway.

=== 20th century to now ===
The term "machinery industry" came into existence later in the 19th century. One of the first times this branch of industry was recognized as such, and was investigated, was in a production statistics of 1907 created by the British Ministry of Trade and Industry. In this statistic the output of the engineering industry, was divided into forty different categories, including for example, agricultural machinery, machinery for the textile industry and equipment, and parts for train and tram.

The inventions of new propulsion techniques based on electric motors, internal combustion engines and gas turbines brought a new generation of machines in the 20th century from cars to household appliances. Not only the product range of the machinery industry increased considerably, but especially smaller machines could also deliver products in much greater numbers fabricated in mass production. With the rise of mass production in other parts of the industry, there was also a high demand for manufacturing and production systems, to increase the entire production.

Shortage of labor in agriculture and industry at the beginning of the second half of the 20th century, raised the need for further mechanization of production, which required for more specific machines. The rise of the computer made further automation of production possible, which in turn set new demands on the machinery industry.

== Classification ==
The machinery industry produces different kind of products, for example, engines, pumps, logistics equipment; for different kind of markets from the agriculture industry, food & beverage industry, manufacturing industry, health industry, and amusement industry till different branches of the consumer market. As such companies in the machine industry can be classified by product of market.

In the world of today, all kinds of Industry classifications exists. Some classifications recognize the machine industry as a specific class, and offer a subdivision for this field. For example, the Dutch Standard Industrial Classification of 1993, developed by the Statistics Netherlands, give the following breakdown of the machinery industry:

SIC code	Description sector	Products (according to the Standard Industrial Classification of the CBS 1993)
291	Manufacture of for the production of mechanical energy, and application and overhaul	Engines and turbines, pumps and compressors, valves, gears, bearings and other gear.
292	Manufacture of other general-purpose machinery and equipment	Industrial furnaces and burners, lifting equipment, lifting equipment and other transport equipment; machines and equipment for industrial refrigeration and air conditioning; machinery and equipment
293	Manufacture of agricultural machinery and equipment	Agricultural tractors; agricultural machinery and agricultural implements
294	Manufacture of machine tools	Machine tools
295	Manufacture of machinery for specific industrial activities and devices	Machines for iron - and steel production; machines for mineral extraction and construction; machines and devices for the food and beverage industry; machines and equipment for the textile, clothing, leather and leather products industry; machinery and equipment for paper and paperboard production; Other machinery and equipment
296	Manufacture of weapons and ammunition	Weapons and ammunition
297	Manufacture of domestic appliances	electrical household appliances; non-electric domestic appliances

This composition of the machinery industry has been significantly altered with the latest revision of the Dutch Standard Industrial Classification of 1993. The Standard Industrial Classification of 1974 broke down the machinery industry into nine sectors:

- Agricultural machine industry
- Metalworking Machine - Industry and machine tool factories
- Manufacturers of machinery and equipment for the food, chemical and allied industries
- Manufacturers of machinery and equipment for the rubber and plastics
- Manufacturers of gears, gearing and driving elements
- Manufacturers of machinery and equipment and wood furniture etc.
- Manufacturers of steam boiler, and power tools industry
- Office machinery industry
- Other machinery and equipment industry

It may be clear that classification is by markets, and the more recent classification is by product.

== Products of the machine industry ==
The machine industry is a diverse industry, and some of the things they produce are shown below:

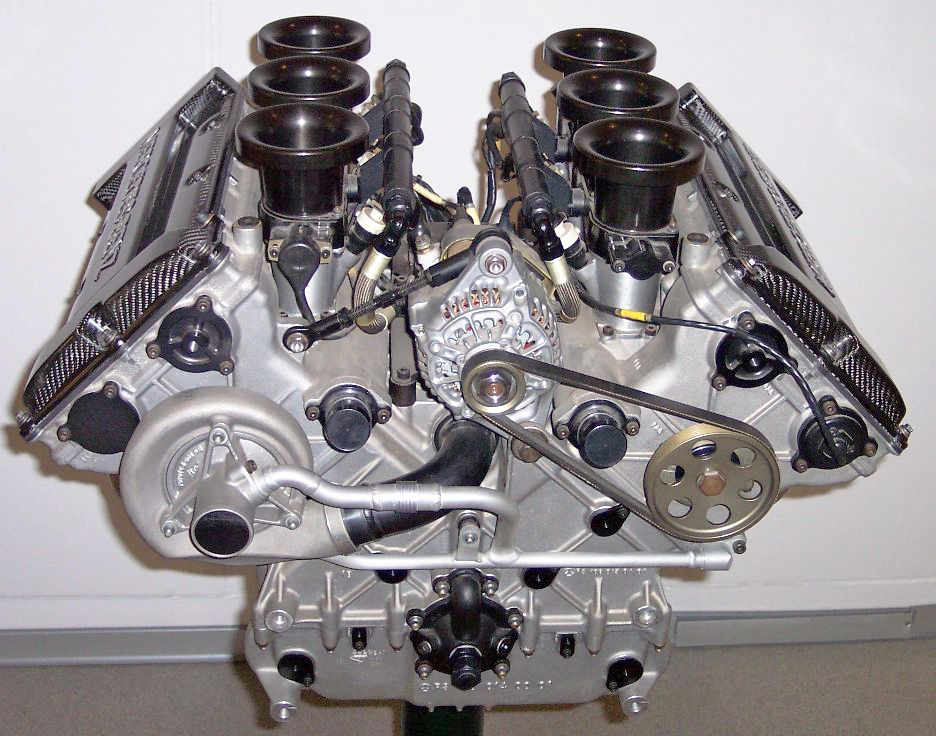
Engine

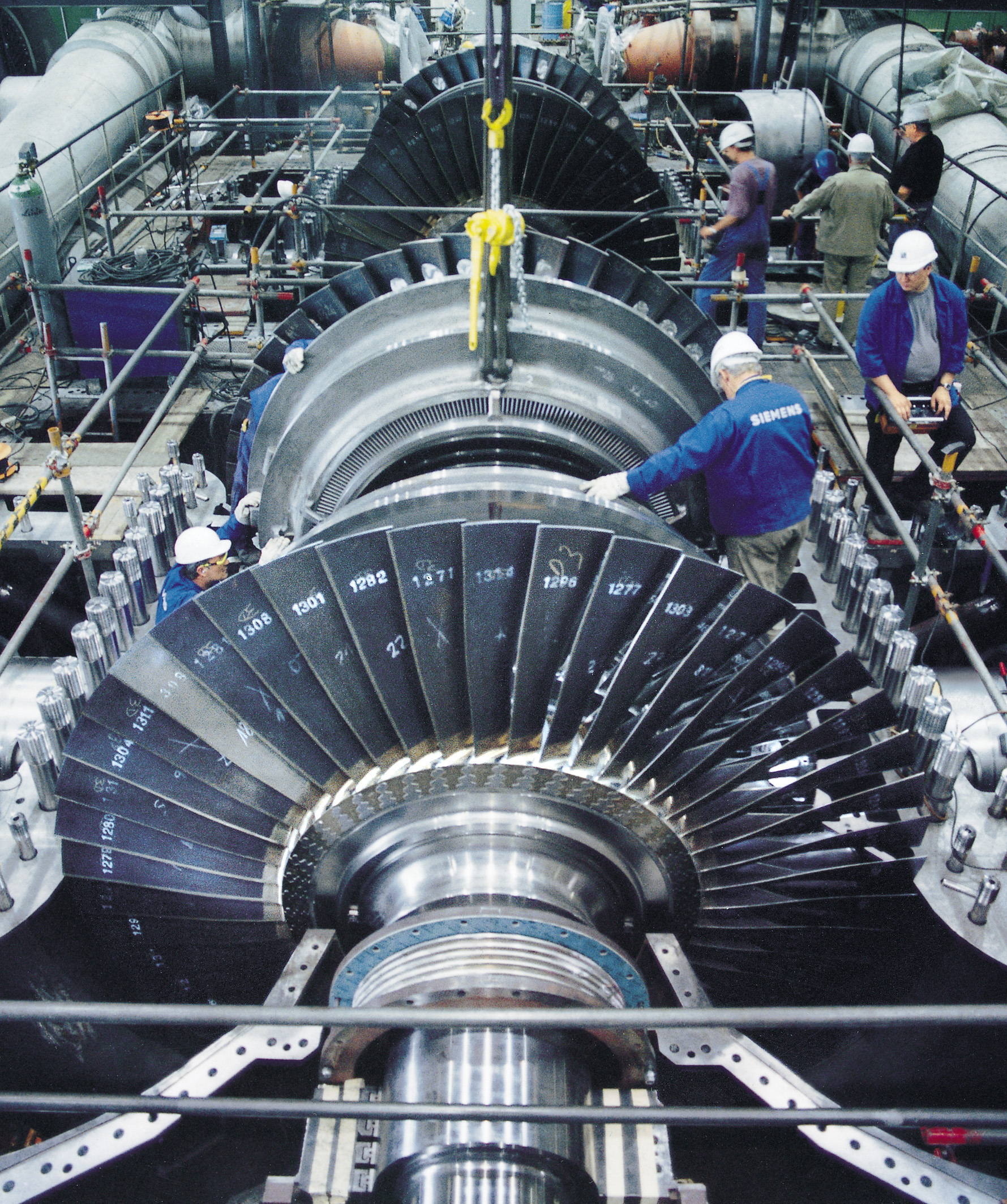
Steam turbine

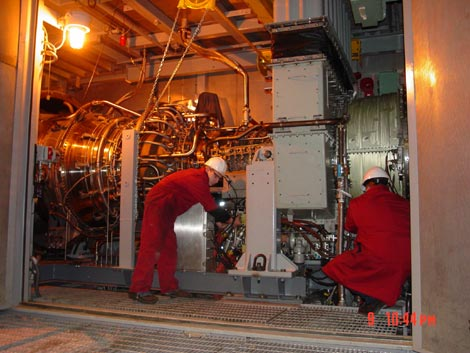
Gas turbine

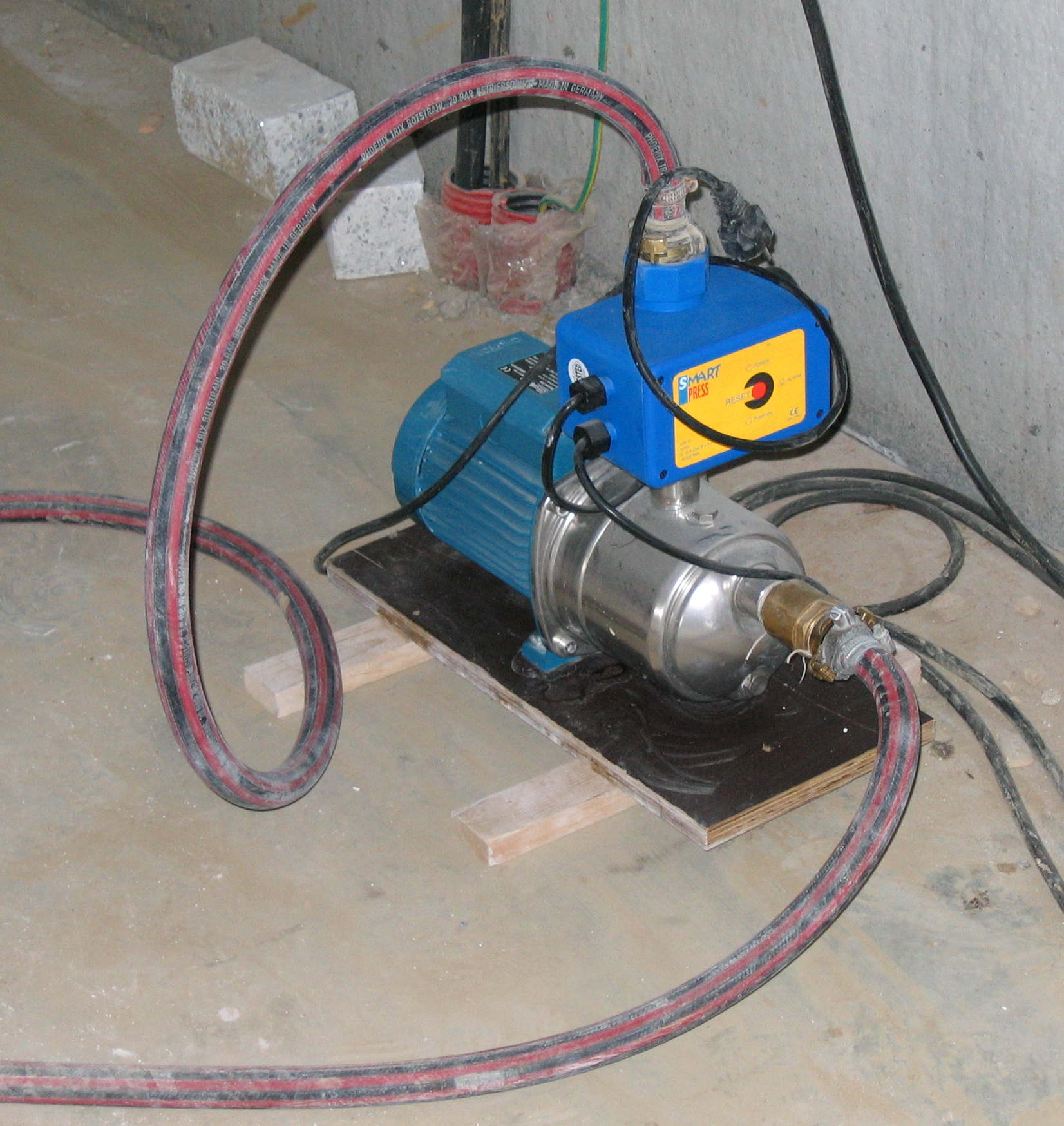
Pump

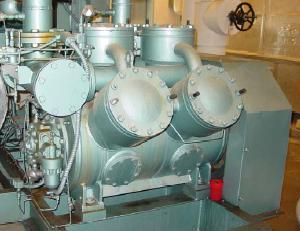
Compressor

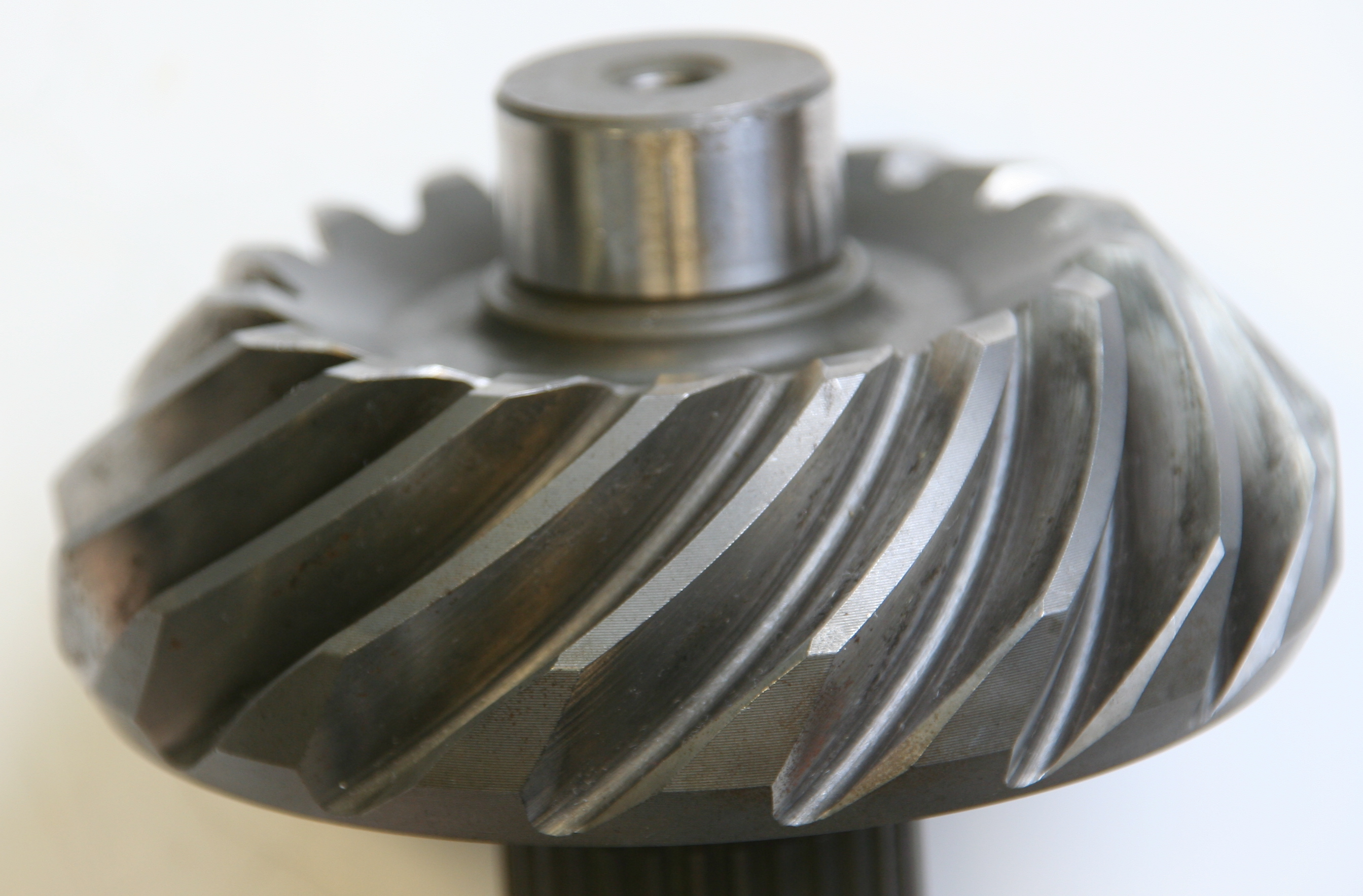
Gear

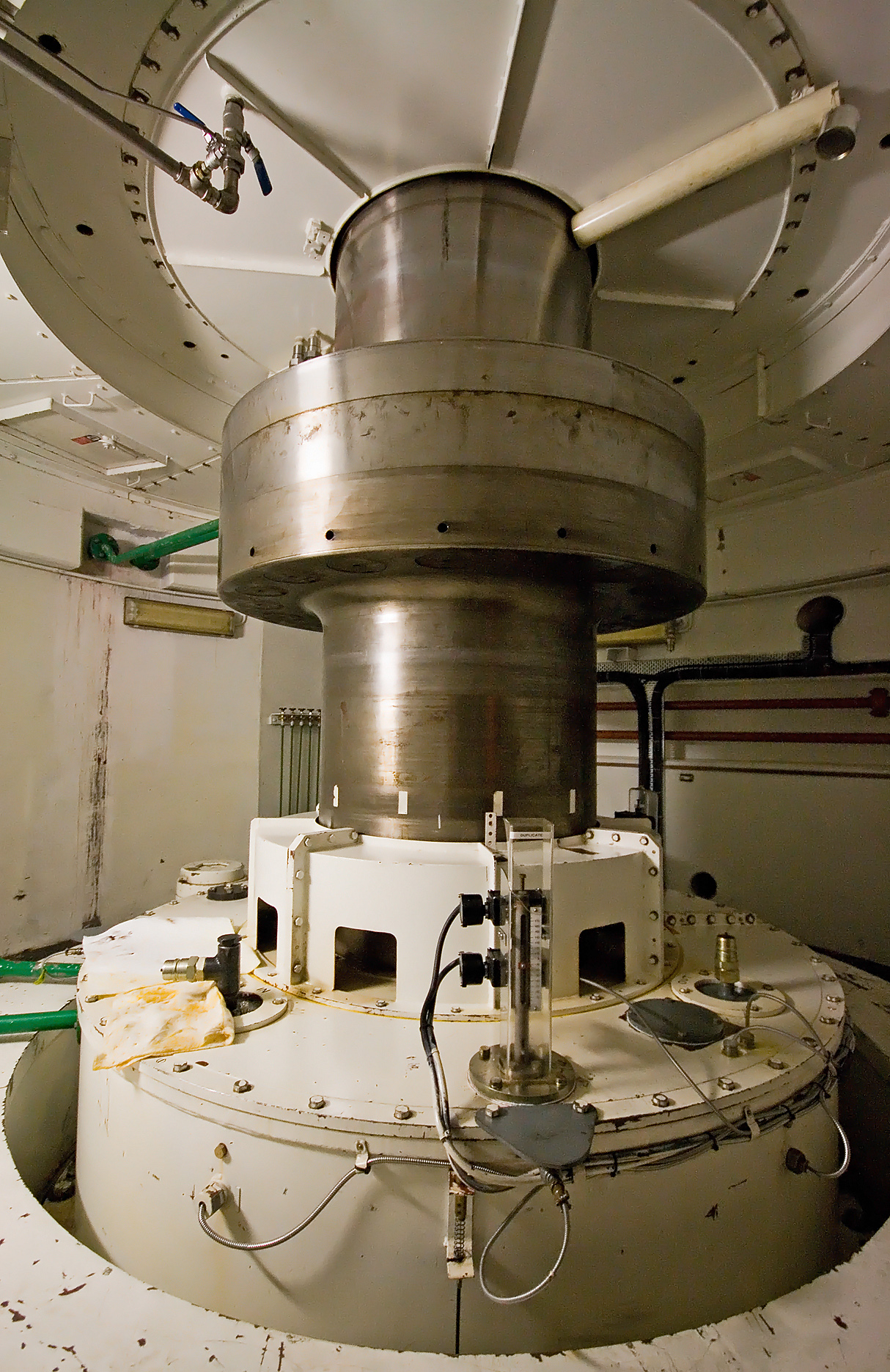
Bearing of a gas turbine

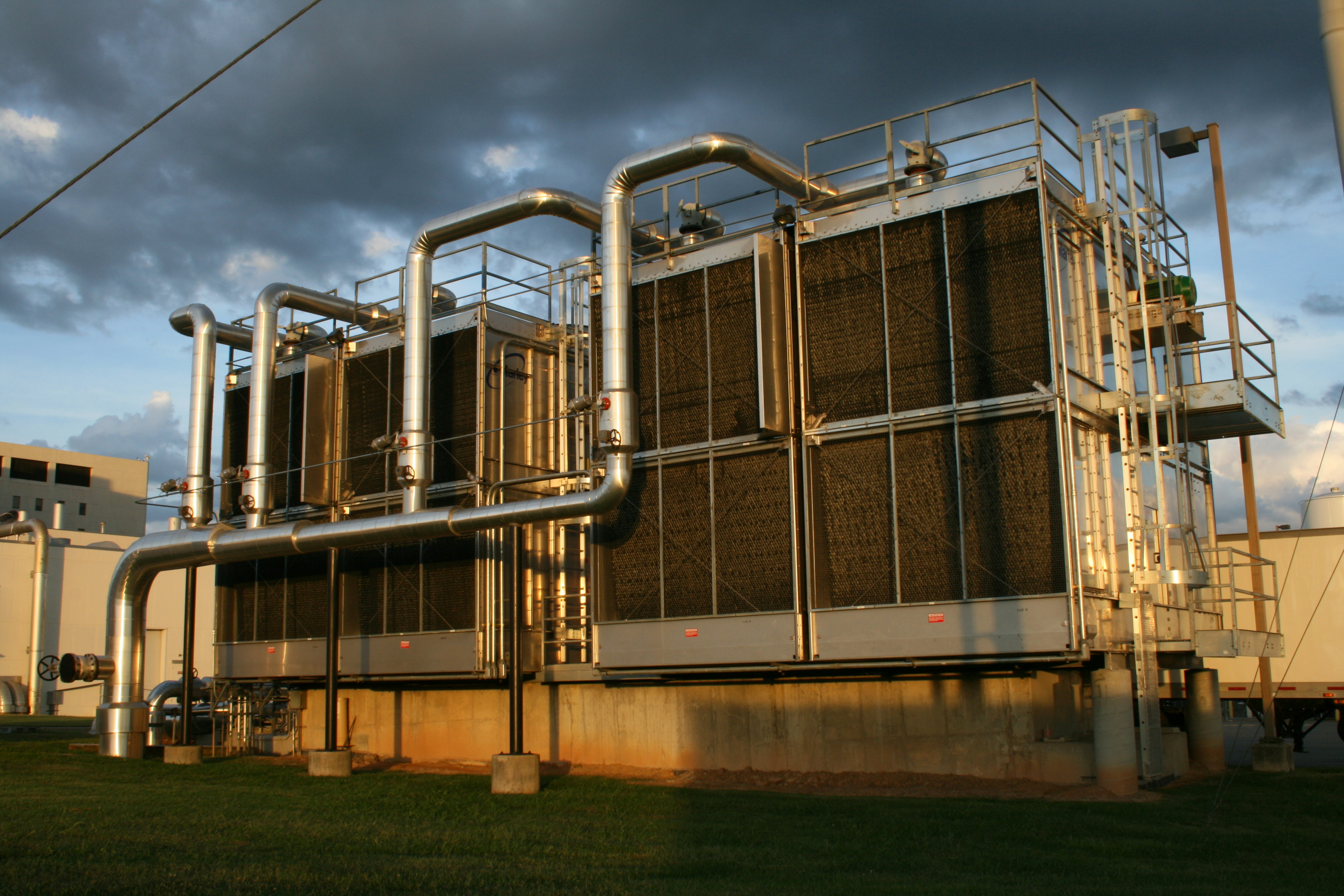
Climate control (of a hospital)

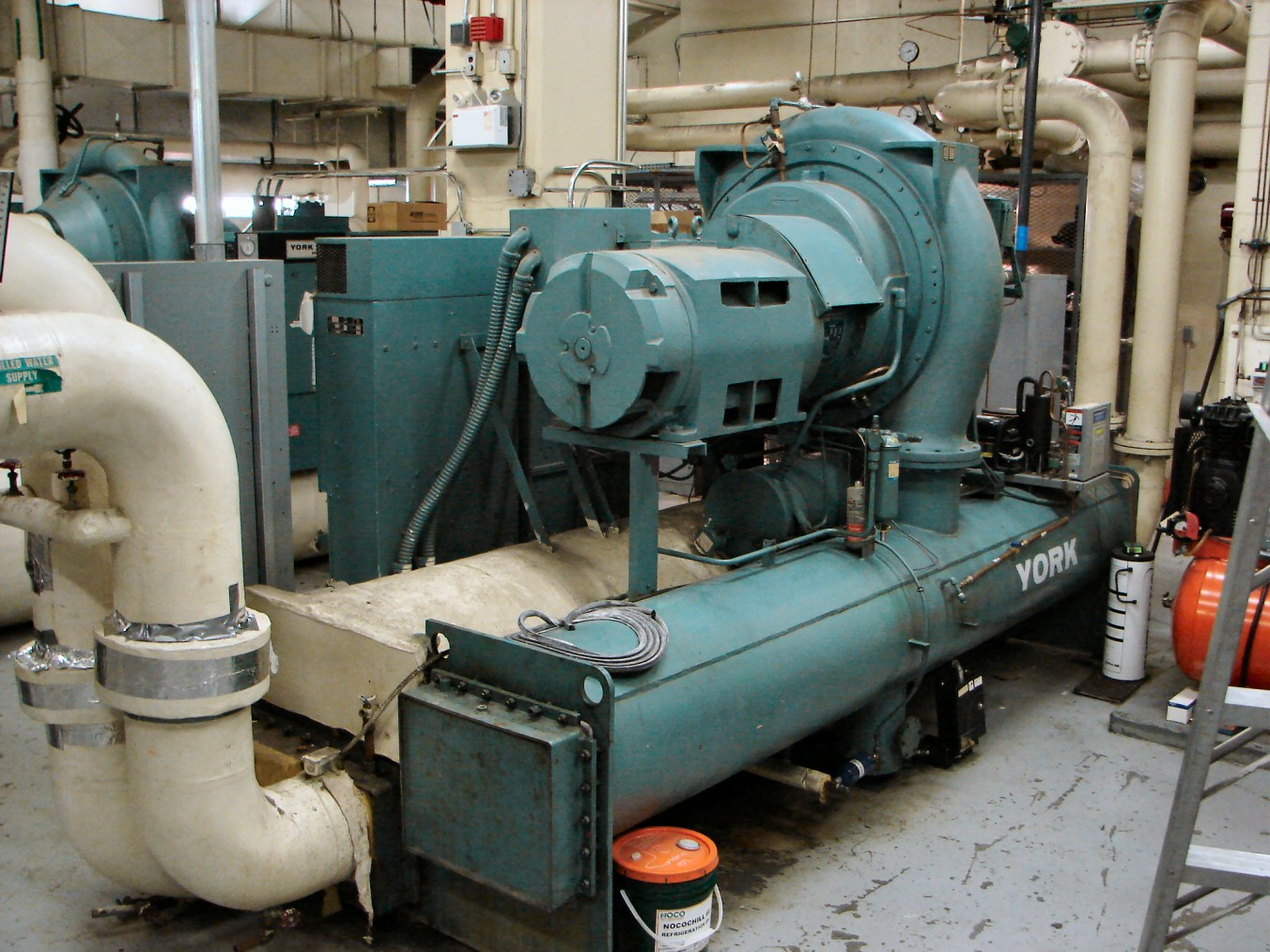
Cooling system

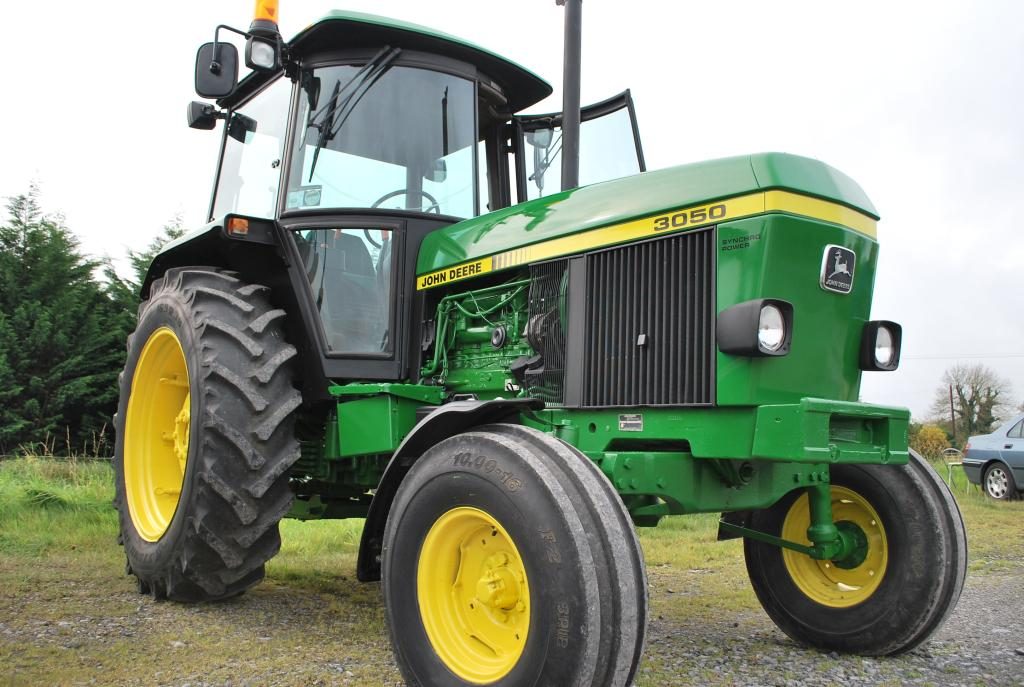
Tractor

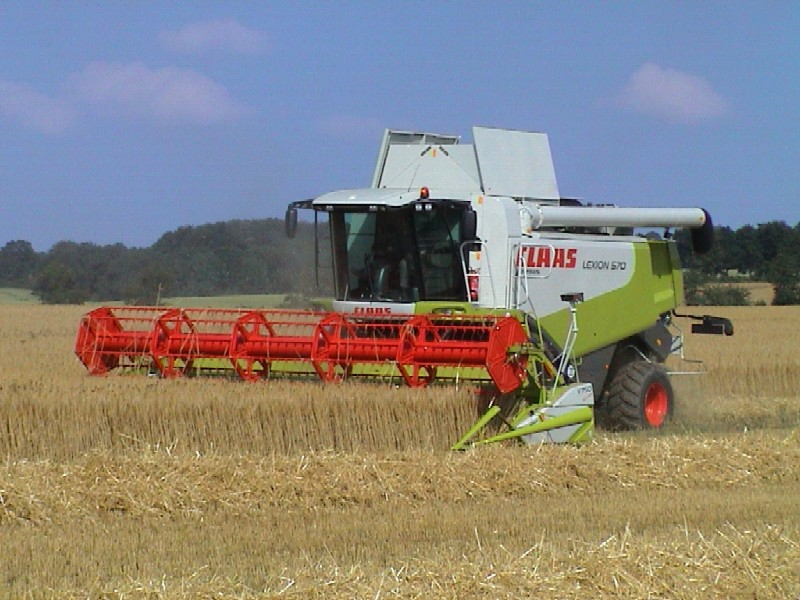
Agricultural machinery

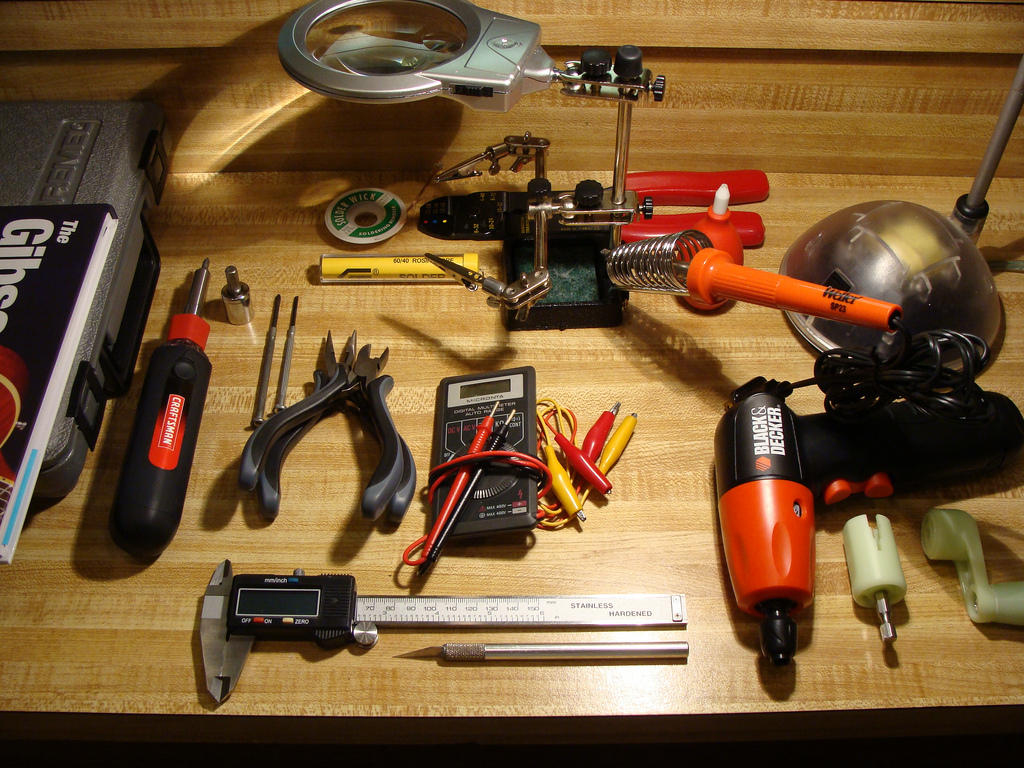
Small tools

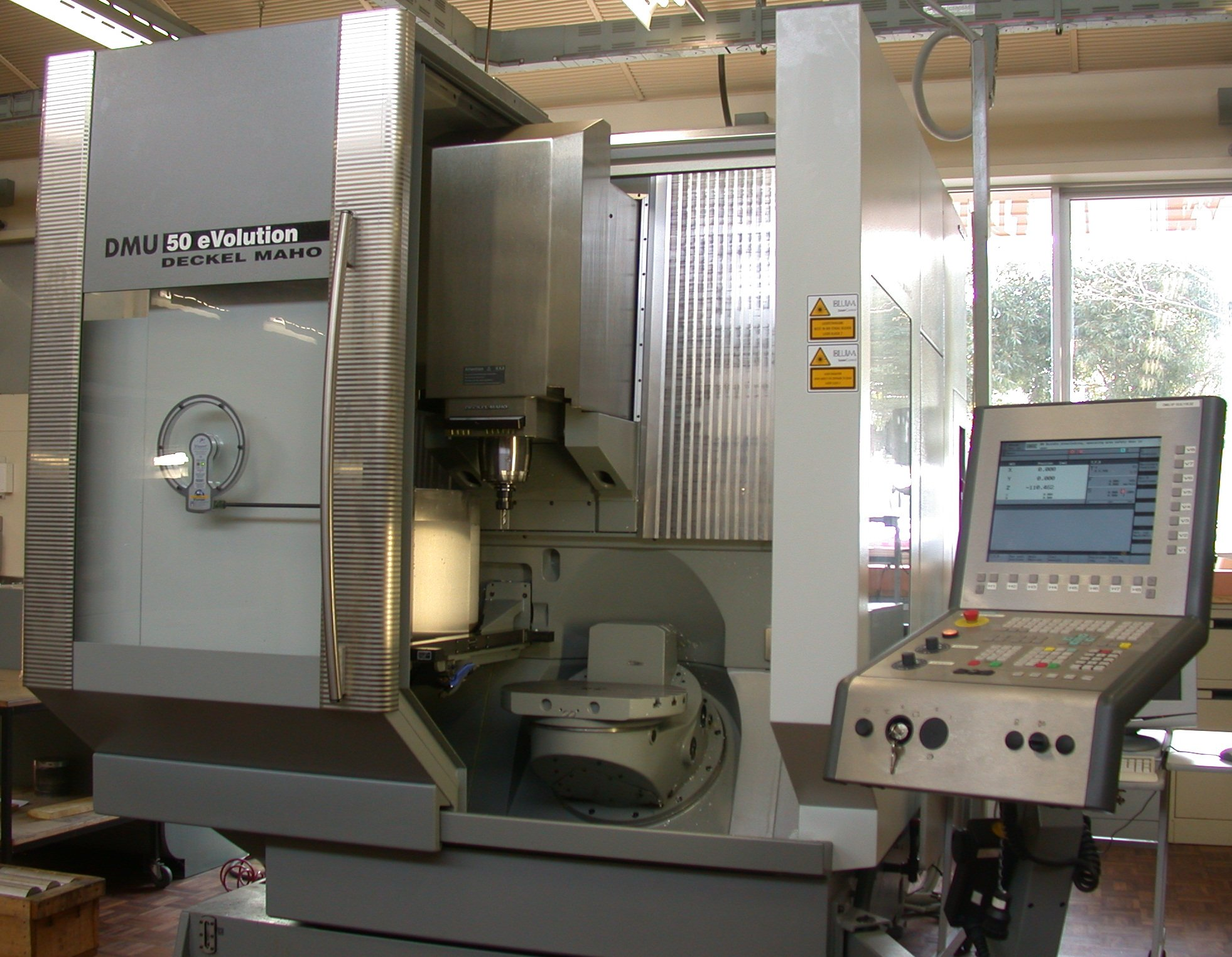
Machine tool

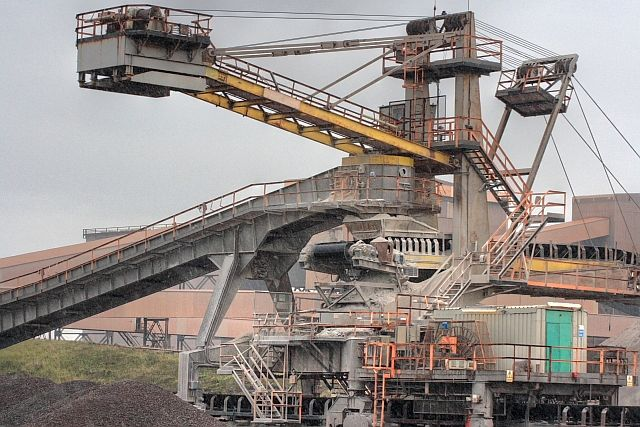
Machine for mineral extraction

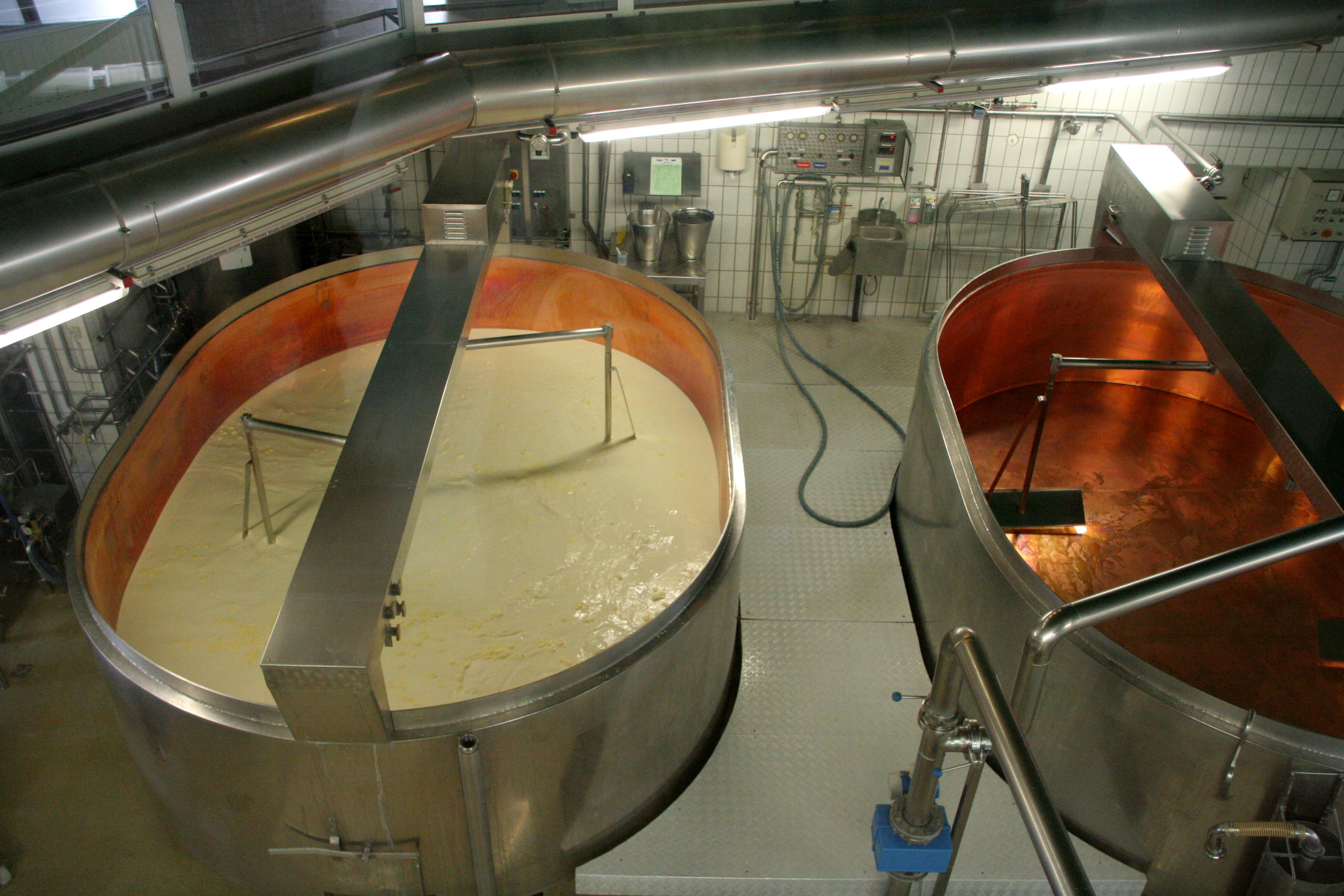
Machines for food industry

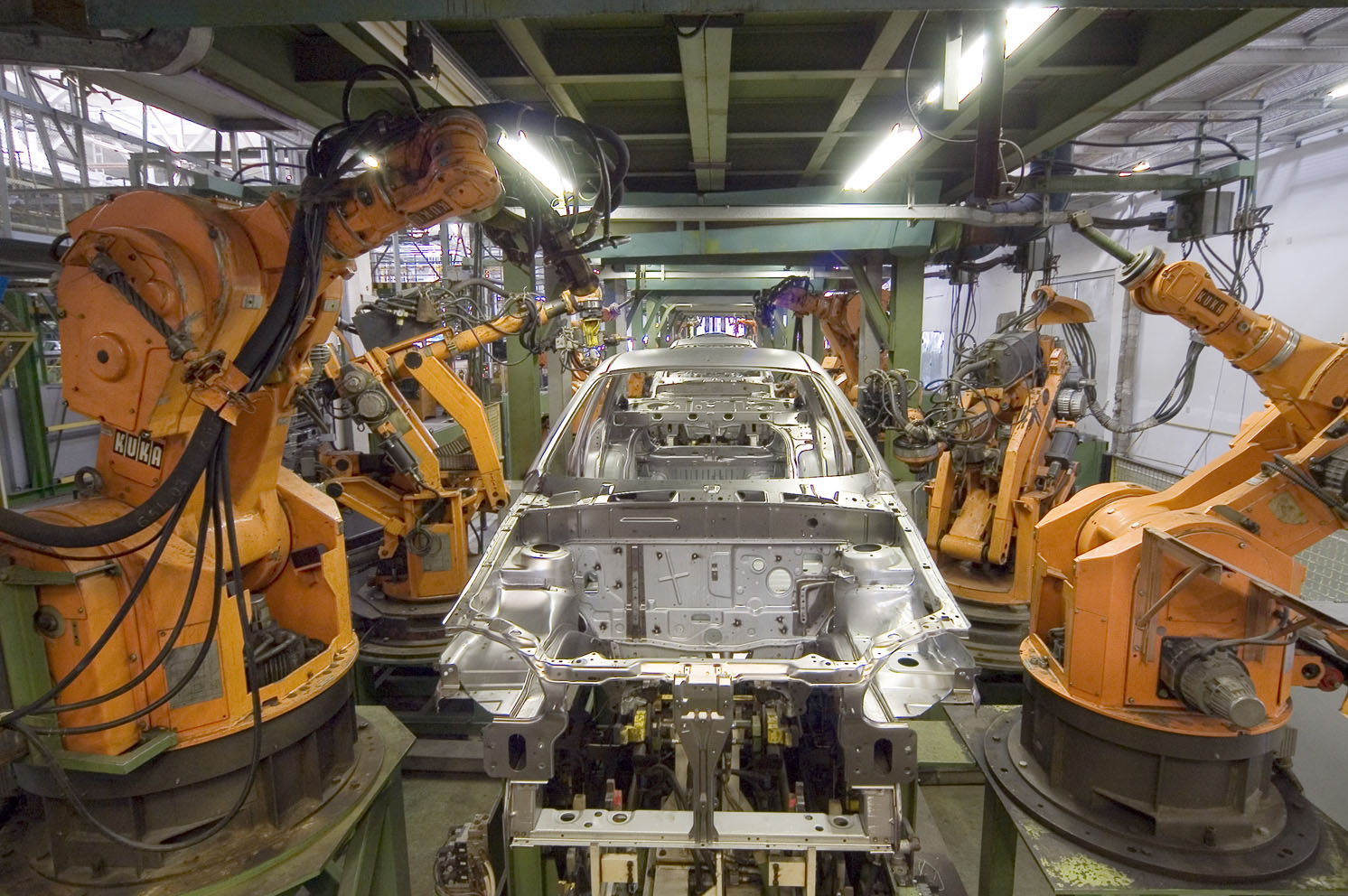
Industrial robots

== Machine industry in different countries ==
=== ASEAN ===
In ASEAN, the machine industry is a vital part of the region's economic structure. As of 2023, the industry employed approximately 2.5 million people across member countries. The sector generated a combined turnover of around $120 billion, with about 65% of this revenue coming from exports.

The ASEAN region is home to roughly 12,000 active companies in the machine industry, with the majority being small and medium-sized enterprises. Around 90% of these companies employ fewer than 500 people. On average, each employee in this sector generates approximately $48,000 in revenue annually.

Prominent companies in the ASEAN machine industry include ST Engineering (Singapore), Aikawa Iron Works (Thailand), and San Miguel Corporation (Philippines). The industry's significant growth can be attributed to favorable macroeconomic policies, open trade regimes, and increasing demand for manufactured goods both within the region and globally.

ASEAN's machine industry has been significantly influenced by advancements in automation and digital infrastructure, contributing to increased productivity and competitiveness on a global scale

=== Germany ===
In Germany, in 2011 about 900,000 people were employed in the machine industry and an estimated 300,000 abroad. The combined turnover of the sector was €238 billion, of which 60% came from export. There were about 6,600 active companies, and 95% of those companies employed less than 500 people. Each employee generated an average of 148,000 Euro. Some of the largest companies in Germany are DMG Mori Seiki AG, GEA Group, Siemens AG, and ThyssenKrupp.

=== France ===
In the French machinery industry in 2009 about 650,000 people were employed, and the sector generated a turnover of 44 billion euros. Because of the crisis, the turnover of the sector had fallen by 15 percent. Due to stronger consumer spending and continuing demand from the energy sector and transport sector, the damage of the crisis was still limited. Alternatively, some companies decided to focus their request on used industrial equipment. This guarantee attractive prices and better time delivery.

=== Japan ===
In Japan, the machine industry plays a significant role in the economy, employing a considerable number of people and generating substantial revenue. As of 2023, approximately 1.5 million people were employed in the machine tool industry. The combined turnover of the sector was estimated to be around $60 billion, with about 70% of the revenue coming from exports.

Japan is home to about 3,000 active companies in the machine industry, with 85% of these companies employing fewer than 500 people. The average revenue generated per employee in the industry is approximately $40,000. Some of the largest and most influential companies in Japan's machine industry include Fanuc Corporation, Mitsubishi Electric Corporation, and DMG Mori Seiki Co., Ltd.

=== The Netherlands ===
In the Netherlands in 1996, a total of some 93,000 workers were employed in the machinery industry, with approximately 2,500 companies present. In 1000 of these companies there were working 20 or more employees. In the Netherlands, according to the Chamber of Commerce in this subsector of the industry in 2011 some 15,000 companies were active. Some of the largest companies in the Netherlands are Lely, Philips and Stork B.V.

=== United States ===
U.S. machinery industries had total domestic and foreign sales of $413.7 billion in 2011. The United States is the world’s largest market for machinery, as well as the third-largest supplier. American manufacturers held a 58.5 percent share of the U.S. domestic market.

== See also ==
- Outline of industrial machinery
- Automotive industry
- Machine factory
- Machine shop
- Machine tool
- Machine tool builder
