= Burgmaster =

American machine tool manufacturer

- Formerly: Burg Tool Manufacturing Company
- Type: Private (1946–1965); Division of Houdaille Industries (1965–1985)
- Industry: Machine tools Industrial manufacturing
- Founded: 1946 in Los Angeles, California, U.S.
- Founders: Fred Burg; Joe Burg; Norman Ginsburg
- Defunct: 1986
- Fate: Liquidated by parent, brand acquired and merged by Vulcan to create Mastrex
- Successor: Mastrex (2026)
- Headquarters: Gardena, California, United States
- Area served: Worldwide
- Key people: Fred Burg (chairman); Joe Burg (president); Norman Ginsburg (manufacturing)
- Products: Turret drilling machines Tapping machines NC machining centers
- Revenue: US$9.6 million (1965)
- Number of employees: 275 (1965)
- Parent: Houdaille Industries (1965–1985)

Burgmaster, also known as Burg Tool Manufacturing Company, was an American machine tool manufacturer based in Los Angeles, California. It produced turret drilling and tapping machines that were widely used in industrial manufacturing during the mid-twentieth century, and at its peak was the largest American machine tool builder west of the Mississippi River.

In 2025, Vulcan acquired Burgmaster brand and merged it with itself to form Mastrex.

== History ==
=== 1946–1965: Early history ===
Burgmaster was founded in 1946 as the Burg Tool Manufacturing Company by Fred Burg with his son, Joe Burg, and son-in-law, Norman Ginsburg. Fred G. Burg was born in Czechoslovakia emigrated to the United States in 1911 and initially worked as a lathe operator at an International Harvester plant before joining his in-laws' dry-goods business. In 1943, Burg relocated his family from Chicago to Los Angeles to return to mechanical work amid the wartime industrial expansion in Southern California. Shortly after arriving, he patented a precision tool-holding device known as the Tool-flex and began manufacturing it out of his garage.

Burgmaster's first product was a six-spindle turret drill, a machine that allowed operators to switch between drill sizes by rotating a turret, replacing the row of separate drill presses typically used in mass production. The first production unit was sold in late 1946 to Beckman Instruments, a manufacturer of precision scientific instruments then based in Pasadena.

In the 1950s, during the Korean War, demand for its tools increased when defense manufacturers sought equipment that could reduce production time and costs. In 1954, Burg Tool built a factory at a cost of US$70,000.

During the 1950s and 1960s, Burgmaster began producing automated metalworking machines, including equipment incorporating elements of numerical control. During the 1950s and early 1960s, the company expanded into automated metalworking machines that had elements of numerical control (NC).

=== 1965–1986: Acquisition by Houdaille Industries, leveraged buyout, and liquidation ===
In October 1965, Burgmaster was acquired by Houdaille Industries. Following the acquisition, Burgmaster became a Houdaille division and operated from a new plant in Gardena, California. Under Houdaille's centralized financial management, layers of accountants and managers were introduced who were unfamiliar with machine-tool production, and shop-floor foremen lost their traditional role in production planning. Beginning in 1967, parts production for some smaller Burgmaster models was transferred to McMinnville, Tennessee, reducing the integration of design and manufacturing.

In 1979, Houdaille was acquired in a leveraged buyout (LBO) by the private equity firm Kohlberg Kravis Roberts (KKR), in what is widely regarded as one of the first large LBOs in U.S. corporate history. KKR took Houdaille private at US$40 per share, with more than 80 percent of the purchase price financed through high-yield debt. The resulting debt burden, which Burgmaster and other Houdaille subsidiaries were required to service, intensified pressure on operating divisions to maximize short-term cash flow.

By the early 1980s, Burgmaster faced increasing competition from Japanese machine tool builders such as Yamazaki, which had earlier obtained a technology license from Burgmaster. In 1982, Houdaille petitioned the U.S. government for trade protection against Japanese imports under tariff law, seeking to deny foreign tax credits to Japanese machine tool builders. Although the petition advanced through the United States Congress, President Ronald Reagan declined to act on it in 1983. On September 24, 1985, Houdaille announced a corporate restructuring that included the liquidation of most of its machine tool group. On October 1, 1985, Burgmaster plant in Gardena was closed. Burgmaster ceased operations later that month, and the contents of the Gardena plant were sold at public auction on January 15, 1986.

== Products ==
Burgmaster's primary products were turret drilling and tapping machines intended for production environments. These machines were used for drilling, tapping, and related operations in multi-stage manufacturing processes.

== See also ==
- Manufacturing in the United States
