= Turret =

Turret may refer to:

- Turret (architecture), a small tower that projects above the wall of a building
- Gun turret, a mechanism of a projectile-firing weapon
- Objective turret, an indexable holder of multiple lenses in an optical microscope
- Missile turret, a device for aiming missiles towards their intended target before launch
- The Turret, a headland in Antarctica
- Trading turret, a specialised telephony key system
- Turret (anatomy), an element of the anatomy of a turret sponge
- Turret (character), a character in the television series Dino-Riders
- Turret (electronics), an element of a turret board that is soldered to electronic components to complete a circuit layout
- Turret (superstructure), an element in the design of turret deck ships
- Turret (toolholder), an indexable holder of multiple tools
  - Turret lathe, a lathe with a turret toolholder
- Turret (Hadrian's Wall), one of a series of watchtowers

== See also ==
- It-Turretta (disambiguation)
- Tourette (disambiguation)
