= Tourette (disambiguation) =

Tourette's, or Tourette syndrome, is a neurodevelopmental disorder.

Tourette, Tourettes, or Tourrettes may also refer to:

- Georges Gilles de la Tourette (1857–1904), French neurologist who described the syndrome

== Music ==
- Tourettes (band), a heavy metal band
- "tourette's", a 1993 song by Nirvana from In Utero

== Places ==
- Tourrettes, Var, a commune in southeastern France
- La Tourette, a commune in central France

== Other uses ==
- Touret, a type of medieval veil or headdress
- Tourette (automobile) a three-wheel microcar
- Tourette, a character in Vampire: The Masquerade – Bloodlines

== People with the surname ==
- Donny Tourette (born 1985), of the band Towers of London

== See also ==
- "Le Petit Tourette", an episode of South Park
- Turret (disambiguation)
