= Biflex Products Corporation =

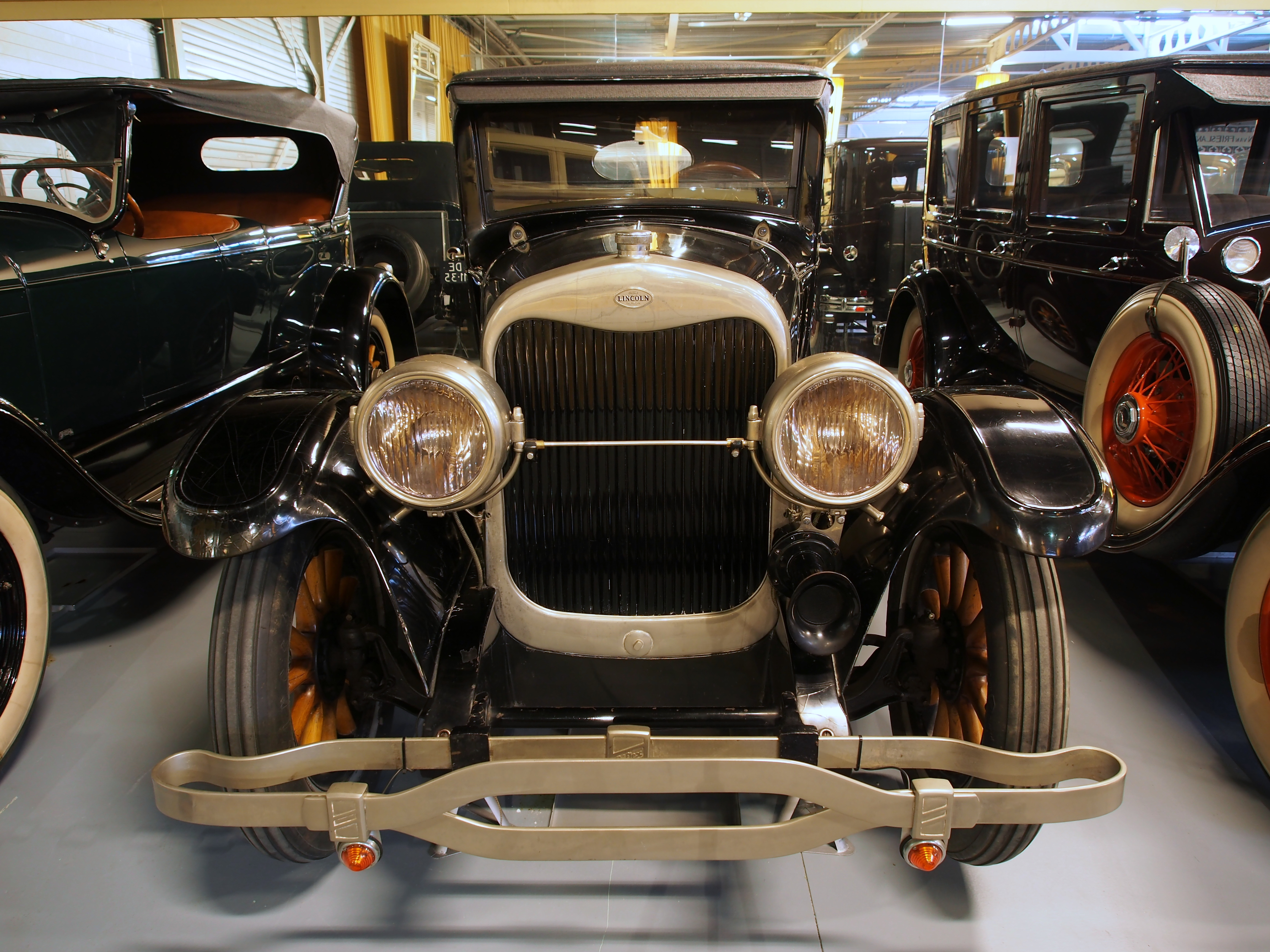
BiFlex front bumper on a 1924 Lincoln Model L.

Biflex Products Corporation was a Winnetka, Illinois based manufacturer of automobile bumpers. In July 1923 the company was listed as a co-conspirator with American Chain Company of New York City in an effort to restrain trade and restrict interstate commerce. A lawsuit in United States Federal Court sought to prevent American Chain Company from acquiring a monopoly in the sales of automobile bumpers. The effort to restrain trade began prior to January 1, 1920

80% of the common stock of Biflex Products Corporation was acquired by General Spring Bumper Corporation of Detroit, Michigan in March 1929. Biflex Products Corporation maintained its corporate identity. By August 1931 Biflex Products Corporation was a subsidiary of Houdaille-Hershey Corporation.

Two Biflex Products Corporation plants were sold to Oakes Products Corporation at a receivership sale in Wilmington, Delaware on November 4, 1935. The manufacturing sites were located in Decatur, Illinois and North Chicago, Illinois. The purchase prices were $50,000 and $90,000 respectively.
