= Machine tool builder =

Corporation or person that builds machine tools

A machine tool builder is a corporation or person that builds machine tools, usually for sale to manufacturers, who use them to manufacture products. A machine tool builder runs a machine factory, which is part of the machine industry.

The machine tools often make interchangeable parts, which are assembled into subassemblies or finished assemblies, ending up sold to consumers, either directly or through other businesses at intermediate links of a value-adding chain. Alternatively, the machine tools may help make molds or dies, which then make the parts for the assemblies.

== Overview ==
The term "machine tool builder" implies a company that builds machine tools for sale to other companies, who then use them to manufacture subsequent products. Macroeconomically, machine tools are only means to ends (with the ends being the manufactured products); they are not the ends themselves. Thus it is in the nature of machine tools that there is a spectrum of relationships between their builders, their users, and the end users of the products that they make.

There is always natural potential for the machine tool users to be the same people as the builders, or to be different people who occupy an intermediate position in the value stream. Markets often have some proclivity for circumventing such a position, although the proclivity is often not absolute. Every variant on the spectrum of relationships has found some instances of empirical embodiment; and over the centuries, trends can be seen for which variants predominated in each era, as described below.

Machine tool builders tend not to be in the business of using the machine tools to manufacture the subsequent products (although exceptions, including chaebol and keiretsu, do exist); and product manufacturers tend not to be in the business of building machine tools. In fact, many machine tool builders are not even in the business of building the control system (typically CNC) that animates the machine; and makers of controls tend not to be in the machine building business (or to inhabit only specialized niches within it).

For example, FANUC and Siemens make controls that are sold to many machine tool builders. Each segment tends to find that crossing into other segments involves becoming a conglomerate of dissimilar businesses, which is an execution headache that they don't need as long as focusing on a narrower field is often more profitable in net effect anyway. This trend can be compared to the trend in which companies choose not to compete against their own distributors. Thus a software company may have an online store, but that store does not undercut the distributors' stores on price.

== History ==
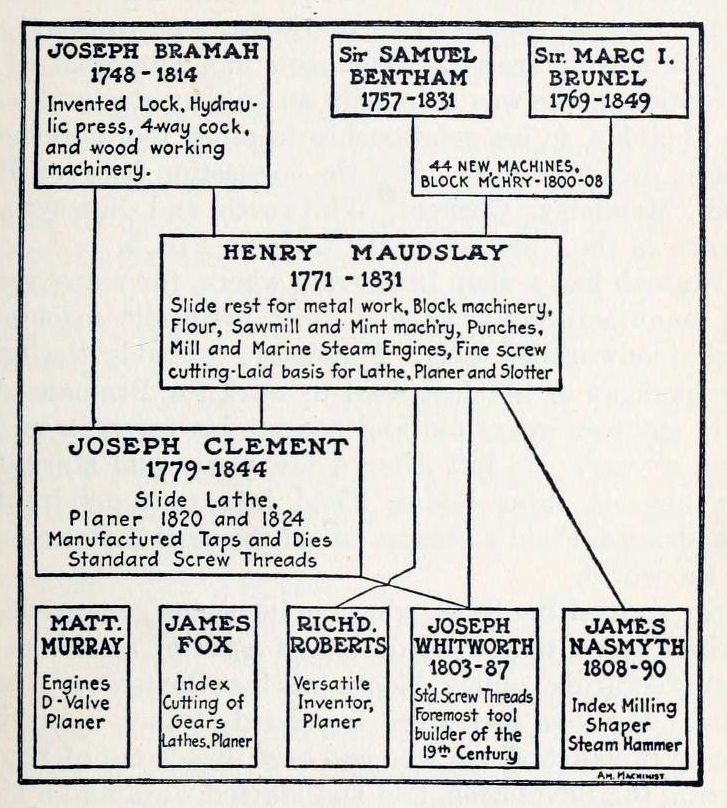
Genealogy of the Early English Tool Builders, 1915

The machine tool industry began gradually in the early nineteenth century with individual toolmakers who innovated in machine tool design and building. The ones that history remembers best include Henry Maudslay, Joseph Whitworth, Joseph Clement, James Nasmyth, Matthew Murray, Elisha K. Root, Frederick W. Howe, Stephen Fitch, J.D. Alvord, Frederick W. Howe, Richard S. Lawrence, Henry D. Stone, Christopher M. Spencer, Amos Whitney, and Francis A. Pratt.

The industry then grew into the earliest corporate builders such as Brown & Sharpe, the Warner & Swasey Company, and the original Pratt & Whitney company. In all of these cases, there were product manufacturers who started building machine tools to suit their own inhouse needs, and eventually found that machine tools had become product lines in their own right. (In cases such as B&S and P&W, they became the main or sole product lines.)

In contrast, Colt and Ford are good examples of product manufacturers that made significant advances in machine tool building while serving their own inhouse needs, but never became "machine tool builders" in the sense of having machine tools become the products that they sold. National-Acme was an example of a manufacturer and a machine tool builder merging into one company and selling both the machines and the products that they made (screw machines and fasteners). Hyundai and Mitsubishi are chaebol and keiretsu conglomerates (respectively), and their interests cover from ore mine to end user (in actuality if not always nominally).

Until the 1970s, machine tool builder corporations could generally be said to have nationality, and thus it made sense to talk about an American machine tool builder, a German one, or a Japanese one. Since the 1970s, the industry has globalized to the point that assigning nationality to the corporations becomes progressively more meaningless as one travels down the timeline leading up to the present day; currently, most machine tool builders are (or are subsidiaries of) multinational corporations or conglomerates. With these companies it is enough to say "multinational corporation based in country X", "multinational corporation founded in country X", etc. Subcategories such as "American machine tool builders" or "Japanese machine tool builders" would be senseless because, for example, companies like Hardinge and Yamazaki Mazak today have significant operations in many countries.

== Trade associations ==
Machine tool builders have long had trade associations, which have helped with such tasks as establishing industry standards, lobbying (of legislatures and, more often, import-and-export-regulating agencies), and training programs. For example, the National Machine Tool Builders' Association (NMTBA) was the trade association of U.S. machine tool builders for many decades, and it helped establish standards such as the NMTB machine taper series (which made toolholders interchangeable between the different brands of machine on a typical machine shop floor). It has since been merged into the Association for Manufacturing Technology (AMT). Other examples have included CECIMO (European Machine Tool Industry Association), the UK's ABMTM, MTTA, and MTA, and the Japan Machine Tool Builders' Association (JMTBA).

Just as machine tool builders have long had trade associations, so have machine tool distributors (dealers). Examples have been the American Machine Tool Distributors’ Association (AMTDA) and the Japan Machine Tool Trade Association (JMTTA). In recent decades the builders' and distributors' associations have cooperated on shared interests to the extent that some of them have merged. For example, the former NMTBA and AMTDA have merged into the AMT.

== Trade shows ==
Major trade shows of the industry include IMTS (International Manufacturing Technology Show, formerly called the International Machine Tool Show), EMO (French Exposition Mondiale de la Machine Outil, English "Machine Tool World Exposition") and BIEMH (Spanish Bienal Internacional de Máquina-Herramienta). There are also many smaller trade shows concentrating on specific geographical regions (for example, the Western US, the mid-Atlantic US, the Ruhr Valley, or the Tokyo region) or on specific industries (such as shows tailored especially to the moldmaking industry).

== Historical studies of machine tool building ==
In the early 20th century, Joseph Wickham Roe wrote a seminal classic of machine tool history, English and American Tool Builders (1916), which is extensively cited by later works. About 20 years later Roe published a biography of James Hartness (1937) that also contains some general history of the industry. In 1947, Fred H. Colvin published a memoir, Sixty Years with Men and Machines, that contains quite a bit of general history of the industry.

L. T. C. Rolt's 1965 monograph, A Short History of Machine Tools, is a widely read classic, as are the series of monographs that Robert S. Woodbury published during the 1960s, which were collected into a volume in 1972 as Studies in the History of Machine Tools.

In 1970, Wayne R. Moore wrote about the Moore family firm, the Moore Special Tool Company, who independently invented the jig borer (contemporaneously with its Swiss invention). Moore's monograph, Foundations of Mechanical Accuracy, is a seminal classic of the principles of machine tool design and construction that yield the highest possible accuracy and precision in machine tools (second only to that of metrological machines). The Moore firm epitomized the art and science of the tool and die maker.

David F. Noble's Forces of Production (1984) is one of the most detailed histories of the machine tool industry from World War II through the early 1980s, relayed in the context of the social impact of evolving automation via NC and CNC. Also in 1984, David A. Hounshell published From the American System to Mass Production, one of the most detailed histories of the machine tool industry from the late 18th century through 1932. It does not concentrate on listing firm names and sales statistics (which Floud's 1976 monograph focuses on) but rather is extremely detailed in exploring the development and spread of practicable interchangeability, and the thinking behind the intermediate steps. It is extensively cited by later works.

In 1989, Holland published a history, When the Machine Stopped, that is most specifically about Burgmaster (which specialized in turret drills); but in telling Burgmaster's story, and that of its acquirer Houdaille, Holland provides a history of the machine tool industry in general between World War II and the 1980s that ranks with Noble's coverage of the same era (Noble 1984) as a seminal history. It was later republished under the title From Industry to Alchemy.

== See also ==
- Machine industry
- Machine factory
- Machine tool
- Machine tool builders

== Bibliography ==
- Colvin, Fred H. (1947), Sixty Years with Men and Machines, New York and London: McGraw-Hill, LCCN 47003762. Available as a reprint from Lindsay Publications (ISBN 978-0-917914-86-7). Foreword by Ralph Flanders.
- Floud, Roderick C. (2006) [1976], The British Machine Tool Industry, 1850-1914, Cambridge, England: Cambridge University Press, ISBN 978-0-521-02555-3, LCCN 2006275684, OCLC 70251252.
- Holland, Max (1989), When the Machine Stopped: A Cautionary Tale from Industrial America, Boston: Harvard Business School Press, ISBN 978-0-87584-208-0, OCLC 246343673.
- Hounshell, David A. (1984), From the American System to Mass Production, 1800–1932: The Development of Manufacturing Technology in the United States, Baltimore, Maryland: Johns Hopkins University Press, ISBN 978-0-8018-2975-8, LCCN 83016269, OCLC 1104810110
- Moore, Wayne R. (1970), Foundations of Mechanical Accuracy (1st ed.), Bridgeport, Connecticut, US: Moore Special Tool Co., LCCN 73127307.
- Noble, David F. (1984), Forces of Production: A Social History of Industrial Automation, New York, New York, US: Knopf, ISBN 978-0-394-51262-4, LCCN 83048867.
- Roe, Joseph Wickham (1916), English and American Tool Builders, New Haven, Connecticut: Yale University Press, LCCN 16011753. Reprinted by McGraw-Hill, New York and London, 1926 (LCCN 27-24075); and by Lindsay Publications, Inc., Bradley, Illinois (ISBN 978-0-917914-73-7).
- Roe, Joseph Wickham (1937), James Hartness: A Representative of the Machine Age at Its Best, New York: American Society of Mechanical Engineers, LCCN 37016470, OCLC 3456642. link from HathiTrust.
- Rolt, L. T. C. (1965), A Short History of Machine Tools, Cambridge, Massachusetts, USA: MIT Press, OCLC 250074. Co-edition published as Rolt, L. T. C. (1965), Tools for the Job: a Short History of Machine Tools, London: B. T. Batsford, LCCN 65080822.
- Rose, William (1990), Cleveland: the making of a city, Kent State University Press, ISBN 978-0-87338-428-5
- Jerome, Harry (1934), "Mechanization in Industry", NBER, Cambridge, Massachusetts, US: US National Bureau of Economic Research.
- Ryder, Thomas and Son, Machines to Make Machines 1865 to 1968, a centenary booklet, (Derby: Bemrose & Sons, 1968)
- Woodbury, Robert S. (1972), Studies in the History of Machine Tools, Cambridge, Massachusetts, US, and London, England: MIT Press, ISBN 978-0-262-73033-4, LCCN 72006354
