= Ralph Peo =

American industrialist (1897-1966)

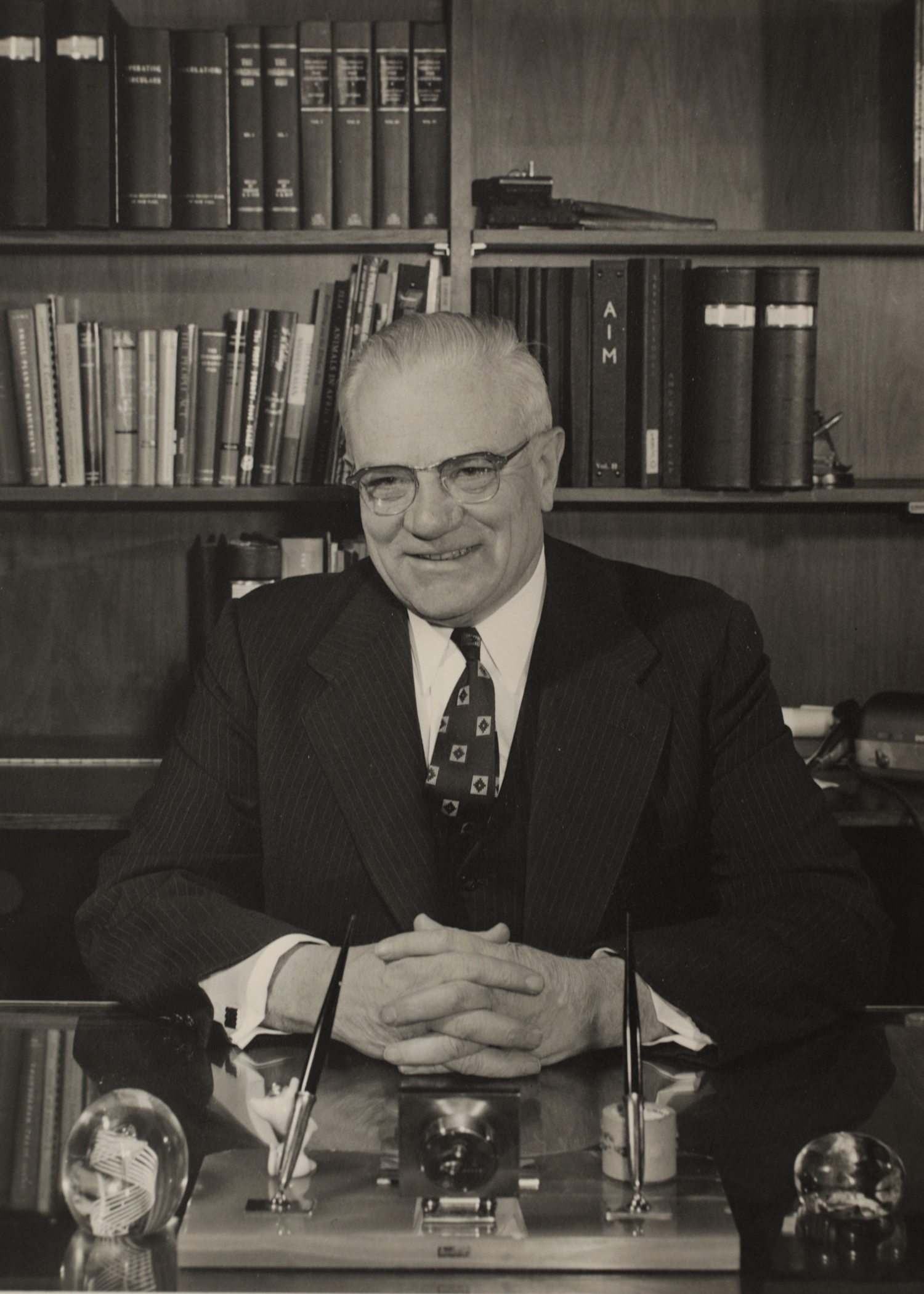
- Peo c. 1959
- Born: Ralph Frederick Peo; May 3, 1897; Rochester, New York, U.S.
- Died: November 29, 1966 (aged 69); Buffalo, New York. U.S.
- Resting place: Forest Lawn Cemetery, Buffalo, New York
- Education: Rochester Institute of Technology
- Occupations: Chairman and CEO of Houdaille Industries
- Spouse(s): Mageline F. Heath (1917–1942); Ethelmay Madeline Brent (1943–1966)
- Children: 3
- Parent(s): Julian Frederick Peo; Flora E. VanSchaik

Ralph Frederick Peo (May 3, 1897 – November 29, 1966) was an American inventor, engineer, business executive in the automobile industry, and the holder of 150 patents. He was founder of Frontier Industries in Buffalo, New York and was CEO of Houdaille Industries from 1955 to 1962 and chairman of the board from 1956 to 1964. A pioneer in the development of the automobile shock absorber, Peo invented the first thermostatically controlled shock absorber. He also invented one of the earliest air conditioners for use in automobiles.

== Early life ==
Peo was born in Rochester, New York, the oldest of three sons of Julien Frederick Peo and Flora (VanSchaick) Peo. The Peo family had come to America from France in 1832 and settled in Jefferson County, New York. The French spelling of the family surname was Peillot. His father encouraged him to work creatively with his hands. He had a workshop with many valuable tools in the basement of their home on Richard Street, Rochester. He attended Rochester Public School No. 15 and The Mechanics Institute of Rochester where he graduated in 1915 with a mechanical engineering degree.

== Career ==
After college, he went to Detroit, Michigan to gain experience in the automobile industry. He first worked for Packard Motor Car Corporation as a draftsman and purposely changed jobs every year for the next five years. He first moved to Dodge Brothers, then Oakland, Ford Motor Companies, and, finally, General Motors. He became acquainted with Charles F. Kettering of General Motors, who he regarded as the greatest American inventor in the automotive field. He worked in the Detroit auto industry for nine years until 1924 when he relocated to Buffalo, New York to become the assistant chief engineer at the American Radiator Company. In October 1927, Henry Ford wrote to A.B. Schultz, president of the Houde Engineering Corporation of Buffalo, manufactures of Houdaille shock absorbers. Ford told Schultz that if he hired 30 year old Peo to supervise production at the Buffalo plant, then Ford would install Houdaille shock absorbers on every Ford automobile manufactured. Houde Engineering was acquired by the Houdaille-Hershey Corporation and Peo became Executive Vice President of Houdaille-Hershey and president of the Buffalo Division.

During World War II he continued to manage the Buffalo Houdaille operations as well as the Buffalo Arms, Incorporated, a newly formed subsidiary of Houdaille-Hershey, which manufactured machine guns. He was known to be a production wizard. His motto was "get it done".

After WWII, he resigned from Houdaille and formed Frontier Industries by putting together a group of four diversified manufacturing companies, Buffalo Arms, Buffalo Crushed Stone, Fairmount Tool and Forging Company of Cleveland, Ohio, and Manzel Brothers, manufactures of lubricating machines.

In 1955 Frontier Industries merged with Detroit-based Houdaille-Hershey. Peo became CEO, the corporate name was changed to Houdaille Industries and the corporate headquarters was moved to Buffalo.

By the end of 1961 Peo had developed Houdaille into a national business leader in the construction materials, automotive parts, and industrial tools & machinery industries with over $80 million in annual sales, over 60 business locations in the United States and Canada and 9,783 shareholders. Peo retired as CEO in 1962 and continued as Chairman of the Board until 1964, when he became Chairman Emeritus.

== Personal life ==
Peo was an avid gardener. At one time he cultivated over 100,000 tulips in his garden at his Buffalo home. He also had a life long passion for boating. In his youth he would paddle a small boat along the shores of Lake Ontario, near Rochester, and sing to onlookers to earn spending money. As an adult, he purchased larger watercraft, the largest, a 60 foot yacht named HI Lady (for Houdaille Industries). Later in life he owned a 50+ foot Hatteras yacht named the BarBeth IV (for his daughters). In 1917 Peo married Magdeline Heath who died in 1942 at age 48. They had one son, Jack Heath Peo (1919–1968). In 1943 he married Ethelmay Brent (1909–1971) and they had two daughters. He died in Buffalo on November 29, 1966.

== Awards, honors and community activities ==
- 1955 University of Buffalo outstanding businessman of the Niagara Frontier
- 1957 Rochester Institute of Technology alumnus of the year
- Chairman of the Board of the New York Higher Education Assistance Corporation
- Chairman of the Buffalo Branch of the Federal Reserve Bank of New York

== Patents ==
- U.S. patent 1,781,127 Hydraulic Shock Absorber, Issued: November 11, 1930
- U.S. patent 1,798,352 Hydraulic Shock Absorber, Issued: March 31, 1931
- U.S. patent 1,852,755 Hydraulic Shock Absorber, Issued: April 5, 1932
- U.S. patent 1,881,956 Automobile Shock Absorber, Issued: October 11, 1932
- U.S. patent 1,881,957 Thermostatic valve for Shock Absorber, Issued: October 11, 1932
- U.S. patent 1,881,958 Joint for Automobile, Issued: October 11, 1932
- U.S. patent 1,881,959 Coupling for Moving Members, Issued: October 11, 1932
- U.S. patent 1,881,960 Sway prevention device, Issued: October 11, 1932
- U.S. patent 1,884,188 Hydraulic Shock Absorber, Issued: October 25, 1932
- U.S. patent 1,905,496 Shifting Device, Issued: April 25, 1933
- U.S. patent 1,910,049 Hydraulic Shock Absorber, Issued: May 23, 1933
- U.S. patent 1,920,272 Hydraulic Shock Absorber, Issued: August 1, 1933
- U.S. patent 1,929,791 Controller for Shock Absorbers, Issued: October 10, 1933
- U.S. patent 1,937,126 Hydraulic Shock Absorber, Issued: November 28, 1933
- U.S. patent 1,940,694 Method of Making Pistons for Shock Absorbers, Issued: December 26, 1933
- U.S. patent 1,963,145 Hydraulic Shock Absorber, Issued: June 19, 1934
- U.S. patent 2,004,902 Hydraulic Shock Absorber, Issued: June 11, 1935
- U.S. patent 2,004,903 Hydraulic Shock Absorber, Issued: June 11, 1935
- U.S. patent 2,004,904 Hydraulic Shock Absorber, Issued: June 11, 1935
- U.S. patent 2,004,905 Hydraulic Shock Absorber, Issued: June 11, 1935
- U.S. patent 2,004,960 Hydraulic Shock Absorber, Issued: June 18, 1935
- U.S. patent 2,005,004 Link, Issued: June 18, 1935
- U.S. patent 2,005,750 Hydraulic Shock Absorber, Issued: June 25, 1935
- U.S. patent 2,005,751 Thermostatic valve Structure for Hydraulic Shock Absorbers, Issued: June 25, 1935
- U.S. patent 2,019,725 Individual Wheel Suspension, Issued: November 5, 1935
- U.S. patent 2,021,427 Valve Mechanism, Issued: November 19, 1935
- U.S. patent 2,021,428 Hydraulic Shock Absorber, Issued: November 19, 1935
- U.S. patent 2,028,164 Hydraulic Shock Absorber, Issued: January 21, 1936
- U.S. patent 2,036,234 Link Assembly, Issued: April 7, 1936
- U.S. patent 2,037,819 Hydraulic Shock Absorber, Issued: April 21, 1936
- U.S. patent 2,037,820 Hydraulic Shock Absorber, Issued: April 21, 1936
- U.S. patent 2,038,596 Hydraulic Shock Absorber, Issued: April 28, 1936
- U.S. patent 2,038,597 Individual Wheel Suspension, Issued: April 28, 1936
- U.S. patent 2,038,598 Hydraulic Shock Absorber, Issued: April 28, 1936
- U.S. patent 2,043,488 Hydraulic Shock Absorber, Issued: June 9, 1936
- U.S. patent 2,043,489 Hydraulic Shock Absorber, Issued: June 9, 1936
- U.S. patent 2,054,466 Hydraulic Shock Absorber, Issued: September 15, 1936
- U.S. patent 2,054,467 Hydraulic Shock Absorber, Issued: September 15, 1936
- U.S. patent 2,055,983 Automatic Tire Inflation Attachment, Issued: September 29, 1936
- U.S. patent 2,063,619 Hydraulic Shock Absorber, Issued: December 8, 1936
- U.S. patent 2,066,695 Joint, Issued: January 5, 1937
- U.S. patent 2,077,582 Bearing Sleeve and Joint Assembly, Issued: April 20, 1937
- U.S. patent 2,077,583 Deflector for Automotive Vehicles, Issued: April 20, 1937
- U.S. patent 2,079,869 Thermostatic Valve Assembly, Issued: May 11, 1937
- U.S. patent 2,086,236 Valving Assembly for Hydraulic Shock Absorbers, Issued: July 6, 1937
- U.S. patent 2,089,417 Valving Assembly for Hydraulic Shock Absorbers, Issued: August 10, 1937
- U.S. patent 2,089,418 Valving Assembly for Hydraulic Shock Absorbers, Issued: August 10, 1937
- U.S. patent 2,089,419 Valving Assembly for Hydraulic Shock Absorbers, Issued: August 10, 1937
- U.S. patent 2,091,103 Link, Issued: August 24, 1937
- U.S. patent 2,095,711 Connecting Link, Issued: October 12, 1937
- U.S. patent 2,096,468 Valving Assembly for Hydraulic Shock Absorbers, Issued: October 19, 1937
- U.S. patent 2,096,557 Joint, Issued: October 19, 1937
- U.S. patent 2,099,227 Air Cooling Unit for Automobile Vehicles, Issued: November 16, 1937
- U.S. patent 2,100,407 Valving Assembly for Hydraulic Shock Absorbers, Issued: November 30, 1937
- U.S. patent 2,107,341 Governor Clutch, Issued: February 8, 1938
- U.S. patent 2,115,785 Automobile Air Conditioning System, Issued: May 3, 1938
- U.S. patent 2,116,981 Air Conditioning Evaporator, Issued: May 10, 1938
- U.S. patent 2,122,652 Link, Issued: July 5, 1938
- U.S. patent 2,126,408 Link Assembly, Issued: August 9, 1938
- U.S. patent 2,139,459 Oil Separator for Evaporators, Issued: December 6, 1938
- U.S. patent 2,139,912 Hydraulic Shock Absorber Valve Structure, Issued: December 13, 1938
- U.S. patent 2,162,537 Refrigerating System, Issued: June 13, 1939
- U.S. patent 2,162,538 Dry Ice Air Conditioning Unit for Vehicles, Issued: June 13, 1939
- U.S. patent 2,171,762 Dry Ice Air Conditioner, Issued: September 5, 1939
- U.S. patent 2,173,372 Hydraulic Shock Absorber, Issued: September 19, 1939
- U.S. patent 2,180,943 Air Conditioning System for Automobiles, Issued: November 21, 1939
- U.S. patent 2,182,569 Roof Mounted Air Conditioner, Issued: December 5, 1939
- U.S. patent 2,184,398 Link Assembly, Issued: December 26, 1939
- U.S. patent 2,194,053 Hydraulic Shock Absorber, Issued: March 19, 1940
- U.S. patent 2,202,918 Independent Wheel Suspension, Issued: June 4, 1940
- U.S. patent 2,256,470 Hydraulic Shock Absorber, Issued: September 23, 1941
- U.S. patent 2,261,409 Hydraulic Shock Absorber, Issued: November 4, 1941
- U.S. patent 2,273,535 Control Device for Refrigerating Systems, Issued: February 17, 1942
- U.S. patent 2,301,318 Thermostatic Bypass Valve, Issued: November 10, 1942
