= Joseph Wickham Roe =

American engineer

Joseph Wickham Roe (1871 - 1960) was an American engineer and Professor of Industrial Engineering at the New York University, known for his seminal work on machine tools and machine tool builders history.

== Biography ==
Roe was born in 1871 as youngest child of Alfred Cox, pastor of a Presbyterian church and educator, and Emma Wickham Roe. After attending the Burr and Burton Academy, he graduated in 1895 at the Yale's Sheffield Scientific School, and after years of practice received his Master of Engineering in 1907.

Roe began his career in industry, working for various manufacturing companies from 1895 to 1907. He then joined the faculty of the Sheffield Scientific School, where he taught mechanical engineering and machine design from 1907 to 1917. During the final year of World War I, he served as a major in the Aviation Section of the Signal Reserve Corps of the U.S. Army, after which he returned to industry for two additional years. In 1912, he was appointed Professor of Industrial Engineering at New York University and served as chair of the Department of Industrial Engineering until his retirement in 1937. He also served as President of the Society of Industrial Engineers during the 1920s. During World War II, Roe acted as a consultant to the U.S. Navy. Following the war, he retired and spent his remaining years in Southport, Connecticut.

== Selected publications ==
- Joseph Wickham Roe. Steam turbines. 1911.
- Joseph Wickham Roe. English and American tool builders. 1916
- Joseph Wickham Roe. The Mechanical Equipment. 1918. Vol 3.
- Wallace Clark, Joseph W. Roe, Walter N. Polakov, Harry Tripper. (1921). Foremanship. Young Men's Christian Associations. United Y.M.C.A. schools.
- Joseph Wickham Roe. Connecticut inventors. p. 1934.
- Joseph Wickham Roe. Interchangeable manufacture in American industry. Newcomen regional meeting address, 1939.
- Joseph Wickham Roe. Ralph Edward Flanders. 1944.
