= Houdaille Industries =

American manufacturer

Houdaille Industries, Inc.
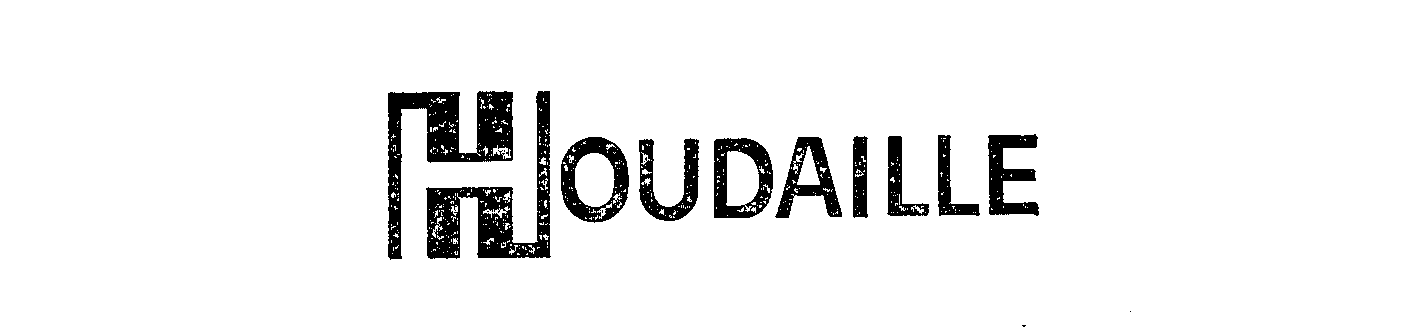
- Type: Public
- Industry: Automotive parts, machine tools, construction materials
- Predecessors: Houdaille-Hershey Corporation; Houde Engineering Corporation
- Founded: January 19, 1919; 107 years ago in Buffalo, New York, U.S.
- Defunct: September 1987
- Successor: TI Group; IDEX Corporation
- Key people: A.B. Shultz; Claire L. Barnes; Ralph Peo; Gerald C. Saltarelli; Donald N. Boyce
- Number of employees: 9,000 (1977)

Houdaille Industries was a diversified manufacturing company which produced automotive products, industrial products, machine tools, construction materials and contracting. The company had its beginnings in Buffalo, New York, in 1919, where the Houde Engineering Corporation manufactured shock absorbers that had been invented and patented in France by Maurice Houdaille (1880–1953). The company continued to grow with the automobile industry, and through diversification, until 1987 when it was forced to liquidate most of its assets to satisfy obligations to investors from a 1979 leveraged buy out.

== History ==
=== Houde Engineering ===
On March 1, 1909, French engineer and inventor Maurice Houdaille (1880–1953) filed for a patent for a shock absorbing apparatus. U.S. patent 933,076 was granted 7 September 1909. In 1915, French born import specialist Paul Victor Clodio (1882–1928), acquired the rights, from Maurice Houdaille, to manufacture and sell the Houdaille shock absorber in the United States. Clodio founded the Houdaille Shock Absorber Co., Inc. in New York City.

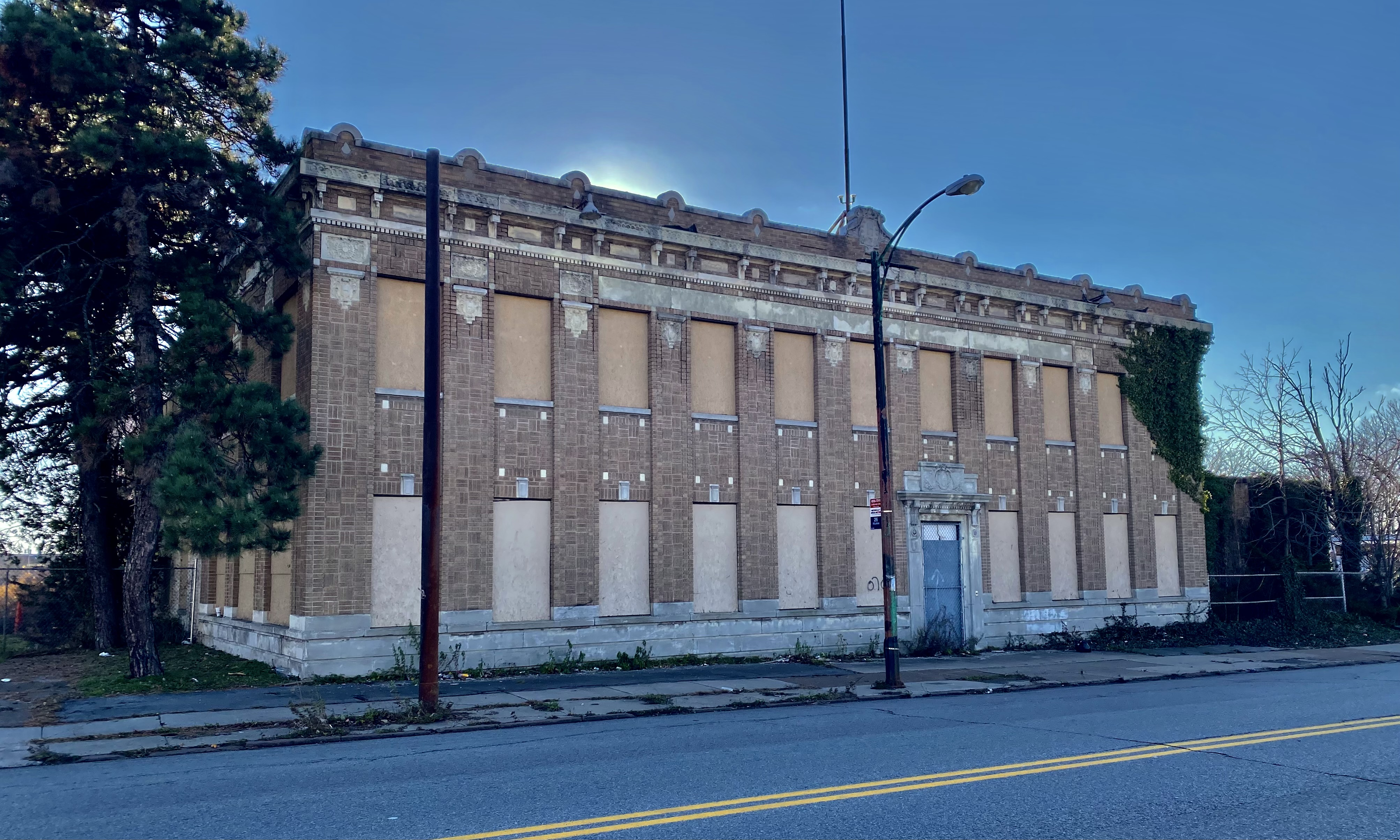
537 East Delavan Avenue - 2021

On January 27, 1919, Buffalo, NY automotive engineer Albert B. Shultz (1877–1932), and his brother, B. David Schultz, a Rolls-Royce dealer, filed articles of incorporation for the Houde Engineering Corporation with New York State. The name Houde was an attempt to anglicize Houdaille. Houde acquired manufacturing and selling rights for the Houdaille shock absorber from importer Clodio. Clodio retained the selling rights for the New York City area. In 1925 Houde acquired the New York Houdaille Company and moved manufacturing operations from 1400 West Avenue, Buffalo, to a newly constructed plant at 533-537 East Delavan Avenue, Buffalo, to facilitate its growth.

In 1927, the patents were purchased from the original French owners and Houde became the sole manufacturer and distributor of the Houdaille designed shock absorber in the United States. The following October, Henry Ford wrote to Shultz and told him that if Houde would hire then 30 year old mechanical engineer Ralph Peo to supervise production at the plant, then Ford would purchase Houdaille shocks for all of the new Ford automobiles. Production of shock absorbers doubled.

In late September, 1928, Shultz sold Houde to Frederick B. Cooley and a small syndicate of investors for $4.3 million. Two months later Cooley and his investors sold Houde to Claire L. Barnes for $6 million.

=== Houdaille-Hershey ===
Detroit industrialist Claire L. Barnes (1880–1947) created the Houdaille Corporation of Michigan in 1928 to acquire Houde Engineering from Cooley. On January 30, 1929, Barnes consolidated his new organization with two other companies, Oakes Products and Hershey Manufacturing, both involved in manufacturing products for the automobile industry, renaming it Houdaille-Hershey Corporation with its headquarters in Detroit. The Oakes Products Company, of Indianapolis, had been incorporated in Indiana in 1912 and manufactured spare wheel and tire locks, door locks, cooling fans, air cleaners and carburetors. In 1919 Hershey Manufacturing Company was organized in Colorado. Hershey manufactured ignition and steering wheel locks with plants in Chicago and Detroit.

After Barnes created the Houdaille-Hershey Corporation it became one of the country's largest suppliers of automobile parts to the Detroit manufacturers. In August 1929, Schultz resigned as president of the company and Ralph Peo was named vice president and general manager of the Houde Engineering Division of Houdaille-Hershey Corporation.

The company continued its acquisition of other automobile related manufactures The Skinner Company, Ltd of Gananoque, Ontario, which manufactured auto bumpers; Muskegon Motors Specialties, which made crankshafts and camshafts; Biflex Products Corporation, bumpers; Lion Cover Company, metal tire covers; and General Bumper Corporation, one of the world's largest manufacturers of spring bumpers for automobiles. The company had plants in Buffalo, New York, Chicago, Illinois, Indianapolis, Indiana, Muskegon, Michigan, Decatur, Illinois and Gananoque and Oshawa, Canada, and was being considered for acquisition by both Ford and GM.

In November 1932, the New York Stock Exchange approved the listing of its class A common stock on the exchange.

In June 1937, Charles Getler was elected president of the company and Barnes became chairman of the board, Ralph Peo was chosen as vice-president.

Barnes retired in 1940.

Houdaille continued growth through acquisition and when the U.S. entered WWII the company retooled many of its production facilities for the war effort. Houdaille's Garfield bumper plant in Decatur, Illinois contracted with the Top Secret Manhattan Project to nickel plate large pipes to be used to build the Atomic Bomb at the K-25 plant at Oak Ridge, Tennessee, which was dropped on Hiroshima on August 6, 1945.

After the war, Houdaille bought a plant in Huntington, West Virginia and retooled it to manufacture automobile bumpers. It became the world's largest bumper producer.

In March 1946, Peo, then executive vice president, resigned to form Frontier Industries, Inc. As head of Frontier, Peo acquired Manzel Brothers Oil Pump Company, Fairmount Tool & Forging, Inc., of Cleveland, Ohio, the Buffalo Arms plant, and Buffalo Crushed Stone Corporation.

=== Frontier Industries merges with Houdaille-Hershey ===
Houdaille-Hershey's business was primarily in the automobile industry. Seeking to divisify to other industries, in 1955, Houdaille acquired Frontier through a merger and Ralph Peo became president of Houdaille-Hershey. Peo moved the corporate headquarters from Detroit to Buffalo and the name was changed to Houdaille Industries, Inc.

Under Peo's leadership the company acquired North Jersey Quarry Co., Commonwealth Concrete Company, Wales-Strippit Co., Gravel Products Corporation, Provincial Engineering, Ltd, Buffalo Eclipse Corporation, S.M. Jones, Eclipse Lawn Mower, Penberthy Manufacturing Co., R.H. Wright & Sons, Inc., Broward Asphalt Corporation, and Duval Engineering and Contracting. By the end of 1961 Peo had developed Houdaille into a national business leader in the construction materials, automotive parts, and industrial tools & machinery industries with over $80 million in annual sales, over 60 business locations in the United States and Canada and 9,783 shareholders.

Peo retired as CEO in 1962 and continued as chairman of the board until 1964, when he became Chairman Emeritus. Fifty year old Gerald C. Saltarelli was elected president. He had joined the company in 1941 as corporate attorney and served in a wide variety of executive positions through the years.

Saltarelli continued the growth pattern established by Peo. He purchased Morris Crane & Hoist, Deerfield Rock, Di-Arco, Burgmaster Corporation, Powermatic Machine Company, Trabon Engineering, U.S.Burke Machine Tool Co, Viking Pump, June Prestressors, Inc., Warren Pump, Band-It Company, and Fort Worth Steel and Machine Company.

By 1977 the company had over 9,000 employees in five product groups and 18 subsidiary companies. Saltarelli, exasperated with the corporate tax structure in New York State, moved the company headquarters to Florida. The company's cash rich and debt free balance sheet made it an attractive candidate for a takeover.

=== Kohlberg Kravis Roberts leveraged buyout ===
In the winter of 1978, Houdaille's stock was selling at $14.50 per share, well below book value, and Saltarelli was looking for a way to retire. Private equity firm Kohlberg, Kravis, Roberts & Co. offered a proposal for the company to undergo a leveraged buy out; it was accepted and the company was taken private at $40 per share. It was the first public company taken private, and at $355 million, the largest LBO at the time. Saltarelli walked away with a retirement package, $5 million and no hostile takeover.

After the LBO closed in May 1979, Jerome Kohlberg, Jr. became chairman of the company, and Phillip A. O'Reilly president & CEO. The company continued its acquisitions, buying the John Crane Company for $204 million and taking a 49% stake in the UK based Crane Packaging, followed by Warren Rupp for $25 million.

With the heavy debt created by the LBO, the early 1980s recession, and Japanese competition in the machine tool manufacturing industry, profits disappeared. The company petitioned President Reagan for relief from the Japanese imports, but the request was rejected. Instead, the company underwent a restructuring plan to raise cash and reduce its debt: seven divisions were split off, and it auctioned the Burgmaster division in January 1986. A year later, it underwent another LBO to pay off the original LBO investors, and KKR forced O'Reilly to retire. Donald N. Boyce became CEO and the company headquarters was moved to Northbrook, Illinois.

In 1987 KKR sold the remaining assets of Houdaille to the TI Group of London. TI kept the John Crane Division and sold six other divisions to a new KKR-created company, IDEX Corporation. The name Houdaille was gone from the American business scene.
