= It-Turretta =

It-Turretta is a Maltese word meaning "the turret". Specifically, it may refer to the following towers in Malta:

- Tower of St. Joseph, a 17th-century water tower in Santa Venera
- Għaxaq Semaphore Tower, a 19th-century semaphore tower in Għaxaq

== See also ==
- Torretta, a Sicilian town called Turretta in Sicilian
