= Heavy industry =

Type of industry

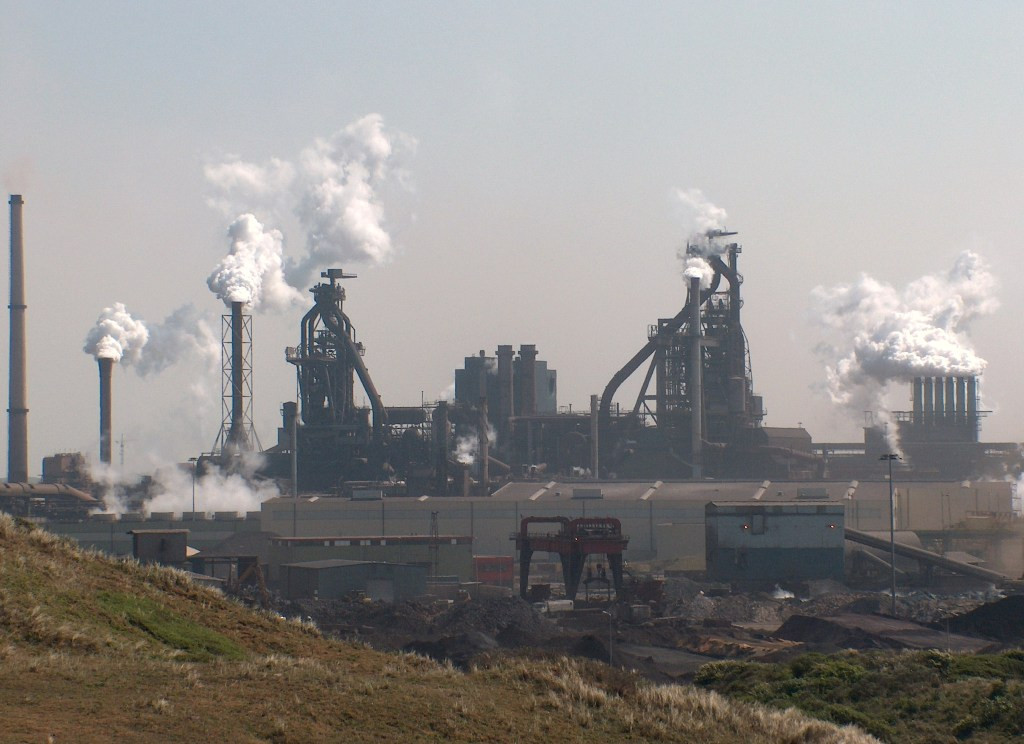
Integrated steel mill in the Netherlands. The two massive towers are blast furnaces.

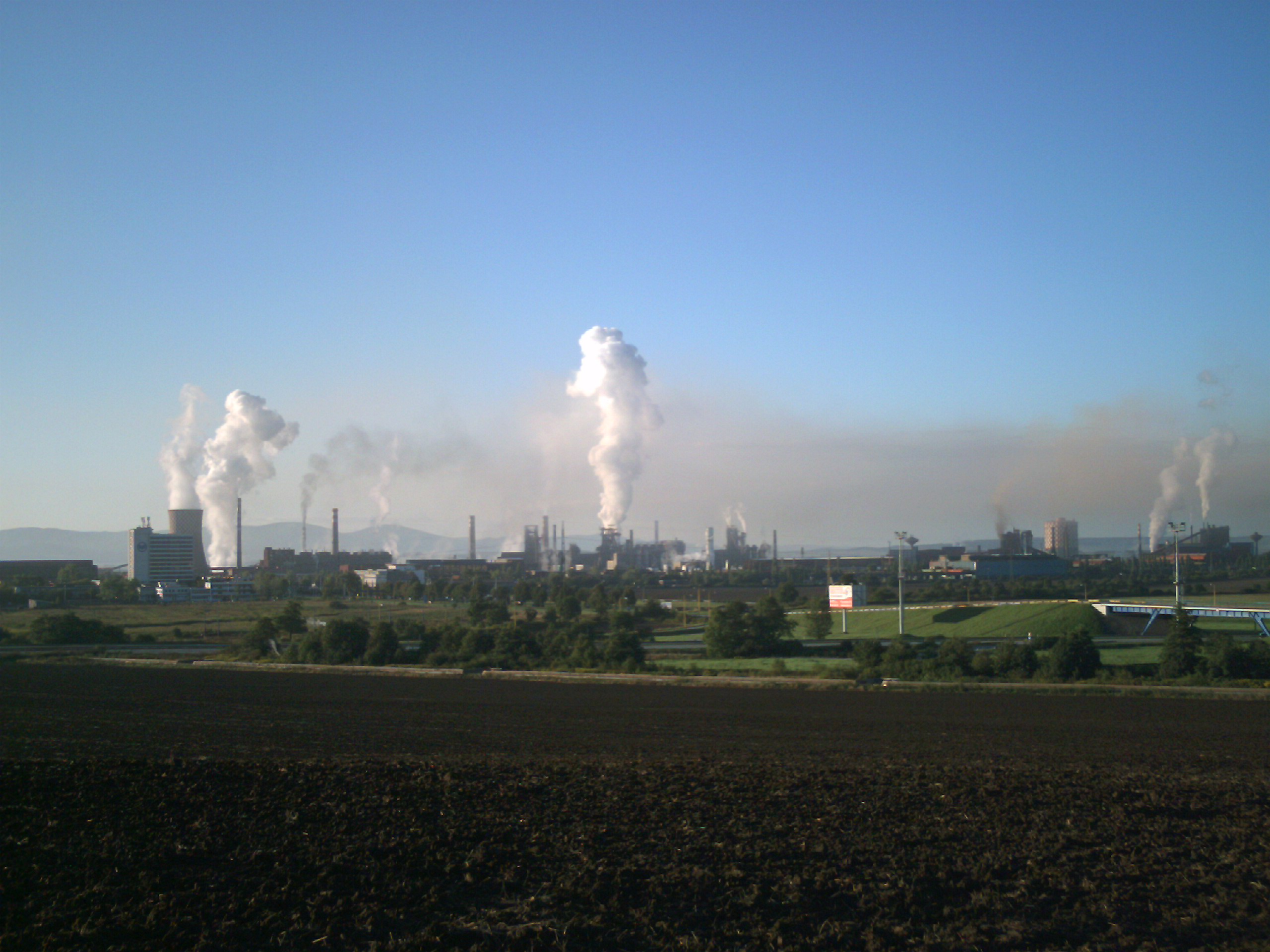
Nippon Steel Slovakia (a typical example of a heavy industry factory)

Heavy industry is an industry that involves one or more characteristics such as large and heavy products; large and heavy equipment and facilities (such as heavy equipment, large machine tools, huge buildings and large-scale infrastructure); or complex or numerous processes. Because of those factors, heavy industry involves higher capital intensity than light industry does, and is also often more heavily cyclical in investment and employment.

Though important to economic development and industrialization of economies, heavy industry can also have significant negative side effects: both local communities and workers frequently encounter health risks, heavy industries tend to produce byproducts that both pollute the air and water, and the industrial supply chain is often involved in other environmental issues from mining and transportation. Because of their intensity, heavy industries are also significant contributors to greenhouse gas emissions that cause climate change, and certain parts of the industries, especially high-heat processes used in metal working and cement production, are hard to decarbonize. Industrial activities such as mining also results in pollution consisting of heavy metals. Heavy metals are very damaging to the environment because they cannot be chemically degraded.

== Types ==
Transportation and construction along with their upstream manufacturing supply businesses have been the bulk of heavy industry throughout the industrial age, along with some capital-intensive manufacturing. Traditional examples from the mid-19th century through the early 20th included steelmaking, artillery production, locomotive manufacturing, machine tool building, and the heavier types of mining. From the late 19th century through the mid-20th, as the chemical industry and electrical industry developed, they involved components of both heavy industry and light industry, which was soon also true for the automotive industry and the aircraft industry. Modern shipbuilding (since steel replaced wood) and large components such as ship turbochargers are also characteristic of heavy industry.

Heavy industry operations frequently require moving industrial machinery, which involves careful pre-move planning such as equipment inventory, assembling a project team, conducting risk assessments, scheduling downtime, securing permits, and preparing the destination site (e.g., ensuring proper load-bearing capacity and utility setup)

A typical heavy industry activity is the production of large systems, such as the construction of skyscrapers and large dams during the post–World War II era, and the manufacture/deployment of large rockets and giant wind turbines through the 21st century.

== As part of economic strategy ==
Many East Asian countries relied on heavy industry as key parts of their development strategies, and many still do for economic growth. This reliance on heavy industry is typically a matter of government economic policy. Among Japanese and Korean firms with "heavy industry" in their names, many are also manufacturers of aerospace products and defense contractors to their respective countries' governments such as Japan's Mitsubishi Heavy Industries and Fuji Heavy Industries, and Korea's Hyundai Rotem, a joint project of Hyundai Heavy Industries and Daewoo Heavy Industries.

In 20th-century communist states, the planning of the economy often focused on heavy industry as an area for large investments (at the expense of investing in the greater production of in-demand consumer goods), even to the extent of painful opportunity costs on the production–possibility frontier (classically, "lots of guns and not enough butter"). This was motivated by fears of failing to maintain military parity with foreign capitalist powers. For example, the Soviet Union's industrialization in the 1930s, with heavy industry as the favored emphasis, sought to bring its ability to produce trucks, tanks, artillery, aircraft, and warships up to a level that would make the country a great power. China under Mao Zedong pursued a similar strategy, eventually culminating in the Great Leap Forward of 1958–1960; an unsuccessful attempt to rapidly industrialize and collectivize, that led to the largest famine in human history, killing up to 50 million people, whilst simultaneously severely depleting the production of agricultural products and not increasing the output of usable-quality industrial goods.

== In zoning ==
Heavy industry is also sometimes a special designation in local zoning laws, allowing placement of industries with heavy impacts (on environment, infrastructure, and employment) with planning. For example, the zoning restrictions for landfills usually take into account the heavy truck traffic that will exert expensive wear on the roads leading to the landfill.

== Environmental impacts ==
=== Greenhouse gas emissions ===
As of 2019, heavy industry emits about 22% of global greenhouse gas emissions: high temperature heat for heavy industry being about 10% of global emissions. The steel industry alone was responsible for 7 to 9% of the global carbon dioxide emissions which is inherently related to the main production process via reduction of iron with coal. In order to reduce these carbon dioxide emissions, carbon capture and utilization and carbon capture and storage technology is looked at. Heavy industry has the advantage of being a point source which is less energy-intensive to apply the latter technologies and results in a cheaper carbon capture compared to direct air capture.

=== Pollution ===
Industrial activities such as the improper disposal of radioactive material, burning coal and fossil fuels, and releasing liquid waste into the environment contribute to the pollution of water, soil, air, and wildlife.

In regards to water pollution, when waste is disposed of in the environment, it affects the quality of the available water supply which has a negative impact on the ecosystem along with water supply used by farms for irrigation which in turn affects crops. Heavy metals have also been shown to pollute soil, deteriorating arable land quality and adversely impacting food safety (such as vegetables or grain). This occurs as a result of heavy industry when those heavy metals sink into the ground contaminating the crops that reside among it.

Heavy metal concentrations resulting from water and/or soil pollution can become deadly once they pass certain thresholds, which lead to plant poisoning. Heavy metals can further affect many levels of the ecosystem through bioaccumulation, because humans and many other animals rely on these plant species as sources of food. Plants can pick up these metals from the soil and begin the metal transfer to higher levels of the food chain, and eventually reaching humans.

Regarding air pollution: long-term or short-term exposure of children to industry-based air pollution can cause several adverse effects, such as cardiovascular diseases, respiratory diseases and even death. Children are also more susceptible to air pollution detriments than adults. Heavy metals such as lead, chromium, cadmium, and arsenic form dust fall particles and are harmful to the human body, with the latter two being carcinogens. As a result of pollution, the toxic chemicals released into the atmosphere also contributes to global warming due to the increase of radiation absorbed.

=== Sacrifice zones ===
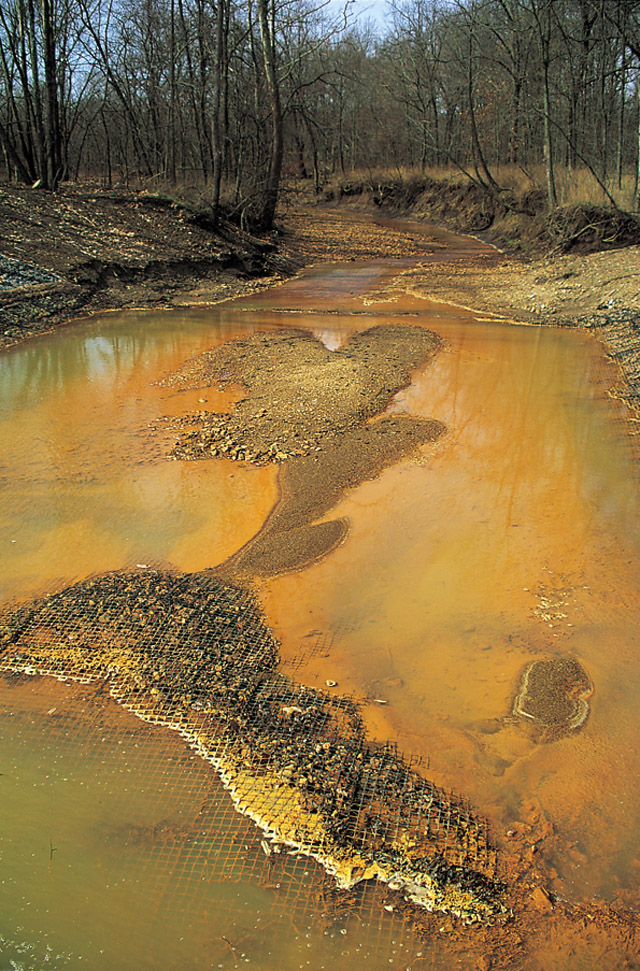
A sacrifice zone where iron hydroxide precipitate from coal mining has damaged a stream and surrounding area

A sacrifice zone or sacrifice area (often termed a national sacrifice zone or national sacrifice area) is a geographic area that has been permanently changed by heavy environmental alterations (usually to a negative degree) or economic disinvestment, often through locally unwanted land use (LULU). Commentators including Chris Hedges, Joe Sacco, and Steve Lerner have argued that corporate business practices contribute to producing sacrifice zones. A 2022 report by the United Nations highlighted that millions of people globally are in pollution sacrifice zones, particularly in zones used for heavy industry and mining. Moreover, this exposure disproportionately affects groups and communities that already experience systematic discrimination and marginalization.
