= List of early locomotives of the London Brighton and South Coast Railway =

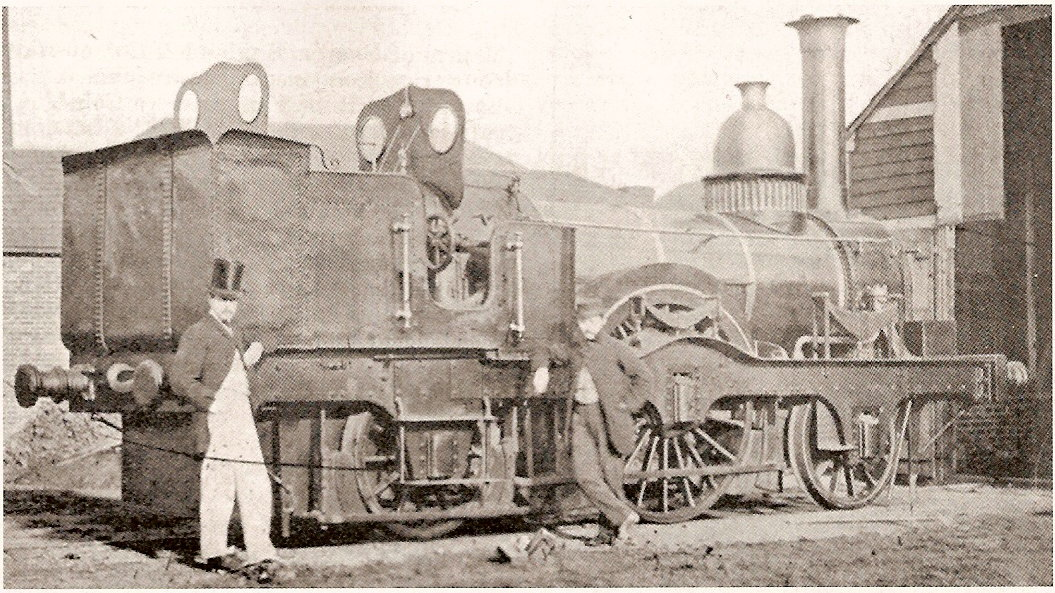
LBSCR 2-2-2WT, built by Sharp Brothers in 1849 and later sold to the Colne Valley and Halstead Railway

The following table gives details of locomotives owned by the London, Brighton and South Coast Railway (LB&SCR) from its creation in July 1846 until the end of 1849.

The locomotives acquired by the LB&SCR at its formation came from the division of those owned previously operated by the Joint Committee of the South Eastern, London and Croydon and London and Brighton Railways. The division took place in 1845 but only took effect after the Committee's dissolution in January 1846.

The majority of the locomotives acquired were owned or ordered by one of the three constituent railways, but some had been ordered by the Joint Committee. After the Joint Committee's dissolution, some locomotives were ordered by John Gray, the new locomotive superintendent, from Timothy Hackworth and delivered during 1847 and 1848. Others were purchased from Stothert & Slaughter between 1847 and 1849. After this date the railway's new locomotives were designed and built by John Chester Craven, usually at Brighton railway works (see List of Craven locomotives).

== Locomotive summary ==
L&B No.	Later L&B No.	Type	Manufacturer	Delivered	Name	Jt. Cttee No.	1845 Disposal	LBSCR No.	Withdrawn	Original Rly
		2-2-2	Sharp, Roberts and Company	1838/07		1	L&BR	21	1849/03	SER
		2-2-2	Sharp, Roberts and Company	1838/09		3	L&BR	22	1855/06	SER
1		2-2-2	Jones, Turner and Evans	1839/01	Brighton	45	SER			L&BR
		2-2-2	Sharp, Roberts and Company	1839/02		4	L&BR	23	1861/09	SER
2		0-4-2	Jones, Turner and Evans	1839/04	Shoreham	46	SER			L&BR
3	20	2-2-2	Sharp, Roberts and Company	1839/07	Merstham	52	L&BR	45	1854/10	L&BR
		2-2-2	Sharp, Roberts and Company	1839/07		8	L&CR	25	1868/11	L&CR
4	38	2-2-2	Sharp, Roberts and Company	1839/08	Coulsdon	53	L&BR	34	1853/05	L&BR
5	39	2-2-2	Sharp, Roberts and Company	1839/11	Kingston	50	L&CR	44	1851/08	L&BR
6		2-2-2	G and J Rennie	1840/04	Eagle	47	L&BR	14	1855/12	L&BR
7		2-2-2	G and J Rennie	1840/05	Vulture	48	L&BR	15	1853/03	L&BR
?		2-2-2	Sharp, Roberts and Company	1840/07	Venus	51	SER			L&BR
9	40	2-2-2	Sharp, Roberts and Company	1840/12	Jupiter	54	L&BR	46	1854/11	L&BR
10		2-2-2	Sharp, Roberts and Company	1841/01	Mars	55	SER			L&BR
11		2-2-0	Edward Bury and Company	1841/03		61	L&BR	1	1850/12	L&BR
12		2-2-0	Edward Bury and Company	1841/03		62	SER			L&BR
13		2-2-0	Edward Bury and Company	1841/03		63	L&BR	2	1858/08	L&BR
?		2-2-2	Sharp, Roberts and Company	1841/07	Saturn	56	SER			L&BR
?		2-2-2	Sharp, Roberts and Company	1841/07	Mercury	57	SER			L&BR
?		2-2-0	Edward Bury and Company	1841/07		64	SER			L&BR
?		2-2-0	Edward Bury and Company	1841/07		65	L&BR	3	1857/02	L&BR
?		2-2-0	Edward Bury and Company	1841/07		66	L&BR	7	1858/07	L&BR
?		2-2-2	Sharp, Roberts and Company	1841/07	Orion	58	SER			L&BR
?		2-2-2	Sharp, Roberts and Company	1841/07	Sirius	59	SER			L&BR
21	41	2-2-2	Sharp, Roberts and Company	1841/09		60	L&BR	47	1853/03	L&BR
22		2-2-0	William Fairbairn	1841/09		72	L&CR	17	1868/11	L&BR
23		2-2-2	Sharp, Roberts and Company	1841/09		67	SER			L&BR
24		2-2-2	Sharp, Roberts and Company	1841/10		68	L&CR	48	1856/06	L&BR
25		2-2-2	Sharp, Roberts and Company	1841/11		69	L&CR	49	1853/06	L&BR
27		2-2-2	Sharp, Roberts and Company	1841/11	`	70	SER			L&BR
28		2-2-2	Sharp, Roberts and Company	1841/11		71	SER			L&BR
26		2-2-2	G and J Rennie	1841/12	Satellite	49	L&BR	13	1855/06	L&BR
29		2-2-0	William Fairbairn	1842/05		73	SER			L&BR
30		2-2-0	William Fairbairn	1842/05		74	L&BR	18	1854/11	L&BR
31		2-2-0	William Fairbairn	1842/06		75	L&BR	19	1849/09	L&BR
32		2-4-0	George Forrester and Company	1842/10		76	SER			L&BR
33		2-4-0	George Forrester and Company	1842/10		77	SER			L&BR
		2-2-0	Edward Bury and Company	1842/10		21	L&BR	4	1861/08	SER
		2-2-0	Edward Bury and Company	1842/10		22	L&BR	5	1848/08	SER
		2-2-0	Edward Bury and Company	1842/11		23	L&BR	6	1855/06	SER
		2-2-2	Sharp, Roberts and Company	1843/01		30	L&BR	24	1852/06	SER
		2-2-2	G and J Rennie	1843/02		28	L&BR	16	1855/06	Jt Cttee
34		2-4-0	George Forrester and Company	1843/03		78	L&BR		1845/08	L&BR
		2-2-2	Sharp Brothers	1843/07		35	L&CR	43	1853/08	SER
		0-4-0	Edward Bury and Company	1843/12	Gog	23	L&BR	9	1848/08	Jt Cttee
		2-2-2	Sharp Brothers	1844/02		42	L&BR	33	1867/07	Jt Cttee
		2-2-2	Sharp Brothers	1844/10		85	L&BR	26	1852/09	Jt Cttee
		2-2-2	Sharp Brothers	1844/10		88	L&CR	50	1860/07	Jt Cttee
		0-4-0	Edward Bury and Company	1844/10		81	L&BR	8	1848/08	Jt Cttee
		0-4-0	Edward Bury and Company	1844/11		83	L&BR	10	1848/05	Jt Cttee
		0-4-0	Edward Bury and Company	1844/11		110	L&BR	11	1855/12	Jt Cttee
		0-4-0	Edward Bury and Company	1844/11		112	L&BR	12	1864/04	Jt Cttee
		2-2-2	Sharp Brothers	1844/12		89	L&BR	27	1868/07	Jt Cttee
		2-2-2	Sharp Brothers	1845/03		90	L&CR	51	1853/06	Jt Cttee
		2-2-2	Sharp Brothers	1845/04		91	L&BR	28	1868/05	Jt Cttee
		2-2-2	R and W Hawthorn Ltd	1845/05		96	L&BR	37	1871/06	Jt Cttee
		2-2-2	Sharp Brothers	1845/06		92	L&BR	29	1864/11	Jt Cttee
		2-2-2	Sharp Brothers	1845/06		93	L&BR	30	1864/12	Jt Cttee
		2-2-2	Sharp Brothers	1845/06		94	L&BR	31	1862/08	Jt Cttee
		2-2-2	R and W Hawthorn Ltd	1845/06		97	L&BR	38	1858/06	Jt Cttee
		2-2-2	Jones and Potts	1845/07		119	L&BR	39	1863/08	Jt Cttee
		2-2-2	Sharp Brothers	1845/07		95	L&BR	32	1861/08	Jt Cttee
		2-2-2	R and W Hawthorn Ltd	1845/07		98	L&BR	35	1859/05	Jt Cttee
		2-2-2	R and W Hawthorn Ltd	1845/07		99	L&BR	36	1867/10	Jt Cttee
		2-2-2	Jones and Potts	1845/08		120	L&BR	40	1869/03	Jt Cttee
		2-2-2	Jones and Potts	1845/10		121	L&BR	41	1860/12	Jt Cttee
		2-2-2	John George Bodmer	1845/12		124	L&BR	20	1892/03	Jt Cttee
		2-2-2	Jones and Potts	1846/01		122	L&BR	42	1859/11	Jt Cttee
		2-2-2	Timothy Hackworth	1846/09				52	1862/10	
		2-2-2	Timothy Hackworth	1846/11				53	1872/11	
		2-2-2	Timothy Hackworth	1847/03				54	1863/06	
		2-2-2	Timothy Hackworth	1847/04				55	1860/06	
		2-2-2	Timothy Hackworth	1847/06				56	1875/07	
		2-2-2	Timothy Hackworth	1847/08				57	1870/03	
		2-2-2	Timothy Hackworth	1847/09				58	1868/11	
		2-2-2	Timothy Hackworth	1847/12				59	1860/06	
		2-2-2	Timothy Hackworth	1848/01				60	1874/02	
		2-2-2	Timothy Hackworth	1848/03				50	1876/07	
		2-2-2	Timothy Hackworth	1848/05				51	1869/08	
		2-2-2	Timothy Hackworth	1848/07				49	1870/09	
		2-2-2	Timothy Hackworth	1848/09				52	1868/05	
		2-2-2	Timothy Hackworth	1848/01				55	1873/02	
		0-6-0	Stothert & Slaughter	1846/12				73	1876/10	
		0-6-0	Stothert & Slaughter	1847/01				74	1870/04	
		2-2-2	Stothert & Slaughter	1848/03				84	1861/09	
		2-2-2	Stothert & Slaughter	1847/12				85	1870/11	
		2-2-2	Stothert & Slaughter	1847/12				86	1862/08	
		2-2-2	Stothert & Slaughter	1847/12				87	1870/11	
		2-2-2	Stothert & Slaughter	1848/03				88	1873/10	
		2-2-2	Stothert & Slaughter	1848/03				89	1860/12	
		2-4-0	Stothert & Slaughter	1847/09				90	1873/09	
		2-4-0	Stothert & Slaughter	1847/09				91	1875/12	
		2-2-2	Stothert & Slaughter	1847/09				92	1870/09	
		2-2-2	Stothert & Slaughter	1847/10				93	1870/11	
		2-2-2	Stothert & Slaughter	1847/10				94	1870/09	
		2-2-2	Stothert & Slaughter	1848/03				95	1870/03	
		2-2-2	Sharp Brothers	1847/04				70	1876/01	
		2-2-2	Sharp Brothers	1847/06				81	1882/08	
		2-2-2	Sharp Brothers	1847/07				82	1876/03	
		2-2-2	Sharp Brothers	1847/07				83	1881/06	
		2-2-2	Sharp Brothers	1847/09				86	1871/06	
		2-2-2	Sharp Brothers	1847/12				87	1880/03	
		2-2-2	Sharp Brothers	1847/12				88		
		2-2-2	Sharp Brothers	1847/10				89		
		2-2-2	Sharp Brothers	1848/01				76		
		2-2-2	Sharp Brothers	1848/07				72		
		2-2-2	Sharp Brothers	1848/07				73		
		2-2-2	Sharp Brothers	1848/07				75		
		2-4-0	Sharp Brothers	1848/08				71		
		2-2-2	Sharp Brothers	1848/12				39		
		2-2-2	Sharp Brothers	1848/12				43		
		2-2-2	Sharp Brothers	1849/02				21		
		2-2-2	Sharp Brothers	1849/03				19		
		2-2-2	Sharp Brothers	1849/03				47		
		2-2-2	Sharp Brothers	1849/04				34		
		2-2-2	Sharp Brothers	1849/10				35		
		2-2-2	Sharp Brothers	1849/11				36		
		2-2-2	Stothert & Slaughter	1849/11				37		

== Sources ==
- Bradley, D.L. (1969). Locomotives of the London Brighton and South Coast Railway: Part 1. Railway Correspondence and Travel Society.
- Bradley, D.L. (1963). Locomotives of the South Eastern Railway. Railway Correspondence and Travel Society.
