= Jenny Lind locomotive =

British steam locomotive

Jenny Lind
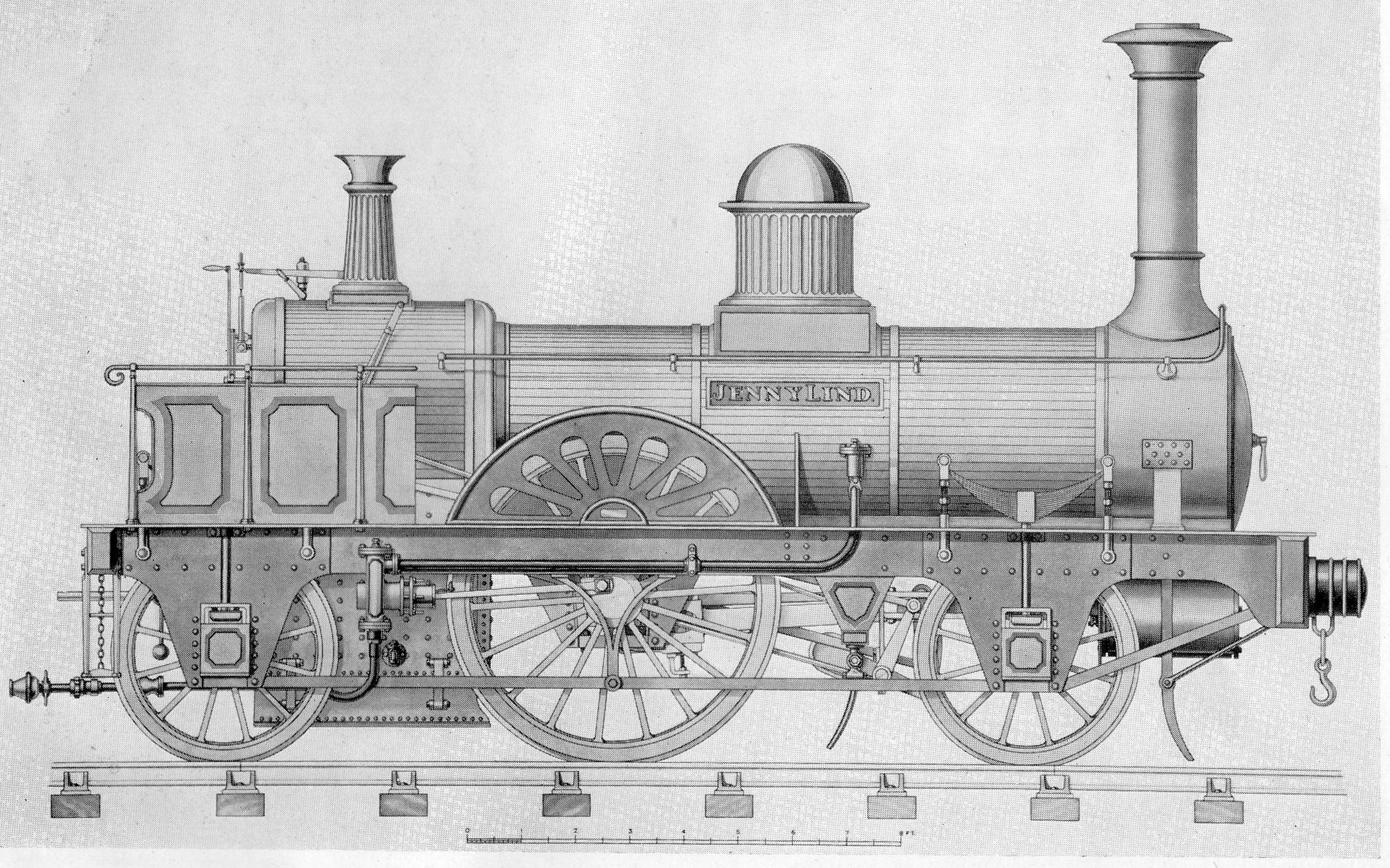
- A drawing of the original Jenny Lind locomotive
Type and origin
- Power type: Steam
- Designer: David Joy, James Fenton
- Builder: E. B. Wilson and Company
- Build date: 1847
Specifications
- Configuration
  - Whyte: 2-2-2
  - UIC: 1A1 n2p
- Gauge: 4 ft 8 1/2 in (1,435 mm) standard gauge
- Leading dia.: 4 ft 0 in (1.219 m)
- Driver dia.: 6 ft 0 in (1.829 m)
- Trailing dia.: 4 ft 0 in (1.219 m)
- Boiler pressure: 120 lbf/in^{2} (827 kPa)
- Heating surface: 800 sq ft (74 m^{2})
- Cylinders: Two, inside
- Cylinder size: 15 in × 20 in (381 mm × 508 mm)
- Valve gear: Joy
Performance figures
- Tractive effort: 6,375 lbf (28.36 kN)
Career
- Operators: London, Brighton and South Coast Railway
- Official name: Jenny Lind

Jenny Lind was the first of a class of ten steam locomotives built in 1847 for the London, Brighton and South Coast Railway (LB&SCR) by E. B. Wilson and Company of Leeds, named after Jenny Lind, who was a famous Swedish opera singer of the period. The general design proved to be so successful that the manufacturers adopted it for use on other railways, and it became the first mass-produced locomotive type. The "Jenny Lind" type was also widely copied during the late 1840s and 1850s, and into the 1860s.

== History ==
David Joy, the Chief Draughtsman of E. B. Wilson and Company, was asked to visit Brighton railway works to make tracings of the drawings of a 2-2-2 locomotive designed by John Gray for the railway so that ten further examples could be built. However, before he had completed the task, Gray had been dismissed from his post of Locomotive Superintendent, and his successor Thomas Kirtley did not favour Gray's complicated horse-leg motion. As a result it was left to Joy and James Fenton, the works manager at E.B. Wilson, to adapt the design. Joy had spent his formative years studying all the locomotives he came across, sketching them, making notes, and interviewing their owners and crews — and, if he could, getting rides on them.

As is usual in engineering, there were a number of trade-offs to be made in steam locomotive design. There is a limit to the rate that steam can be delivered to the pistons; therefore, higher speed was obtained with larger driving wheels. These, however, limited the size of the boiler, since it needed to fit between them, particularly with the preoccupation of the time with a lower centre of gravity. The tendency had been to lengthen the boilers with supporting wheels front and rear. Thus, passenger engines, like the so-called Long Boiler locomotives, were usually of a 4-2-0 wheel arrangement. However, too long a boiler also created instability. Some locomotives improved adhesion for heavier loads by coupling pairs of driving wheels, but there was a tendency for the wrought iron coupling rods to break especially at speed. Thus, four- and six-coupled locomotives were used for freight trains.

Joy and Fenton settled on a medium-sized boiler, 800 sq ft (74 m^{2}) heated surface area, with a pressure of 120 lbf/in^{2} (827 kPa) and concentrated on its steaming abilities. In this, James Fenton had particular expertise. The engine had 15-by-20-inch (380 mm × 510 mm) inside cylinders and 6-foot-0-inch-diameter (1.83 m) driving wheels. Gray's so-called "mixed" frame had an inside frame for the cylinders and driving wheels, with inside bearings, and an outside frame for the 4-foot-0-inch-diameter (1.22 m) leading and trailing wheels, using outside bearings. The inside frame stopped at the firebox, so that the latter was as wide as the wheels would allow. By this means he minimized the overhang at each end.

After strengthening of various members, the engine was three tons heavier than expected. However, it steamed freely and was economical on fuel. It was to this that its success was attributed, along with the increase in boiler pressure that had become possible over the years. However, credit must be given to Joy's suspension arrangements that made it extremely smooth-running and stable. The name "Jenny Lind" was given to the first one delivered to the LB&SCR.

=== Jenny Lind type ===
The new class proved to be so successful that the design was used by Wilson & Co. as their standard design and more than seventy examples were built for various railways, including twenty-four for the Midland Railway. It could be said to be the first to be mass-produced to a consistent pattern. Indeed, the manufacturers charged a hefty premium for variations, although in response to pressure, they later built a number of "large jennies".

Other manufacturers and railways also adopted the type. John Chester Craven, Kirtley's successor at Brighton, built a class of five similar "Jenny Lind singles" from 1853 to 1854. An enlarged type was also built by Beyer, Peacock and Company in 1860 for the Portuguese South Western Railway.
