= Joshua Routledge =

English engineer and inventor (1773–1829)

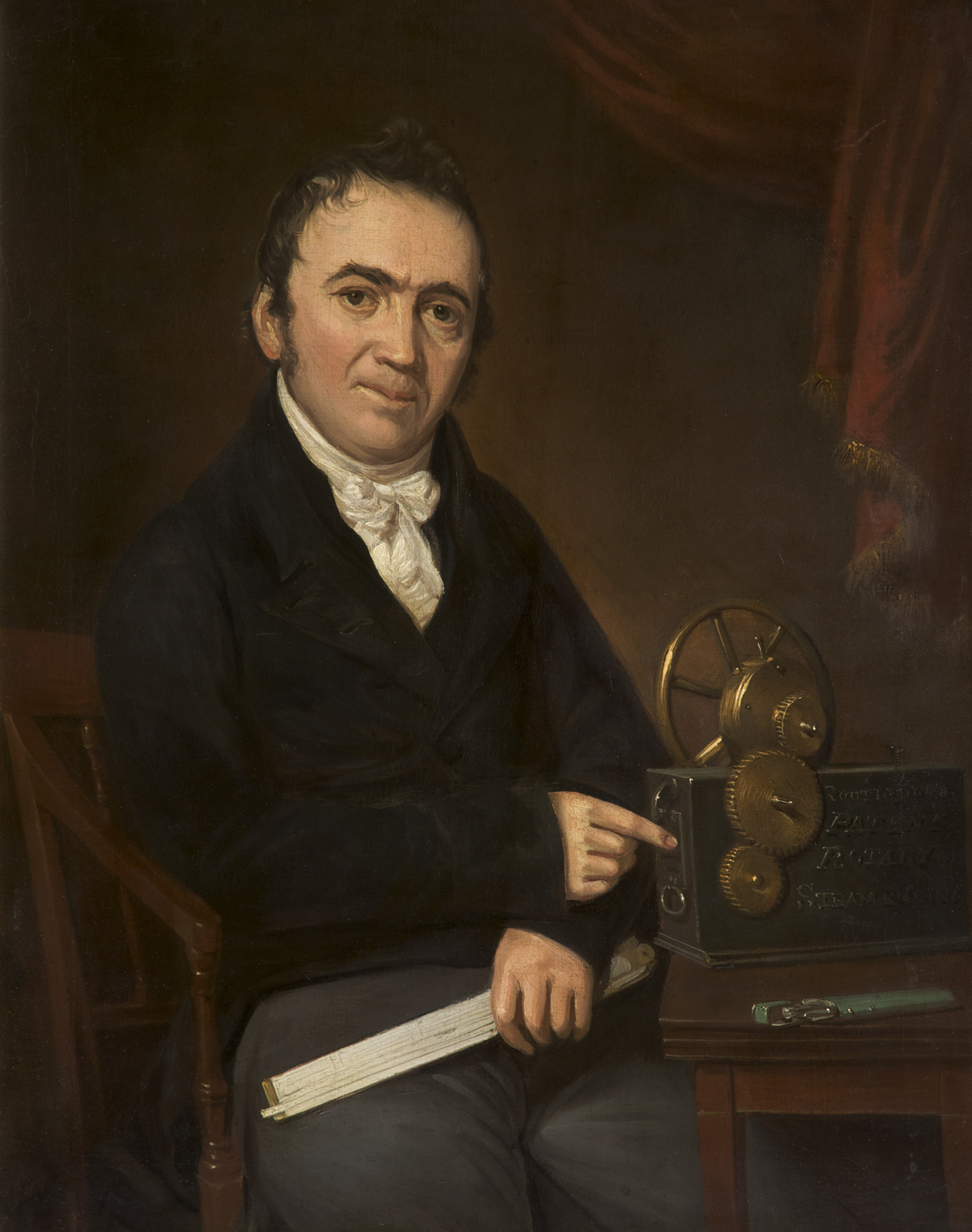
- c.1820 by Unknown artist, displaying Routledge's Engineer's Rule and Patent Rotary Steam Engine
- Born: 27 April 1773; Riccall, Yorkshire
- Died: 8 February 1829 (aged 55); Warsaw, Poland
- Occupations: Engineer; Ironmonger
- Known for: Slide rule Rotary Steam Engine

Joshua Routledge (27 April 1773 – 8 February 1829) was an engineer and inventor of the early 19th century during the Industrial Revolution.

Mechanical engineering as a profession was on the rise and the advent of the steam age opened up viable career alternatives for many young Englishmen who, like Joshua Routledge, grew up in an agriculture-based society.

== Early life ==
Born on 27 April 1773 and baptised on the 29th in Riccall, Yorkshire. Joshua Routledge was third of twelve children. Generations of Routledges were established as yeoman farmers and weavers in Riccall, a village about 9 miles (14 km) south of the city of York.

Joshua's father was a blacksmith by trade, but he seems to have been pious, curious and adventurous by nature. The Industrial Revolution allowed the advancement of all sorts of radical new ideas in tandem with mechanical innovations. Religious, political, and social reformers took to the highways and byways spreading discontent with the status quo. John Wesley being one reformer whose message took hold in Yorkshire. Wesley's brand of fervent evangelical Methodism encouraged lay preachers, which appealed very much to the working classes, William Routledge (1744-1822) for one. It is known that William with wife Sarah Bell (1746-1819), one-year-old Joshua and his two-year-old sister Dinah (1771-1791), joined a group of Methodists sailing to Nova Scotia, Canada in 1774. Records indicate that the family sailed on board the vessel Two Friends, embarking from Hull, Yorkshire the "week of 28th February to 7th March" and arriving in Halifax on 9 May 1774.

It is certain that the family returned to Yorkshire before 1778 when Joshua's brother Joseph was born in Elvington, a village located about 7 miles southeast of York. Later on, they joined the Methodist movement as active members of the York Circuit, and according to an account by J. D. Greenhalgh published in 1882, William Routledge was among a list of "Wesleyan Methodist ministers admitted...in the year 1800."

== Career ==
Nothing is recorded of Joshua Routledge's early education, but supposedly he learned something about the smithing trades from his father. In 1798 Routledge was in Leeds, Yorkshire where his occupation is given as "whitesmith" (tinsmith) on a marriage certificate recorded at St Peter's Parish Church, Leeds. This was the occasion of his first marriage, on 5 November, to Mary King. A daughter, Ann, was born there in 1803.

=== The Round Foundry ===
Routledge may have apprenticed at the historic Round Foundry in Leeds. Matthew Murray (1765–1826) and David Wood (1761–1820) partnered in building the Round Foundry circa 1795 and were later joined by James Fenton (1754–1834) and silent partner William Lister. Fenton, Murray, & Wood quickly gained a reputation for innovative thinking and sound technical practices. The firm became famous as designers and builders of textile machinery and steam engines that rivalled the Soho Works in Birmingham operated by steam-age pioneers James Watt and Matthew Boulton.

=== Routledge Engineer's Rule ===
By 1800, Routledge had become Manager at the Round Foundry. Somehow, along the way, he learned the value of logarithms and thereby had the means of developing a method of measuring "all kinds of metals and other bodies" needed for engineering purposes. Using the principles of Edmund Gunter's (1581–1626) logarithmic scales and William Oughtred's (1574–1660) sliding rule, Routledge combined a 12-inch brass slide containing the logarithmic scales with an ordinary 2-foot ruler to which he added a table of commonly used references called gauge points. This rule became known as the Routledge Engineer's Rule.

According to a handwritten, unsigned document on file at Bolton Archives (Lancashire) Routledge acquired a patent for his improved slide rule in 1813 but, to date, no record of this has been traced. It is certain that, in 1805, he published the first known Instructions for the Engineer's Improved Sliding Rule and that numerous editions followed before and after his death in 1829, the most recent being in 1983.

A letter from his parents, dated 1811, records that Routledge was associated, at that time, with Thompson, Swift and Co, iron founders and steam engine makers located in Little Bolton, Lancashire, and a notice published in the Manchester Mercury dated 12 November 1811 informs that his partnership with that firm had been dissolved by mutual consent.

=== Improved Rotary Steam Engine ===
In 1816, Routledge had a prosperous ironmonger (hardware) business at 26 Deansgate in Bolton. That business allowed him time to engage in other engineering pursuits as well as support his inventive activities. Thus, in February 1818, he acquired a patent for "An Improvement or Improvements Upon the Rotary Steam Engine." A newspaper account dated 8 August 1822 and quoted in Historical Gleanings Bolton & District describes him as the "spirited and ingenious inventor" of a portable, steam-powered machine that broke stones for road repair at the "astounding rate of 70 or 80 tons in ten hours," something "never before contemplated."

About this time, his name appears among the original shareholders of Bolton Gaslight and Coke Company supplying gas to the towns of Great and Little Bolton

In 1822, he entered into a short-lived partnership (dissolved 1824) with William Kay of Bury Lancashire to supply iron pillars to the specification of William Fairbairn for the "fireproof" Hudcar Mill, said to be state-of-the-art for cotton mills of the day. The Hudcar Mill, built for manufacturer Thomas Haslam, was demolished in 1977. Pigot and Dean's Directory of 1821–22 styles the partnership of Kay and Routledge as Brass and Ironfounders and Engineers.

Sometime before leaving England, in 1824, for Warsaw, Poland, Routledge undertook another engineering project with Joseph (1765–1842) and Thomas Ridgway (1778–1839) to extend and rearrange the pioneering Wallsuches Bleach Works in Horwich, Lancashire. Wallsuches Bleach Works is preserved as a Grade II listed complex, described as a "rare survival of a once large scale important industry in the Bolton area".

In Poland, Routledge engaged with Thomas Evans & Co of Warsaw to erect a large steam corn mill. This foundry was the forerunner of Lilpop, Rau i Loewenstein, another noteworthy engineering firm distinguished by its expertise in the manufacture of railroad engines and other heavy-duty industrial machinery.

== Family Connections ==
Joshua Routledge was twice married, first in 1798 to Mary King about whom nothing more has been found, except that a daughter Ann (1803–1814) came from that union.

=== Hick Family ===
A contemporary of Routledge by the name of Benjamin Hick (1787/90–1842) also received training at the Round Foundry, and the two ambitious young men left Leeds for greener pastures sometime around 1810. Both settled in Bolton Lancashire where engineering advances in the machinery needed for large scale cotton milling would soon bring about boom times for the whole region. Joshua witnessed the marriage of his sister Elizabeth (1783–1826) to Benjamin Hick in April 1811. Hick went on to found the highly respected Bolton engineering firm Benjamin Hick & Sons, later Hick, Hargreaves & Co.

Elizabeth and Benjamin had five children: Mary born in 1813, John in 1815, Benjamin in 1818, William in 1820, and Eliza Rachel in 1821. John Hick, besides his notable engineering career while extending the family firm, distinguished himself as Bolton town councillor for 9 years before serving as a Conservative Member of Parliament from 1868 to 1880.

=== Abel and Bowker Families ===
Soon after witnessing the marriage of Elizabeth and Benjamin, Joshua followed suit, marrying Frances Abel on 14 July 1811. Frances was the widow of James Abel (1770–1801), a prominent Freemason in Bolton. She had two children from that marriage, Mary Ann who died in 1802 aged 2 years and 9 months and Samuel (1802–1842). Upon marrying Joshua she became stepmother to his daughter Ann who died on 19 August 1814 and was buried, alongside her half siblings, in the Abel family plot at St Peter's Parish Church.

Frances (1777–1844) came from the politically and socially active Bowker family. Her elder brothers, William Bowker (b 1768) and Jonathan (b 1770), made significant contributions to the building and running of Great and Little Bolton during the early 1800s. Bowker's Row, a small street in the heart of Bolton, is named for them. Both Jonathan and William are found on a list of "Bolton Politicians in 1806," and William was elected Boroughreeve in 1812.

During 1819, in reference to the infamous Peterloo Massacre, William Bowker, as Boroughreeve, wrote a letter advising the local Magistrate that the leading men of the town intended to protest by "meeting publicly to address the Prince Regent on the late proceedings at Manchester on the 16th of August last." Joshua Routledge was among the signers of the letter.

== Last Days ==
Tragically, Routledge contracted a cancerous tumor while in Poland where he died on 8 February 1829 in a state of near penury, having received little or no payment or support from his employers during his illness. An 1888 newspaper article quoted one of the last entries in his diary: "F [Fanny, his wife] been up to Evans for money, but he did not give any; did nothing but abuse me as usual; and she abused him as ill, but he is callous to everything."

After Joshua's death, Frances returned to Bolton with their three children: William (1812–1872), Frances (1814–1872), and Henry (1817–1884). William and Henry went into engineering along with their half-brother Samuel Abel. William and Henry both inherited the inventive spirit of their father, having, between the two, qualified for numerous mechanical patents in their day. Their sister Frances remained unmarried and nothing more of her career is known.

== Legacy ==
The Routledge Engineer's Rule proved to be the model for further slide rule improvements during the 19th and even into the 20th century, including Wilkinson's Routledge's Spinners' Rule, Armstrong's Drafting Rule, Hawthorne's Locomotive Rule, Carrett's General Engineering Rule, and Noble's Eureka Slide Rule. In 1921, James Noble, an engineer at Sheffield, published the 7th edition of his Instructions for the Use of the Eureka Slide Rule in which he acknowledges the "Routledge Rule," stating that "ere long it will have to be taught in all towns throughout the Kingdom, as anyone who has the Rule well in hand will work out questions while another is committing them to paper."
