= Murray's Hypocycloidal Engine =

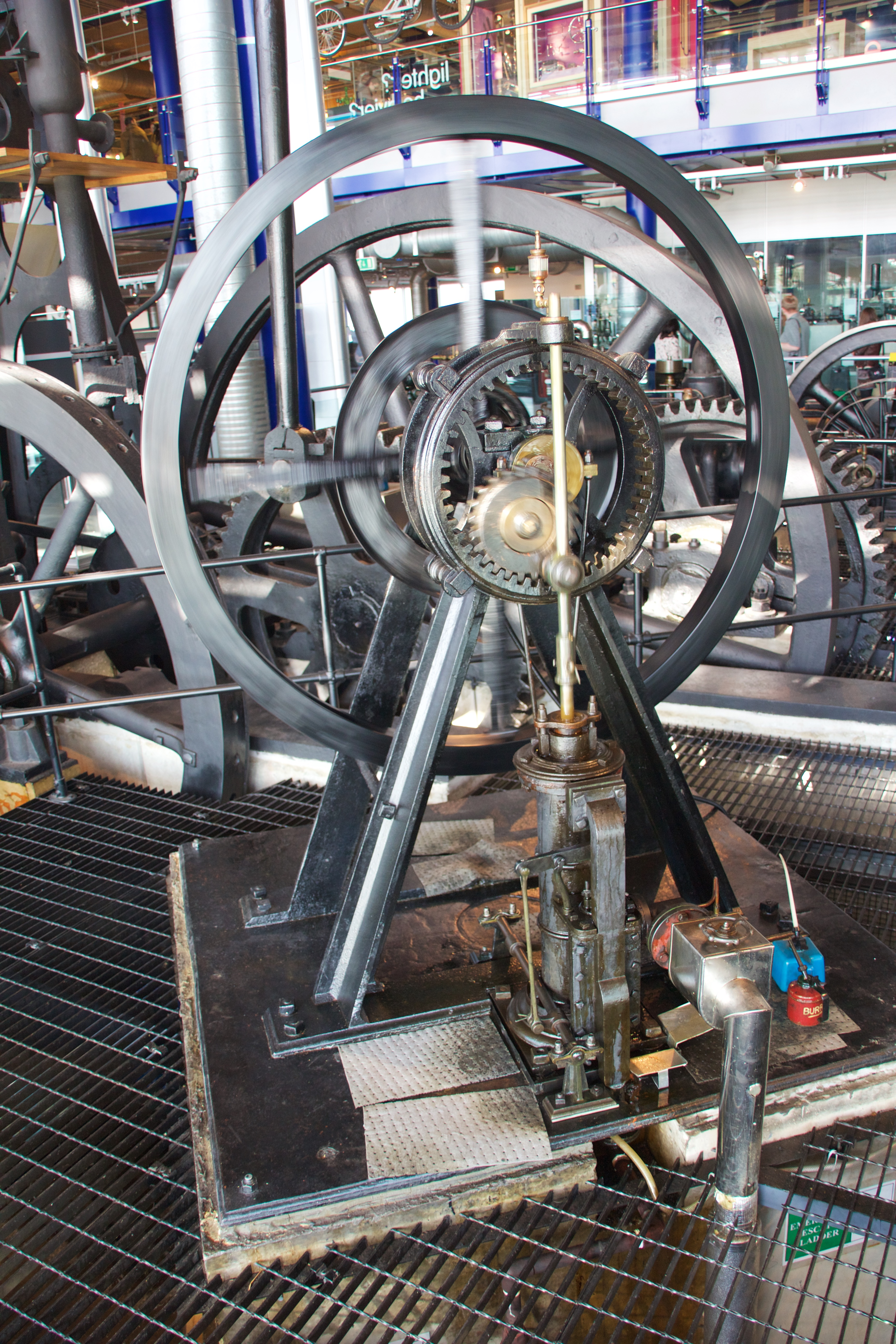
- The engine at Thinktank

Origins
- Type: Hypocycloidal
- Designer: Matthew Murray
- Maker: Fenton, Murray and Wood
- Date: 1805
- Country of origin: England
- Former operator: 1805 – 1931: John Bradley & Co, Stourbridge; 1931 – 1961: N. Hingley & Sons Ltd, Netherton

Measurements
- Cylinders: 1

Preservation
- Collection: Birmingham Museums Trust
- Location: Thinktank, Digbeth, Birmingham, England
- Accession no.: 1961S01437.00001
- Murray's Hypocycloidal Engine recording of the engine ticking over at low load

The engine in motion

Murray's Hypocycloidal Engine, now in Thinktank, Birmingham Science Museum, England, was made around 1805 and is the world's third-oldest working steam engine and the oldest working engine with a Tusi couple hypocycloidal straight line mechanism. (Note: The oldest working engine, the Smethwick Engine, and the second oldest, the Whitbread Engine, are beam engines, and neither uses a hypocycloidal straight line mechanism.)

== History ==
Designed by Matthew Murray, and made by Fenton, Murray and Wood of Holbeck, Leeds, it is one of only two of the type to survive; the other is located at The Henry Ford, Michigan, United States.

The single-cylinder engine was used by John Bradley & Co of Stourbridge from 1805 until 1931, and by N. Hingley & Sons Ltd of Netherton from 1931 until 1961, when it was acquired by Birmingham City Council for their science museum.

Murray patented the hypocycloidal arrangement in 1802.

== See also ==
- Birmingham Museums Trust
- Rotative beam engine
- Smethwick Engine – the oldest working engine in the world, also at Thinktank
- Sun and planet gear
- Whitbread Engine – the second-oldest working engine; one of the first rotative steam engines
