= Johann Bodmer =

Johann Bodmer may refer to:

- Johann Georg Bodmer (1786–1864), Swiss inventor
- Johann Jakob Bodmer (1698–1783), Swiss author and critic
