= John Chester Craven =

English locomotive engineer

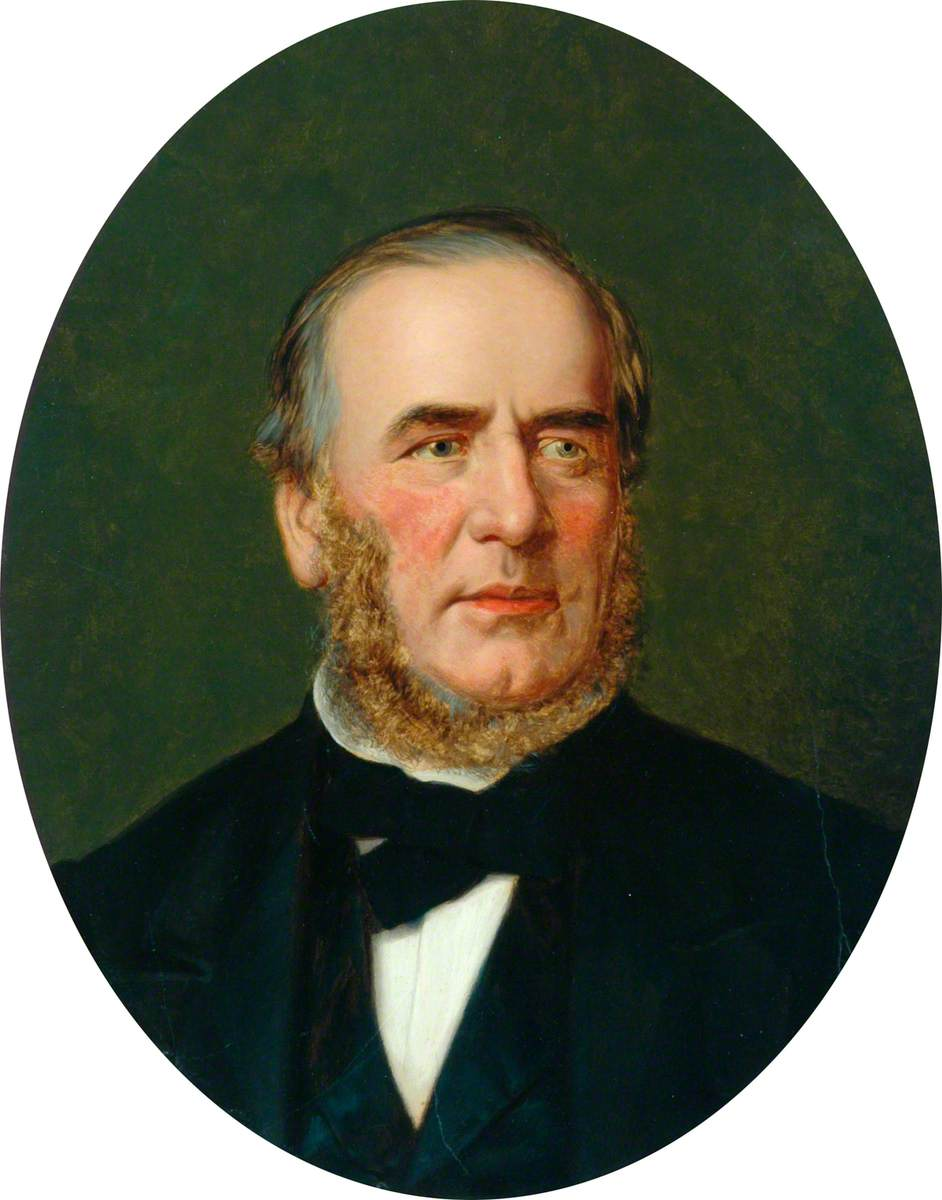

John Chester Craven (born 1813 in Hunslet, Leeds) was an English locomotive engineer. He was the locomotive, carriage and wagon superintendent of the London, Brighton and South Coast Railway from 1847 until his resignation in 1870. He died in 1887.

== Early career ==
Little is known of Craven's parentage and there is also some confusion over his early career, but all sources agree that he was born 11 September 1813 at Hunslet a suburb of Leeds. According to John Marshall, Craven began an apprenticeship with Robert Stephenson and Company of Newcastle, later transferring to Fenton, Murray and Jackson of Leeds at the age of fourteen. Bradley states that he began his apprenticeship Fenton Murray and Jackson. He appears to have left Fenton, Murray and Jackson in 1837, and worked briefly for Carrett, Marshall and Company of the Sun Foundry, followed by a year working for Maudslay and Company of Westminster. He then returned to Leeds to become works manager either for Todd, Kitson & Laird followed by Shepherd and Todd or else Shepherd and Todd. He spent three years at Leeds working with David Joy and John Gray, before he was appointed Locomotive Foreman of the Manchester and Leeds Railway (M&LR) on 9 November 1842, under James Fenton.

Following the resignation of Fenton in January 1845, William Jenkins was appointed to replace him in February, and Craven was promoted to outdoor locomotive superintendent under Jenkins. The line from Miles Platting to Manchester Victoria was opened at the beginning of 1844, and had a gradient of between 1 in 47 (2.13%) and 1 in 59 (1.69%) for 2,320 yards (2,120 m) with a total rise of 116 feet (35 m) up to Miles Platting. A stationary engine and wire rope had been installed during 1843, ready for the opening of the line, in order to assist trains up the bank from Manchester Victoria. In March 1845, Craven successfully demonstrated that normal 0-6-0 locomotives with wheels of 4 ft 6 in (1.37 m) diameter could haul trains up this incline, and this convinced the M&LR directors that the rope haulage could be dispensed with.

Craven resigned from the M&LR in May 1845 and then became Locomotive Engineer for the Eastern Counties Railway at Stratford Works but little is known of his work there. In December 1847 he took up his principal post as Locomotive, Carriage and Wagon Superintendent of the London, Brighton and South Coast Railway following the dismissal of John Gray.

== Brighton ==
Craven re-organised and greatly enlarged Brighton railway works, and recruited skilled engineers from Leeds thereby enabling locomotives to be built there for the first time. He built useful and reliable locomotives but believed that standardisation of locomotive design held back progress. Instead he followed a policy of producing classes of one or two locomotives designed for specific duties. This proved to be expensive and eventually created a chaotic maintenance situation on the railway. By the time he left office there were seventy-two different designs of locomotive in use. When the directors pressed him to reduce the number of new classes in 1869, Craven offered his resignation. This was accepted by the directors and he was succeeded by William Stroudley.

Following his resignation Craven was frequently employed as a consultant on engineering projects. He was also active in local politics. He died at Brighton in 1887.

Four carriages of Craven's design survive, Nos. 35, 94, 221 and 204, on the Bluebell Railway awaiting restoration.

== See also ==
- List of Craven locomotives

Business positions
Preceded by Thomas Kirtley	Locomotive, Carriage and Wagon Superintendent of the London, Brighton and South Coast Railway; 1847–1870	Succeeded by William Stroudley
