= E. B. Wilson and Company =

British locomotive manufacturer

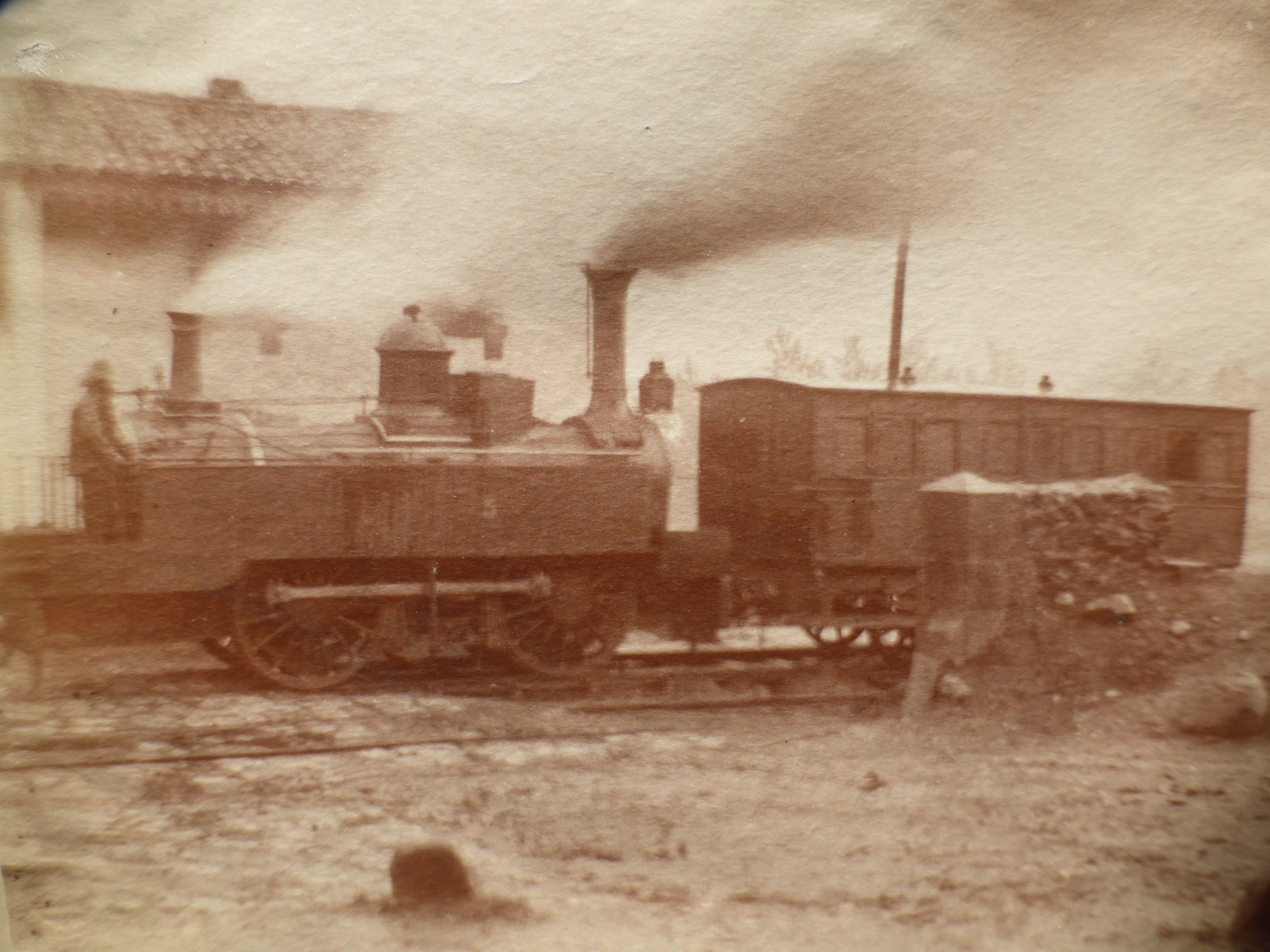
Steam locomotive number 3 of the Langreo Railway, Spain. Built in 1852 by E.B. Wilson.

E. B. Wilson and Company was a locomotive manufacturing company at the Railway Foundry in Hunslet, Leeds, West Yorkshire, England.

== Origins ==
Charles Todd was one of the founders of Todd, Kitson & Laird, but left early in the company's history and in 1838 he joined financier Mr. Shepherd in setting up the Railway Foundry as Shepherd and Todd. E.B. Wilson joined the company in 1845. A year later Wilson left and the company was taken over by James Fenton, and was renamed Fenton, Craven and Company. The partnership with Craven ended and at the end of 1846, Wilson returned to the company and took over sole ownership of the company, renaming it once more to E. B. Wilson and Company, Fenton stayed on as the Works Manager. Many of the maker's plates, however, retained the name "The Railway Foundry, Leeds".

== Expansion ==
The works was expanded with the intention of producing up to fifty engines a year. Fenton's boiler designs were particularly successful, and the company's products acquired a reputation for workmanship and reliability.

== David Joy ==
Originally an apprentice at Fenton, Murray and Jackson and later at Shepherd and Todd, David Joy was their Chief Draughtsman and was tasked with designing a new engine for the London and Brighton Railway. Dissatisfied by the engines then current in Yorkshire and having spent three weeks studying John Gray's designs at Brighton railway works, he produced a similar design. The first of these, in 1847, was named Jenny Lind and was an immediate success. There is some controversy whether Fenton, Joy or even Wilson was responsible. Joy would appear to have produced the drawings, but Fenton would have had to approve them, and the success of the engine undoubtedly owed much to the latter's boilers, which were working at the unprecedented pressure of 120psi. Over seventy were built, with twenty four going to the Midland Railway.

== Locomotive designs ==
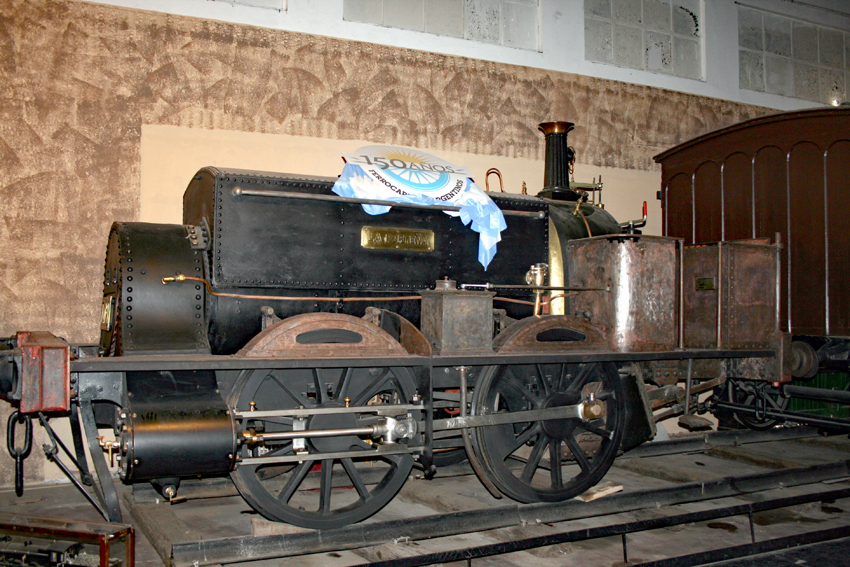
No 1 La Porteña 2-2-0ST of 1856, first steam loco in Buenos Aires

Beside the "Jennies", E. B. Wilson also produced 2-4-0 and 0-6-0 and set out to standardise their designs. They charged a premium for any variations, although the size of the engines gradually became larger. The company exhibited a double boiler tank engine at The Great Exhibition of 1851. They also produced pumping engines, carriages and wagon. and carried out maintenance work for the Midland Railway, their Derby works being then short of capacity, and built a few to customer's own designs, including one or two Crampton locomotives.

== Closure ==
The company closed in 1858 having produced over six hundred engines. The Railway Foundry was refounded by W. S. Hudswell and John Clarke in 1860.
