= E. B. Wilson =

E. B. Wilson may refer to:

- Edgar Bright Wilson (1908–1992), American chemist working in spectroscopy
- Edmund Beecher Wilson (1856–1939), American zoologist and geneticist
- Edwin Bidwell Wilson (1879–1964), American mathematician and pioneer in vector analysis
- E. B. Wilson and Company, British locomotive manufacturer
