= J. and G. Rennie =

British engineering company

- Industry: Engineering
- Founded: 1821
- Defunct: 1890
- Fate: Wound up
- Headquarters: Millwall, London
- Key people: George Rennie
- Products: Marine steam engines

J. and G. Rennie was a British engineering company based in Millwall, London, England. They were involved in manufacture of marine engines, and some complete ships, as well as other diverse onshore engineering projects. An association with railway engines is usually attributed to G. and J. Rennie, which may suggest they used a second company to keep the books separate, and there was also George Rennie & Sons, which is associated with the development and patents of the steam disc engine. All three companies appear to have been in existence at the same time.

== History ==
The company was founded by John Rennie and his brother George Rennie after the death of their father John Rennie (senior) in 1821, who at that time was engaged in the building of London Bridge, an activity which the younger John Rennie took over, and on completion in 1831 he was knighted. George Rennie was an equally distinguished civil engineer with many academic publications, and was made a Fellow of the Royal Society in 1822. Both brothers continued their civil and hydraulic engineering interests, with their joint company participating in diverse ways. Their hydraulic engineering interest involved them with work on docks, canals and bridges, and apart from civil engineering the company specialised in building marine steam engines such as those for the SS Archimedes in 1838, which was the world's first steamship driven by screw propeller. This side of the business being a particular interest of George Rennie.

Apart from marine engines, Messrs Rennie were listed with Boulton and Watt as one of two suppliers commissioned in 1845 to make engines to create the vacuum for the South Devon atmospheric railway.

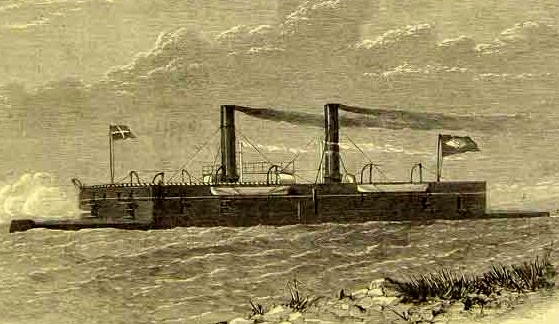
Colombo (1865)

In an advert of 1882 the company listed the following among their products :

- Steam Ships (builders of Ironclad warships Colombo and Cabral for the Imperial Brazilian Navy)
- Dredging Machines
- Floating Docks (e.g Cartagena Iron Drydock)

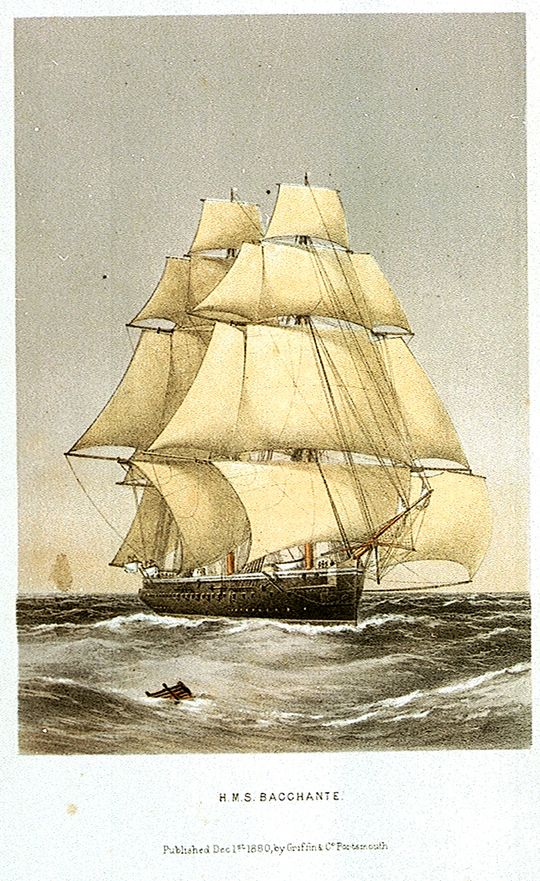
HMS Bacchante (1876)

- Screw & Paddle Engines (e.g. for HMS Bacchante, HMS Boadicea, HMS Canada, HMS Cordelia, HMS Briton, HMS Amethyst, HMS Encounter)
- Centrifugal Dock Pumping engines (for Chatham and Plymouth Docks)
- Steam Jib & Travelling Cranes
- Screw Steam Hoppers

More of the products of the Rennie company can be deduced from a catalogue of exhibits from the 1876 exhibition at the South Kensington Museum, which records a number of models exhibited :

- Model of the inverted cylinder compound engines, for P&O's Pera of 2000 hp 1872
- Model of the first screw steamer in the British Navy, Mermaid, later named the Dwarf, built in 1840.
- Model of HM Gun-boats Arrow and Bonetta. Length 85 ft, breadth 26 ft, depth 8 ft 10in, 244 tons. To carry one 18 ton gun.
- Model of the iron Paddle-wheel steamer Queen, built and fitted with engines by Rennie 1842.Length 160 ft, breadth 17 ft, depth 9 ft.
- Model of Indian Famine Relief Steamers. Built complete with engines in 35 days. Length 90 ft, breadth 14 ft, depth 5 ft 6in, 100iHP.
- Model of twin-screw gun boats built for East Indian government, 1857. Length 70 ft, breadth 11 ft, draught 2ft6in, 76iHP. One long brass 12pounder - 18cwt.
- Model of twin-screw gun boats Colombo and Cabral, 1866. Length 160 ft, breadth 34 ft, depth 17 ft. 240 nominal HP. 4 of 68-pounder guns.
- Model of twin-screw gun boats built for Spanish Government, 1859. Length 90 ft, breadth 14 ft, draught 2 ft 6in. 30HP.
- Model of the engines of HM ships Boadicea and Bacchante (1875 and 1876), compound system 5250 indicated HP.
- Model of horizontal marine engines with injection condensers, 1860.
- Model of reversed horizontal marine screw engines, 1860
- Design drawing for 60 hp low pressure condensing disc engine for screw steamship as fitted to HMS Cruizer, 1853.

== Development of the Screw Propeller ==
The brothers' involvement in the support for the screw propeller was significant, as the British Admiralty was reluctant to change away from paddle wheels, believing the pitching of a ship would lift the propeller clear of the water in heavy seas causing the engine stress and rendering the vessel hard to control. Francis Pettit Smith and Captain John Ericsson had been trying to demonstrate the potential of the propeller for five years, and eventually it was Smith who formed a company to finance the building of the Archimedes (107 ft length) fitted with a Rennie single-cylinder engine and 5 ft 9in screw propeller. It was her successful trials that began in 1839 that led to the admiralty purchasing the Mermaid in 1842 (130 ft length), which was built and engined by Rennie, and fitted with the Rennie's patent propeller of 5 ft 8in diameter. This was followed by the Admiralty fitting a 10-foot diameter Smith's propeller to the unfinished sailing sloop Ardent, which was launched in April 1843 renamed HMS Rattler. The Archimedes was also loaned to Brunel and resulted in him changing the design of the SS Great Britain to screw propulsion, even though the paddle wheels were part constructed, setting back the project by 9 months.

== The Disc Steam Engine ==
The nutating disc engine was an unusual development, based on a design that dated back to the 1820s. In this engine the normal piston and cylinder was replaced by an oscillating disc. In 1849 Rennie employed George Daniell Bishopp as a foreman at their works, and he held an 1848 patent regarding this form of engine. Although the engines appear to have worked sufficiently well for several full scale trials, they had an inherent problem with their seals, and this appears to have been the main reason they were not a success.

A Rennie disc engine, with 27 inch disc, was fitted in HMS Minx in 1849, but as a supplementary engine, the original engines still being in situ. A working model of the Rennie disc engine was exhibited by George and John Rennie at the 1851 Great exhibition.

== Rail Locomotives ==
In addition to the stationary engines to create the vacuum for the South Devon atmospheric railway, the company had other involvement with the railways. John Rennie was involved with the surveying of a route for the London and Brighton Railway (L&BR), which was in competition with a route by Stephenson. Among the engines purchased by the railway are several listed as supplied by G. and J. Rennie (as opposed to J. and G. Rennie). It appears the brothers formed a separate company for this activity to keep the books separate.

Five 2-2-2 locomotives were built for the London and Southampton Railway:

- Deer, delivered June 1838
- Garnet, delivered June 1838
- London, delivered October 1838
- Victoria, delivered November 1838
- Reed, delivered November 1838

Problems were experienced and all of them were sent to William Fairbairn & Sons in February 1841 for reconstruction.

Rennie supplied two 2-2-2 locomotives to the London and Croydon Railway (L&CR):

- Croydon, delivered August 1838, numbered 2 by 1842. Withdrawn April 1845.
- Archimedes, delivered May 1839, numbered 6 by 1842. Withdrawn April 1845.

In May 1842, both were transferred to the Croydon & Dover Joint Committee (C&DJC), which was a co-operation of the L&CR and the South Eastern Railway (SER) to pool rolling stock; the L&BR joined the pool in March 1844, when it became the Brighton, Croydon and Dover Joint Committee (BC&DJC). At the end of January 1846, the BC&DJC was dissolved, and both were transferred to the SER. Throughout these changes of ownership, the numbers 2 and 6 were retained.

The three 2-2-2 locomotives supplied to the L&BR were:

- No. 6 Eagle, delivered April 1840. Transferred to the BC&DJC in March 1844 and renumbered 47. Transferred to the L&BR January 1846 and renumbered 14. Passed to the London, Brighton and South Coast Railway (LB&SCR) in July 1846, renumbered 9 in 1848. Rebuilt as 2-2-2WT in 1849. Withdrawn December 1855.
- No. 7 Vulture, delivered May 1840. Transferred to the BC&DJC in March 1844 and renumbered 48. Transferred to the L&BR January 1846 and renumbered 15. Passed to the LB&SCR in July 1846, renumbered 10 in 1848. Rebuilt as 2-2-2WT in 1849. Withdrawn March 1853.
- No. 26 Satellite, delivered December 1841. Transferred to the BC&DJC in March 1844 and renumbered 49. Transferred to the L&BR January 1846 and renumbered 13. Passed to the LB&SCR in July 1846, renumbered 8 in 1848. Rebuilt as 2-2-2WT in 1849. Withdrawn June 1855.

The only broad-gauge locomotives built by Rennie were two of the GWR Firefly Class:

- Mazeppa, delivered March 1841. Ceased work March 1868, withdrawn July 1870.
- Arab, delivered May 1841. Withdrawn July 1870.

Two more standard-gauge 2-2-2 locomotives were supplied to the C&DJC:

- No. 27 Man of Kent, delivered December 1842. Transferred to the SER January 1846, retaining number. Withdrawn 1860.
- No. 28 Kentish Man, delivered February 1843. Transferred to the L&BR January 1846 and renumbered 16. Passed to the LB&SCR in July 1846, renumbered 11 in 1848. Withdrawn 1855.

Other locomotives were built for railways in Germany.
