= James Fenton (engineer) =

Scottish engineer

- Born: 1815
- Died: 1863 (aged 47–48)

James Fenton (1815–1863) was a Scottish engineer.

He was engineer (1841–45) on the Manchester and Leeds Railway, and Leeds and Thirsk Railway (1845–46), In 1846 he formed Fenton, Craven and Company (later as E. B. Wilson and Company) at the Railway Foundry, Leeds, UK, and in 1851 joined the Low Moor Ironworks Company in Bradford, as a consulting engineer.

== Biography ==
James Fenton was born at Dunkenny, near Forfar, Angus, on 29 August 1815. He was apprenticed and trained in mechanical and civil engineering under James Cook & Co. of Glasgow, and Mr. Blackadder respectively. In 1837 he began work under I.K. Brunel during the construction of the Great Western Railway.

In 1841 he became Locomotive Superintendent and engineer of the Manchester and Leeds Railway, leaving in 1845 to join the Leeds and Thirsk Railway as engineer, then under construction. He left the Leeds and Thirsk before the completion of the line, and began work at the Railway Foundry, Leeds, where his work included the production of the Jenny Lind locomotive type based on designs by John Gray, and the construction of the pier of New Holland Pier railway station.

Fenton was a founder of the Institution of Mechanical Engineers, active in its activities and a vice-president.

In 1851 Fenton left the Railway Foundry, and joined the Low Moor Company of Bradford.

== Death ==
He died on 22 April 1863 in Leamington after contracting a cold on business in London, and was buried in Low Moor on 27 April 1863.
