= Railway Foundry =

Railway engineering workshop in England

The Railway Foundry, Leeds, was a railway engineering workshop off Pearson Street, in Hunslet, Leeds, West Yorkshire, England. It was established in 1838 by Shepherd and Todd. Charles Todd had been a partner in Todd, Kitson & Laird but left to set up his own business in 1838, setting up the Railway Foundry with a Mr. Shepherd to build locomotives and rolling stock.

== Locomotives ==
The first order came in 1839 and in the following two years, they built a number of locomotives for the North Midland Railway, the Manchester and Leeds Railway and for one in France. These were either small four-coupled or 2-2-2 locos. However, in 1840 they built two six-foot singles for the Hull and Selby Railway. The latter had Gray's patent dog-leg valve gear and were, apart from another built experimentally by the Haigh Foundry, among the first to use expansive working. Further engines were made for the Hull and Selby, two 0-6-0s and two singles for the York and North Midland Railway.

== Formation of Fenton, Craven and Company ==
Todd left the partnership in 1844 to be replaced by E.B. Wilson. He in turn left after a year and the company was taken over in 1846 by James Fenton, formerly a partner in Fenton, Murray and Jackson to become Fenton, Craven and Company.

The company continued building mostly Stephenson long boiler locomotives, some 2-2-2 followed by outside-cylindered 2-4-0 with the firebox behind the wheels. They were extremely unstable due to the long overhang at each end. The six-coupled engines for goods work were more successful since speed was not a requirement.

== Formation of E. B. Wilson and Company ==
At the end of 1846 the partnership collapsed, Fenton staying with the company with E. B. Wilson, who returned to form a new company E. B. Wilson and Company.

== Railway Foundry, Barnsley ==
The Railway Foundry, Barnsley, was a separate concern, owned by Mr Longbottom. A previous version of this page said that he was the father of Luke Longbottom, who was Locomotive Superintendent of the North Staffordshire Railway from 1882 to 1902. However this seems unlikely as Luke Longbottom said in an interview with the Railway Magazine that his father was employed as engineer of Marshall's flax mill in Leeds for fifty years and this is backed up by the census returns for Leeds

== See also ==
- Round Foundry, Leeds
