= List of Craven locomotives =

The following list gives details of locomotives designed by John Chester Craven for the London, Brighton and South Coast Railway between his appointment in 1847 and his retirement in January 1870.

Unlike other locomotive engineers, Craven did not believe in standardisation, but designed individual locomotives for particular jobs.

== Locomotives built by Craven ==
No.	Class	Whyte Type	Builder	Build Date	Rebuilt As	Date	Renumber	On	Withdrawn	Notes
14	—	2-2-2WT	Brighton Works	1852/05					1877/04	Named Merton, May 1871. Renumbered 60, 1874 and 278 1875
26	—	2-2-2WT	Brighton Works	1852/06					1875/11	
24	—	2-2-2	Brighton Works	1853/04					1868/04	Removed from stock February 1866
10	Jenny Lind	2-2-2	Brighton Works	1853/09			290	1874/03	1877/05	
23	Jenny Lind	2-2-2	Brighton Works	1854/07			266	1876/09	1876/09	
38	Jenny Lind	2-2-2	Brighton Works	1854/07					1873/10	
41	Jenny Lind	2-2-2	Brighton Works	1853/07					1873/04	
48	Jenny Lind	2-2-2	Brighton Works	1853/01					1870/10	
44	—	0-6-0	Brighton Works	1854/01					1871/06	
46	—	0-6-0	Brighton Works	1854/03					1871/05	
117	—	0-6-0	Sharp, Stewart	1854/06	0-6-0	1870/02	362	1877/08	1888/03	Bought from Manchester Sheffield and Lincolnshire Railway. Renumbered 398 1887/03
121	—	0-6-0	Sharp, Stewart	1854/06	0-6-0	1870/03	370	1878/07	1886/12	Bought from Manchester Sheffield and Lincolnshire Railway
6	—	2-4-0	Sharp, Stewart	1855/07			289	1873/12	1876/11	Renumbered 390 1879/06
13	—	2-4-0	Sharp, Stewart	1854/11					1874/10	
40	—	2-4-0	Sharp, Stewart	1854/11			260	1878/01	1891/09	Renumbered 464 1891/09
42	—	2-4-0	Sharp, Stewart	1856/04			355	1877/06	1879/06	
100	—	2-4-0	Sharp, Stewart	1856/04			257	1875/03	1881/11	Renumbered 505 1881/10
116	—	2-4-0	Sharp, Stewart	1855/05			356	1877/06	1879/06	
16	—	2-4-0	Brighton Works	1854/06					1875/01	
20	—	2-4-0	Brighton Works	1854/09			264	1875/06	1879/09	
1	Croydon Engine	2-4-0	Brighton Works	1854/11			285	1873/12	1875/01	
2	Croydon Engine	2-4-0	Brighton Works	1854/12			286	1873/12	1880/05	
3	Long boiler	2-4-0	Brighton Works	1855/02			287	1873/12	1876/10	
5	Long boiler	2-4-0	Brighton Works	1855/03			288	1873/12	1876/08	
8	Long boiler	2-4-0	Brighton Works	1855/08			291	1874/03	1876/01	
9	Long boiler	2-4-0	Brighton Works	1855/08			293	1874/03	1876/01	
45	Long boiler	2-4-0	Brighton Works	1862/05			277	1877/06	1880/05	Renumbered 409 1879/12
99	Long boiler	2-4-0	Brighton Works	1862/05			299	1874/12	1876/07	
120	Long boiler	2-4-0	Brighton Works	1857/09			297	1874/05	1876/05	
124	Long boiler	2-4-0	Brighton Works	1858/03					1871/04	
145	Long boiler	2-4-0	Brighton Works	1861/06			503	1880/10	1880/11	
11	Saddle Tanks	0-4-2ST	Brighton Works	1855/07			294	1874/03	1877/04	
22	Saddle Tanks	0-4-2ST	Brighton Works	1855/08					1874/02	
12	West End Tanks	2-4-0WT	Brighton Works	1858/05	2-4-0WT	1868/05	131	1859/04	1889/01	Renumbered 378 1878/09
15	West End Tanks	2-4-0WT	Brighton Works	1858/04	2-4-0WT	1866/11	277	1874/12	1877/05	
105	West End Tanks	2-4-0WT	Brighton Works	1858/02	2-4-0WT	1862/08	291	1880/01	1880/01	
127	West End Tanks	2-4-0WT	Brighton Works	1858/05	2-4-0WT	1864/12	106	1881/12	1881/12	Renumbered 292 1876/10 and 367 1877/11
128	West End Tanks	2-4-0WT	Brighton Works	1858/06					1871/03	
129	West End Tanks	2-4-0WT	Brighton Works	1858/05	2-4-0WT	1867/11	376	1878/09	1880/10	Renumbered 376 1878/09
118	Large goods	0-6-0	Brighton Works	1856/08					1876/08	
119	Large goods	0-6-0	Brighton Works	1856/10					1876/12	
134	Large goods	0-6-0	Brighton Works	1859/09			384	1878/12	1885/07	Sold to West Lancashire Railway
143	Large goods	0-6-0	Brighton Works	1861/02					1879/04	
110	Large goods	0-6-0	Brighton Works	1862/12			353	1877/02	1879/10	
102	Small goods	0-6-0	Brighton Works	1859/04			259	1875/03	1883/11	Renumbered 311 1875/11
107	Small goods	0-6-0	Brighton Works	1859/05			500	1881/04	1882/05	
135	Small goods	0-6-0	Brighton Works	1859/08			281	1876/11	1877/04	Renumbered 394 1879/10
141	Small goods	0-6-0	Brighton Works	1860/10					1878/03	
142	Small goods	0-6-0	Brighton Works	1860/11					1877/11	
103	Small goods	0-6-0	Slaughter, Gruning & Co.	1860/01					1875/11	
114	Small goods	0-6-0	Slaughter, Gruning & Co.	1860/01					1873/08	
122	Wilson singles	2-2-2	Brighton Works	1857/07					1874/04	
123	Wilson singles	2-2-2	Brighton Works	1857/07					1876/11	
125	Ventnor	2-2-2	Brighton Works	1857/07			372	1878/07	1880/07	
126	Ventnor	2-2-2	Brighton Works	1857/07			373	1878/07	1880/12	
132	Lancing	2-2-2	Brighton Works	1858/12					1875/08	
146	Lancing	2-2-2	Brighton Works	1861/07			451	1880/10	1886/04	
147	Lancing	2-2-2	Brighton Works	1861/07			452	1880/10	1886/04	
108	—	2-2-2	Brighton Works	1859/12			285	1876/11	1884/01	Renumbered 391 1879/06
133	—	2-2-2	Brighton Works	1859/10			405	1878/11	1879/05	
146	—	2-2-2	Brighton Works	1860/07			385	1879/02	1884/11	
147	—	2-2-2	Brighton Works	1860/08			386	1879/02	1879/08	
137	—	2-2-2	Brighton Works	1859/07			382	1878/11	1884/01	
138	—	2-2-2	Brighton Works	1859/07			383	1878/12	1884/06	
25	Rebuild	2-2-2ST	Brighton Works	1860/06	0-4-2ST	1869/05	268	1875/09	1884/01	Renumbered 399 1880/05
59	Rebuild	2-4-0	Brighton Works	1860/06	2-4-0T	1872/05	276	1875/10	1880/03	Renumbered 410 1879/12 Named Leatherhead 1872
84	Rebuild	2-2-2	Brighton Works	1861/10			48	1870/12	1880/05	Renumbered 274 1876/10 and 412 1879/12
86	Rebuild	2-2-2	Brighton Works	1862/08			49	1870/07	1875/02	
89	Rebuild	2-4-0	Brighton Works	1862/09			61	1870/05	1875/07	
97	Rebuild	2-4-0	Brighton Works	1861/1					1874/07	
101	—	2-4-0	Brighton Works	1858/09			258	1875/03	1885/07	Renumbered 506 1881/10 Named Rouen
148	—	2-4-0	Brighton Works	1862/04			453	1871/1	1886/10	Named Ryde 1871
153	—	2-2-2	Brighton Works	1862/08			164	1872/05	1891/01	Named Spithead 1872
154	—	2-2-2	Brighton Works	1862/08			165	1871/11	1890/04	Named Southsea 1871
11	—	0-4-2ST	Brighton Works	1855/07			294	1874/03	1877/04	
12	—	0-4-2ST	Brighton Works	1855/08					1877/02	
130	—	2-4-0T	Brighton Works	1858/10			377	1878/09	1879/03	
136	—	4-4-0ST	Brighton Works	1859/06					1874/09	
144	—	4-4-0WT	Brighton Works	1861/06	2-4-0T	1868/08			1877/11	
4	—	2-2-2ST	Brighton Works	1862/04	2-4-0ST	1869/01	104	1873/12	1882/05	Renumbered 295 1876/10 and 365 1877/10
32	—	2-2-2ST	Brighton Works	1862/06	2-4-0ST	1866/10	275	1876/03	1882/11	Renumbered 411 1879/12
98	—	2-2-2T	Brighton Works	1859/12			298	1874/11	1879/09	Renumbered 214 1878/05 Named Seaford
51		2-4-0T	Brighton Works	1869/11			132	1876/12	1885/01	Renumbered 379 1878/09
109		2-4-0T	Brighton Works	1869/12			352	1877/02	1885/05	
170		2-4-0T	Brighton Works	1863/12					1878/05	
171		2-4-0T	Brighton Works	1863/12					1879/10	
212	Sth London Tanks	0-4-2T	Brighton Works	1865/07			413	1880/03	1881/05	
213	Sth London Tanks	0-4-2T	Brighton Works	1865/07			414	1880/03	1882/09	
214	Sth London Tanks	0-4-2WT	Brighton Works	1865/12	0-4-2T	1878/05	369	1878/05	1882/09	
215	Sth London Tanks	0-4-2WT	Brighton Works	1865/12	0-4-0T	1878/05	371	1878/05	1884/06	Renumbered 497 1881/04
17	Sth London Tanks	0-4-2T	Brighton Works	1866/03			261	1875/04	1886/11	Renumbered 465 1881/10
216	Sth London Tanks	0-4-2T	Brighton Works	1866/04			376	1880/05	1886/10	Renumbered 498 1881/04
217	Sth London Tanks	0-4-2T	Brighton Works	1866/02			377	1883/03	1885/07	
218	Sth London Tanks	0-4-2T	Brighton Works	1866/03					1884/11	
230	Sth London Tanks	0-4-2T	Brighton Works	1866/1					1881/06	
231	Sth London Tanks	0-4-4T	Brighton Works	1866/11			466	1881/05	1885/11	
222	Egmont	2-2-2T	Brighton Works	1866/05					1882/01	Named Egmont 1874
223	Egmont	2-2-2T	Brighton Works	1866/05					1884/01	
228	Willow Walk Shunter	0-6-0ST	Brighton Works	1866/09			351	1879/03	1882/12	Sold to Alexandra Docks & Rly Co.
229	Willow Walk Shunter	0-6-0ST	Brighton Works	1866/09			353	1879/03	1882/12	Sold to Alexandra Docks & Rly Co.
52	Willow Walk Shunter	0-6-0WT	Brighton Works	1868/03			269	1875/10	1893/10	Renumbered 395 1880/04
58	Willow Walk Shunter	0-6-0WT	Brighton Works	1868/12			273	1875/09	1885/09	Renumbered 398 1880/04. Sold to Alexandra Docks & Rly Co.
155	—	0-4-2	Brighton Works	1862/08			504	1880/12	1882/06	
156	—	0-4-2	Brighton Works	1862/08					1878/05	
164	—	0-4-2	Brighton Works	1863/11			299	1876/10	1884/11	Renumbered 368 1878/11
165	—	0-4-2	Brighton Works	1863/11			297	1876/10	1885/09	Renumbered 364 1877/10
166	—	0-4-2	Brighton Works	1863/12	0-4-2ST	1864/03			1881/10	
167	—	0-4-2	Brighton Works	1863/12	0-4-2ST	1864/05			1873/03	
54	Small goods	0-6-0	Brighton Works	1864/09			136	1875/12	1885/11	Renumbered 381 1878/11
219	Small goods	0-6-0	Manning Wardle	1866/03			386	1879/12	1885/10	Sold
220	Small goods	0-6-0	Manning Wardle	1866/03					1887/11	
157	Standard Goods	0-6-0	Brighton Works	1863/02					1876/11	
158	Standard Goods	0-6-0	Brighton Works	1863/02					1878/04	
168	Standard Goods	0-6-0	Brighton Works	1863/12			477	1894/10	1896/09	
169	Standard Goods	0-6-0	Brighton Works	1863/12					1893/07	
192	Standard Goods	0-6-0	Brighton Works	1864/08			382	1888/10	1893/12	Renumbered 475 1893/10
193	Standard Goods	0-6-0	Brighton Works	1864/08			383	1888/10	1893/12	Renumbered 476 1893/10
206	Standard Goods	0-6-0	Brighton Works	1864/12			271	1875/11	1896/09	Renumbered 396 1880/05 and 476 1896/03
207	Standard Goods	0-6-0	Brighton Works	1864/12			272	1875/12	1895/04	Renumbered 397 1880/04
208	Standard Goods	0-6-0	Brighton Works	1865/02			380	1878/11	1893/07	Renumbered 474 1893/06
209	Standard Goods	0-6-0	Brighton Works	1865/02			387	1879/06	1895/12	Renumbered 463 1894/03
210	Standard Goods	0-6-0	Brighton Works	1865/03			388	1879/06	1896/10	Renumbered 464 1894/03
211	Standard Goods	0-6-0	Brighton Works	1865/03			394	1880/02	1895/04	
221	Standard Goods	0-6-0	Brighton Works	1866/04			389	1885/06	1886/04	
190	Standard Goods	0-6-0	Brighton Works	1867/11					1885/01	
191	Standard Goods	0-6-0	Brighton Works	1867/11					1884/08	
224	Standard Goods	0-6-0	Brighton Works	1866/06			390	1885/01	1895/10	Renumbered 465 1894/03
225	Standard Goods	0-6-0	Brighton Works	1866/07			391	1885/01	1896/04	Renumbered 466 1894/03, 514 1898/03 and 614 1899/05
226	Standard Goods	0-6-0	Brighton Works	1866/08			392	1885/01	1895/10	Renumbered 467 1894/03
227	Standard Goods	0-6-0	Brighton Works	1866/09			393	1885/01	1895/04	
249	Standard Goods	0-6-0	Slaughter & Co.	1868/09			468	1881/10	1898/05	Renumbered 515 1898/03
250	Standard Goods	0-6-0	Slaughter & Co.	1868/09			469	1881/10	1894/08	
251	Standard Goods	0-6-0	Slaughter & Co.	1868/10			470	1881/10	1896/04	
252	Standard Goods	0-6-0	Slaughter & Co.	1868/10			471	1881/10	1896/04	
253	Standard Goods	0-6-0	Slaughter & Co.	1868/11			472	1881/10	1896/04	
254	Standard Goods	0-6-0	Slaughter & Co.	1868/11			473	1881/10	1894/08	
149	Standard Passenger	2-4-0	Brighton Works	1862/02			454	1880/1	1884/08	
150	Standard Passenger	2-4-0	Brighton Works	1862/02			455	1880/1	1883/04	Sold West Lancs Rly
151	Standard Passenger	2-4-0	Brighton Works	1862/02			120	1874/11	1883/04	Renumbered 363 1877/08. Sold West Lancs Rly
152	Standard Passenger	2-4-0	Brighton Works	1862/04			456	1880/12	1887/11	
159	Standard Passenger	2-4-0	Brighton Works	1863/04					1884/06	
160	Standard Passenger	2-4-0	Brighton Works	1863/04					1884/06	
174	Standard Passenger	2-4-0	Brighton Works	1864/06			488	1881/07	1889/11	
175	Standard Passenger	2-4-0	Brighton Works	1864/06			455	1890/12	1891/06	
176	Standard Passenger	2-4-0	Brighton Works	1864/07					1890/05	
177	Standard Passenger	2-4-0	Brighton Works	1864/07					1889/06	Named Hayling 1872
178	Standard Passenger	2-4-0	Beyer, Peacock & Co.	1864/03					1889/11	
179	Standard Passenger	2-4-0	Beyer, Peacock & Co.	1864/03					1887/10	
180	Standard Passenger	2-4-0	Beyer, Peacock & Co.	1864/04					1887/10	
181	Standard Passenger	2-4-0	Beyer, Peacock & Co.	1864/04					1886/11	
182	Standard Passenger	2-4-0	Beyer, Peacock & Co.	1864/04					1887/05	
183	Standard Passenger	2-4-0	Beyer, Peacock & Co.	1864/04					1888/02	
184	Standard Passenger	2-4-0	Beyer, Peacock & Co.	1864/04					1888/02	
185	Standard Passenger	2-4-0	Beyer, Peacock & Co.	1864/04			465	1889/09	1890/10	
186	Standard Passenger	2-4-0	Beyer, Peacock & Co.	1864/04					1887/04	
187	Standard Passenger	2-4-0	Beyer, Peacock & Co.	1864/05					1887/05	
188	Standard Passenger	2-4-0	Beyer, Peacock & Co.	1864/05					1887/03	
189	Standard Passenger	2-4-0	Beyer, Peacock & Co.	1864/05					1890/10	
12	Standard Passenger	2-4-0	Brighton Works	1868/11			124	1874/06	1886/04	Renumbered 371 1881/04
28	Standard Passenger	2-4-0	Brighton Works	1868/11			283	1876/04	1884/11	Renumbered 377 1879/09
242	Standard Passenger	2-4-0	Dubs & Co.	1867/04			457	1881/09	1891/10	
243	Standard Passenger	2-4-0	Dubs & Co.	1867/04			458	1881/09	1891/12	
244	Standard Passenger	2-4-0	Dubs & Co.	1867/04			459	1881/09	1895/10	
245	Standard Passenger	2-4-0	Dubs & Co.	1867/04			460	1881/09	1894/05	
246	Standard Passenger	2-4-0	Dubs & Co.	1867/04			461	1881/09	1894/09	
247	Standard Passenger	2-4-0	Dubs & Co.	1867/04			462	1881/09	1894/11	
24	Small single	2-2-2	Brighton Works	1864/06			ex-190	1867/11	1882/09	Renumbered 267 1875/09 and 485 1881/10
29	Small single	2-2-2	Brighton Works	1865/09			293	1876/10	1885/09	Renumbered 366 1877/10
30	Small single	2-2-2	Brighton Works	1865/09			19	1874/01	1886/05	Renumbered 263 1875/06 and 486 1881/10
31	Small single	2-2-2	Brighton Works	1862/12			259	1876/05	1880/05	
33	Small single	2-2-2	Brighton Works	1864/06			ex-191	1867/11	1882/09	Renumbered 280 1876/05 and 392 1879/09
161	Small single	2-2-2	Brighton Works	1863/09					1885/01	
232	Small single	2-2-2	Brighton Works	1866/10			485	1884/06	1884/11	
233	Small single	2-2-2	Brighton Works	1866/10			486	1881/08	1883/01	Sold West Lancs Rly
234	Small single	2-2-2	Brighton Works	1866/11			474	1881/04	1884/11	
235	Small single	2-2-2	Brighton Works	1866/11			475	1881/05	1883/01	
162	7′ Single	2-2-2	Brighton Works	1863/09		1872/12	1885/05	Named London		
163	7′ Single	2-2-2	Brighton Works	1863/10		1873/02	1888/01	Named Brighton		
172	Chichester	2-2-2	Brighton Works	1864/03		1870/05	1886/10	Named Chichester		
173	Chichester	2-2-2	Brighton Works	1864/03					1884/06	
194	6′ 6″ Single	2-2-2	Robert Stephenson & Co.	1864/10					1865/02	Sold Egyptian Government Railways
195	6′ 6″ Single	2-2-2	Robert Stephenson & Co.	1864/07			486	1887/11	1893/01	
196	6′ 6″ Single	2-2-2	Robert Stephenson & Co.	1864/07					1865/02	Sold Egyptian Government Railways
197	6′ 6″ Single	2-2-2	Robert Stephenson & Co.	1864/07					1865/02	Sold Egyptian Government Railways
198	6′ 6″ Single	2-2-2	Robert Stephenson & Co.	1864/07	2-4-0	1872/07			1872/07	Rebuilt to \'B\' class
199	6′ 6″ Single	2-2-2	Robert Stephenson & Co.	1864/08			489	1887/11	1892/06	
200	6′ 6″ Single	2-2-2	Robert Stephenson & Co.	1864/08			490	1887/11	1896/04	
201	6′ 6″ Single	2-2-2	Robert Stephenson & Co.	1864/10			111	1872/11	1893/03	Renumbered 197 1877/03 and 487 1887/11
202	6′ 6″ Single	2-2-2	Robert Stephenson & Co.	1864/10					1865/02	Sold Egyptian Government Railways
203	6′ 6″ Single	2-2-2	Robert Stephenson & Co.	1864/11	2-2-2	1871/04	503	1897/01	1899/02	
204	6′ 6″ Single	2-2-2	Robert Stephenson & Co.	1864/12	2-4-0	1872/01			1872/01	Rebuilt to \'B\' class
205	6′ 6″ Single	2-2-2	Robert Stephenson & Co.	1864/12			198	1864/12	1894/05	Renumbered 488 1887/11
194	Replacement Single	2-2-2	Brighton Works	1865/12			484	1888/06	1892/06	
196	Replacement Single	2-2-2	Brighton Works	1864/12			485	1888/05	1890/10	
197	Replacement Single	2-2-2	Brighton Works	1866/03			266	1876/12	1886/04	Renumbered 484 1881/10
202	Replacement Single	2-2-2	Brighton Works	1866/06			112	1872/07	1885/08	Renumbered 354 1877/02
236	6′ 6″ Single	2-2-2	Nasmyth Wilson	1867/04			476	1881/09	1889/11	
237	6′ 6″ Single	2-2-2	Nasmyth Wilson	1867/04			477	1881/09	1888/08	
238	6′ 6″ Single	2-2-2	Nasmyth Wilson	1867/05			478	1881/09	1891/10	
239	6′ 6″ Single	2-2-2	Nasmyth Wilson	1867/05			479	1881/09	1891/10	
240	6′ 6″ Single	2-2-2	Nasmyth Wilson	1867/06			480	1881/09	1894/05	
241	6′ 6″ Single	2-2-2	Nasmyth Wilson	1867/06			481	1881/09	1889/11	
127	6′ 6″ Single	2-2-2	Dodds & Son	1871/06			374	1878/09	1892/09	
128	6′ 6″ Single	2-2-2	Dodds & Son	1871/07			375	1878/09	1888/06	
255	Victoria	2-2-2	Brighton Works	1868/12			482	1881/10	1888/08	Named Hastings 1871
256	Victoria	2-2-2	Brighton Works	1868/12			483	1881/10	1891/02	Named \"Victoria\" 1871
248	—	2-4-0	Kitson & Co.	1868/02			463	1881/10	1891/11	Named \"Hove\", exhibited at the Exposition Universelle in 1867 at Paris
76	—	2-4-0	Kitson & Co.	1869/05			358	1877/06	1895/04	Renumbered 496 1886/04
27	—	0-4-2ST	Brighton Works	1868/08	0-4-0WT	1874/02	400	1877/11	1893/11	
—	—	0-6-0ST	Manning Wardle	1871/03					1874/02	sold

== Sources ==
- Bradley, D.L. (1969). Locomotives of the London Brighton and South Coast Railway: Part 1. Railway Correspondence and Travel Society.
