= Thomas Kirtley =

Thomas Kirtley (20 February 1811 – 16 November 1847) was an English railway engineer, and was the locomotive superintendent of the North Midland Railway and later the London, Brighton and South Coast Railway.

== Biography ==
He was born at Tanfield, County Durham, the son of a colliery owner, and elder brother of Matthew Kirtley (b. 1813). Thomas began his career as an engine driver on the Liverpool and Manchester Railway with his brother. He founded the locomotive builder Thomas Kirtley and Co. of Warrington in 1837, but this company failed in 1841. After briefly working for his brother on the Warrington and Newton Railway he was appointed locomotive superintendent of the North Midland Railway in 1843, but lost his role at the formation of the Midland Railway in May 1844 and served as an inspector. In 1845 he worked for the Trent Valley Railway for Thomas Brassey. In February 1847 he was appointed Locomotive Superintendent of the London, Brighton and South Coast Railway following the dismissal of John Gray, but nine months later he suffered a brain tumor and died.

Business positions
Preceded by John Gray	Locomotive Superintendent of the London, Brighton and South Coast Railway; February–November, 1847	Succeeded by John Chester Craven
