= Johann Georg Bodmer =

Swiss inventor (1786–1864)

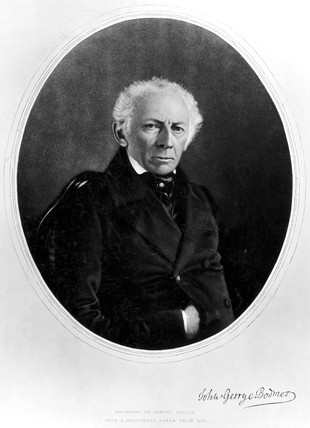
- c.1850s engraved by Samuel Bellin
- Born: 6 December 1786; Zürich, Switzerland
- Died: 30 May 1864 (aged 77); Zürich, Switzerland
- Engineering career
- Discipline: Civil and Mechanical Engineer

Johann Georg Bodmer (6 December 1786 – 30 May 1864) was a prolific Swiss inventor, making contributions to areas ranging from weaponry to steam engines, textile manufacture (machinery for wool spinning), and railroad construction.

== See also ==
- Benjamin Hick
- Benet Woodcroft
- List of early locomotives of the London Brighton and South Coast Railway
