= Round Foundry =

Building in Leeds, West Yorkshire, England

Coordinates: 53°47′29″N 1°33′11″W

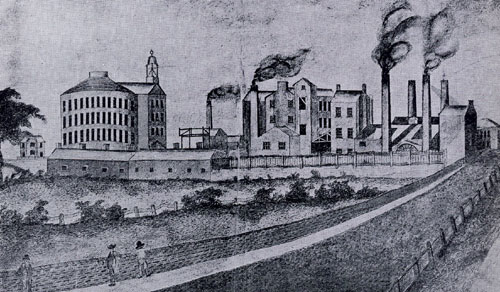
- Representation of the Round Foundry and rotunda from Water Lane in the 19th century.
- Interactive map of the Round Foundry area

General information
- Location: Holbeck, Leeds
- Construction started: 1795–1797

Design and construction
- Awards: Yorkshire Urban Renaissance Awards 2005; RICS Regeneration Awards 2005; RIBA Yorkshire White Rose Awards 2005.

Listed Building – Grade II

The Round Foundry is a former engineering works off Water Lane in Holbeck, Leeds, West Yorkshire, England. Founded in the late 18th century, the building was developed into the Round Foundry Media Centre in 2005.

== History ==
The Round Foundry was built in 1795–1797 by a partnership of James Fenton (1754–1834), Matthew Murray, David Wood and the financier William Lister, trading as Fenton, Murray and Wood, (later Fenton, Murray and Jackson). It was at the Round Foundry that Matthew Murray made his name as a great engineer. He produced textile machinery, steam engines and the first locomotives for the Middleton Railway including Salamanca. The Round Foundry developed to become one of the world's first specialist engineering foundries.

Disaster struck in 1875 when fire destroyed some of the original buildings, including the large rotunda that gave the Round Foundry its name. Some buildings were saved, the earliest of which dates from 1798. There are a total of 7 listed buildings in the Round Foundry complex. These include the Dry Sand Foundry, the Green Sand Foundry and 101 Water Lane.

== Redevelopment ==
The first phase of a £30 million redevelopment has led to the creation of the Round Foundry Media Centre, which provides office space for creative and digital media companies. This project also provides restaurants, bars and cafés set in a number of courtyards that try to retain as much of the character of the old foundry as is possible. This redevelopment project has won a number of architectural awards including; 'Best Creative Land Use' and 'Best Urban Centre', Yorkshire Urban Renaissance Awards 2005; 'Project of the Year', RICS Regeneration Awards 2005; 'Excellence in Architecture and Built Environment' and 'Best Commercial, Industrial and Retail', RIBA Yorkshire White Rose Awards 2005.

The Engine House, where the Salamanca was constructed, is now home to a number of businesses including KBW Barristers Chambers, ISG engineering and the Engine House Café.

== Foundry buildings ==
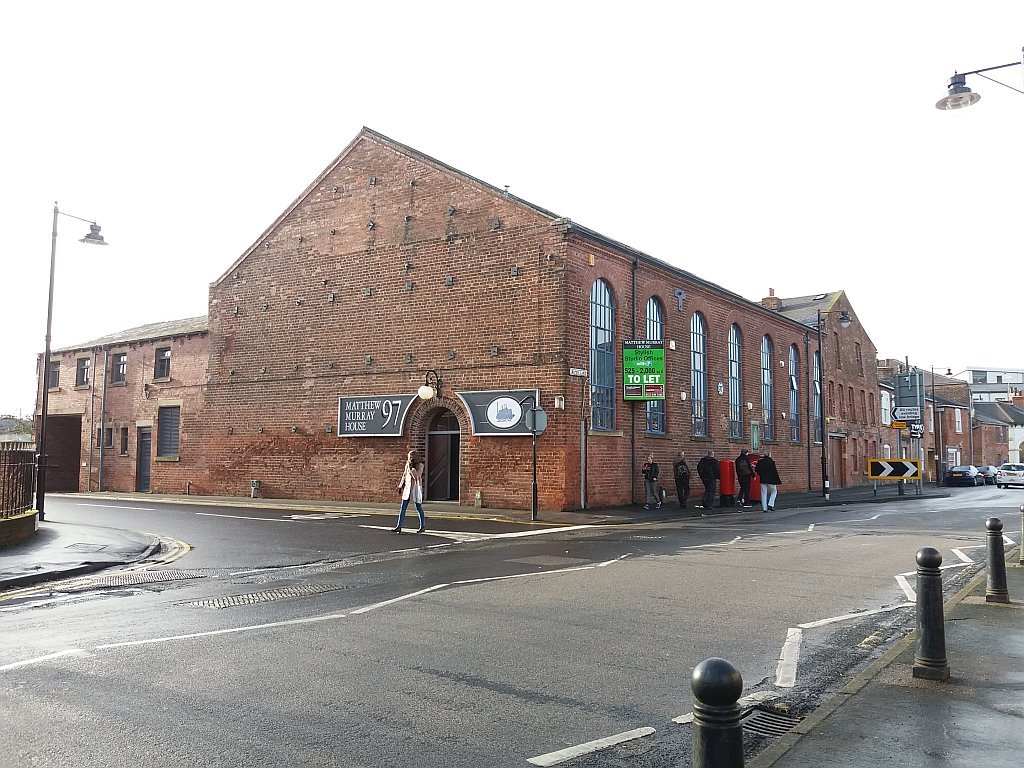
No. 97 Water Lane, originally a workshop forming part of the Round Foundry, built 1857–1877. Fenton, Murray and Jackson closed in 1843, this building built by Smith, Beacock and Tannett, machine tool manufacturers, who took over the site and renamed it Victorian Foundry. No. 99 in the distance.

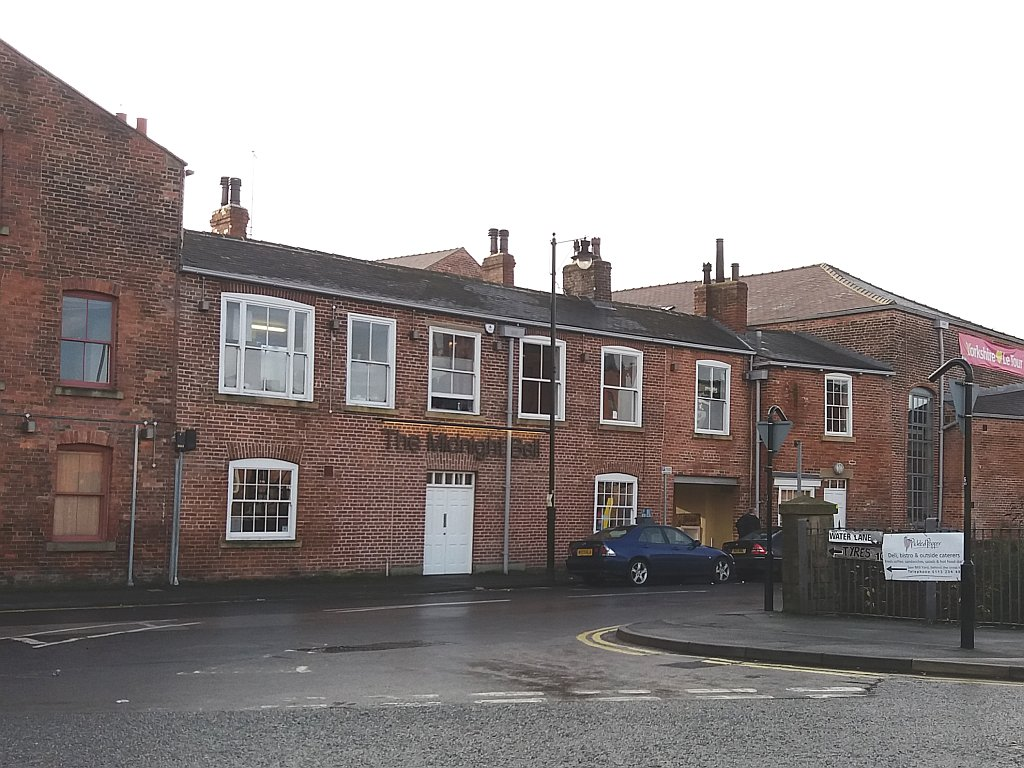
Water Lane and former Round Foundry buildings: No. 99 (left) considered the remains of the Green Sand foundry, built by Matthew Murray. No. 101 (centre) also believed to date from 1795 to 1802.

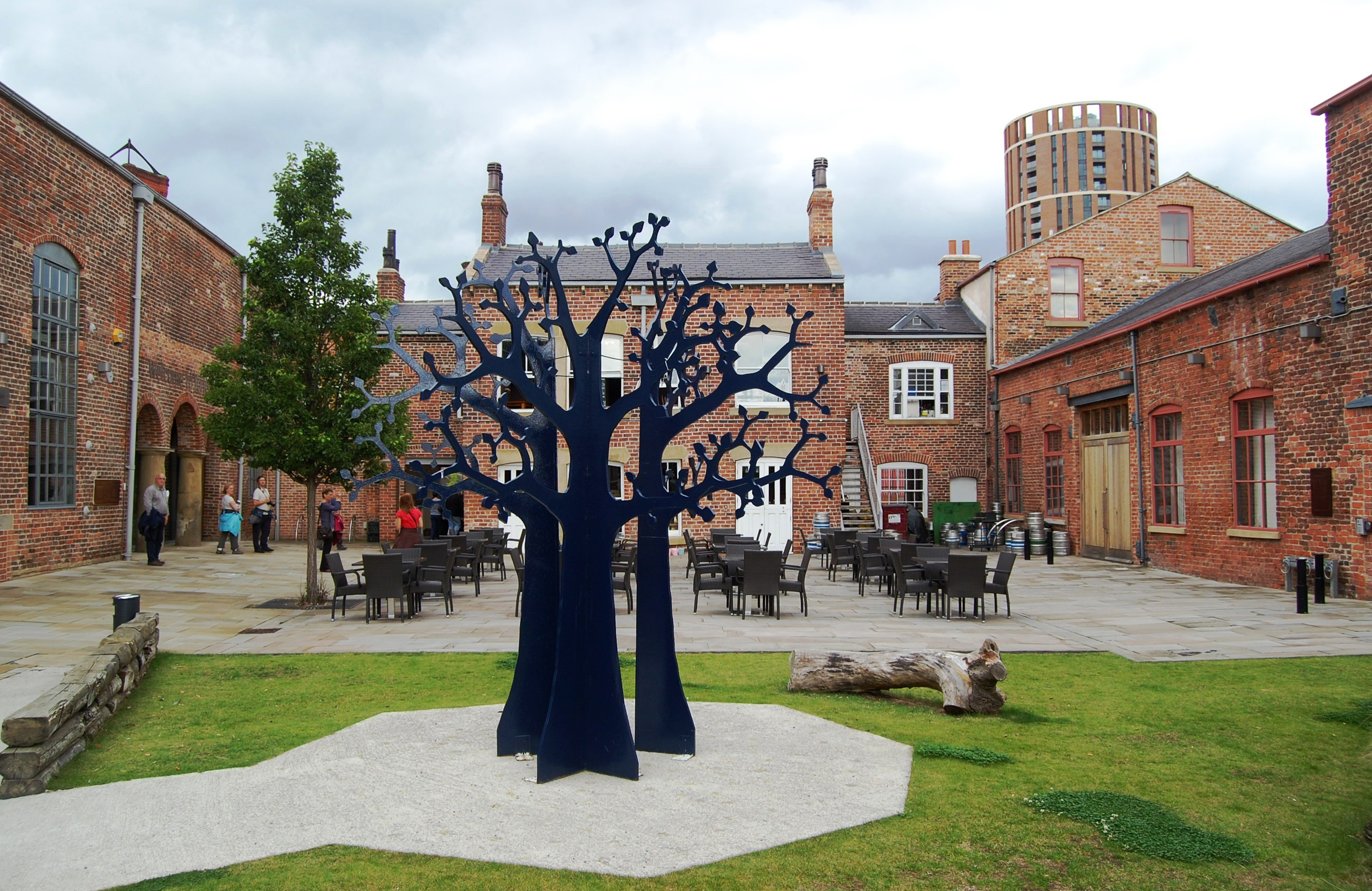
Foundry Square, No. 99 (right) with double doors. Dry Sand foundry (left).

== See also ==
- Railway Foundry
- Listed buildings in Leeds (City and Hunslet Ward - southern area)
