= Matthew Murray =

British steam engine and machine tool engineer and manufacturer (1765-1826)

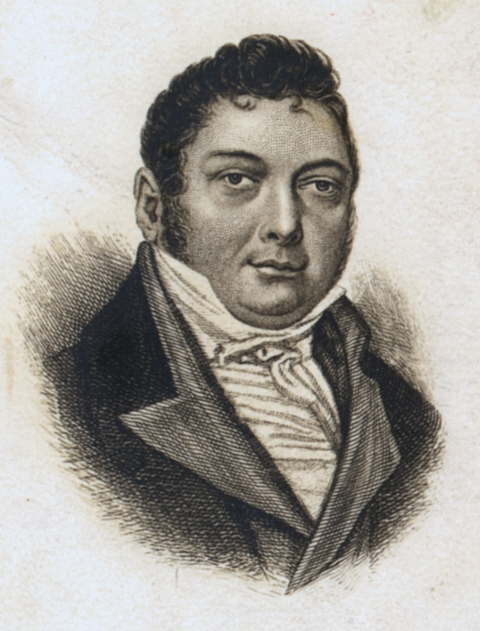
- Born: 1765; Newcastle upon Tyne, England
- Died: 20 February 1826 (aged 60)
- Resting place: Holbeck, Leeds, England
- Occupations: Engineer; Millwright; Machine tool builder Entrepreneur; Manager
- Known for: Steam engines Locomotives; Machine tools Textile machinery
- Notable work: Round Foundry; Hypocycloidal engine Salamanca locomotive 2-cylinder marine engine Hydraulic press

Matthew Murray (1765 – 20 February 1826) was an English steam engine and machine tool manufacturer, who designed and built the first commercially viable steam locomotive, the twin-cylinder Salamanca in 1812. He was an innovative designer in many fields, including steam engines, machine tools and machinery for the textile industry.

== Early years ==
Little is known about Matthew Murray's early years. He was born in Newcastle upon Tyne in 1765. He left school at fourteen and was apprenticed to be either a blacksmith or a whitesmith. In 1785, when he concluded his apprenticeship, he married Mary Thompson (1764–1836) of Whickham, County Durham. The following year he moved to Stockton and began work as a journeyman mechanic at the flax mill of John Kendrew in Darlington, where the mechanical spinning of flax had been invented.

Murray and his wife, Mary, had three daughters and a son, also called Matthew.

== Leeds ==
In 1789, due to a lack of trade in the Darlington flax mills, Murray and his family moved to Leeds to work for John Marshall, who was to become a prominent flax manufacturer. John Marshall had rented a small mill at Adel, for the purpose of manufacture but also to develop a pre-existing flax-spinning machine, with the aid of Matthew Murray. After some trial and error, to overcome the problem of breakages in the flax twine during the spinning of the flax, sufficient improvements were made to enable John Marshall to undertake the construction of a new mill at Holbeck in 1791, Murray was in charge of the installation. The installation included new flax-spinning machines of his own design, which Murray patented in 1790. In 1793 Murray took out a second patent on a design for "Instruments and Machines for Spinning Fibrous Materials". His patent included a carding engine and a spinning machine that introduced the new technique of "wet spinning" flax, which revolutionised the flax trade. Murray maintained the machinery for Marshall's mills and made improvements that pleased his employer. At this stage it seems that Murray was the chief engineer in the mill.

== Fenton, Murray and Wood ==
Industry in the Leeds area was developing fast and it became apparent that there was an opportunity for a firm of general engineers and millwrights to set up. Therefore, in 1795, Murray went into partnership with David Wood (1761–1820) and set up a factory at Mill Green, Holbeck. There were several mills in the vicinity and the new firm supplied machinery to them. The firm was so successful that in 1797 it moved to larger premises at Water Lane, Holbeck. The firm welcomed two new partners at this point; James Fenton (previously Marshall's partner) and William Lister (a millwright of Bramley, Leeds). The firm became known as Fenton, Murray and Wood. Murray was the technical innovator and in charge of obtaining orders; Wood was in charge of day-to-day running of the works; Fenton was the accountant.

== Steam engine manufacture ==
Although the firm still served the textile industry, Murray began to consider how the design of steam engines could be improved. He wanted to make them simpler, lighter, and more compact. He also wanted the steam engine to be a self-contained unit that could readily be assembled on site with pre-determined accuracy. Many existing engines suffered from faulty assembly, which took much effort to correct. One problem that Murray faced was that James Pickard had already patented the crank and flywheel method of converting linear motion to circular motion. Murray ingeniously got round this difficulty by introducing a Tusi couple hypocycloidal straight line mechanism. This consisted of a large fixed ring with internal teeth. Around the inside of this ring a smaller gear wheel, with half the outer one's diameter, would roll driven by the piston rod of the steam engine, which was attached to the gear's rim. As the piston rod moved backwards and forwards in a straight line, its linear motion would be converted into circular motion by the gear wheel. The gear wheel's bearing was attached to a crank on the flywheel shaft. When he used the hypocycloidal straight line mechanism he was able to build engines that were more compact and lightweight than previous ones. However, Murray ceased to use this type of motion as soon as Pickard's patent expired.

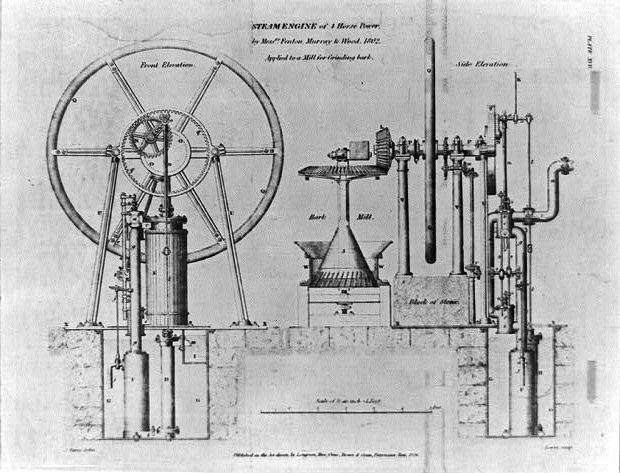
Technical drawing of a 4hp steam engine by Fenton, Murray & Wood, 1802. "Applied to a mill for grinding bark", by Joseph Wilson Lowry, after John Farey

In 1799 William Murdoch, who worked for the firm of Boulton and Watt, invented a new type of steam valve, called the D slide valve. This, in effect, slid backwards and forwards admitting steam to one end of the cylinder then the other. Matthew Murray improved the working of these valves by driving them with an eccentric gear attached to the rotating shaft of the engine.

Murray also patented an automatic damper that controlled the furnace draft depending on the boiler pressure, and he designed a mechanical hopper that automatically fed fuel to the firebox. Murray was the first to adopt the placing of the piston in a horizontal position in the steam engine. He expected very high standards of workmanship from his employees, and the result was that Fenton, Murray and Wood produced machinery of a very high precision. He designed a special planing machine for planing the faces of the slide valves. Apparently this machine was kept in a locked room, to which only certain employees were allowed access.

The Murray Hypocycloidal Engine in Thinktank museum, Birmingham, England, is the third-oldest working engine in the world, and the oldest working engine with a hypocycloidal straight line mechanism.

Several of Murray's big mill engines ran for over eighty years, and one of them, installed second-hand at the locomotive repair works at King's Cross, ran for over a century.

== The Round Foundry ==
As a result of the high quality of his steam engines, sales increased a great deal and it became apparent that a new engine assembly shop was required. Murray designed this himself, and produced a huge three-storeyed circular building known as the Round Foundry. This contained a centrally mounted steam engine to power all of the machines in the building. Murray also built a house for himself adjoining the works. The design of this was pioneering, as each room was heated by steam pipes, so that it became known locally as Steam Hall.

== Hostility of Boulton and Watt ==
The success that Fenton, Murray and Wood enjoyed because of the high quality of their workmanship attracted the hostility of competitors, Boulton and Watt. The latter firm sent employees William Murdoch and Abraham Storey to visit Murray, ostensibly on a courtesy visit, but in reality to spy on his production methods. Murray, rather foolishly, welcomed them, and showed them everything. On their return they informed their employers that Murray's casting work and forging work were much superior to their own, and efforts were made to adopt many of Murray's production methods. There was also an attempt by the firm of Boulton and Watt to obtain information from an employee of Fenton, Murray and Wood by bribery. Finally, James Watt jnr purchased land adjacent to the workshop in an attempt to prevent the firm from expanding.

Boulton and Watt successfully challenged two of Murray's patents. Murray's patent of 1801, for improved air pumps and other innovations, and of 1802, for a self-contained compact engine with a new type of slide valve, were contested and overturned. In both cases, Murray had made the mistake of including too many improvements together in the same patent. This meant that if any one improvement were found to have infringed a copyright, the whole patent would be invalidated.

Despite the manoeuvrings of Boulton and Watt, the firm of Fenton, Murray and Wood became serious rivals to them, attracting many orders.

== Middleton Railway ==
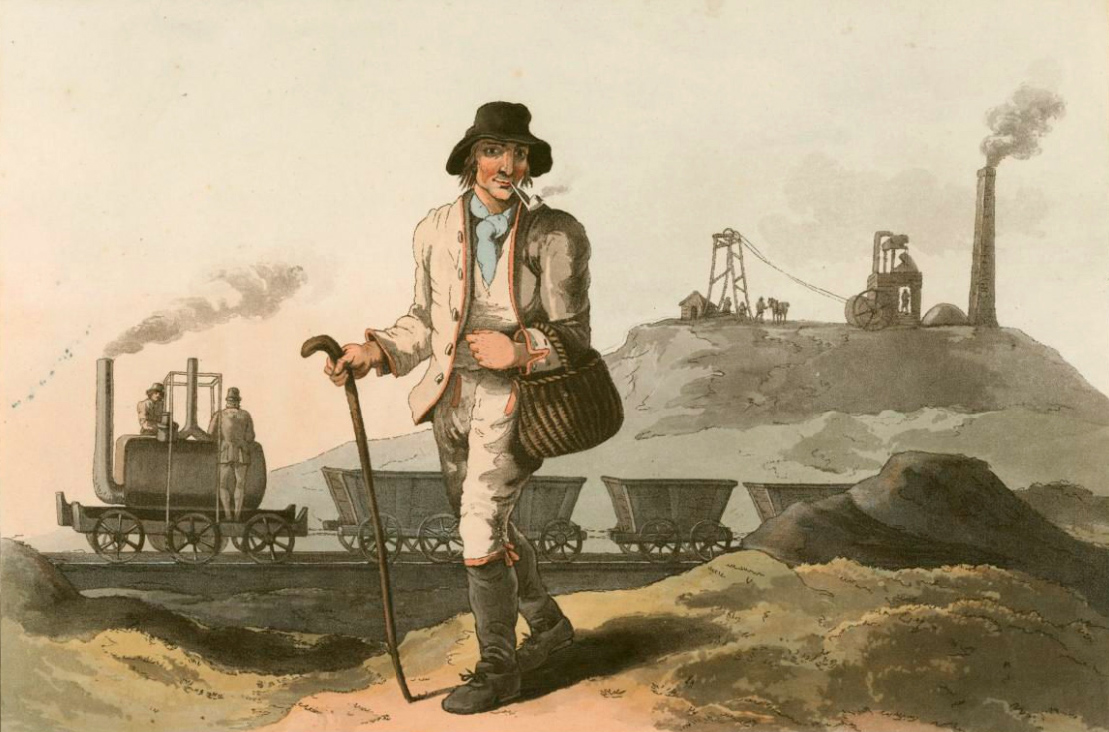
The Collier, aquatint by Robert Havell after George Walker, published in 1814, from Costumes of Yorkshire, showing Blenkinsop's rack locomotive Salamanca on the Middleton Railway. The image features the earliest known representation of a steam train.

In 1812 the firm supplied John Blenkinsop, manager of Brandling's Middleton Colliery, near Leeds, with the first twin-cylinder steam locomotive (Salamanca). This was the first commercially successful steam locomotive.

The double cylinder was Murray's invention; he paid Richard Trevithick a royalty for the use of his patented high pressure steam system, but improved upon it, using two cylinders rather than one to give a smoother drive.

Because only a lightweight locomotive could work on cast iron rails without breaking them, the total load they were capable of hauling was very much limited. In 1811, John Blenkinsop patented a toothed wheel and rack rail system. The toothed wheel was driven by connecting rods, and meshed with a toothed rail at one side of the track. This was the first rack railway, and had a gauge of 4 ft 1½ ins.

Once a system had been devised for making malleable iron rails, around 1819, the rack and pinion motion became unnecessary, apart from later use on mountain railways. However, until that time it enabled a small and lightweight locomotive to haul loads totalling at least 20 times its own weight. Salamanca was so successful that Murray made three more models. One of these was known as Lord Wellington, and the others are said to have been named Prince Regent and Marquis Wellington, though there is no known contemporary mention of those two names. The third locomotive intended for Middleton was sent, at Blenkinsop's request, to the Kenton and Coxlodge Colliery waggonway near Newcastle upon Tyne, where it appears to have been known as Willington. There it was seen by George Stephenson, who modelled his own locomotive Blücher on it, minus the rack drive, and therefore much less effective.

After two of the locomotives exploded, killing their drivers, and the remaining two were increasingly unreliable after at least 20 years’ hard labour, the Middleton colliery eventually reverted to horse haulage in 1835. Rumour has it that one remaining locomotive was preserved for some years at the colliery, but was eventually scrapped.

== Marine engines ==
In 1811 the firm made a Trevithick-pattern high-pressure steam engine for John Wright, a Quaker of Great Yarmouth, Norfolk. The engine was fitted to the paddle steamer l'Actif, running out of Yarmouth. The ship was a captured privateer that had been purchased from the government. Paddle wheels were fitted to it and driven by the new engine. The ship was renamed Experiment and the engine was very successful, eventually being transferred to another boat, The Courier.

In 1816 Francis B. Ogden, the United States Consul in Liverpool received two large twin-cylinder marine steam engines from Murray's firm. Ogden then patented the design as his own in America. It was widely copied there and used to propel the Mississippi paddle steamers.

== Textile innovations ==
Murray made important improvements to the machinery for heckling and spinning flax. Heckling was the preparation of flax for spinning by splitting and straightening the flax fibres. Murray's heckling machine gained him the gold medal of the Royal Society of Arts in 1809. At the time when these inventions were made the flax trade was on the point of expiring, the spinners being unable to produce yarn to a profit. The effect of his inventions was to reduce the cost of production, and improve the quality of the manufacture, thus establishing the British linen trade on a solid foundation. The production of flax-machinery became an important branch of manufacture at Leeds, large quantities being made for use at home as well as for exportation, giving employment to an increasing number of highly skilled mechanics.

== Hydraulic presses ==
In 1814 Murray patented a hydraulic press for baling cloth, in which the upper and lower tables approached each other simultaneously. He improved upon the hydraulic presses invented by Joseph Bramah, and in 1825 designed a huge press for testing chain cables. His press, built for the Navy Board, was 34 ft long and could exert a force of 1,000 tons. The press was completed just before Murray's death.

== Death ==
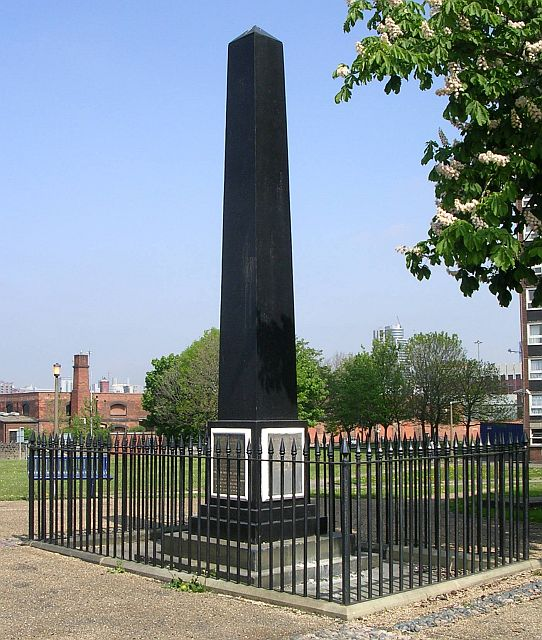
A memorial to Matthew Murray in Holbeck, Leeds

Matthew Murray died on 20 February 1826, at the age of sixty. He was buried in St Matthew's Churchyard in Holbeck, Leeds. His tomb was surmounted by a cast iron obelisk made at the Round Foundry. His firm survived until 1843. Several prominent engineers were trained there, including Benjamin Hick, Charles Todd, David Joy and Richard Peacock.

Murray's only son Matthew (c.1793–1835) served an apprenticeship at the Round Foundry and went to Russia; he founded an engineering business in Moscow, where he died age 42.

== Bibliography ==
- Chrimes, Mike (2002), "Matthew Murray", in Skempton, A. W.; et al. (eds.), A Biographical Dictionary of Civil Engineers, Vol 1, London, England: Thomas Telford on behalf of the Institution of Civil Engineers, pp. 461–462, ISBN 0-7277-2939-X.
- Cookson, G. (1994), "Early Textile Engineers in Leeds, 1780–1850", Publications of Thoresby Society, 4: 40–61.
- English, Walter (1969), The Textile Industry: An Account of the Early Inventions of Spinning, Weaving, and Knitting Machines, Harlow, Longmans, pp. 157–160, LCCN 72472630. Volume 4 of the series Industrial Archaeology.
- Kilburn Scott, Ernest (1928), Matthew Murray: Pioneer Engineer. Records from 1765 to 1826, Leeds, England: E. Jowett Ltd, OCLC 1686282.
- Roe, Joseph Wickham (1916), English and American Tool Builders, New Haven, Connecticut: Yale University Press, LCCN 16011753. Reprinted by McGraw-Hill, New York and London, 1926 (LCCN 27-24075); and by Lindsay Publications, Inc., Bradley, Illinois (ISBN 978-0-917914-73-7).
- Rolt, L.T.C. (1962), Great Engineers, London, England: G. Bell and Sons Ltd, OCLC 460171705.
- Smiles, Samuel (1901) [1861], Industrial Biography, London, England: John Murray.
- Warden, Alex J. (1967) [1864], The Linen Trade: Ancient and Modern, London, England: Longman, Green, Longman, Roberts & Green, pp. 690–692, OCLC 9078821.
