= George Rennie (engineer) =

British engineer

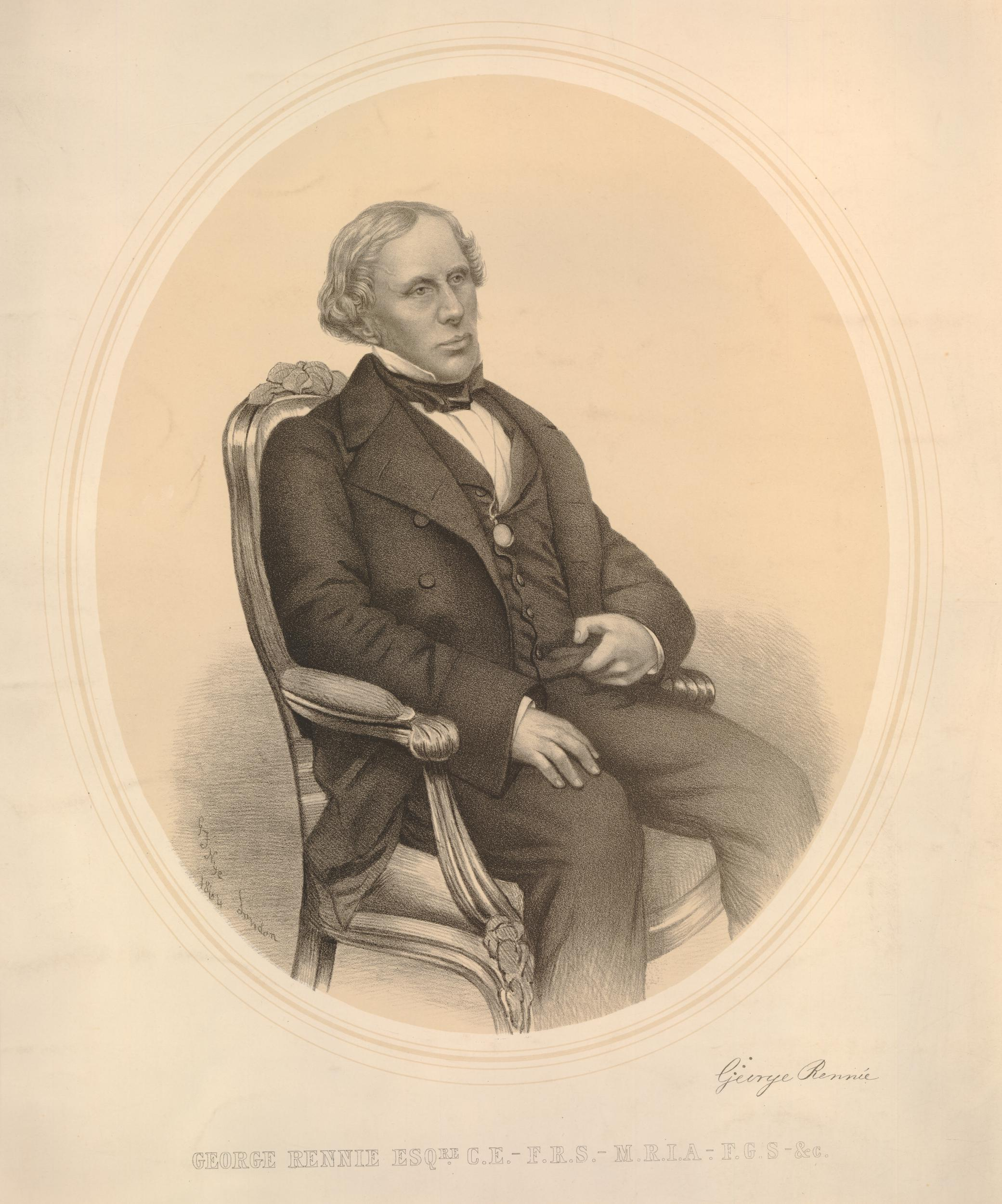
George Rennie

George Rennie (3 December 1791 – 30 March 1866) was an engineer born in London, England. He was the son of the Scottish engineer John Rennie the Elder and the brother of Sir John Rennie.

== Early life ==
Born in the parish of Christchurch, Blackfriars Road, Southwark, London, he was educated by Dr. Greenlaw at Isleworth, and was subsequently sent to St. Paul's School and to the University of Edinburgh. In 1811 he entered his father's office, where many great works were in progress. In 1818, on the recommendation of Sir Joseph Banks and James Watt, he was appointed inspector of machinery and clerk of the irons (i.e. dies) at the Royal Mint, which post he held for nearly eight years.

== J. & G. Rennie ==
On the death of his father in 1821 he entered into partnership with his younger brother John, as J. and G. Rennie, and for many years they were engaged in completing the vast undertakings originated by the elder Rennie. John concentrated on the civil engineering portion of the business, whereas George supervised the mechanical engineering. Nevertheless, about 1826 he was entrusted with the construction of the Grosvenor Bridge (Chester) over the Dee at Chester, from the designs of Harrison.

In 1825 the brothers were hired by the directors of the Liverpool and Manchester Railway as George Stephenson's original plan had been thrown out of Parliament due to inconsistent figures and measurements This was however, a technicality, as the reason for the Bill's failure was the political pressure applied by Lord Derby and Lord Sefton, since the original route encroached on, or near, their estates on the outskirts of Liverpool. So a new route was required. However, the brothers were too busy with existing work, so they subcontracted the work to Charles Blacker Vignoles, and it was he who plotted and surveyed a new route, which was successful in its passage through Parliament, and it the route still used to this day. As soon as the Bill received Royal Assent on 5 May 1826, the Directors wished to appoint the Rennie brothers as principal engineers for the building of the railway, but no agreement could be made over the amount of time the brothers would commit to attending site, and also which other engineers they were prepared to work with on the project, so the Directors offered the job back to George Stephenson.

He had considerable practice as a railway engineer, and made plans for lines to connect Birmingham and Liverpool, the Vale of Clwyd line, the railway from Mons to Manage in Belgium, and the Namur and Liege railway, of which he was appointed chief engineer in 1846.

== Mechanical engineering ==
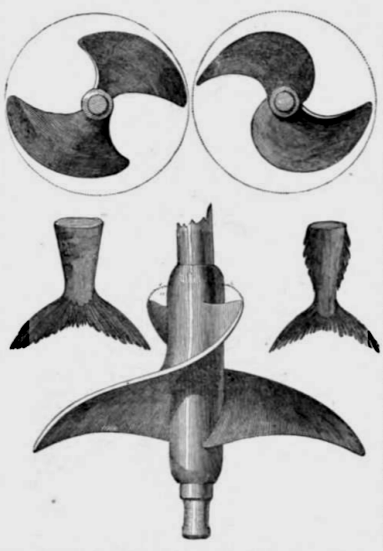
Screw-propeller invented by George Rennie imitating the form of a tail fin

George Rennie's genius was chiefly mechanical, and he superintended the manufacturing business of the firm in Holland Street, where a great variety of machinery was turned out, including the first biscuit-making machinery, corn and chocolate mills for Deptford victualling yard, and the machinery at the Royal William Victualling Yard, Plymouth. They also constructed some locomotives for the London and Croydon Railway. Many orders for foreign governments were executed, and the firm were employed by the Admiralty in making engines for the Royal Navy. He was much interested in the screw-propeller, and his firm built the engines for Archimedes, the world's first propeller-driven steamship. Subsequently, in 1840, the firm built for the Admiralty the Dwarf, the first vessel in the British navy propelled by a screw.

Roe (1916) discusses Rennie's contributions to the development of the planer.

In 1822 he was elected Fellow of the Royal Society, and contributed papers to the Transactions in 1829 on the friction of metals and other substances. He also presented papers to the British Association and to the Institution of Civil Engineers, of which body he was elected a member in 1841.

== Death ==
He died on 30 March 1866, at his house, 39 Wilton Crescent, from the effects of an accident in the street in the previous year, and was buried on 6 April at Holmwood, near Dorking. He married, in 1828, Margaret Anne, daughter of Sir John Jackson, 1st Baronet, M.P., who survived him; they had two sons and one daughter.

== Bibliography ==
- Roe, Joseph Wickham (1916), English and American Tool Builders, New Haven, Connecticut: Yale University Press, LCCN 16011753. Reprinted by McGraw-Hill, New York and London, 1926 (LCCN 27-24075); and by Lindsay Publications, Inc., Bradley, Illinois (ISBN 978-0-917914-73-7).
- This article incorporates text from a publication now in the public domain: Richard Bissell Prosser (1896). "Rennie, George (1791-1866)" . In Lee, Sidney (ed.). Dictionary of National Biography. Vol. 48. London: Smith, Elder & Co.
