= Fenton, Murray and Jackson =

Fenton, Murray and Wood
- Company type: General partnership
- Industry: Engineering; Heavy industry
- Founded: 1790s
- Founder: David Wood; Matthew Murray
- Defunct: 1843
- Fate: Out of business
- Successor: Fenton, Murray and Jackson
- Headquarters: Round Foundry, Holbeck, Leeds, United Kingdom
- Key people: James Fenton; William Lister; Joshua Routledge; Benjamin Hick; Benjamin Cubitt; Charles Todd; John Chester Craven; Richard Peacock; David Joy

Fenton, Murray and Jackson was an engineering company at the Round Foundry off Water Lane in Holbeck, Leeds, West Yorkshire, England.

== Fenton, Murray and Wood ==
Fenton Murray and Wood was founded in the 1790s by ironfounder Matthew Murray and textile machine engineer David Wood to build machine tools (mainly for the textile industry) and stationary steam engines. The company was capitalised by colliery owner James Fenton (1754–1834) as the main financier, and millwright William Lister, a sleeping partner.

The partnership was approached to design a locomotive that would exploit the rack-and-pinion patent granted to Blenkinsop in 1811. Their 1812 product, Salamanca was successful, and a total of six engines were built before Murray's death in 1826.

== Fenton, Murray and Jackson ==
After Wood's death in 1820, the company became Fenton, Murray and Jackson.

In 1824 the company supplied a 60hp beam engine to the commissioners of Deeping Fen as one of two erected at Pode Hole. The other engine was supplied by the Butterley Company as were the scoop wheels for both. Although the Butterley engine was purchased outright (for £3,300), it appears that the Fenton and Murray engine was not. The accounts for 1825 showed a payment of only £127/6/- for the Fenton engine. It was not uncommon for beam engines to be leased, purchased 'on terms', or paid for in other novel ways such as a share of the earnings. The engine was named Kesteven and worked until 1925.

From 1831, work began building engines to Robert Stephenson's designs, both 2-2-0 "Planets" and 2-2-2 "Patentees", many of them under subcontract. Many were exported, and twenty of Daniel Gooch's Firefly class for the Great Western Railway. By 1840, they were turning out up to twenty engines a year.

The company's name appears on cast iron bollards still in situ at Victoria Lock (built 1843) on the River Shannon in Ireland as Fenton, Murray and Jackson Engineers of Leeds.

However, by 1843, the boom was over and the company closed down.
