= John Gray (locomotive engineer) =

English steam locomotive engineer

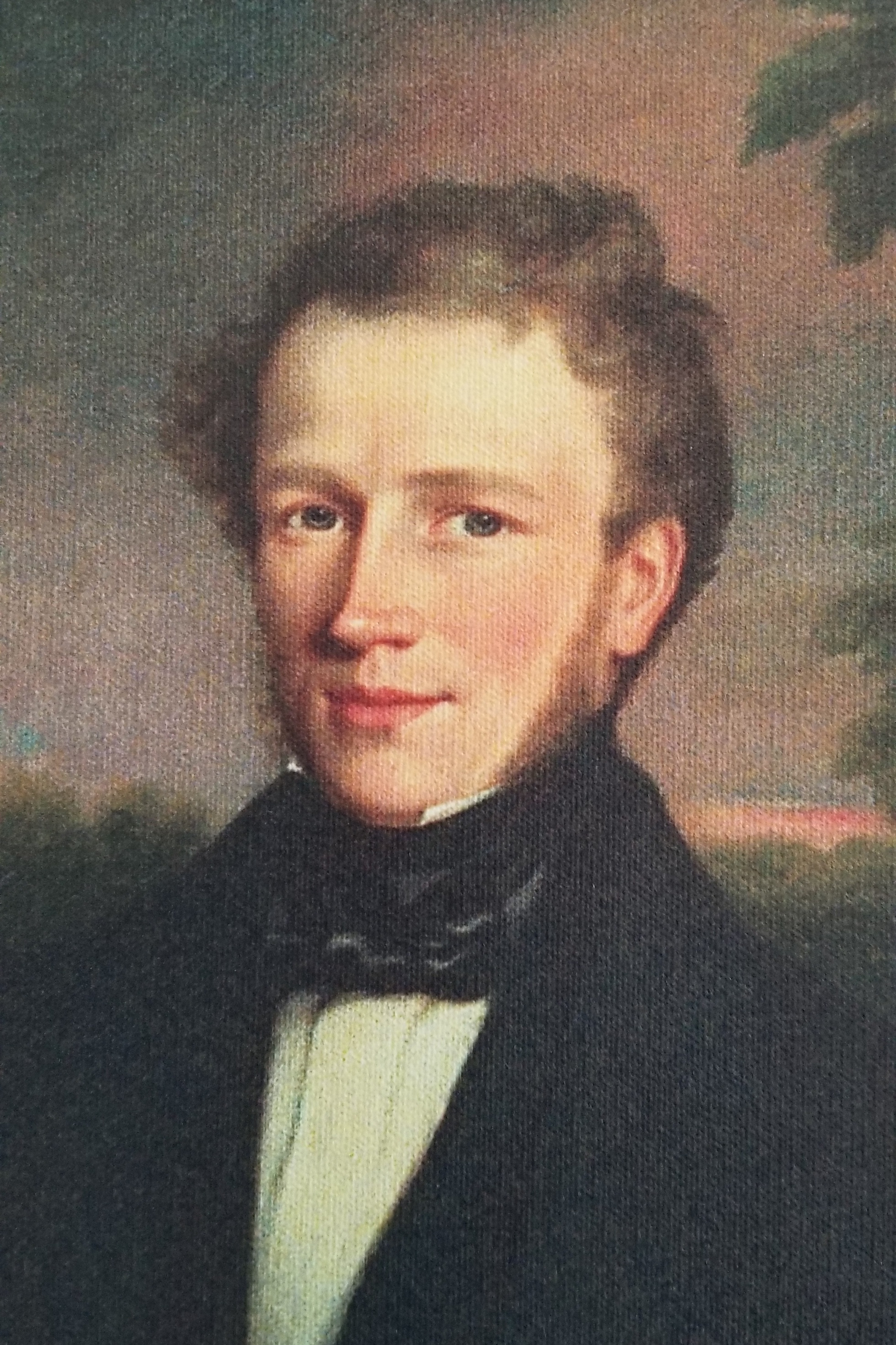
From a portrait of John Gray and his wife Sarah.

John Gray was an early English steam locomotive engineer who introduced several innovations in locomotive design during the 1830s and 1840s. John Gray's origins were thought to be unknown but he appears to have originated from Newcastle. John Gray was born 29 August 1810 in Newcastle upon Tyne, Northumberland, England.

== Career ==
=== Innovations ===
In 1838 he was working for the Liverpool and Manchester Railway where he was the first engineer to use the balanced slide valve on locomotives, and later applied a form of expansion gear. In 1840 he was appointed locomotive superintendent of the Hull and Selby Railway where he became the first locomotive engineer to use long-travel valve motion.

=== Locomotive superintendent ===
In 1845 he was appointed locomotive superintendent of the Croydon Dover and Brighton Joint Committee, which then operated the pooled locomotive fleets of the London and Croydon Railway, the South Eastern Railway and the London and Brighton Railway. On the dissolution of this committee and the formation of the London Brighton and South Coast Railway in 1846 Gray was appointed Locomotive Superintendent at Brighton works. However, in 1847 he was dismissed from this post as a result of problems over the late delivery of locomotives from Timothy Hackworth.

Business positions
Preceded by —	Locomotive Superintendent of the Hull and Selby Railway; 1840–1845	Succeeded by Company leased to the York and North Midland Railway
Preceded by —	Locomotive Superintendent of the Croydon, Dover and Brighton Joint Committee; 1845–1846	Joint Committee dissolved
Preceded by —	Locomotive Superintendent of the London, Brighton and South Coast Railway; 1846–1847	Succeeded by Thomas Kirtley
