= Mechanics Monument =

Sculpture by Douglas Tilden in San Francisco, California, U.S.

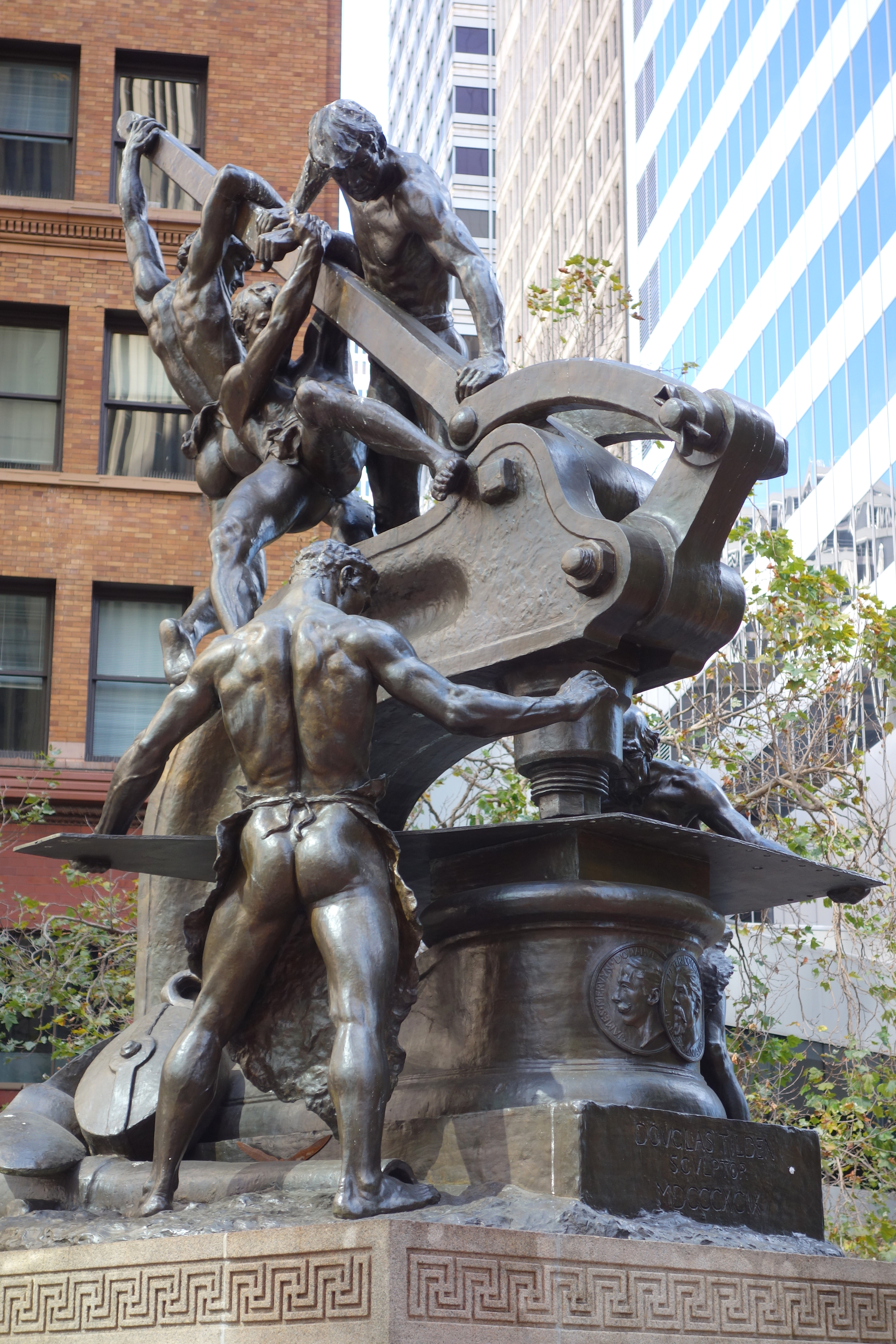
- The monument in 2014
- Interactive map of Mechanics Monument
- Location: Market, Bush, and Battery Streets in San Francisco, California, United States
- Coordinates: 37°47′28″N 122°23′57″W
- Designer: Douglas Tilden
- Type: Sculpture
- Material: Bronze; granite
- Height: 21 feet (6.4 m)
- Completion date: 30 March 1901

The Mechanics Monument, also known as The Mechanics, Mechanics Statue, or Mechanics Fountain since it originally featured as the centerpiece of a pool of water at the base during the first five years, is a bronze sculpture group by Douglas Tilden, located at the intersection of Market, Bush and Battery Streets in San Francisco, California, United States.

== History ==
Tilden was commissioned to create three major art works for a Market Street beautification project at the turn of the 20th century: the Admission Day Monument (Market and Montgomery Streets), California Volunteers (Market and Dolores Streets, but originally standing at Market and Van Ness Avenue), and this monument and fountain. It was originally to be called the Donahue Memorial Fountain for the bequest of $25,000 from businessman James Mervyn Donahue, the son of the late Peter Donahue, who had built his business, The Union Iron Works, into what would be the first foundry on the Pacific Coast of the United States. The will's executors argued for the Donahue name, saying "There are none of the Donahues left to keep alive the name. Mervyn saw how it would be after his death, and it was his idea that out of the wreck of the Donahue name this monument should last and keep alive the name." The fountain was intended to be "beautiful in design and excellent in workmanship ... an ornament to San Francisco and a monument to the memory of Mervyn's father, Peter Donahue."

I direct my executors, hereinafter named, to cause to be erected at the intersection of Market, Bush and Battery streets, in San Francisco, opposite First street, for the City, a public fountain dedicated to mechanics in memory of my father, at a cost of the sum of $25,000.

— J. Mervyn Donahue, Will of J. Mervyn Donahue

Mervyn Donahue's widow sued to block the bequest in June 1896, arguing the bequest was "a charity" and objecting to the amount earmarked for a fountain, while the executors of the will successfully argued the heirs had already been paid sums far larger than the fountain bequest. An earlier suit was decided in favor of the executors, who had already announced an imminent public competition for the fountain's design. Donahue's widow's case was decided for the executors of the will in August 1896, clearing the way for the competition to begin. Peter McGlynn, one of the executors, stated "the design should come from an artist of California, and that the materials and workmanship should be Californian."

Tilden was commissioned almost immediately on the basis of his prior work for Phelan, the Admission Day Monument. For Tilden, this monument would be his most ambitious. His model was accepted in 1899.

The Donahue Fountain was dedicated on May 15, 1901. Initial plans called for President McKinley to attend the dedication, but Mayor Phelan caused a stir amongst the large crowd gathered for the dedication by announcing McKinley's trip to San Francisco had been cut short by Mrs. McKinley's illness, and the President was unable to attend. Phelan made a brief speech accepting the statue, which was then unveiled by Irving M. Scott, manager of the Union Iron Works.

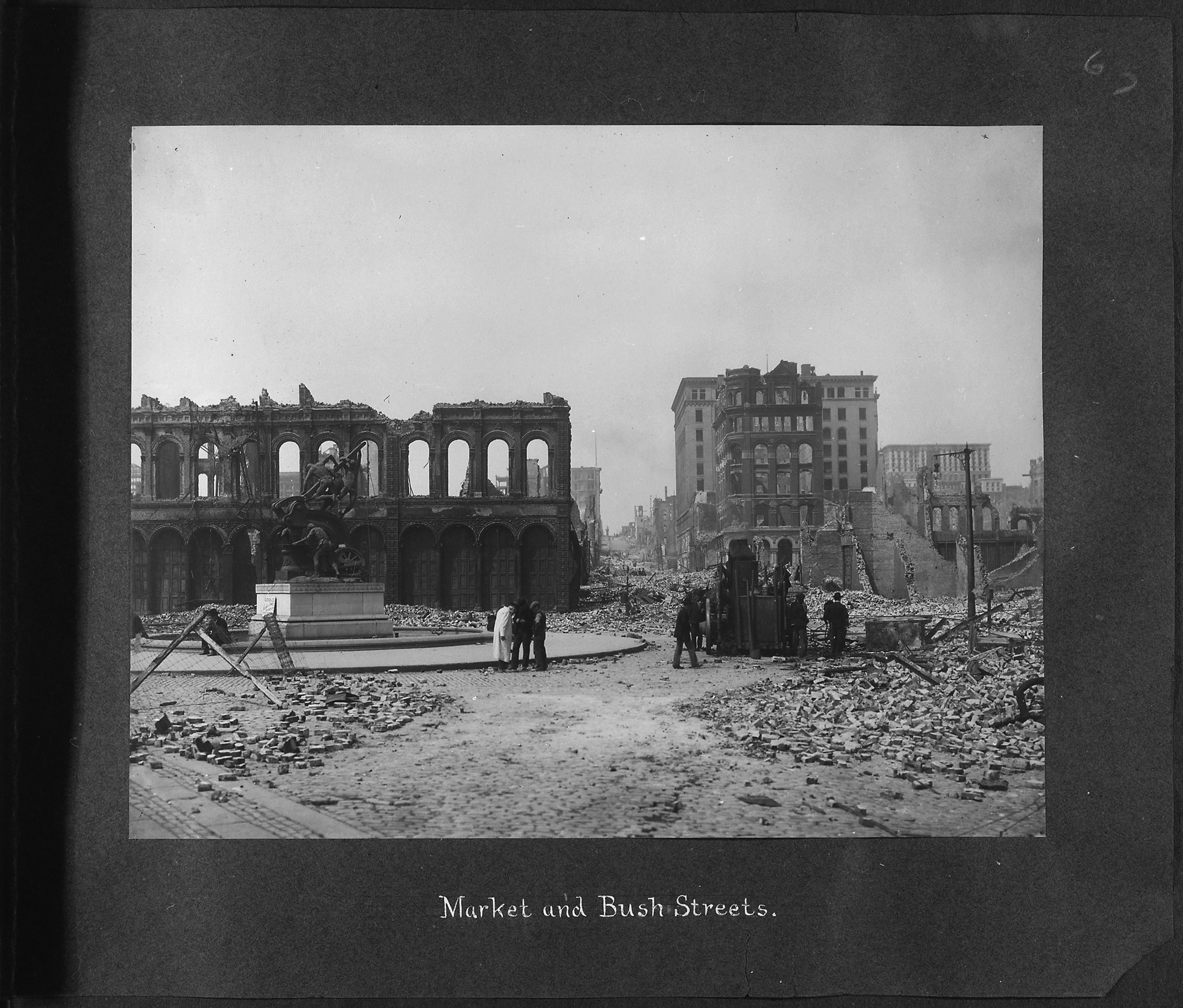
The monument following the 1906 San Francisco earthquake

President Theodore Roosevelt later visited the fountain on May 13, 1903, and spoke to a large crowd using the monument as a backdrop. His speech was entitled "Expansion and Trade Development and Protection of the Countries Newly Acquired Possessions." When originally erected in 1901, it was the center of a fountain, but following the 1906 San Francisco earthquake, the basin was eliminated.

== Design ==
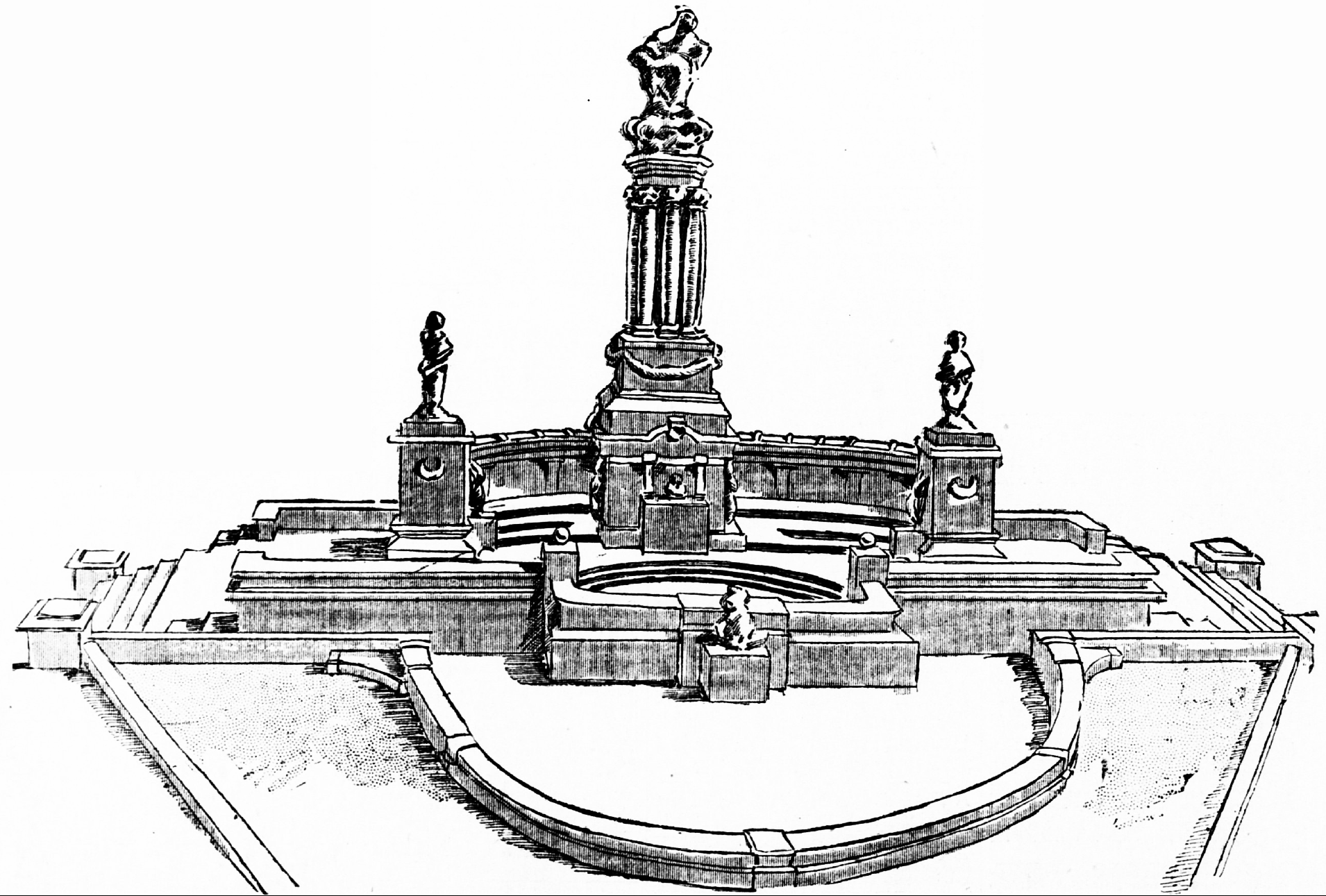
1897 sketch of Tilden's initial design

A clay model was presented to the executors of Donahue's estate in January 1900, with initial plans calling for the monument to be a drinking fountain 40 feet (12 m) high surrounded by a basin 40 feet (12 m) in diameter, featuring 8-foot (2.4 m)-high figures.

As originally completed, the bronze and granite monument was the centerpiece of a water basin. Five separate nude figures are operating a punching machine, which is acting on a piece of boiler plate. The monument was 21 feet (6.4 m) high and the basin was 40 feet (12 m) in circumference. The bronze figures were placed on the granite base in March 1901. The underlying concept is "the five ages of man." Carlo Moni and Nonette McGlashan were credited with assisting Tilden on Mechanics Monument. The sculpture was derisively dubbed "Donahue's pump" soon after unveiling.

== See also ==
- 1901 in art
