= Peter Donahue (businessman) =

American railroad executive and businessman

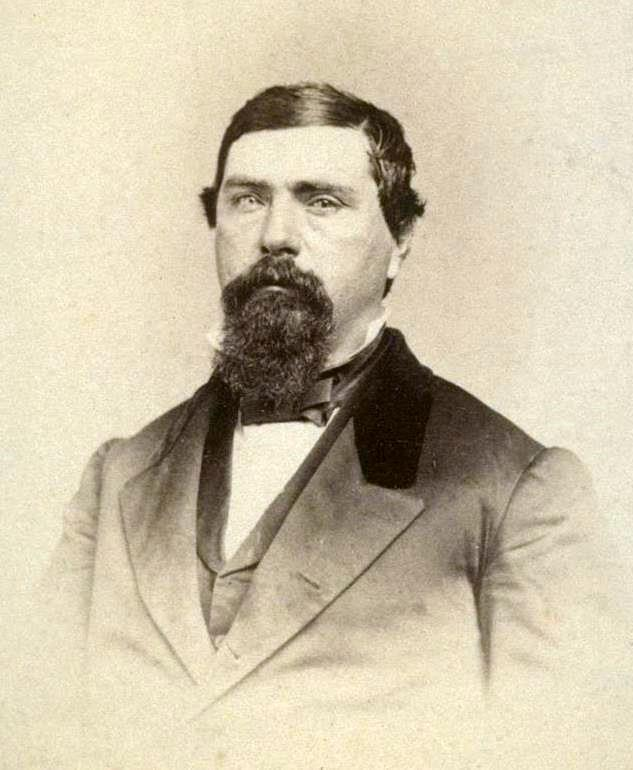
- Born: 1822 January 11; Glasgow, Scotland
- Died: 1885 November 26; San Francisco, California
- Occupation: Businessman
- Known for: Co-founder of the Union Iron Works; founder of the San Francisco Gas Company, founder of the San Francisco and North Pacific Railroad; co-founder of the San Francisco and San Jose Railroad; built first railroad to go to Santa Rosa, California

Peter Donahue (January 11, 1822 - November 26, 1885), was an Irish American businessman and Industrial pioneer. He and his brothers James and Michael are considered the founders of industrial San Francisco. Born in Glasgow, Scotland of Northern Irish parents, his family moved to Paterson, New Jersey when he and his brothers were young. It was there that they learned the trade of machinists.

In December 1847, Donahue helped deliver a gunboat, the Rimac (which he had helped construct at the Brown and Bell foundry) to the Peruvian government, arriving in Callao in July 1848. It was during his time in Peru that he heard of gold being discovered in California, and booked passage on the Pacific Mail steamship Oregon, bound for San Francisco.

In 1849, after several unproductive months in the gold fields, and after hearing rumors that his younger brother James was in California, Peter returned to San Francisco, where he found his brother James running a modest blacksmith's shop at First and Mission Streets. Together with their brother Michael (who arrived some months later), they gradually expanded their forge into a foundry (which became known as the Union Iron Works).

In 1852, with supplies and financial backing from his contacts in Paterson, New Jersey, and with the approval of city authorities, Donahue founded the San Francisco Gas Company, a forerunner of Pacific Gas and Electric Company.

In 1860 Donahue founded the Omnibus Railroad, the first crosstown streetcar service in San Francisco. Using horse-drawn cars, he ran a line from Third Street and Townsend to Union and Powell, as well as one running from Montgomery and Washington to Howard and Mission Dolores. The Omnibus Railroad was later purchased by the Market Street Railway Company, which would much later be purchased by the Municipal Railway (Muni).

In 1860, Donahue also organized the San Francisco and San Jose Railroad (which continues in operation today as the publicly administered commuter service Caltrain, while Union Pacific Railroad continues to provide freight service over this same route).

In 1869, after failed efforts by Asbury Harpending to organize a northern line, Donahue acquired the rights to the San Francisco and North Pacific Railroad and constructed a line that went North from a landing on Petaluma Creek, that became known as Donahue, to Cazadero. He later decided to place the railhead farther south at Point Tiburon, building the railroad ferries that connected San Francisco to the Northern Counties. Donahue thus built the first railroad to serve Santa Rosa, California.

Donahue's Union Iron Works constructed many of the graceful double-ended railroad ferries that plied the waters of the San Francisco Bay well into the 20th century. (The Eureka, built in his Tiburon yard five years after his death, can still be seen today at San Francisco Maritime National Historical Park on the Hyde Street Pier).

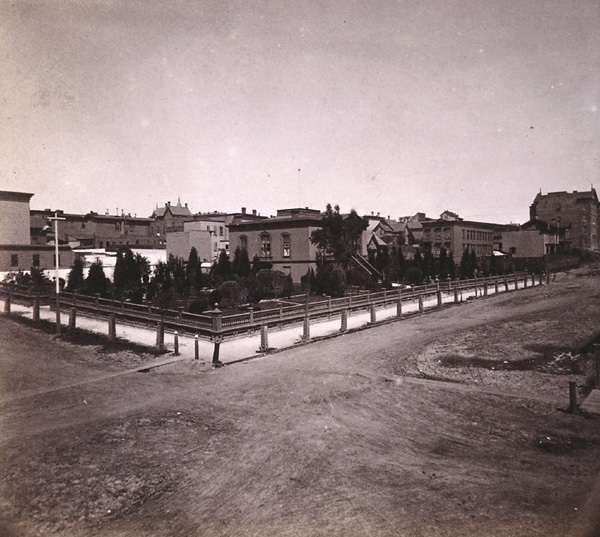
Peter Donahue's house, Bryant and Second Streets, San Francisco 1870

Peter Donahue died on Thanksgiving Day, November 26, 1885, a few days after catching a cold while surveying his Tiburon rail yard.

The Mechanics Monument in San Francisco, unveiled in 1901, was a tribute to the Donahue brothers' contributions, commissioned by Peter's son James Mervyn Donahue, and designed by Douglas Tilden.
