= Francis Marion Wells =

American sculptor

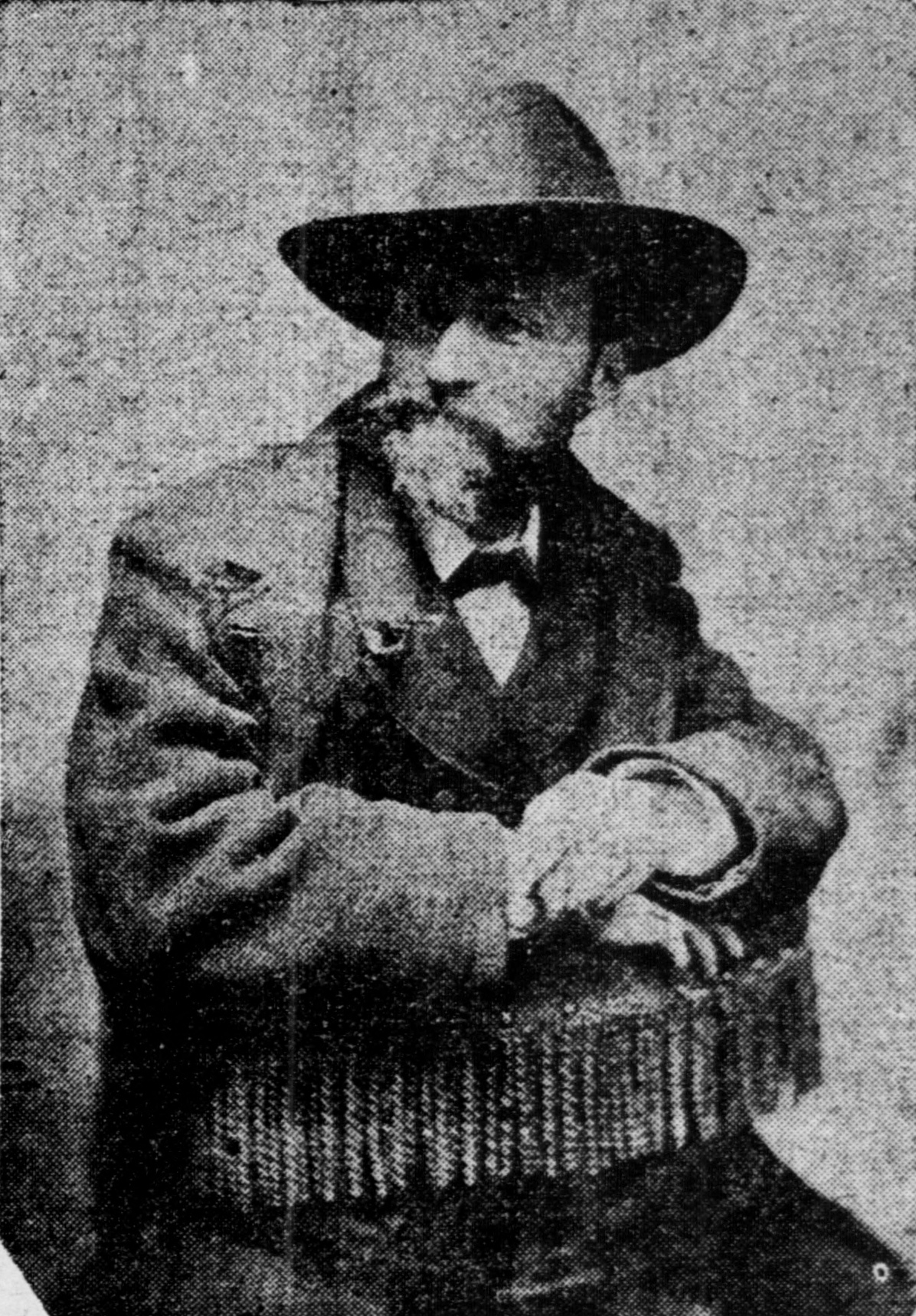
F. Marion Wells, American sculptor

Francis Marion Wells (1848 - July 22, 1903) was a sculptor active in the San Francisco, California area as a teacher and creator of portrait busts and bas-reliefs, now best remembered for his former Goddess of Progress atop the dome of San Francisco City Hall.

Wells was born in Louisiana and educated in eastern Pennsylvania. He arrived in San Francisco about 1870, where in 1872 he became a charter member of the Bohemian Club. In 1883 he was Douglas Tilden's first teacher, and in 1884 was commissioned for a bust of King Kalākaua of Hawaii, who was visiting Oakland. Although once wealthy, his loan to President Carlos Ezeta of El Salvador went unpaid and left him penniless. He was buried at public expense.

== Selected works ==
- Goddess of Progress, San Francisco's City Hall
- James Lick relief, Mechanics' Institute
- James Lick relief, Pioneer Hall
- James W. Marshall monument, Sonora County
- Bears, over the entrance to the First National Bank
- Great owl, atop the grand stairway of the Bohemian Club
- Unidentified work at St. Ignatius Church
- Unidentified work at the quadrangle and memorial chapel, Stanford University
