= California Volunteers (sculpture) =

Monument by Douglas Tilden in San Francisco, California, U.S.

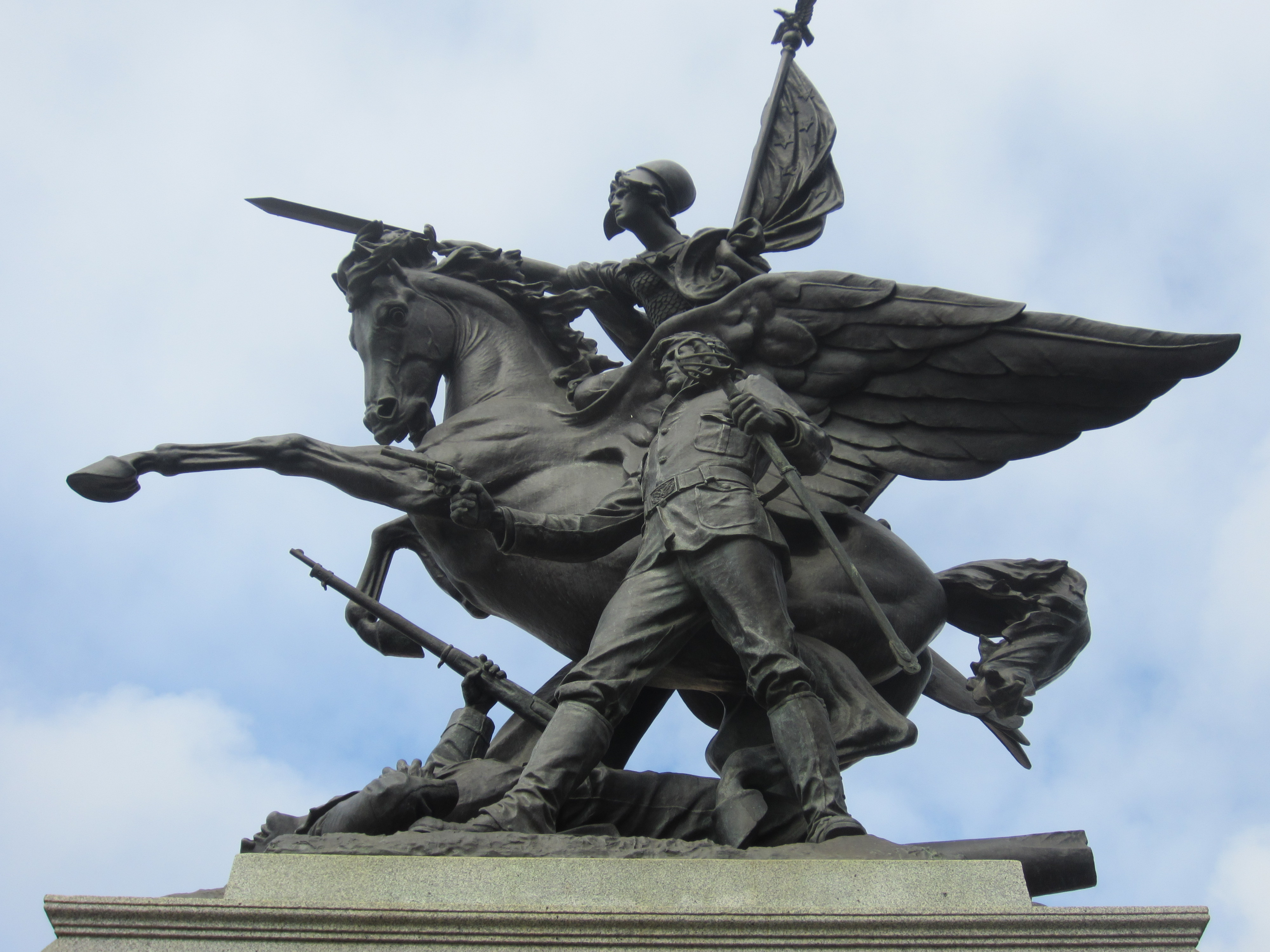
- The monument in 2013
- Interactive map of California Volunteers
- Location: Market and Dolores in San Francisco, California, United States
- Coordinates: 37°46′08″N 122°25′37″W
- Designer: Douglas Tilden
- Type: sculpture
- Material: Bronze; granite
- Height: 26 feet (7.9 m) from ground level
- Completion date: August 12, 1906
- Dedicated to: Spanish–American War veterans from California

California Volunteers, also known as the California Volunteers' Memorial and the Spanish–American War Memorial, is an outdoor sculpture installed in 1906 by Douglas Tilden.

== History ==
California Volunteers was originally installed at the intersection of Market and Van Ness per the request of the sponsoring committee of citizens and the sculptor.

This committee and the sculptor, Douglas Tilden, are unanimous in favor of locating this, the most important of our public monuments, at the junction of Van Ness avenue and Market street. There is a fine open space there. Public parades usually pass by the very spot and the armory of the First California Regiment is but a few blocks distant.

— James D. Phelan, W.J. Martin, and M. H. de Young, Committee of Citizens letter to the Board of Park Commissioners, December 12, 1905

The monument cost $25,000. Funding for the monument came from surplus donations for a reception held for the volunteers from California upon their return from the Philippines.

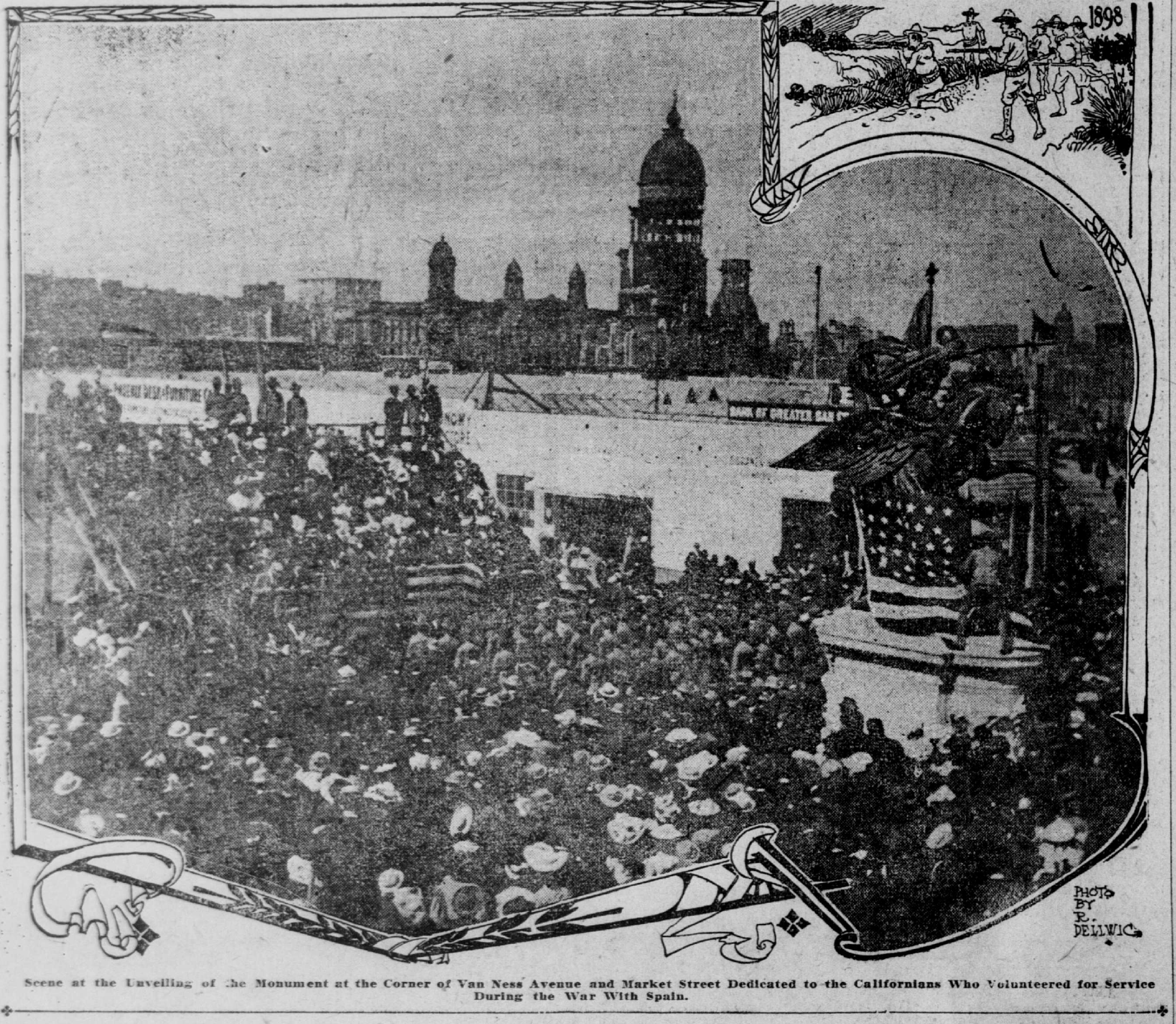
Scene from the dedication ceremony on August 12, 1906

The monument was dedicated on Sunday, August 12, 1906. During the ceremony, several dignitaries gave speeches, including former San Francisco Mayor Phelan; current Mayor Schmitz; California Governor Pardee; and General James F. Smith, Governor-General of the Philippines.

In 1925, it was moved to its present location at the corner of Market and Dolores Street.

== Design ==
The central figure depicts Bellona, goddess of war, riding on the back of Pegasus, the winged horse. (The 1906 San Francisco Call article reporting from the dedication ceremony describes the riding figure as Victory). There are two soldiers on the monument, one fallen, and one standing to the side armed with a pistol. One side of the pedestal is inscribed with the text "Erected by the Citizens of San Francisco in Honor of the California Volunteers, Spanish–American War, 1898. First to the Front." The bronze figures are 16 feet (4.9 m) tall and 10 feet (3.0 m) long, mounted on a granite base another 10 feet (3.0 m) tall.

Shortly after its dedication in August 1906, Will Sparks criticized the original placement of the monument at Market and Van Ness, stating "from many points of view, including one of the most important, the [silhouette] is absolutely meaningless. Looking down Van Ness avenue it is impossible to tell what it is that surmounts the pedestal. There is nothing but a tangled mess of bronze." Sparks went on to recommend the monument should be relocated "up beside a building where only the one impressive side would show. Do this with it and it will become a great monument. As it is there is much that is disappointing." His criticism was, however, not heard.

== See also ==
- 1906 in art
