= San Francisco and North Pacific Railroad =

Railroad in northern California (1869–1907)

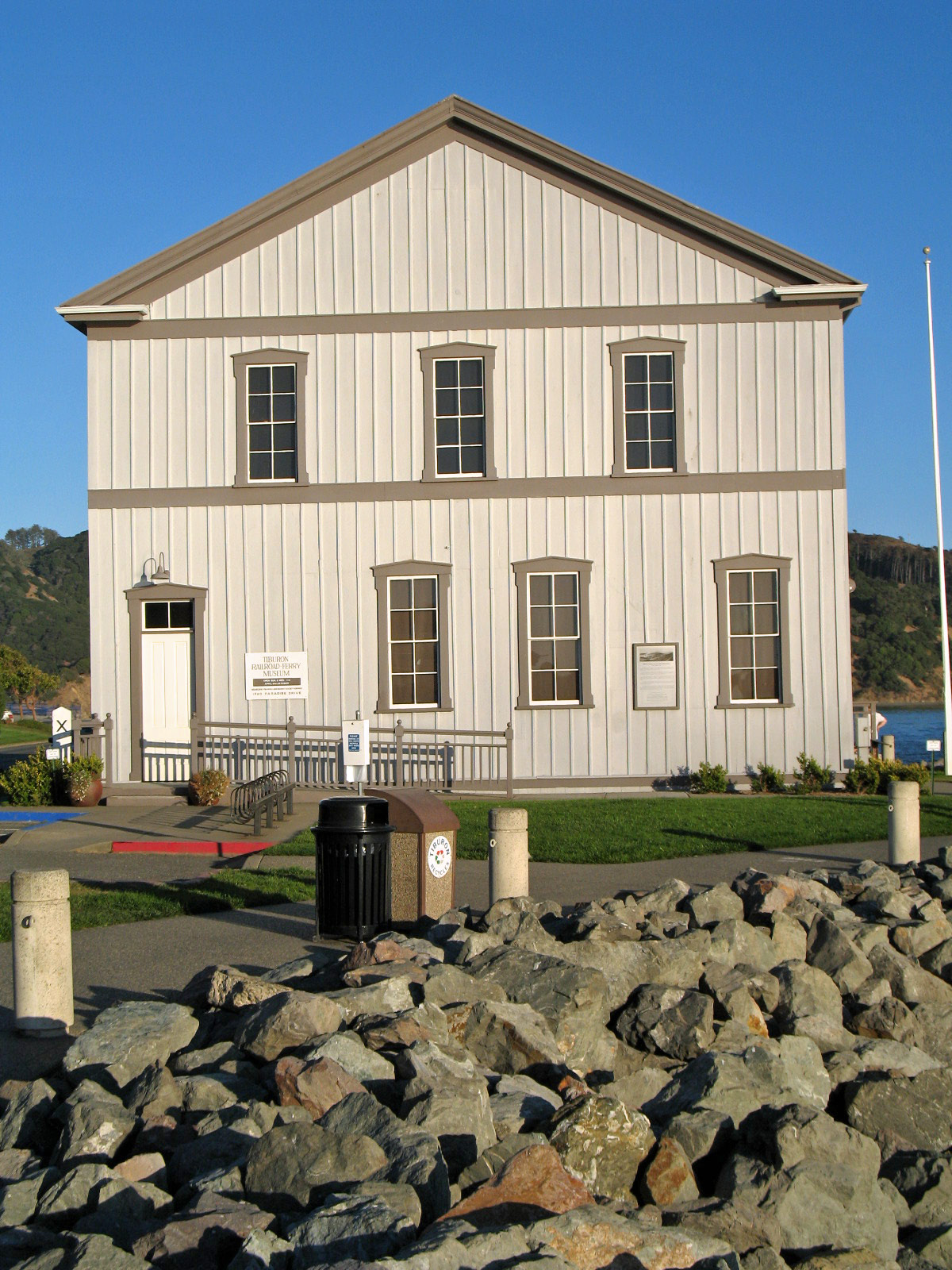
- San Francisco and North Pacific Railroad Station House-Depot, Tiburon, California (on the National Register of Historic Places as the Peter Donahue Building)

Overview
- Locale: Northern California, USA
- Dates of operation: 1869–1907
- Successor: Northwestern Pacific Railroad

Technical
- Track gauge: 4 ft 8 1/2 in (1,435 mm) standard gauge

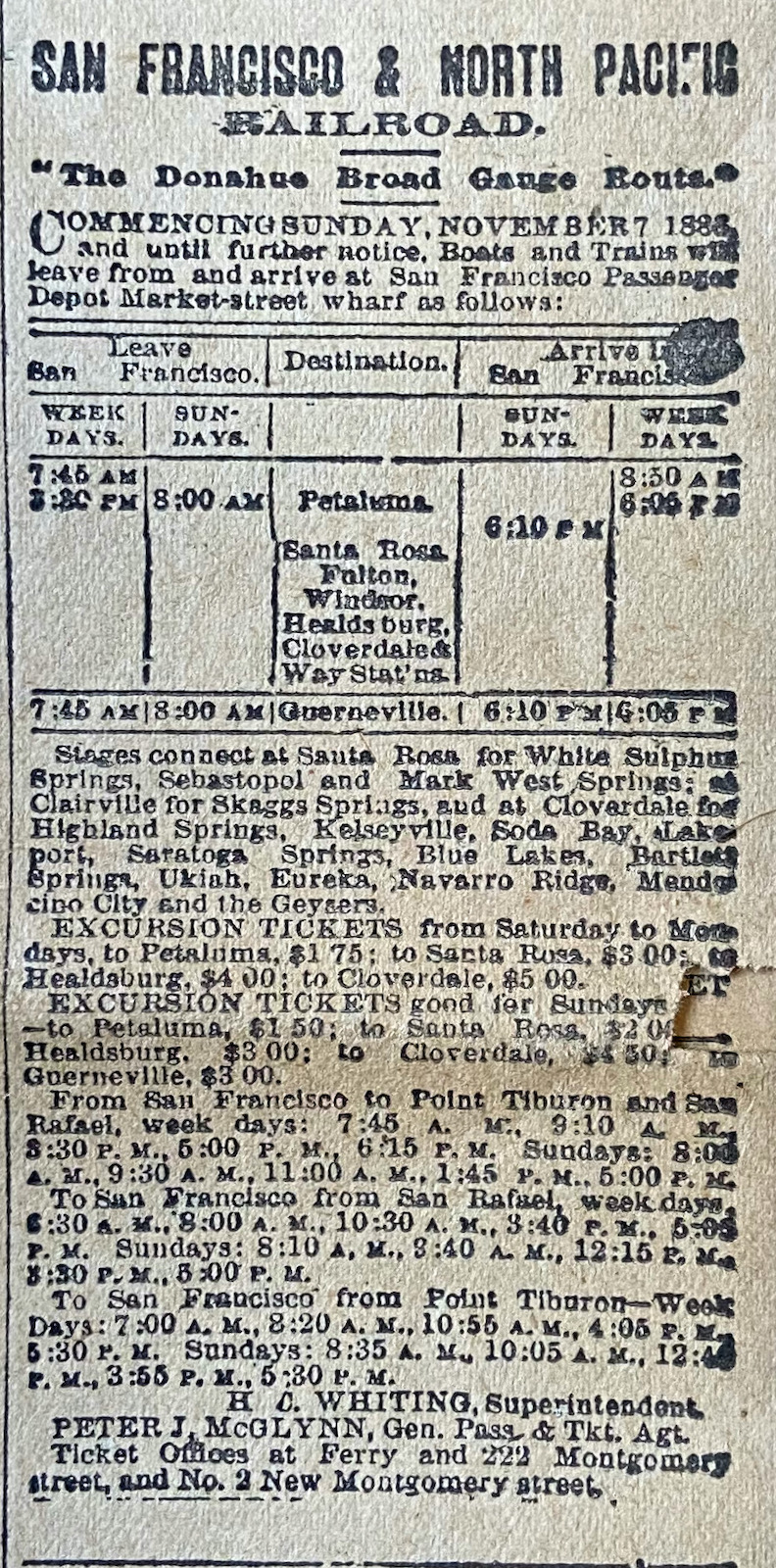
Schedule and rates in 1887

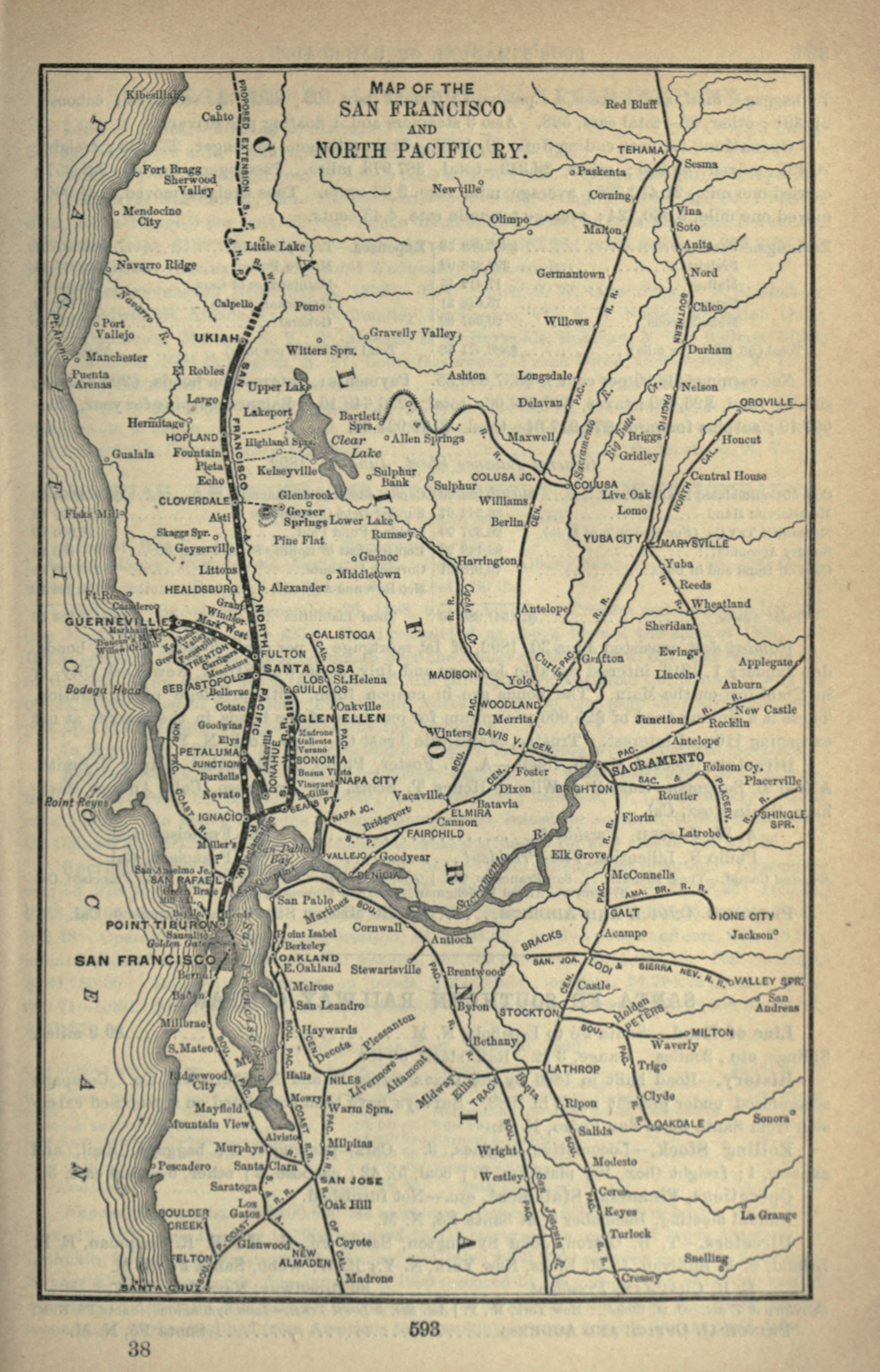
San Francisco and North Pacific Railway, 1893

San Francisco and North Pacific Railroad (SF&NP) provided the first extensive standard gauge rail service to Sonoma County and became the southern end of the regional Northwestern Pacific Railroad. Although first conceived of by Asbury Harpending, who had even obtained many of the right of ways, the SF&NP was bought and subsequently constructed by Peter Donahue, who drove the first spike on August 30, 1869.

Sonoma County's first standard-gauge railroad, operated by the Sonoma County Railroad Company, was the 1-mile (1.6 km) Petaluma and Haystack Railroad connecting the city of Petaluma with ferry service to San Francisco from Haystack Landing on the Petaluma River in 1864. Petaluma and Haystack coaches were pulled by horses after the locomotive exploded on 27 August 1866.

SF&NP began construction from Petaluma northward in 1869, but inability to make satisfactory arrangements with the City of Petaluma caused the railroad to establish a new southern ferry terminus on the Petaluma River at Donahue Landing. Service was extended north to Santa Rosa in 1870, and Cloverdale in 1872. The Fulton and Guerneville Railroad was formed in 1874 to build a SF&NP branch from Fulton to Guerneville on the Russian River. The branch was completed in 1877. A Sonoma County atlas from 1877 claims that along the entire 60 miles (97 km) of the railroad line, there was no cut deeper than 10 feet (3.0 m).

In 1879, the SF&NP was extended south through Petaluma to San Rafael in Marin County. The San Francisco and San Rafael Railroad was formed in 1882 to extend the SF&NP south another 9 miles (14 km) to a new ferry landing in Tiburon. SF&NP ferry terminal facilities were moved to Tiburon in 1884; and Donahue Landing faded into the rural countryside.

The Cloverdale and Ukiah Railroad was formed in 1886 to extend the SF&NP north to Ukiah in Mendocino County. Service began to Ukiah in 1889. The Santa Rosa, Sebastopol and Green Valley Railroad was formed in 1889 to build a SF&NP branch from Santa Rosa to Sebastopol. The branch was completed in 1890.

The California Northwestern Railway Company was formed in 1898 as part of Southern Pacific Railroad ambitions to reach the redwood lumber mills around Humboldt Bay. SF&NP struggled through the panic of 1893, and was leased by the California Northwestern in 1898. California Northwestern oversaw eastward connections to the Southern Pacific Railroad and northward extension to Willits before merger into the Northwestern Pacific Railroad in 1907.

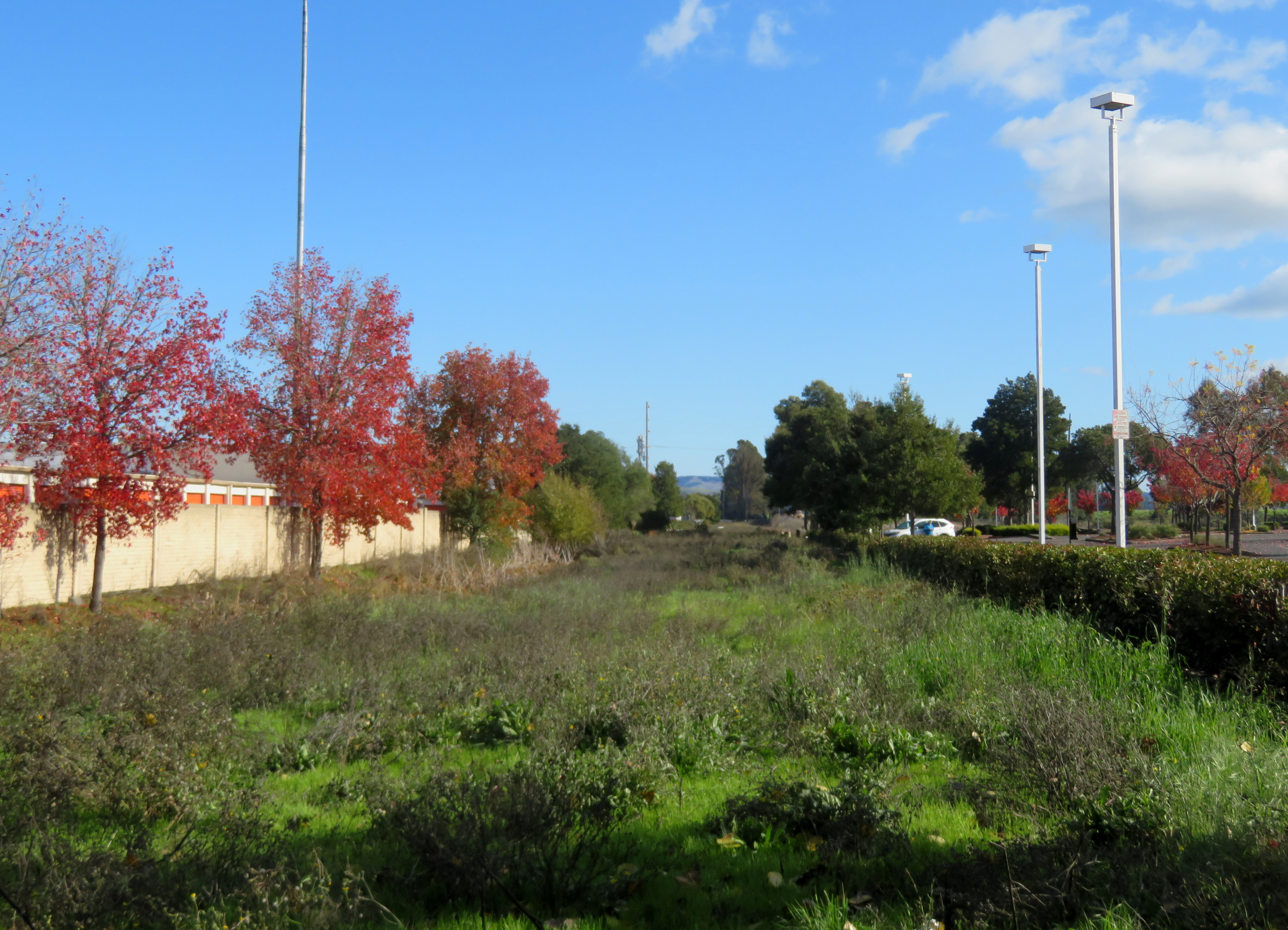
An abandoned section of the original SF&NP right-of-way from Petaluma to Donahue Landing as seen in 2019

== Locomotives ==
Number	Name	Builder	Type	Date	Works number	Notes
1	Little Josie	Norris Locomotive Works	4-4-0	1862	1009	ex-San Francisco and San Jose Railroad #2 San Jose became Northwestern Pacific Railroad #4
2	J.G.Downey	Booth	4-4-0	1870	14	became Northwestern Pacific Railroad #6
3	W.J.Ralston	Booth	4-4-0	1870	15	became Northwestern Pacific Railroad #7
4	Geyser	Booth	4-4-0	1873	16	scrapped 1904
5	Santa Rosa	Booth	4-4-0	1873	17	became Northwestern Pacific Railroad #5
6	Cloverdale	Grant Locomotive Works	4-4-0	1878		became Northwestern Pacific Railroad #11
7	Petaluma	Grant Locomotive Works	4-4-0	1878		became Northwestern Pacific Railroad #12
8	San Rafael	Baldwin Locomotive Works	4-4-0	1881	5485	became Northwestern Pacific Railroad #8
9	Marin	Grant Locomotive Works	4-4-0	1883	1664	became Northwestern Pacific Railroad #9
10	Healdsburg	Grant Locomotive Works	4-4-0	1883	1665	became Northwestern Pacific Railroad #10
11	Ukiah	Booth	4-4-0	1874	30	scrapped 1907
12	Peter Donahue	Rogers Locomotive Works	4-4-0	1884	3305	became Northwestern Pacific Railroad #19
13	Tom Rogers	Rogers Locomotive Works	4-4-0	1884	3306	became Northwestern Pacific Railroad #20
14	Tiburon	Grant Locomotive Works	4-4-0	1888		became Northwestern Pacific Railroad #14
15	Eureka	Grant Locomotive Works	4-6-0	1888		became Northwestern Pacific Railroad #102
16	Vichy	Rogers Locomotive Works	4-4-0	1889	4154	became Northwestern Pacific Railroad #18
17	Lytton	Rogers Locomotive Works	4-4-0	1889	4155	became Northwestern Pacific Railroad #17
18	Skaggs	Rogers Locomotive Works	4-6-0	1889	4212	became Northwestern Pacific Railroad #101
19		Baldwin Locomotive Works	4-6-0	1900	17759	became Northwestern Pacific Railroad #110
20		Richmond Locomotive Works	4-6-0	1901	3304	became Northwestern Pacific Railroad #103
21		American Locomotive Company	4-6-0	1902	25620	became Northwestern Pacific Railroad #105
22		Baldwin Locomotive Works	4-6-0	1904	23933	became Northwestern Pacific Railroad #107
23		Baldwin Locomotive Works	4-6-0	1904	23951	became Northwestern Pacific Railroad #108
24		Baldwin Locomotive Works	4-4-0	1904	24035	became Northwestern Pacific Railroad #21
25		American Locomotive Company	4-6-0	1902	25621	became Northwestern Pacific Railroad #106

== Sources ==
=== Bibliography ===
- Dillon, Richard H. (1984). Iron Men: California's Industrial Pioneers: Peter, James and Michael Donahue. Candela Press.
- Kneiss, Gilbert H. (1956). Redwood Railways. Berkeley, California: Howell-North.
- Stindt, Fred A. (1978). The Northwestern Pacific Railroad Redwood Empire Route (Third ed.). Redwood City, California: Fred A. Stindt. ISBN 978-1112651649.
- Stindt, Fred A. (1974). Trains to the Russian River. Railway & Locomotive Historical Society.
- Stindt, Fred A. (1985). The Northwestern Pacific Railroad Volume Two. Kelseyville, California: Fred A. Stindt. ISBN 0-9615465-0-6.
- Draper, Prudence and Lloyd (2004). Images of America: Cotati. Arcadia Publishing. ISBN 0-7385-2873-0.
