= Douglas Tilden =

American sculptor

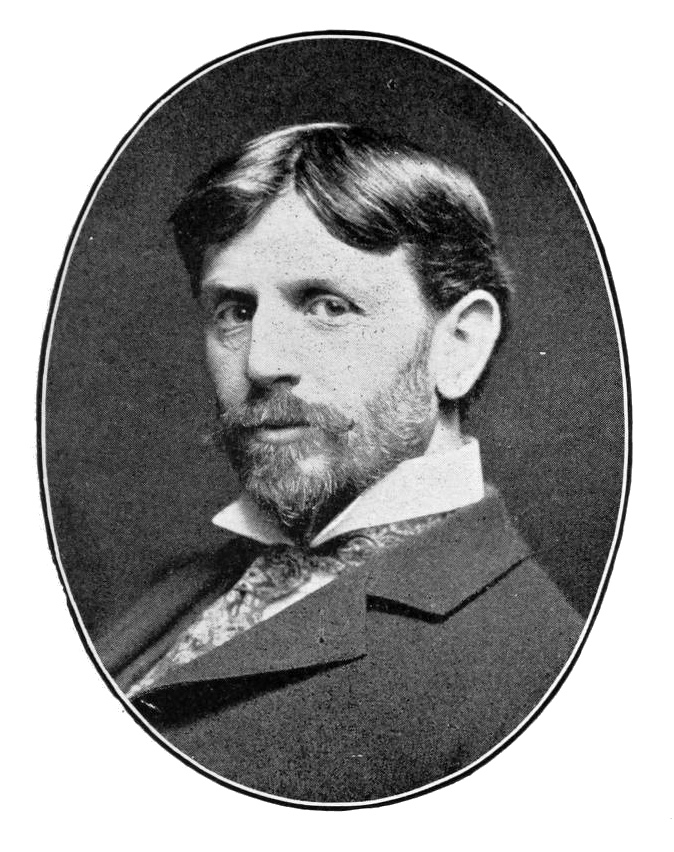
- Born: May 1, 1860; Chico, California
- Died: August 5, 1935 (aged 75); Berkeley, California
- Resting place: Mountain View
- Notable work: Admission Day (1897); Mechanics Monument (1901); California Volunteers (sculpture) (1906)
- Spouse: Elizabeth "Bessie" Cole (m. 1896; div. 1926)

Douglas Tilden (May 1, 1860 – August 5, 1935) was an American sculptor. He was deaf from a bout of scarlet fever at the age of four and attended the California School for the Deaf in Berkeley, California. He sculpted many statues that are located today throughout San Francisco, Berkeley, and the San Francisco Bay Area.

== Early life ==
Douglas Tilden was born on May 1, 1860, to Dr. William Peregrine Tilden and Catherine Maria Hecox Tilden in Chico, California. When he was four, he lost his hearing and speech after a severe bout of scarlet fever. His grandfather, Adna Hecox, and mother Catherine were part of the ill-fated Donner Party, but they separated from the Donners before they became snowbound.

On going home for a vacation I was shown a plaster copy of one of the Flamingo boys. It had been modeled by my twelve year old brother. My first sensation was that of surprise and admiration. The art of creating with clay a harmonious and beautiful something was a mystery to me, and it was explained for my benefit. I looked long at the chubby face which hung on the wall, and I asked myself 'Could I do the same?'

— Douglas Tilden, on the genesis of his interest in sculpture, aged 23

Tilden entered the California School for the Deaf (then located in San Francisco) on January 25, 1866, studying under Theophilus d'Estrella. He moved with the School to a location near the University of California, Berkeley campus at what is now the Clark Kerr Campus student residence in 1869 and graduated in 1879. After graduating, he went on to attend and teach at UC Berkeley, where he studied with Francis Marion Wells. Tilden picked up sculpting in 1883, producing a small statuette entitled Tired Wrestler in 1885 which drew the attention of the board of the California School for the Deaf. The board subsequently offered him an opportunity to pursue sculpting and in 1887, he left Berkeley to attend the Academy of Design in New York, and from there, left to study art in Paris. After arriving in Paris in 1888, Tilden studied under Paul-François Choppin, another deaf sculptor.

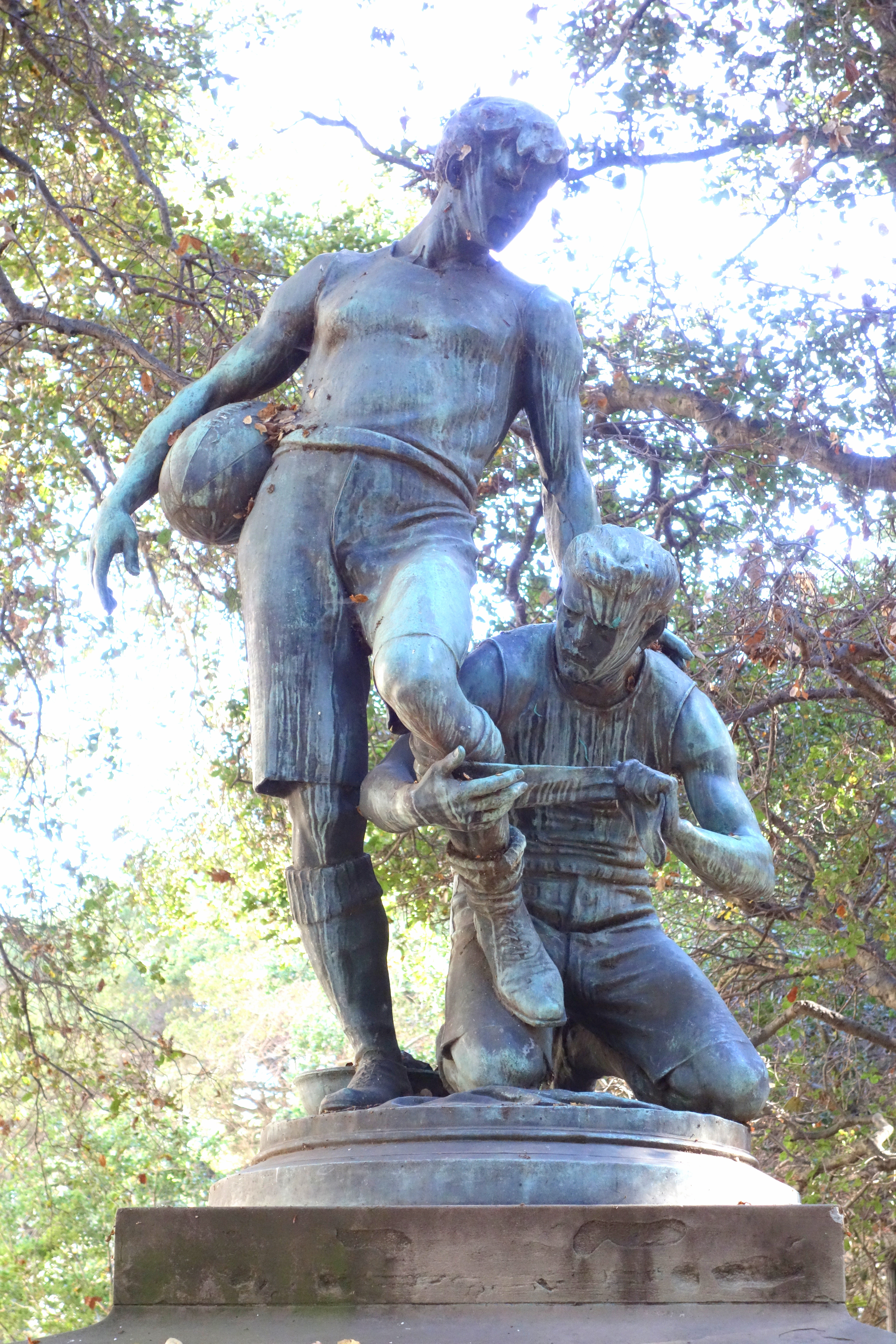
The Football Players (1900) in 2013

After several successful years in Paris, during which he produced Ball Player (a.k.a. Our National Game), The Tired Boxer, Young Acrobat, Indian Bear Hunt, and Football Players, Tilden returned to the California School for the Deaf in 1893; however, after getting married in 1896, Tilden left the School to pursue sculpting full-time under reportedly acrimonious terms. Because his stint in Paris had been paid by the School, they felt he should continue to serve as a teacher, while Tilden felt his schooling had been a gift. In return, the California School for the Deaf confiscated one of Tilden's early artworks, The Bear Hunt, as payment. Bear Hunt had been exhibited at the 1893 Columbian Exposition in Chicago, and the California School for the Deaf paid US$179 (equivalent to $6,414 in 2025) for its transport to San Francisco afterwards and tried to collect the cost from Tilden, who responded by proposing to melt the sculpture down for its copper to cover the cost.

== Career ==
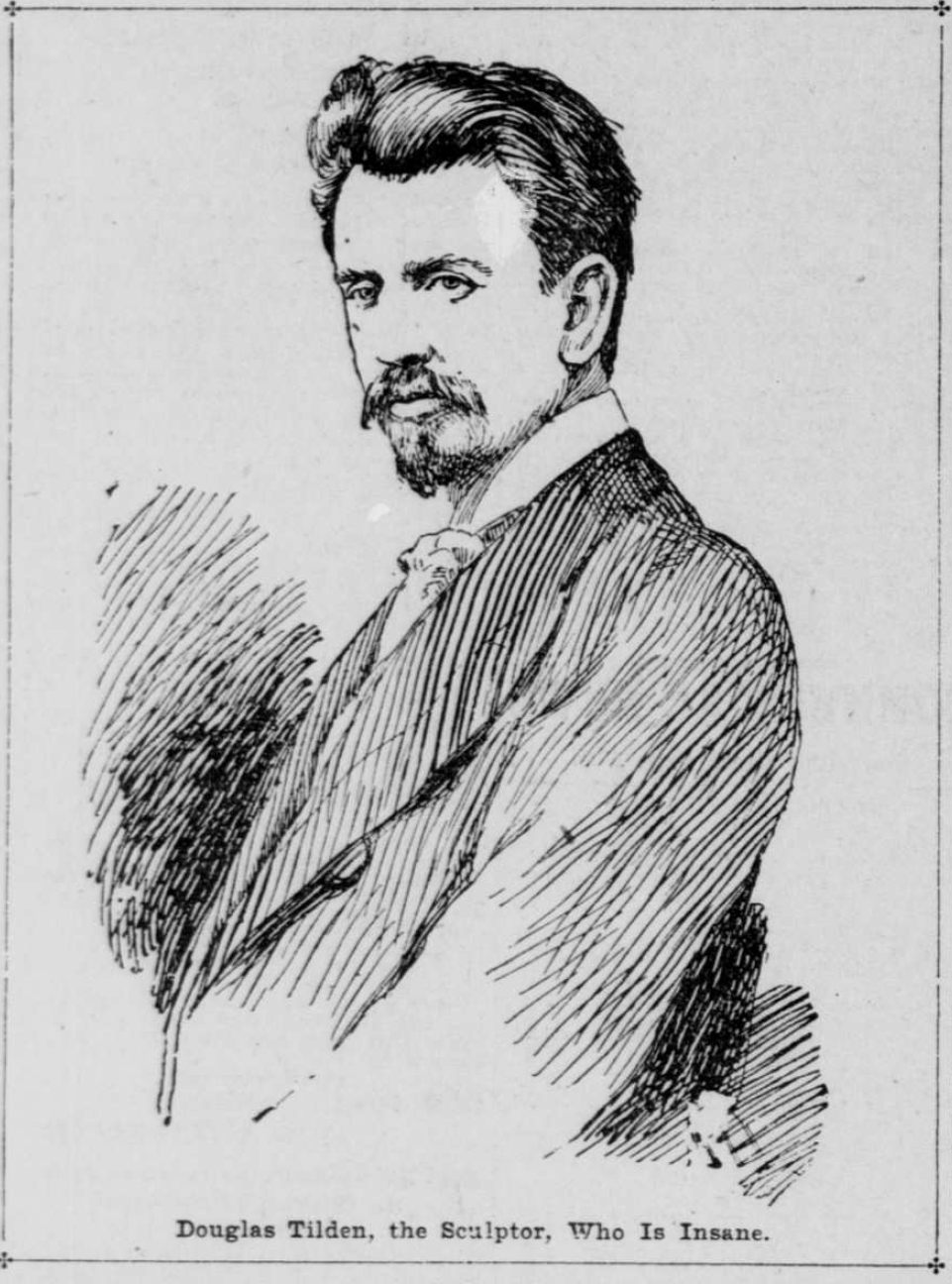
Illustration of Tilden from 1901

Tilden was first recognized for his sculpture while in Paris. His first exhibited work, entitled The National Game, also known as The Baseball Player, or The Ball Player, was a sculpture of a baseball pitcher in his windup. The sculpture was admitted to the prestigious Salon event in 1889, where it won a medal. This was followed by The Tired Boxer (exhibited at the Salon Paris in 1890), The Young Acrobat (Salon 1891), The Bear Hunt (Salon 1892), and The Football Players (Salon 1893).

Many detect a certain homoeroticism in his works because they feature young athletic men who are often unclothed. In the Football Players, many people have noted that the scene of two young football players, one is injured and resting on the shoulder of another, and the other is tenderly bandaging the wounds, shows the intimate male bonding in sports as of interdependence between the players. The gay and lesbian community has adopted the statue as representing the best ideal of the visible queer community on the Berkeley campus.

He was a member of the National Sculpture Society. The Football Players marked the beginning of Tilden's association with his most important patron, James D. Phelan, who commissioned Tilden's next major work after returning to the Bay Area, the Admission Day fountain installed on Market Street in 1897, also known as The Native Son's Fountain. Tilden produced twelve models for Phelan; in a statement following the unveiling ceremony, Tilden said "God Almighty has given me a certain amount of grey-matter, and I was expected to return it with interest. To know that my work is appreciated is all the reward that I care for."

Tilden's next major commission was for James Mervyn Donohue, in memory of his father, Peter Donohue. The Mechanics Monument commission followed Native Son's unveiling, and Lorado Taft said he could "feel only admiration for the ardent and intrepid sculptor who wrought this wonder in [six] brief months" despite "its lawless composition and its ragged contour".

In 1901, Tilden was declared "violently insane" after an incident at his father-in-law's house where he without warning "began destroying the furniture in the room" in which his family was gathered. The incident had been exaggerated by a household servant. Tilden had returned home early and, forgetting his key, had entered the house through an open window. The servant, who had been recently hired and believed this to be uncharacteristic of his employer, locked Tilden in his room, and Tilden attempted to alert others that he was trapped by hammering on the door. The frightened servant then called for the police, who took Tilden away to a mental hospital.

Between 1915, when he contributed Modern Civilization, a frieze for the Panama–Pacific Exposition of 1915, and 1925, when he began work on the unfinished The Bridges, Tilden lost interest in creating art. After separating from his wife Bessie in 1918, Tilden moved into his studio and worked for the Hal Roach Studio, sculpting animals for movie sets. After their divorce was finalized in 1926, Tilden became reclusive, eating little and sculpting by candlelight until friends discovered his hardships and secured a state pension for him. The Bridges was an allegory celebrating the joining of two cities, planned to commemorate the completion of the San Francisco–Oakland Bay Bridge, but he died before it was completed.

Selected bronzes by Douglas Tilden
Name	Year	City	Location	Description/Notes	Image	References
The Ball Player	1889	San Francisco	Golden Gate Park	Tilden's first major work. Also known as The National Game or The Baseball Player.		
The Tired Boxer	1890	San Francisco	de Young Museum	Smaller version made by Tiffany & Co. of the life-size sculpture purchased by and displayed in Olympic Club, which was destroyed in 1906 San Francisco earthquake and fire.		
The Young Acrobat	1891	Washington, D.C.	Smithsonian American Art Museum	A young baby held aloft by a disembodied arm. Previously exhibited in Golden Gate Park.		
Bear Hunt	1892	Fremont	California School for the Deaf	AKA The Bear Hunters. A statue of a bear protecting her cub and wrestling with two Native Americans.		
The Football Players	1893	Berkeley	Strawberry Creek	One of the first permanent artworks on the University of California, Berkeley campus. San Francisco Mayor Phelan had purchased a casting of The Football Players and announced that it would be awarded to the college which won the Big Game two consecutive seasons. After Cal defeated Stanford in 1898 and 1899, the monument was dedicated on 12 May 1900.		
Admission Day	1897	San Francisco	Market Street (at Post and Montgomery)	Part of a monument commemorating the admission of California into the United States.		
Mechanics Monument	1901	San Francisco	Market Street (at Battery)	It served as an inspiration for the city to rebuild itself. The fountain was removed at some point and the statue group has been moved a few feet several times.		
Junipero Serra	1906	San Francisco	Golden Gate Park	Also donated by Phelan to San Francisco.		
Spanish–American War Soldier's Monument	1906	Portland, Oregon	Lownsdale Square	Commemorating the volunteers from Oregon who fought in the Spanish–American War.		
California Volunteers	1906	San Francisco	Market Street (at Dolores)	Commemorating the volunteers from California who fought in the Spanish–American War.		
Stephen M. White	1907	San Pedro	Cabrillo Beach	Originally installed in Los Angeles at City Hall. Received contemporary criticism as "topheavy" with a "vehement gesture".		

== Personal life ==
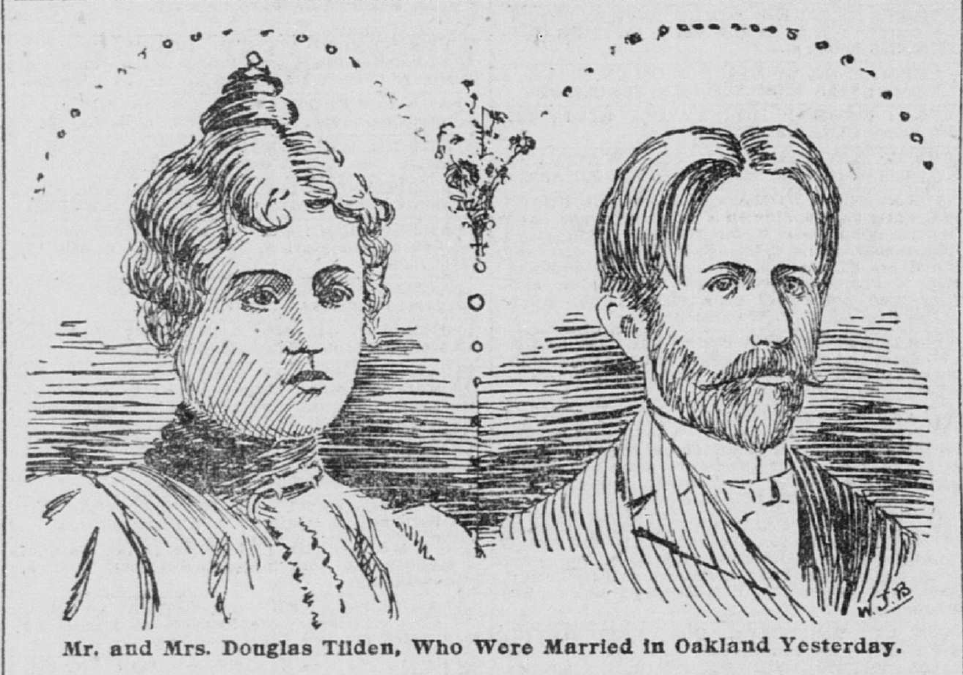
Bessie Cole (L) and Tilden (R), 1896 The San Francisco Call illustration from their marriage

On June 9, 1896, Tilden was married to Elizabeth "Bessie" Cole, a former student of his, also deaf. Although the union produced two children, a daughter Gladys (born January 5, 1900) and a son Willoughby Lee (born September 4, 1903), it was not to prove to be a happy one. Over the years Mrs. Tilden was subject to "melancholia spells" which, among other things, placed a large amount of pressure on the relationship. They separated and Mrs. Tilden, who for years had managed their properties, rented out his studio to a theater group, forcing Tilden to do his sculpting in a shed.

As they grew farther apart Tilden's lawyer wrote: "Furthermore, the wife (Bessie) has knowledge of indiscressions [sic] in the personal conduct of Mr. Tilden which would deprive him of any capacity to stand in court, as we say, "with clean hands." Mr. Tilden claims that Mrs. Tilden has been indiscrete [sic]." The couple separated in 1918, and Bessie subsequently filed for divorce in 1924, which was finalized in 1926.

Tilden was found dead in his Berkeley studio on August 6, 1935; he had died of a heart attack while trying to heat water. He is buried in the Cole family plot of Mountain View Cemetery in Oakland, California, with his ex-wife Bessie (died 1949) and son Willoughby (died 1931). He was survived by his daughter, Gladys Tilden, who had a notable career in the fashion industry prior to World War II. She researched the lives of her father and Eliza Farnham, first female matron of Sing Sing Prison. In 1988, suffering from Alzheimer's disease, she become a ward of Alameda County in 1988 and she died in 1989. Her papers are housed in the Bancroft Library

In 2017, the Tilden Hotel at Taylor & O'Farrell in San Francisco was renamed to honor Douglas Tilden; it originally opened as the Linden Hotel in 1928 and was renamed almost immediately to the Hotel Mark Twain.

== See also ==
- Granville Redmond, an artist who also studied under Theophilus d'Estrella at the California School for the Deaf and shared a room with Tilden in Paris
- Melvin Earl Cummings, a sculptor trained by Tilden
