= Admission Day Monument =

Monument in San Francisco, California, U.S.

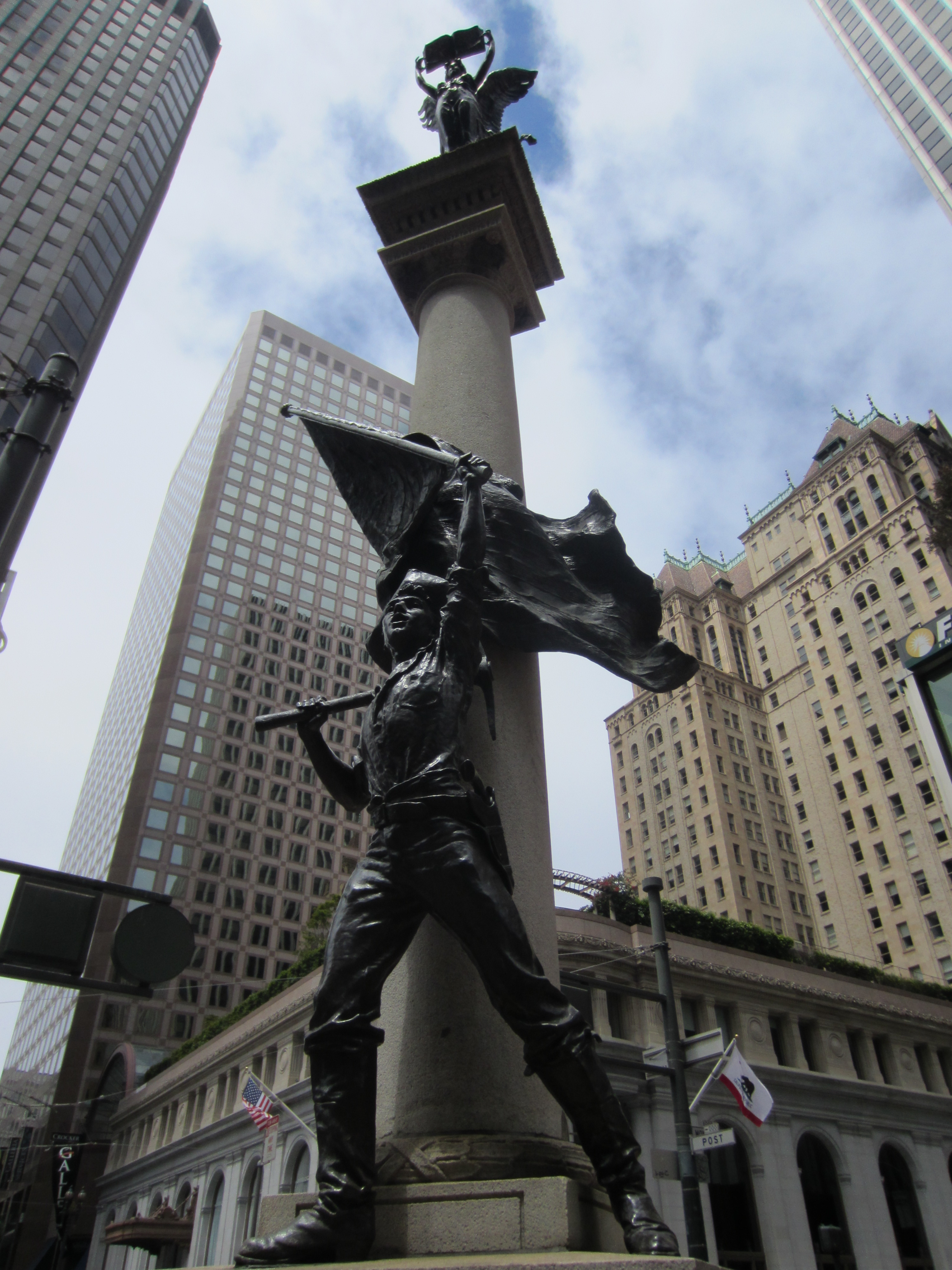
- The Admission Day Monument in 2013
- Location: Market Street and Montgomery Street in San Francisco, California, United States
- Coordinates: 37°47′21″N 122°24′07″W
- Designer: Douglas Tilden
- Type: sculpture
- Material: Bronze; marble; granite
- Completion date: 1897

The Admission Day Monument is an 1897 sculpture by Douglas Tilden, located at the intersection of Market Street and Montgomery Street in San Francisco, California, United States. It commemorates California Admission Day (September 9, 1850), the date on which the state became part of the Union, following the Mexican–American War of 1848.

Other names for the sculpture include Admission Day, the Admission Day Fountain, the California Admissions Day Monument, Native Son Monument, Native Sons' Monument, Native Sons Monument, and Phelan Fountain.

== History ==
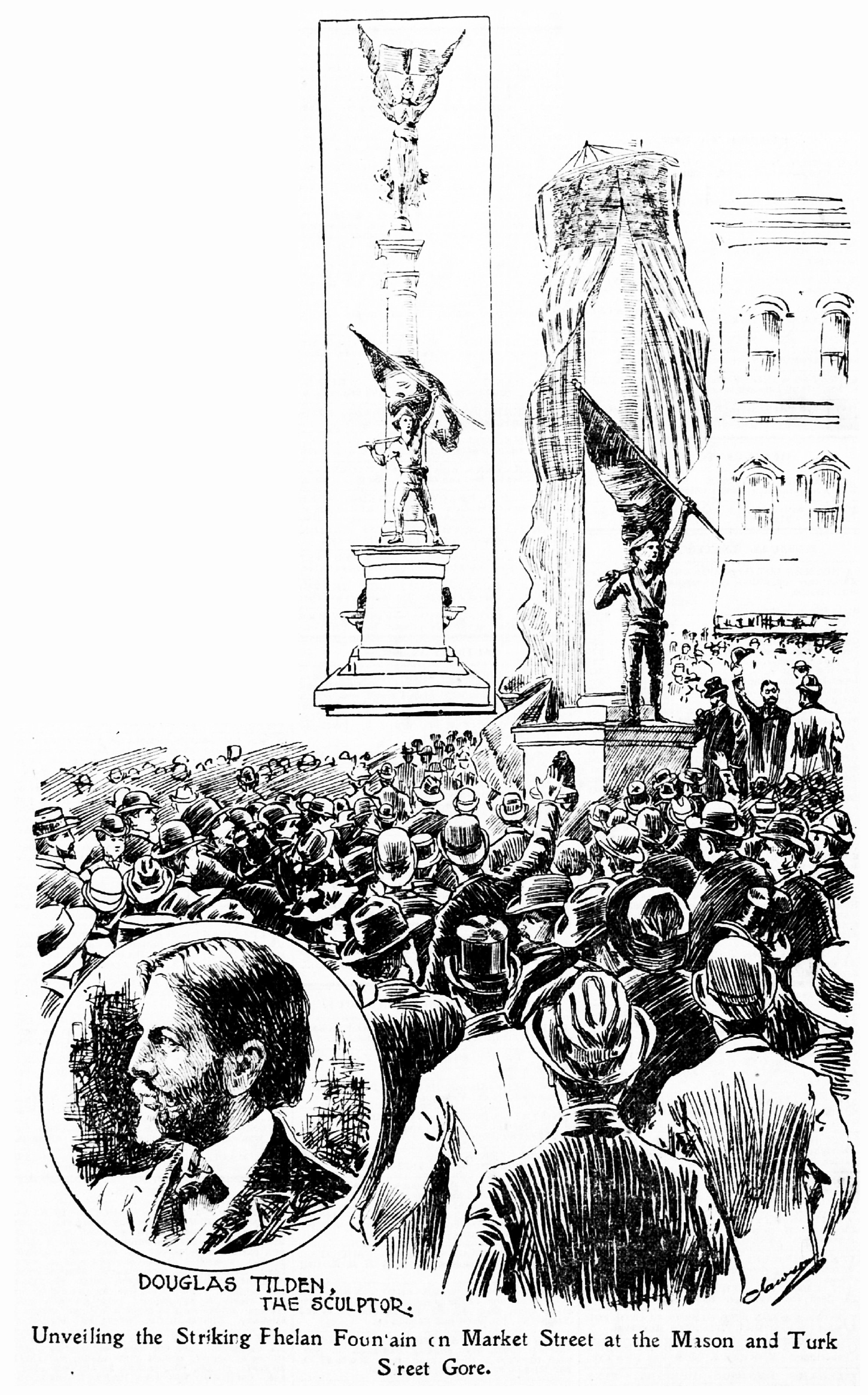
Illustration of the unveiling ceremony, from the San Francisco Call

The work was commissioned from Douglas Tilden by Mayor James D. Phelan, who paid the $12,000 cost of the monument. The monument was announced in November 1895 as "an opportunity [for the public to drink] 'al fresco' in artistic surroundings such as have hitherto been unknown in the far West."

Phelan formally presented the monument in a letter to the Board of Supervisors on February 8, 1896. Although the Board was inclined to accept during a meeting on February 17, they asked Phelan for more details, and he responded with three photographs on February 21, and then by filing plans and specifications on February 27. The Board referred the matter to the Committee on Streets, who recommended acceptance at the next Board meeting on March 2. The Board accepted the recommendation and filed Resolution No. 13,902 formally accepting the gift from Phelan and naming it the Phelan Fountain.

The monument was unveiled on September 5, 1897 at Market, Turk and Mason Streets, and dedicated to the Native Sons of the Golden West on September 9, 1897. Mayor Phelan insisted that no display, speeches, or parade should accompany the presentation ceremony, and presented the monument to Supervisor T. A. Rottanzi, who accepted it in behalf of the citizens of San Francisco at 11:00 a.m.

Communication from Hon. James D. Phelan

San Francisco February 8, 1896.

To the Honorable the Board of Supervisors
Of the City and County of San Francisco—

GENTLEMEN: I hereby tender the City and County of San Francisco a fountain constructed of marble and bronze, emblematic of the Admission of California into the Union, designed by Douglas Tilden, sculptor, to be erected by me, with your consent, at the junction of Market, Turk and Mason streets and to be forever maintained by the city as a drinking fountain. The model may be seen by your committee at the sculptor's studio.
Yours respectfully,

JAS. D. PHELAN.

In 1948 it was moved to Golden Gate Park, and in 1977 returned to Market Street at its present location, on the initiative of the Native Sons.

== Design ==
When initially installed, the monument rested on a square foundation 15 feet (4.6 m) on a side and 10 feet (3.0 m) deep, and had three steps up to a central stone pedestal bearing engraved panels, topped by a doric column and the bronze sculptures. The three steps totaled 1.5 feet (0.46 m) from ground level. From the top step, the top of the pedestal was 6 feet (1.8 m) tall; the pillar added another 18.5 feet (5.6 m), and the bronze atop the pedestal is 9 feet (2.7 m), so the overall height of the monument was 35 feet (11 m). When the monument was reinstalled at Market and Montgomery in the 1970s, the square foundation and steps were not restored, making the overall height of the monument now 33.5 feet (10.2 m).

The lower bronze sculpture depicts a miner who is waving an American flag and carrying a gun. In the original design, the miner represents the Youth of California or the Native Sons of the Golden West, waving his hat in his left hand and "cheering lustily in triumphant enthusiasm". In the finished work, the Native Son is carrying the American flag on the left shoulder and has a miner's pickaxe slung on the other.

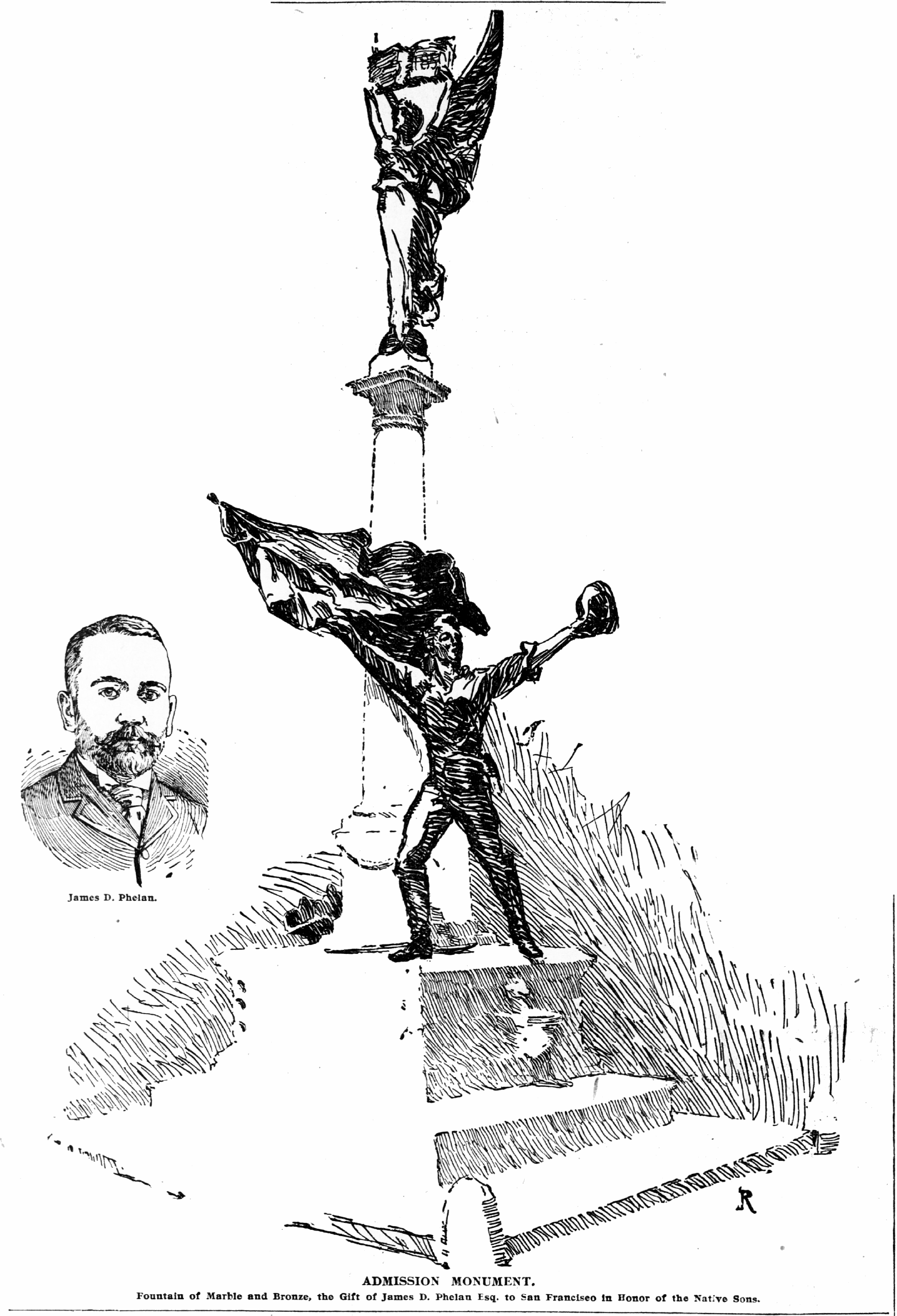
Tilden's design sketch for Admission Day

Above him – atop the column – stands the Genius of California (modeled after the sculptor's wife) that blesses the union, standing on a bronze ball and holding an open book with the admission date of September 9, 1850 inscribed inside. According to the design concept, the marble column is 35 feet (11 m) tall, and each figure is approximately 7 feet (2.1 m) tall. A contemporary news account called the planned design "graceful, light and symmetrical; it has the effect of tapering toward the apex, and yet the effect appears to be entirely unstudied."

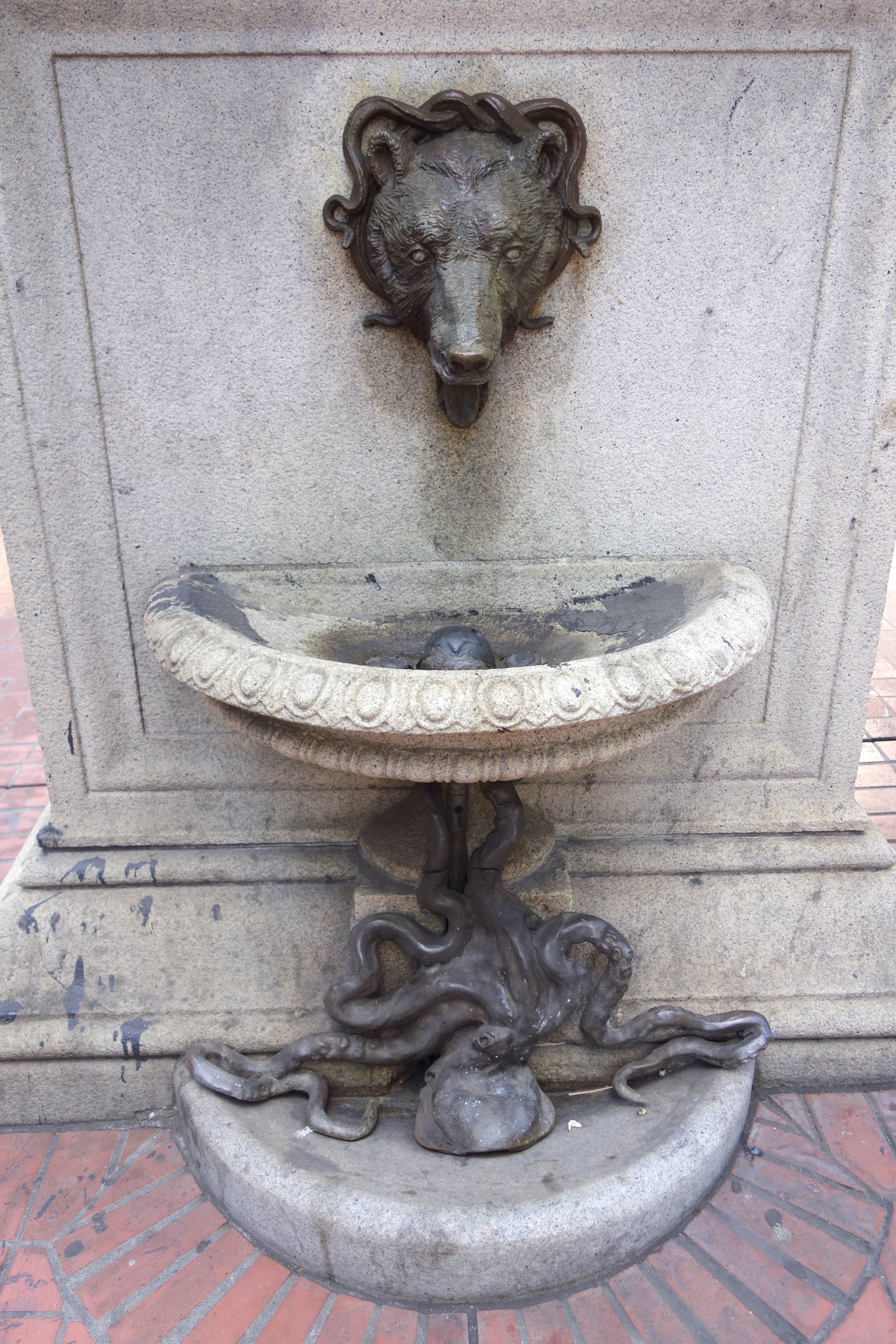
Bear head and octopus sculptures on the base of the monument

The column and base were designed by Willis Polk. The pedestal features two bronze bear heads, with water issuing from their mouths. The bear heads are surrounded by rattlesnakes, symbolizing the Sierra Nevada mountains and "the attendant dangers of the wild Western life"; as originally installed, handles held between the bears' teeth could be pulled to release water from the heads of the snakes, where they would be caught in cups decorated with a buffalo motif for drinking. There are two octopus sculptures at the very bottom of the monument, although these are not mentioned in Tilden's 1897 description.

The quote inscribed on the pedestal is from a speech by William H. Seward in the US Senate on March 11, 1850, arguing for the admission of California: "The perpetual unity of the Empire hangs on the decision of this day." The quote has been characterized as imperialistic. The other side of the pedestal is engraved with the dedication: "This Fountain is dedicated to the Native Sons of the Golden West to commemorate the admission of California into the Union on the Ninth of September, Anno Domini MDCCCL."

== In media ==
The Native Sons' monument met Lotta's Fountain in a fanciful 1898 children's story published by the San Francisco Call entitled "The Three Fountains". In the story, Sinbad and the Lob-Lolly are touring San Francisco when Sinbad announces his thirst and the Lob-Lolly responds by calling Lotta's Fountain over to them. After it arrives, it is able to dispense "the best ice-cold soda water" for all the children until it starts to run low, whereupon it walks over to the Native Sons' monument to ask for help. The Native Sons' monument dispensed soda for the girls, and the boys were directed to the Cogswell Fountain (which stood at California and Market, but had been torn down in 1894 by an angry mob). The Cogswell Fountain also gave what was first thought to be soda water to the boys, but which turned out to be castor oil.

== See also ==
- 1897 in art
