= Market Street (San Francisco) =

Street in San Francisco, California

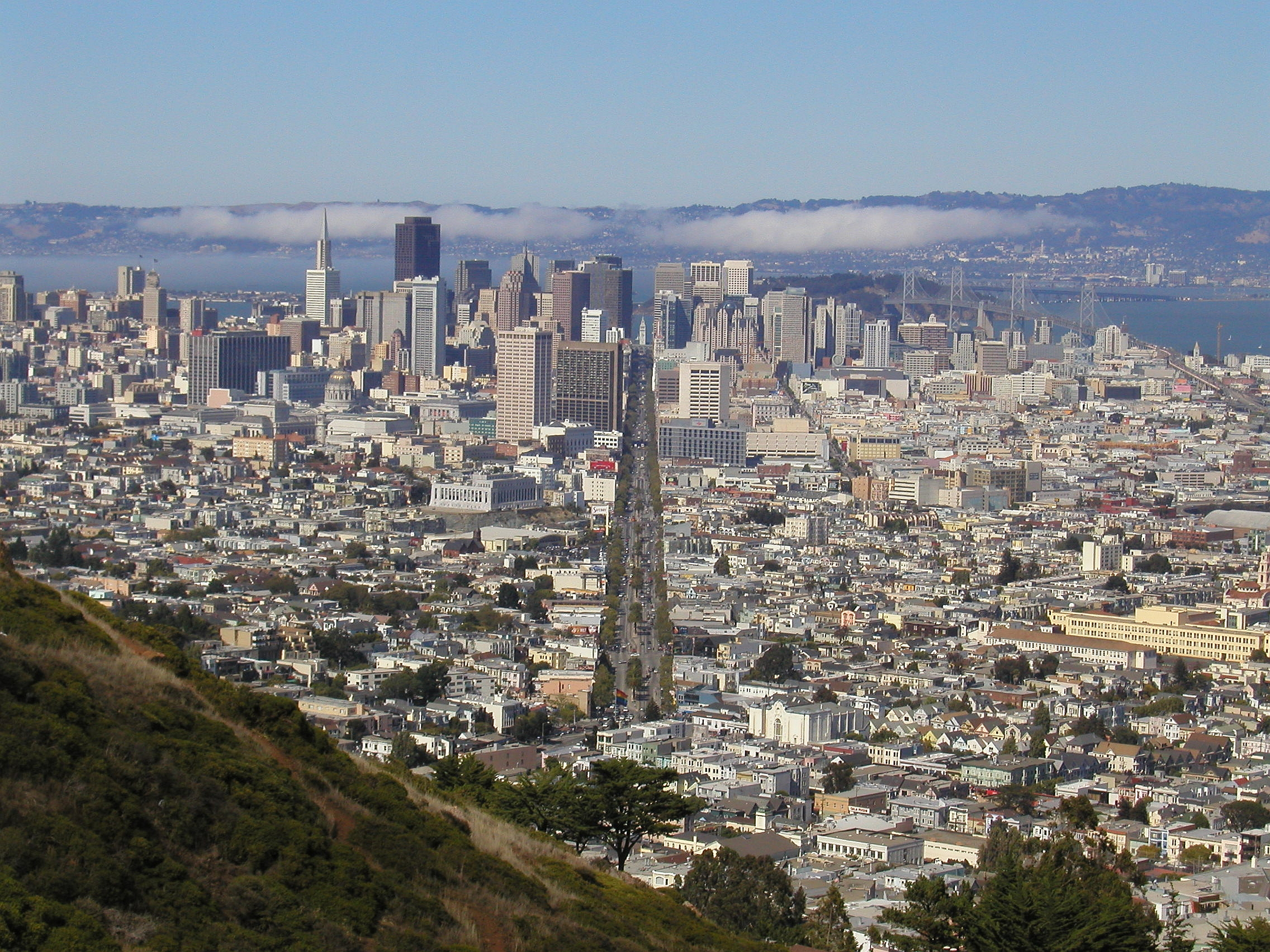
- Market Street is conspicuous in the view from Twin Peaks.
- Interactive map of Market Street
- Owner: City and County of San Francisco
- Maintained by: San Francisco DPW
- Length: 3 mi (4.8 km)
- Location: San Francisco, California
- Nearest metro station: Embarcadero Station; Montgomery Street Station; Powell Street Station; Civic Center/UN Plaza station
- North East end: The Embarcadero
- South West end: Portola Drive

Construction
- Commissioned: 1847

Other
- Designer: Jasper O'Farrell

Market Street is a major thoroughfare in San Francisco, California. It begins at The Embarcadero in front of the Ferry Building at the northeastern edge of the city and runs southwest through downtown, passing the Civic Center and the Castro District, to the intersection with Portola Drive in the Twin Peaks neighborhood. Beyond this point, the roadway continues into the southwestern quadrant of San Francisco. Portola Drive extends south to the intersection of St. Francis Boulevard and Sloat Boulevard, where it continues as Junipero Serra Boulevard.

Market Street is the boundary of two street grids. Streets on its southeast side are parallel or perpendicular to Market Street, while those on the northwest are nine degrees off from the cardinal directions.

Market Street is a major transit artery for the city of San Francisco, and has carried in turn horse-drawn streetcars, cable cars, electric streetcars, electric trolleybuses, and diesel buses. Today Muni's buses, trolleybuses, and heritage streetcars (on the F Market line) share the street, while below the street the two-level Market Street subway carries Muni Metro and Bay Area Rapid Transit (BART). While cable cars no longer operate on Market Street, the surviving cable car lines terminate directly adjacent to the street at its intersections with California Street and Powell Street.

== History ==
=== Initial surveying and clearing ===
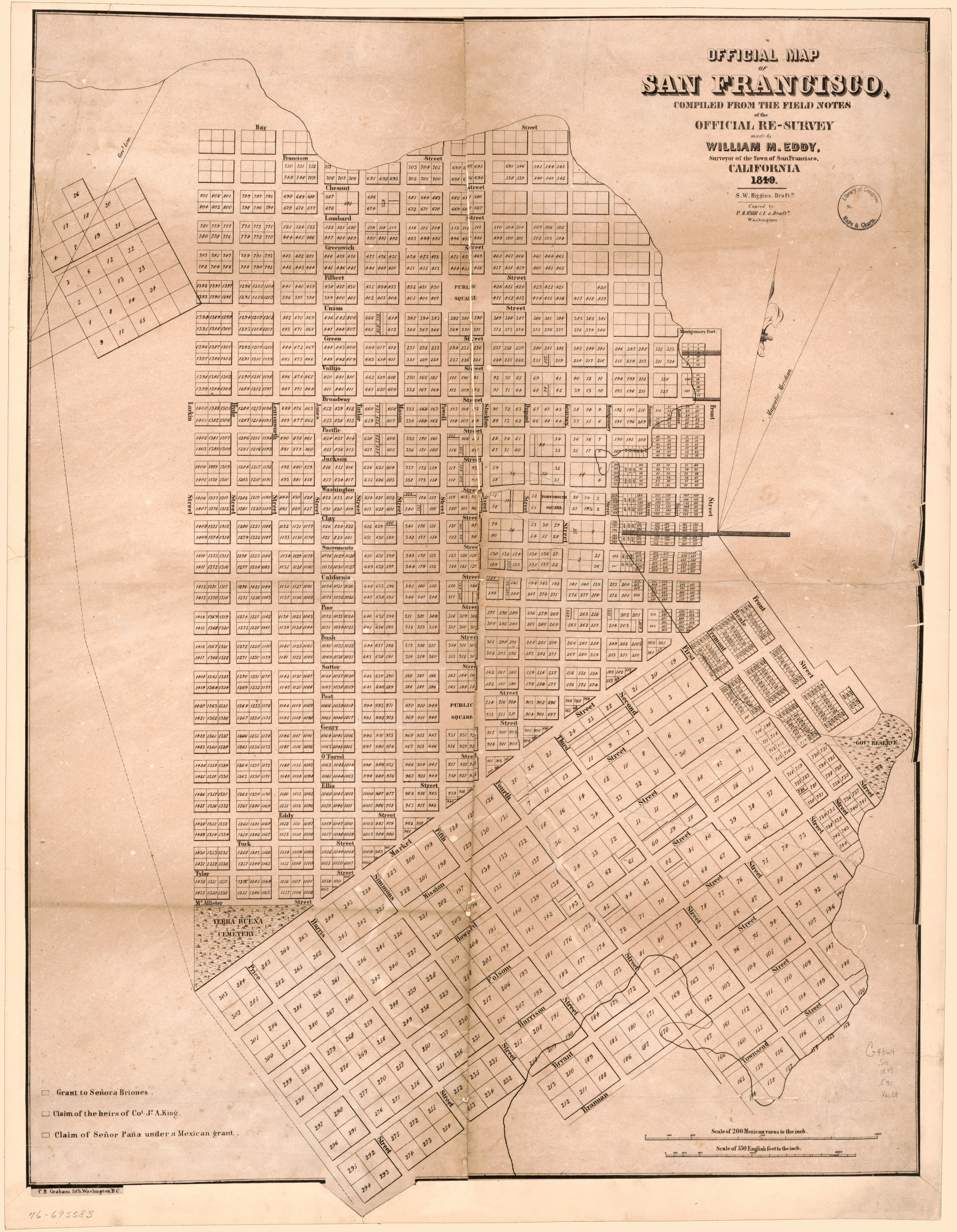
The official map of San Francisco (1849), as surveyed by Jasper O'Farrell in 1847. Market Street is the prominent dividing line between the north-south grid laid by Jean Jacques Vioget and the grid of Happy Valley aligned with Mission Street.

In 1839, the first street grid was laid in the Mexican trading post of Yerba Buena by Jean Jacques Vioget, largely aligned with the cardinal directions, with blocks measuring 412 by 275 feet (126 by 84 m). Yerba Buena was renamed to San Francisco in 1847 after it was captured by United States troops during the Mexican–American War. Market Street, which cuts across the city for three miles (4.8 km) from the waterfront to the hills of Twin Peaks, was laid out originally in an 1847 survey by Jasper O'Farrell, a 26-year-old trained civil engineer who had immigrated there.

Market Street was described at the time as an arrow aimed straight at "Los Pechos de la Chola" (the Breasts of the Maiden), now called Twin Peaks. Property owners forced O'Farrell to retain the earlier Vioget-drawn north-south Yerba Buena street grid rather than conform the roads to the hilly topography; they also forced him to establish the diagonally-offset grid south of Market with larger 600-by-400-foot (180 by 120 m) blocks aligned with Mission Street for Happy Valley. Market was laid out to transition between the two competing street grids, parallel to and one block north of Mission.

O'Farrell first repaired Vioget's original layout of the settlement centered around Portsmouth Square, and then established Market Street as the widest street in town: 120 feet (37 m) between property lines. However, the width of Market also aroused the ire of property owners, who felt the new street was excessively wide and potentially encroached on their holdings; they made preparations to lynch O'Farrell. In Forgotten Pioneers, T. F. Prendergast recounts:

When the engineer had completed his map of Market Street and the southern part of the city, what was regarded as the abnormal width of the proposed street excited part of the populace, and an indignation meeting was held to protest against the plan as wanton disregard for rights of landowners; and the mob, for such it was, decided for lynch law. A friend warned O'Farrell before the crowd had dispersed. He rode with all haste to North Beach, took a boat for Sausalito, and thence put distance behind him on fast horses in relay until he reached his retreat in Sonoma. He found it discreet to remain some time in the country before venturing to return to the city.

At the time, the Market Street right-of-way was blocked by a sixty-foot sand dune where the Palace Hotel is now (at the intersection with New Montgomery), and a hundred yards further west stood a second sandhill nearly ninety feet tall. The dunes were leveled between 1852–54 and 1859–73, first by James Cunningham, who was responsible for levelling the area around Second and Montgomery, and then by David "Steam Paddy" Hewes; Hewes purchased the steam shovel (nicknamed "Steam Paddy" as it was reputed to be able to do the work of a dozen Irishmen) that had been brought to San Francisco by Cunningham during the earlier period.

The sand removed was used to fill Yerba Buena Cove between Portsmouth Square and Happy Valley at First and Mission Street; Mission Bay at Fourth and Townsend; and for the construction of the San Francisco and San Jose Railroad. Over those years, up to 2,500 short tons (2,300 t) of sand were moved per day, clearing approximately 5,000 acres (2,000 ha) of sand dunes, some of which had risen up to 60 feet (18 m) above the present-day level of Market Street.

=== Growth ===
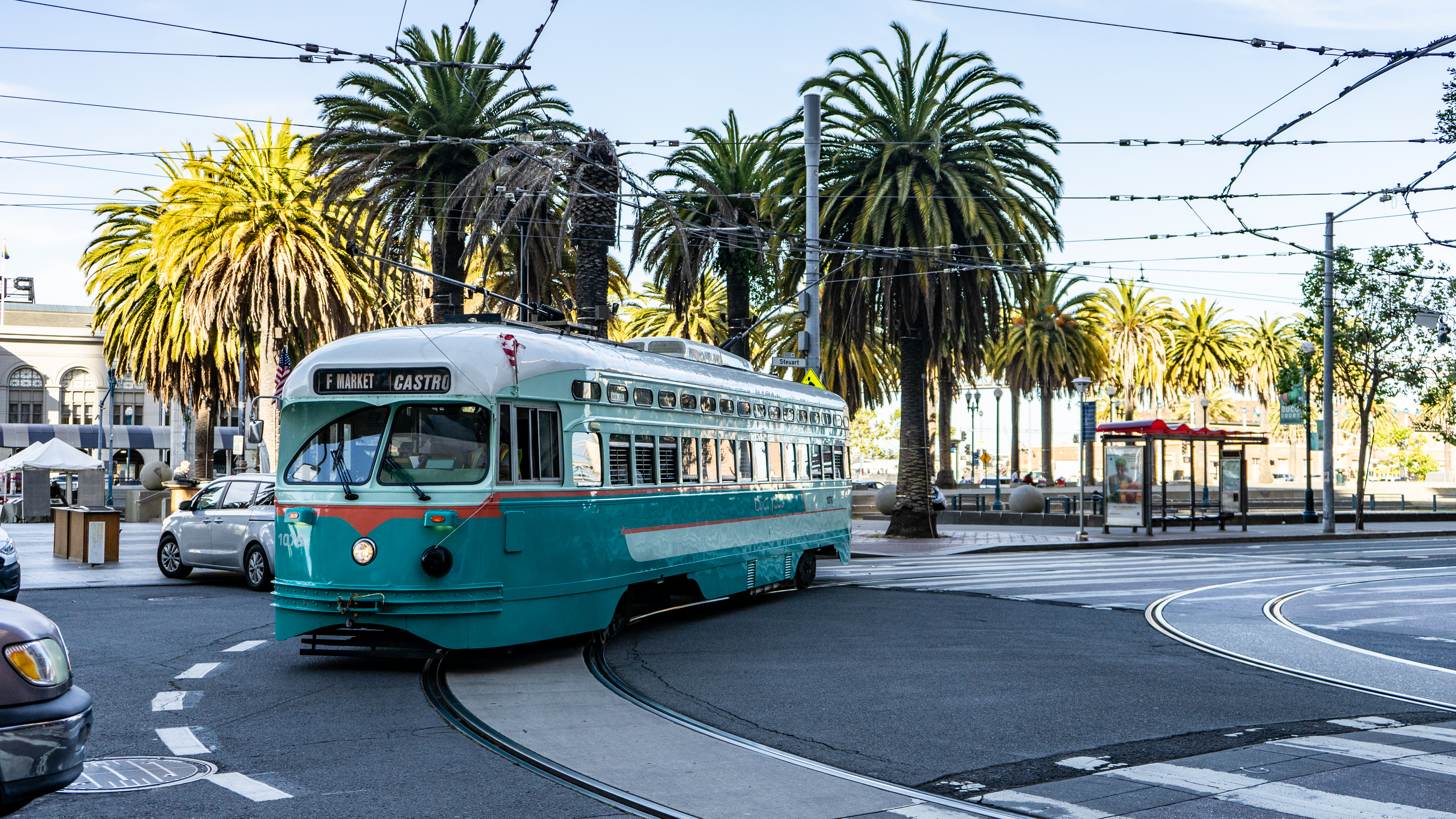
An F Market streetcar turns at the foot of Market Street, in front of the Ferry Building

Hewes was also granted the right to lay tracks on Market to Beale to carry away the sand he was clearing. The Hewes Steam Paddy line carried 150 short tons (140 t) of sand per 18-car load, with trains running every half-hour.

The first horsecar-powered railway line to open in San Francisco commenced running down the thoroughfare on July 4, 1860, operating under the Market Street Railroad Company. By 1918 Muni was in direct competition with the United Railroads of San Francisco (the successor company to the Market Street RailRoad Company) down the length of Market Street; the two operators each operated their own pair of rail tracks down that thoroughfare, which came to be known as the 'roar of the four'. The two Union Railroad tracks were on the inside and the two San Francisco Municipal Railway tracks were on the outside.

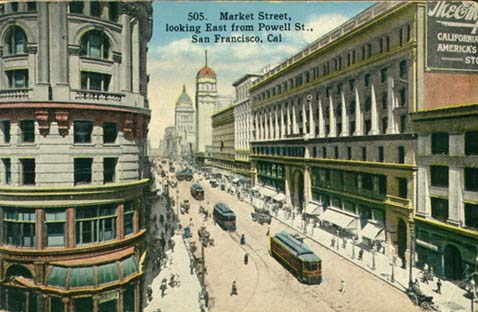
Market Street, pictured on a postcard, c. 1900. At the near left, the Flood Building at Powell Street. The Emporium is to the right.

In 1892 The Owl Drug Company was established at 1128 Market Street and later grew into a leading American drugstore retailer.

=== Earthquake and fire ===
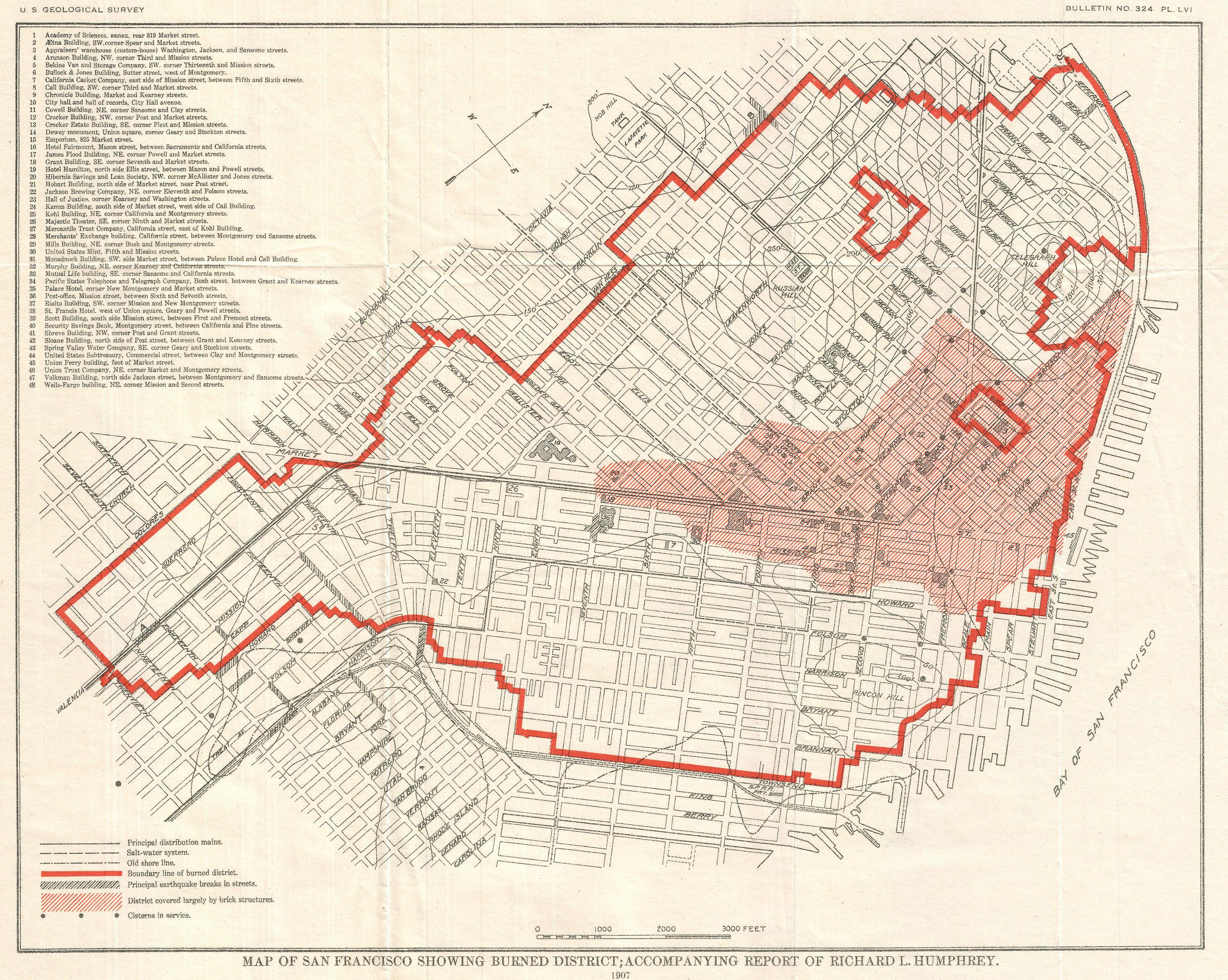
Boundary of destruction following the 1906 San Francisco earthquake and fire

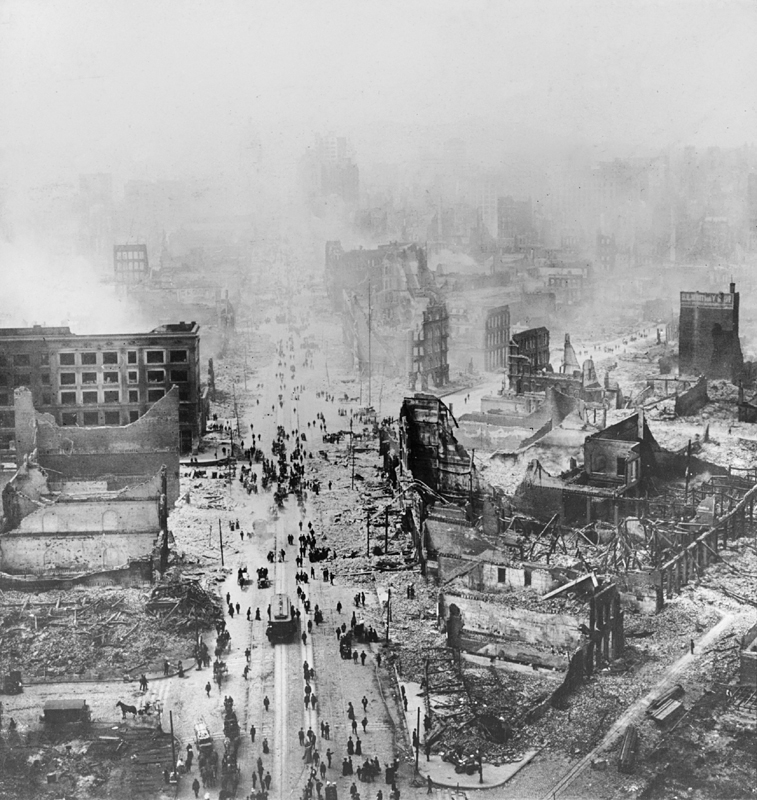
View southwest along Market (1906)

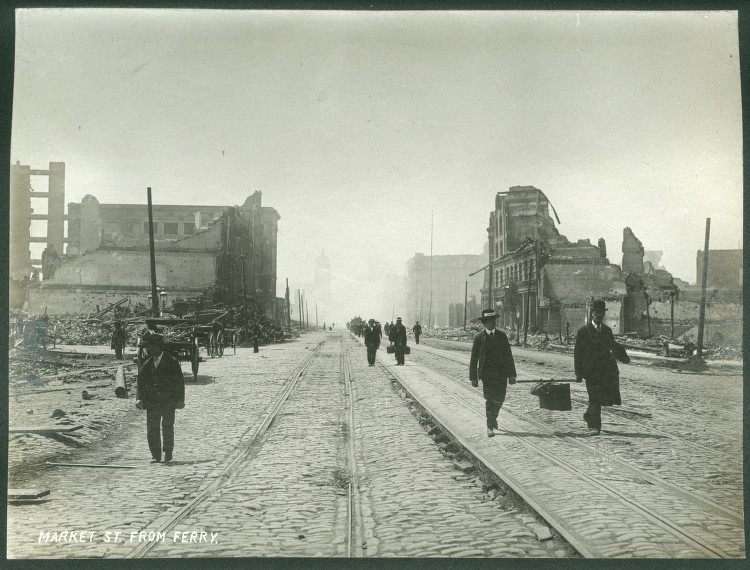
Market, view southwest from near Ferry Building (1906)

Early in the morning of April 18, 1906, an earthquake lasting less than a minute and subsequent fire left many of the buildings along Market Street in ruins; in some cases, buildings were dynamited to prevent the spread of flames. The burned area extended from Dolores and Franklin east to the waterfront. Within days, prominent citizens and property owners announced plans to rebuild their buildings along Market. United Railroads traffic was temporarily rerouted to Fillmore Street, and repairs to the tracks on Market were underway by April 22.

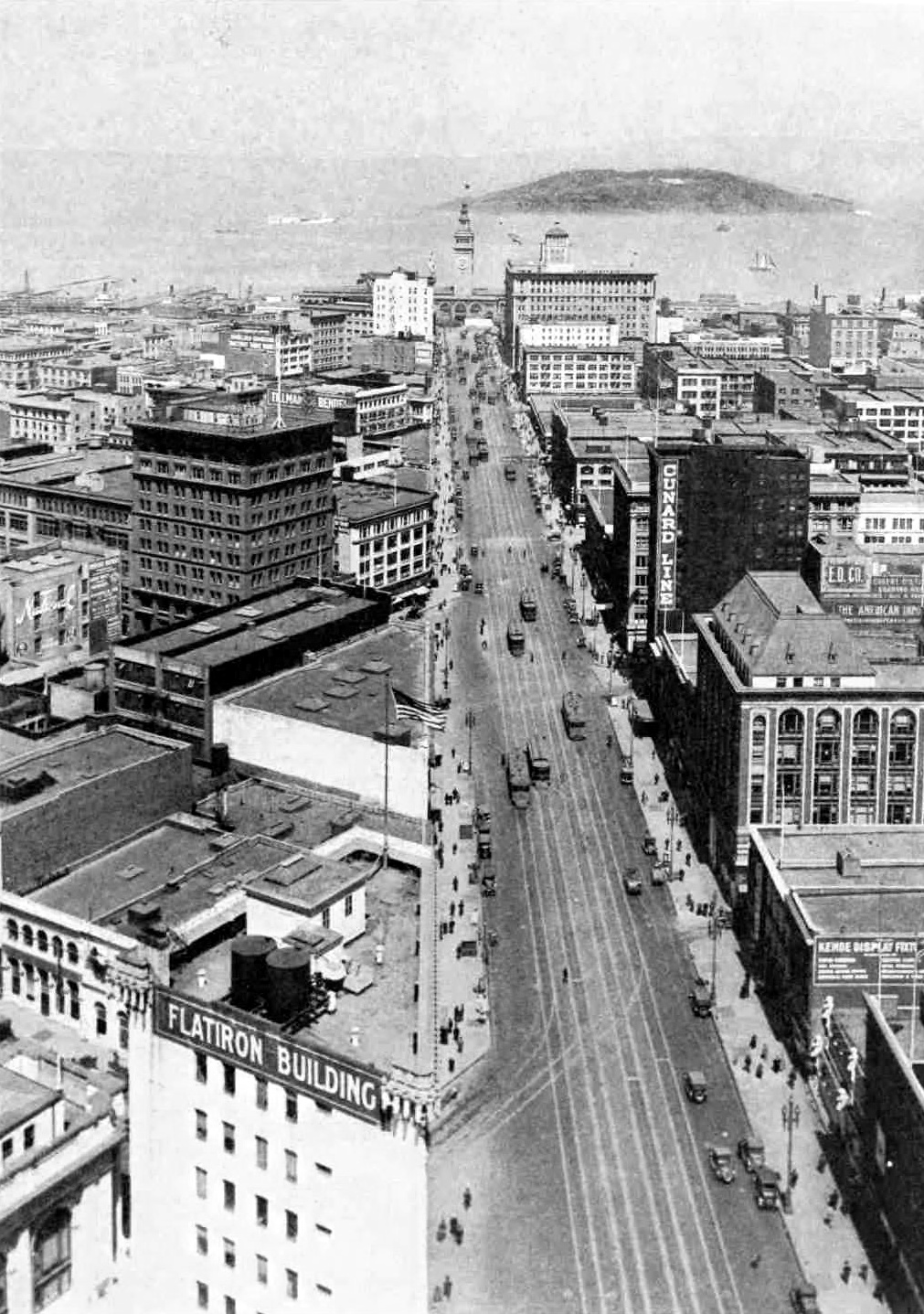
Looking down Market Street toward the bay in 1922

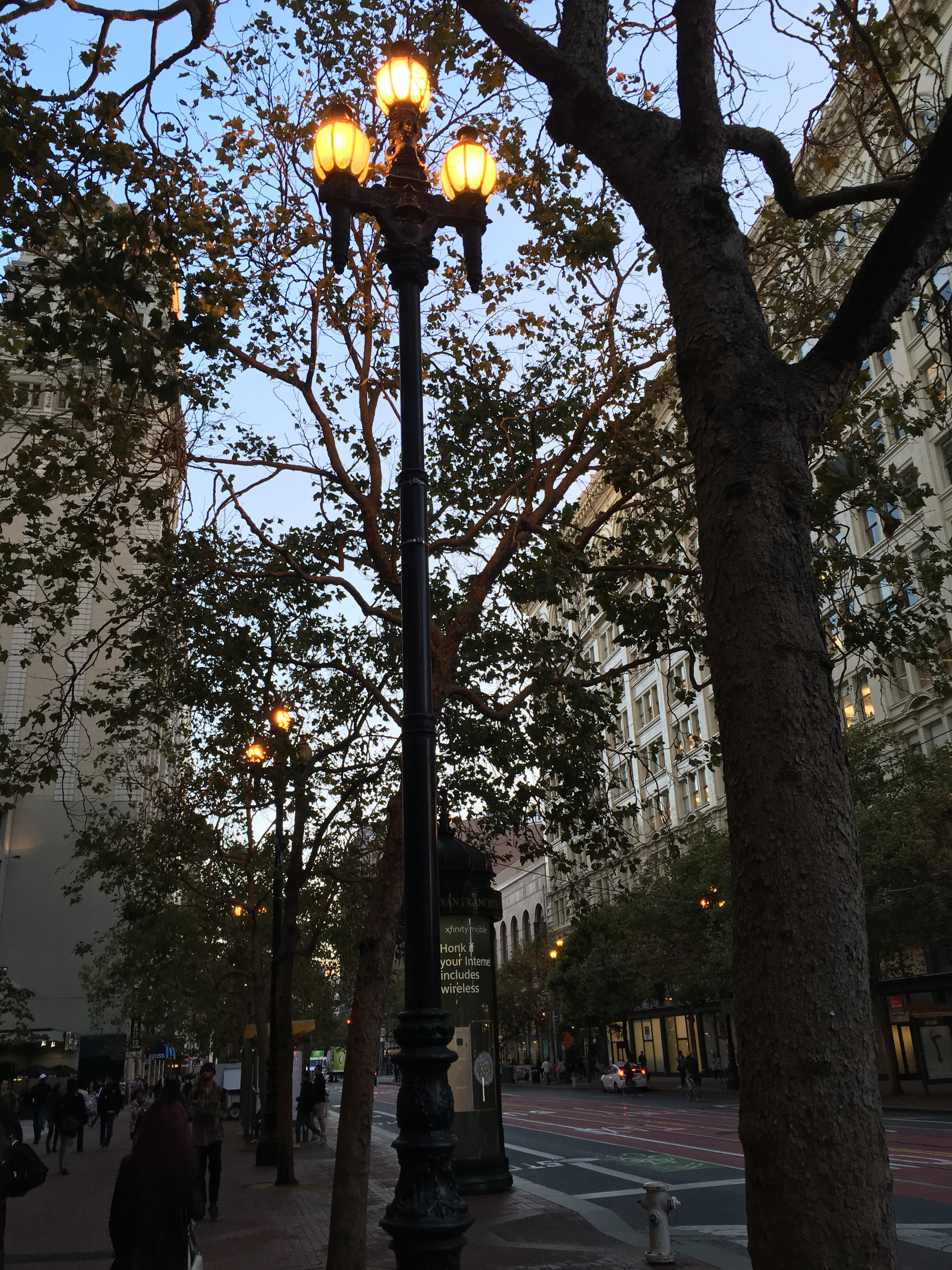
The Path of Gold street lamps (2018)

Willis Polk designed the Path of Gold Street Lamps in 1908 for United Railways’ trolley poles with street lights. The tops were designed in 1916 by sculptor Leo Lentelli and engineer Walter D'Arcy Ryan. The Winning of the West bases were designed by sculptor Arthur Putnam and feature three historical subjects: covered wagons, mountain lions, and alternating prospectors and Indians. The City required the highly ornamental poles to permit the much-opposed overhead trolley wires.

=== Market Street Redevelopment Plan ===
Shortly after voters approved the creation of the Bay Area Rapid Transit District in 1962, the report What to Do About Market Street was published by the San Francisco Planning and Urban Renewal Association (SPUR). A group of businessmen and property owners had commissioned SPUR to lead a team of city planners, designers, and real estate experts to form a plan which would "put new life into Market Street as a center of Bay Area business, shopping, and entertainment."

Halprin and Associates, led by landscape architect Lawrence Halprin, was responsible for "The Look of Market Street" chapter in What to Do About Market Street; Halprin took a walk from the waterfront to Van Ness to develop his ideas, and realized "the five Market Streets should have five distinctive characters", making suggestions for each district.

At the same time, the City Planning department commissioned the architecture firm led by Mario Ciampi to create the Downtown Plan, which was published in 1963 and recommended that Market be limited to buses and emergency vehicles; it also called for extending the Central Freeway under Van Ness and the downtown area via a new tunnel. The limited-access Market would extend all the way from The Embarcadero to Van Ness.

The San Francisco Municipal Railway streetcars were moved underground as Muni Metro in concert with the development of the Bay Area Rapid Transit system in the late 1960s. Construction of the Market Street subway commenced in July 1967. Prolonged disruption to what had traditionally been the social and economic center of the city contributed to the decline of the mid-Market shopping district in later years. On June 4, 1968, voters in San Francisco approved Proposition A, which issued $24.5 million in bonds to pay for the reconstruction and improvement of Market Street to follow the completion of the double-decked subway.

In 1980, Muni's surface operations were partially routed underground with full service changes occurring in 1982. While there were initially no plans to retain the surface tracks, several Historic Trolley Festivals in 1980s had proven popular enough to reinstate operations in the form of the F Market historic streetcar line.

=== Traffic changes ===
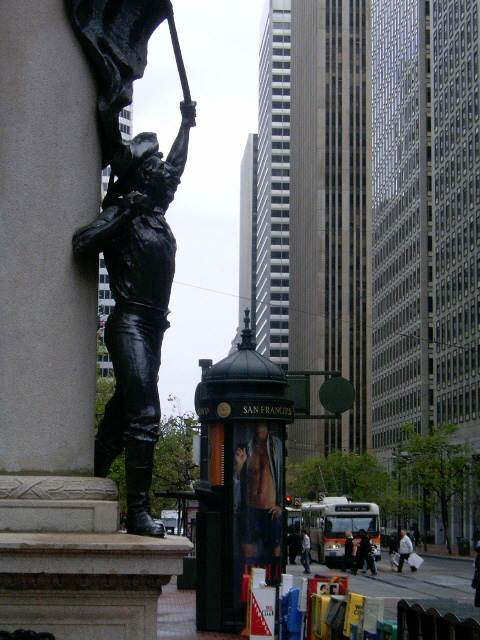
Another view of Market Street in downtown San Francisco, taken near the intersection with Montgomery Street, looking northeast toward the Ferry Building. The foreground bronze is entitled Admission Day, by Douglas Tilden.

On September 29, 2009, traffic-calming efforts took effect for a six-week test in which private automobiles would be restricted in travelling east from Sixth Street towards the Ferry Building. All eastbound traffic was encouraged to turn right onto 10th Street and then required to do so at 8th Street. Eastbound traffic entering Market from Seventh Street was required to exit Market at Sixth. These efforts followed recent urban planning trends seeking to make streets safer and more pleasant. Drivers failing to comply faced fines.

These changes were later made permanent. Planning efforts began in 2012 to ban private automobiles from Market Street altogether between Franklin and Steuart streets, in order to provide a better environment for transit, cyclists, and pedestrians. On August 11, 2015, the city banned private vehicles from turning onto Market Street between Third and Eighth streets.

In December 2013, the city launched free Wi-Fi internet access along Market Street.

=== Better Market Street ===
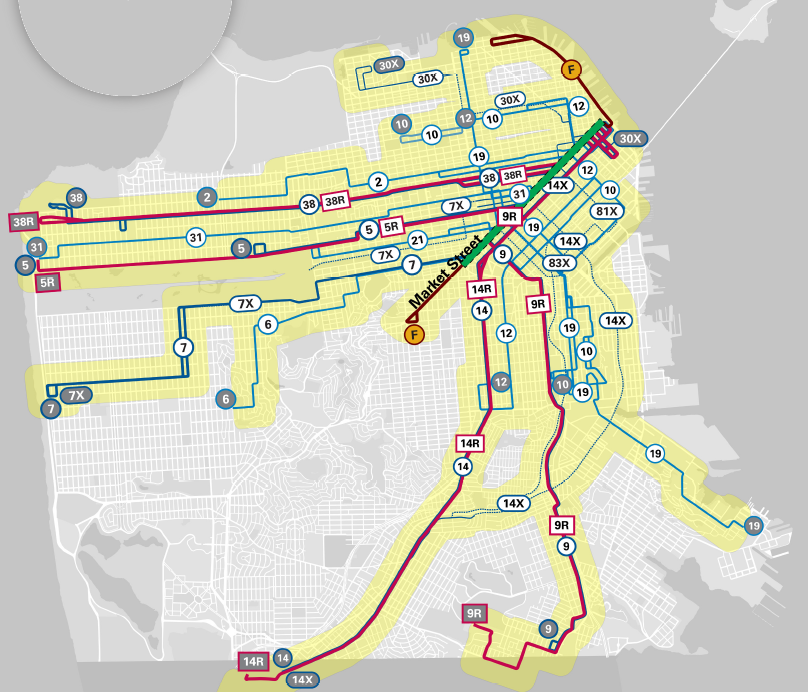
A 2019 map showing all Muni routes that run on Market Street

A project called Better Market Street was started under Gavin Newsom's administration to improve transportation on the corridor for people who walk, use bicycles, or ride public transit. Early efforts included traffic circulations trials in 2009 which disallowed right turns for automobiles on parts of the street. With Newsom stepping down as mayor in 2011, Mayor Ed Lee continued planning for Better Market Street and announced a series of public workshops.

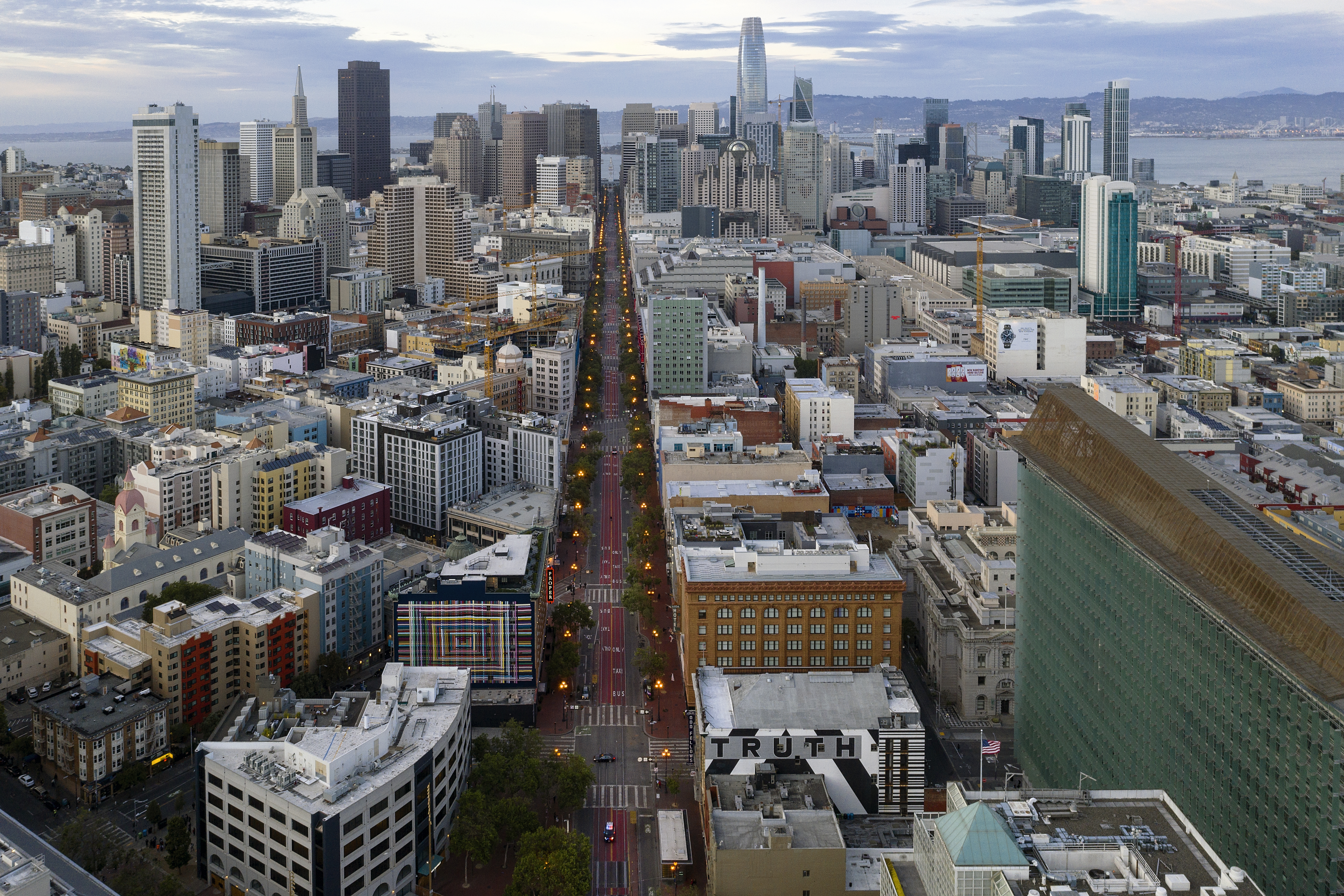
Market Street in May 2020 during the COVID-19 pandemic

Originally, the street redesign was intended to be implemented around 2013-2014 when Market Street was scheduled to be repaved. By 2013 the project had been delayed twice; first to 2015 and subsequently to 2017. After further delays, the most recent iteration of the project began implementation in 2020 under Mayor London Breed's administration.

The project initially proposed three alternative designs for Market Street: two that would provide transit priority and improved bicycle infrastructure in the form of raised cycle tracks, and one that would separate bicycle infrastructure onto Mission Street instead. In 2018, the project was redesigned with a new alternative that would keep the cycle tracks on Market Street but would implement them as sidewalk-level bicycle lanes.

The project would also reconfigure the transit boarding islands for buses and streetcars with two sets of boarding islands: a set on the inside for rapid service with larger stop spacing, and a set on the outside for local service. If implemented fully, the project is expected to cost at least $500 million and also include repaving the sidewalk and reconstructing sewer and utility lines under the street. In March 2019, a draft environmental impact report (EIR) for the project was released, with a final approval for the EIR expected later in 2019. The full plan was approved by the city in October 2019, including a short-term implementation plan that would disallow private automobiles on most of Market Street and a long-term plan that would include rebuilding much of the street.

The transition to a car-free Market Street began on January 29, 2020. Studies released in late February indicated 6-12% travel time savings for transit routes on Market Street after the implementation, with negligible traffic effects on other streets.

== Sectors ==
What to Do About Market Street, published in December 1962, organized Market into five distinct districts, from east to west:

The Five Market Streets
Name	Boundaries		Description
Gateway	Waterfront	Drumm/Main	"...this part of Market Street is quiet. There is relatively little traffic, and there are few pedestrians except during weekday rush hours when Marin commute busses terminate at the Ferry Building. At night the area is deserted except for seamen returning to their ships and elderly male pensioners who live in nearby cheap hotels."
Financial	Drumm/Main	Kearny/3rd	"On weekdays this is a busy portion of Market Street, bustling with prosperous looking businessmen and smartly dressed office girls."
Central Retail	Kearny/3rd	Powell/5th	"Most of the stores cater to the mass market; there are no exclusive specialty shops. The north frontage of the blocks between Kearny and Stockton Streets is occupied by high-grade retail stores and banks, some with offices above them. However, the south side of the street between 3rd and 4th mainly is of a lower quality. Two penny arcades, a cheap movie theater, and one that features risque films tend to downgrade this block face."
Amusement	Powell/5th	Hyde/8th	"The proximity of the Tenderloin is fairly evident. At night, particularly on weekend nights, the young people arrive. The movies, the penny arcades, and principally the bright lights, the glamour, and the excitement of Market Street attract a predominately young crowd including many servicemen and people new in town. The boys prowl Market Street looking for excitement — and for girls; the girls prowl Market Street looking for excitement — and for boys."
General Commercial	Hyde/8th	Van Ness	"With the exceptions noted, the buildings are old and their appearance is drab. The garishness and gaiety of the amusement sector are missing from upper Market Street. Except around the theaters and hotels, the area is fairly quiet both by day and at night."

In 2013, an updated list of six districts was published by the Better Market Street initiative. The list extends the western boundary to Octavia and largely follows the boundaries laid out in 1962:

The Six Market Streets
Name	Boundaries		Description
Embarcadero	Embarcadero	Fremont	"The waterfront terminus of Market Street is celebrated by bringing urban activity to the water, and bringing the unique character of the Ferry Building and water's edge back to the city."
Financial	Fremont	3rd	"It is the most popular destination for weekday users of Market Street and the quietest during evenings and weekends."
Retail	3rd	5th	"This constitutes the main shopping district of the city, attracting locals and visitors alike to the myriad shops, department stores, hotels, and offices."
Mid-Market	5th	7th	"Historic places like the Orpheum and the Warfield are key remnants and reminders of the prior history and identity of this segment of Market Street as an entertainment district."
Civic Center	7th	Van Ness	"Key landmarks and destinations include the Civic Center, United Nations Plaza, the San Francisco Main Library, the Federal Building, and the various arts/cultural destinations that exist around the civic Center on and off Market Street."
Octavia	Van Ness	Octavia	"The scale of the buildings, combined with the mix of uses, provides more of a neighborhood feel than other districts along Market Street."

Market Street is prominently lit by traffic in this view northeast from Twin Peaks at dusk, photographed by Carol Highsmith.

Central Market Community Benefit District extends from Fifth to Ninth Streets, and is considered part of either the "Mid Market" or "South of Market" areas.

== Festivities ==
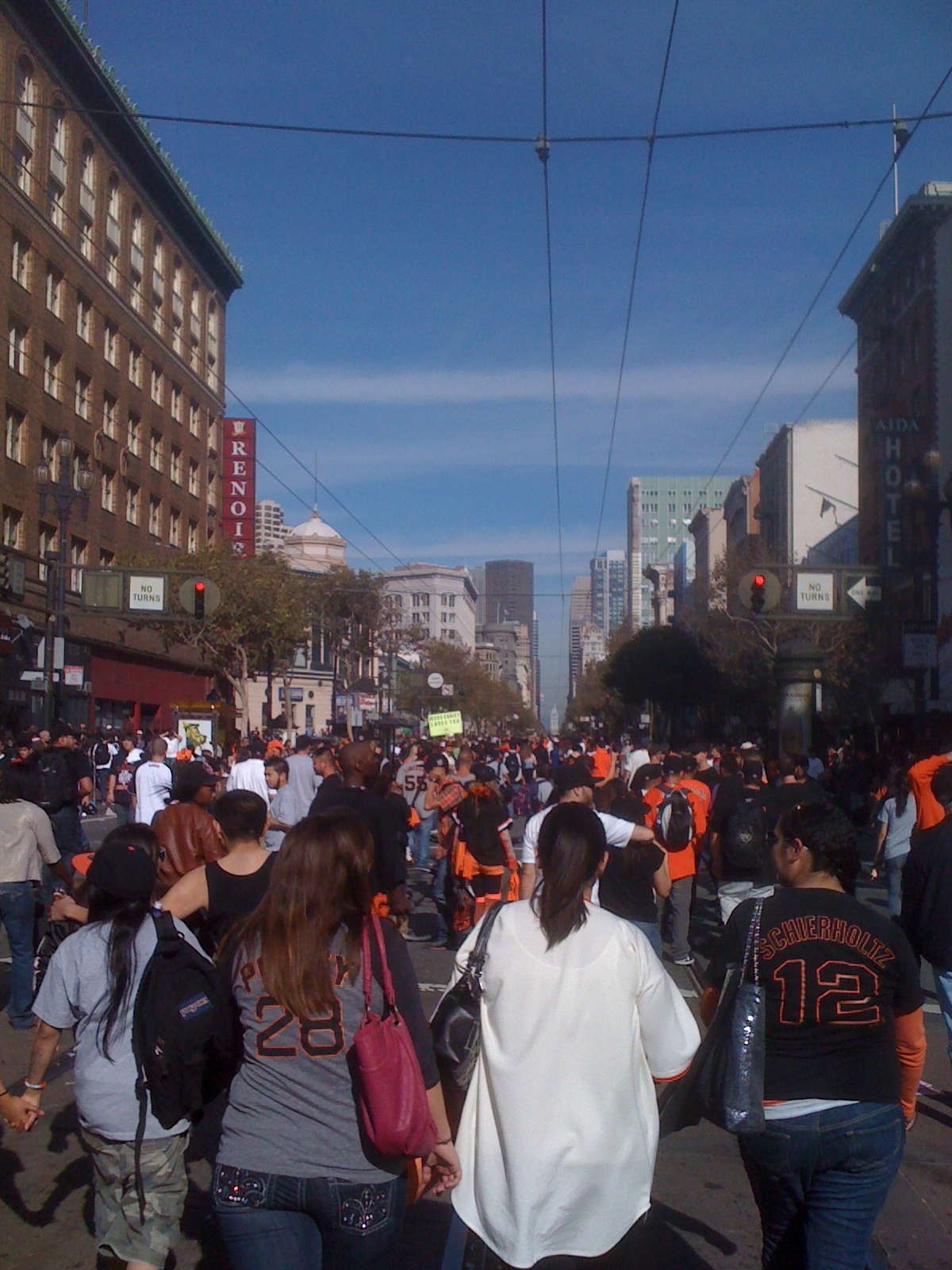
Market Street after the San Francisco Giants World Series win

Market Street parades have long marked global events, such as the Panama–Pacific International Exposition, the Preparedness Day Bombing of 1916, the parade of the influenza-masked revelers of the first Armistice Day, the 1934 general strike that paralyzed the ports of the Pacific Coast, and the end of World War II. In the days of the first United Nations conferences, Anthony Eden, Vyacheslav Molotov, Edward Stettinius, and Georges Bidault rode up Market Street, waving to the crowds of hopefuls.

On Christmas Eve 1910, opera singer Luisa Tetrazzini sang a free outdoor concert to a crowd some estimated at 250,000, following a dispute with Oscar Hammerstein. Another historic Market Street event was the New Year's Eve celebration at the Ferry Building on December 31, 1999. Over 1.2 million people jammed Market Street and nearby streets for the raucous and peaceful turn-of-the-century celebration.

The San Francisco Pride parade runs down Market Street, attracting many people every year.

Victory parades celebrating the San Francisco Giants' World Series titles were held on Market Street in 2010, 2012, and 2014.

== See also ==
- A Trip Down Market Street, 1906 phantom ride film of a cable car traveling down the street
