= 1893 in rail transport =

This article lists events related to rail transport that occurred in 1893.

== Events ==
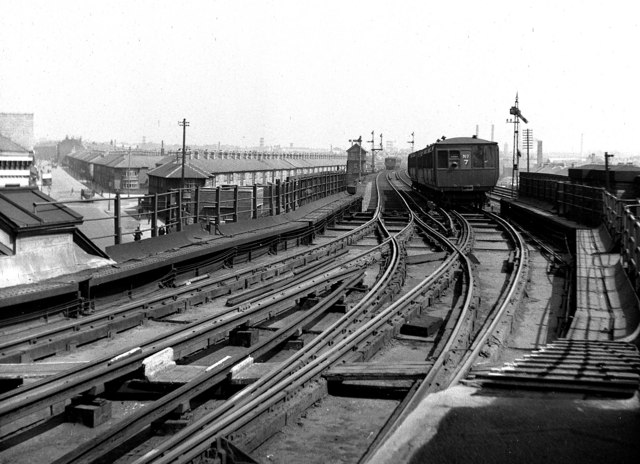
Liverpool Overhead

=== January events ===
- January 1 – Coming into force of international convention on the transport of goods by rail in the principal contiguous states of Western Europe.
- January 2 – Introduction by Webb C. Ball of the General Railroad Timepiece Standards in North America, leading to significance of the railroad chronometer.
- January – Under the direction of James J. Hill the third transcontinental railway, Great Northern, in the United States is completed to the Pacific Northwest.

=== February events ===
- February 4 – Official opening of main section of Liverpool Overhead Railway, the first electrified suburban line in Britain, and the first (third rail) electrified overhead railway in the world.
- February 23 – Rudolf Diesel receives a patent for the diesel engine.

=== March events ===
- March 1 – The New York, New Haven and Hartford Railroad (the New Haven Railroad) leases the Old Colony Railroad.
- March 2 – The US Railroad Safety Appliance Act is enacted, mandating that all cars in interchange service be equipped with air brakes, automatic couplers and grab irons.

=== April events ===
- April 17 – Central Station opened in Chicago in anticipation for the upcoming World's Columbian Exposition.
- April 22 – The John Bull arrives in Chicago, Illinois, for the World's Columbian Exposition after traveling under its own power from Jersey City, New Jersey.

=== May events ===
- May 1 – The World's Columbian Exposition in Chicago's Jackson Park is opened to the public with the Intramural Railway, a 2.7-mile elevated third rail electric railroad system providing transportation throughout the fair grounds. A total of 72 motor and trailer coaches were assigned to the line all built by the Jackson and Sharp Company of Wilmington, Delaware.
- May 10 – New York Central locomotive number 999 pulls a passenger train between Batavia and Buffalo, New York, reaching 112.5 mph (181 km/h); this is the first time an American train breaks 100 mph (161 km/h).
- May 12 – Chicago's premier rapid transit line, the South Side Elevated Railway, is extended to the World's Columbian Exposition in Jackson Park.

=== June events ===
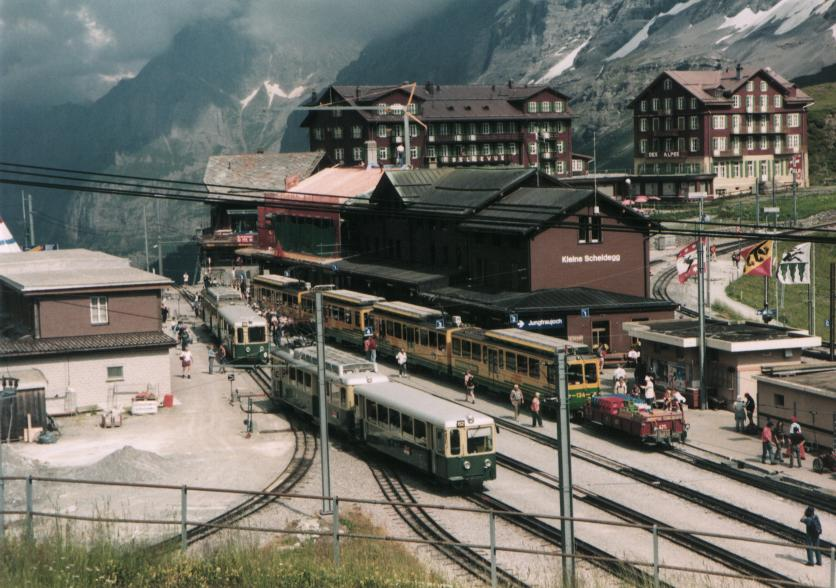
Wengernalpbahn

- June 20 – The Wengernalpbahn mountain railway in Wengen, Switzerland (Canton of Bern) is opened.
- June 22 – Robert S. Lovett succeeds Leland Stanford as the president of the Southern Pacific Company, parent company of the Southern Pacific Railroad, after Stanford's death. The Chairmanship position vacated by Stanford remains vacant for another 16 years.

=== July events ===
- July 1 – William Mackenzie purchases the Toronto and Mimico Creek Railway.
- July 10 – The Toronto and Mimico Creek Railway is extended to Mimico Creek.
- July 29 – Atchison, Topeka and Santa Fe Railway opens La Grande Station in Los Angeles.

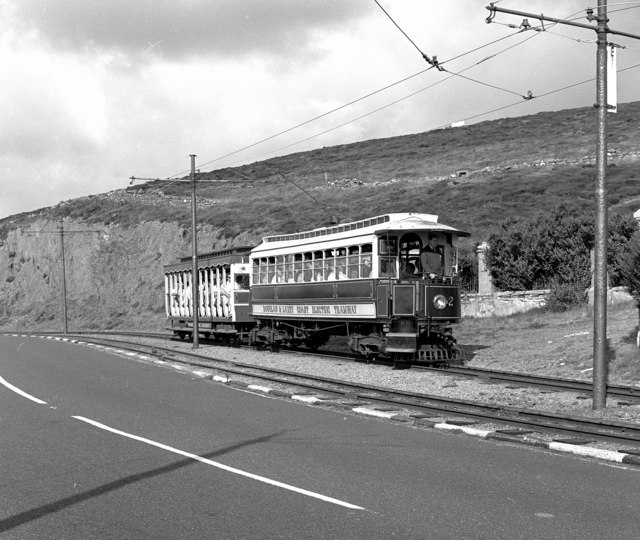
Manx Electric

=== August events ===
- August 12 – The Llantrisant rail accident in Wales kills 13 people.

=== September events ===
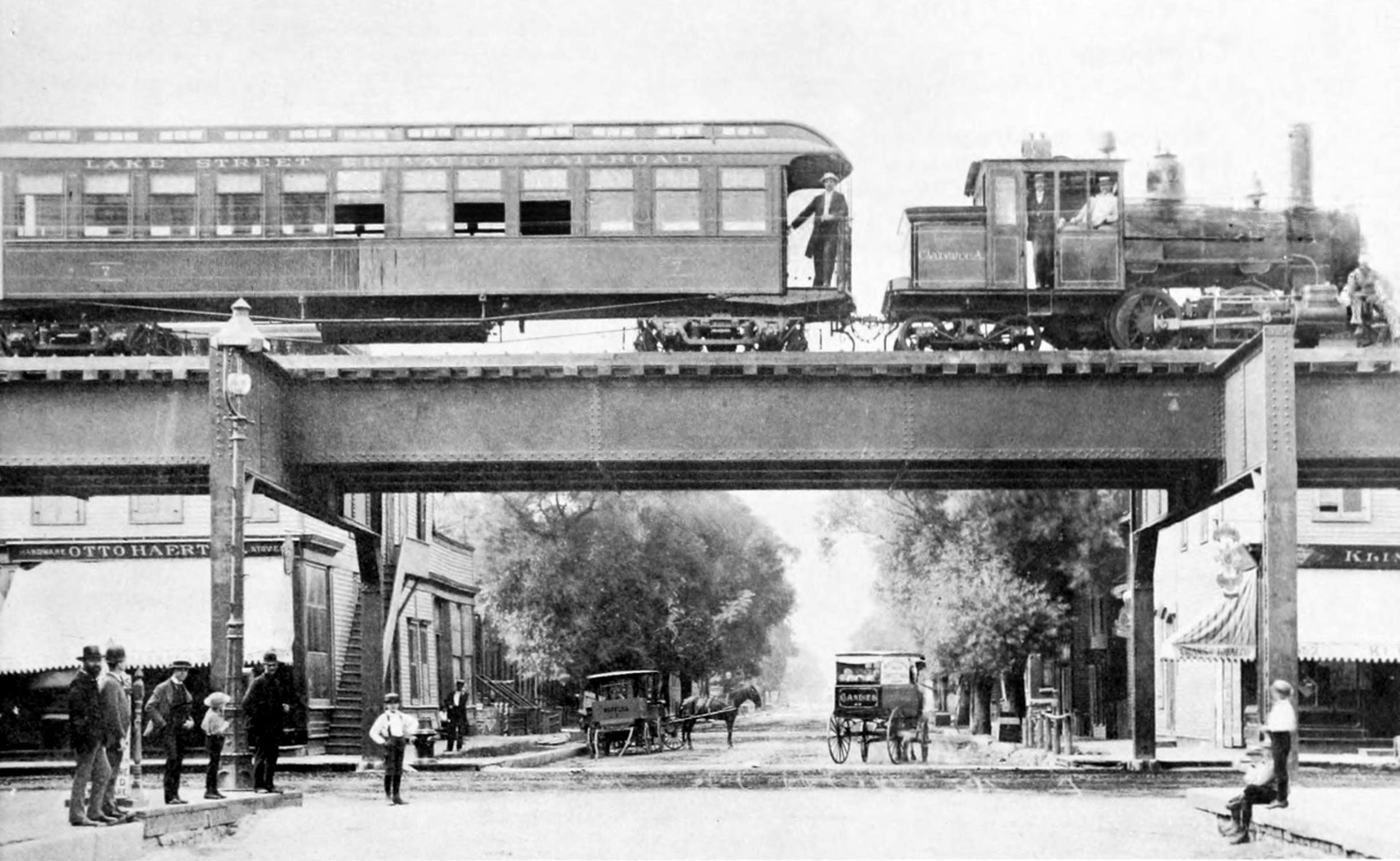
Lake Street Elevated

- September 7 – First part of Douglas & Laxey Coast Electric Tramway, a 3 ft (914 mm) gauge interurban (later the Manx Electric Railway), opens on the Isle of Man.
- September 18 – The Ottawa, Arnprior and Parry Sound Railway opens between Ottawa and Arnprior.

=== October events ===
- October 20 – Brayton Ives succeeds Thomas Fletcher Oakes as president of Northern Pacific Railway.

=== November events ===
- November 6 – The Lake Street Elevated Railroad, Chicago's second rapid transit line, is opened for service between Madison & Wacker and California Avenue. The road originally used 35 0-4-4T Forney locomotives built by the Rhode Island Locomotive Works and 125 trailer coaches built by Gilbert Car Company and Pullman Car Company.

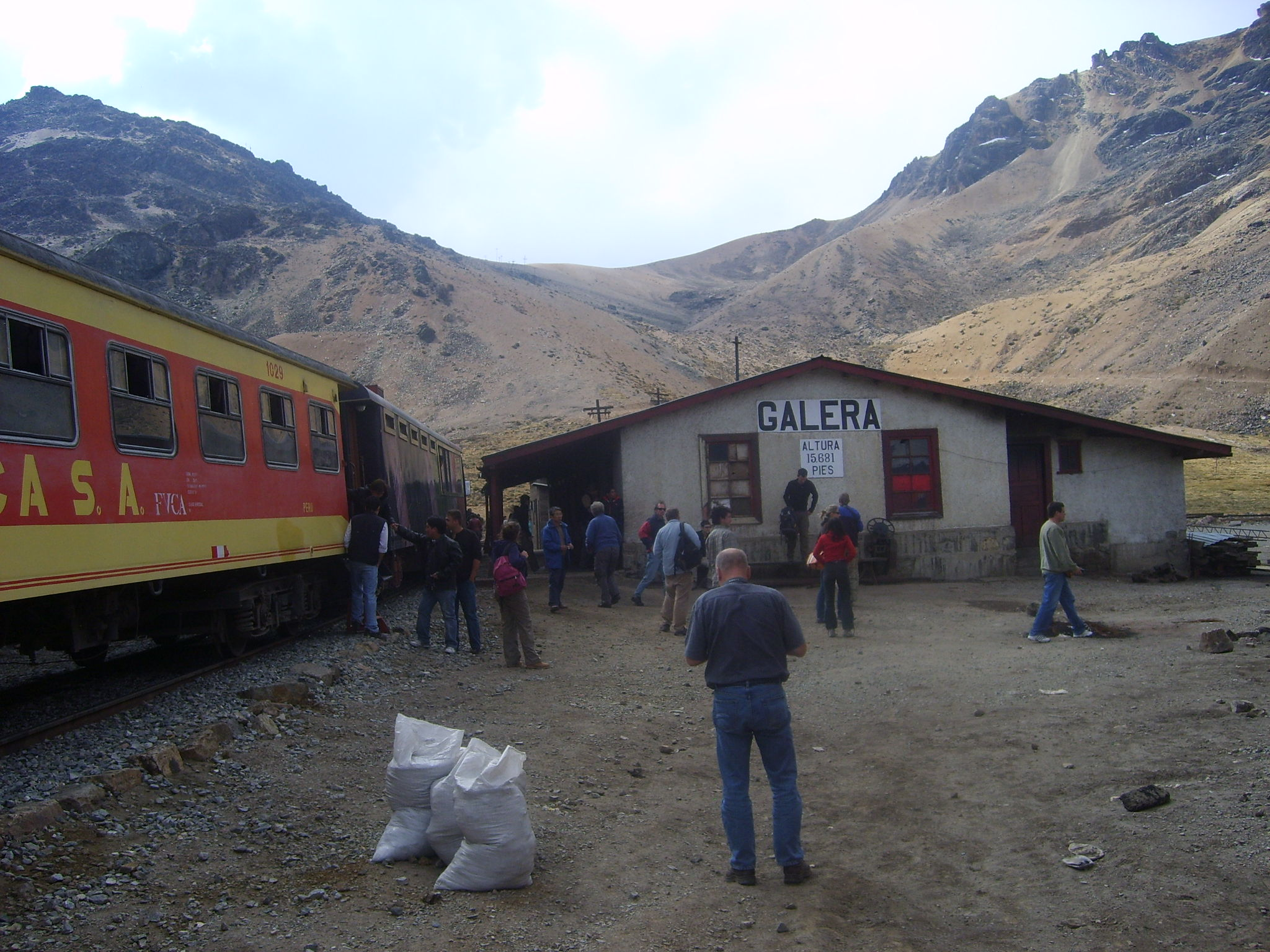
Galera railway station – world's highest in 1893

- November 14 – The Central Railway of Peru opens the section of line from Chicla across the Andes watershed to Oroya, with a summit level at Galera of 4781 m (15,686 feet) above sea level.

=== December events ===
- December 6 – The John Bull leaves the World Columbian Exposition in Chicago, Illinois, under its own power, headed toward Washington, DC, for its return to the Smithsonian Institution.
- December 18 – The Ottawa, Arnprior and Parry Sound Railway opens an extension of the railway from Arnprior to Eganville, Ontario.
- December 22 – The John Bull arrives back in Washington, DC, after traveling under its own power from Chicago, Illinois.
- December 23 – The Atchison, Topeka and Santa Fe Railway enters receivership three days after the railroad's chairman died.

=== Unknown date events ===
- Eugene V. Debs organizes the first industrial union in the United States, the American Railway Union (ARU).
- Jacob S. Rogers, son of company founder Thomas Rogers, resigns from the presidency of Rogers Locomotive and Machine Works; the company's former treasurer becomes president and reorganizes the company as Rogers Locomotive Company.
- Jewett Car Company is founded in Jewett, Ohio; it will become a major supplier of interurban cars and trolleys.

== Births ==
=== November births ===
- November 5 – Raymond Loewy, industrial designer who worked for the Pennsylvania Railroad designing the shape of equipment such as the GG1 (d. 1986).

== Deaths ==
=== January deaths ===
- January 27 – Alfred Belpaire, inventor of the Belpaire firebox for steam locomotives (b. 1820).

=== March deaths ===
- March 24 – John Taylor Johnston, president of the Central Railroad of New Jersey, 1848–1877 (b. 1820).

=== June deaths ===
- June 21 – Leland Stanford, a member of The Big Four group of financiers in California (b. 1824)

=== December deaths ===
- December 20 – George C. Magoun, Chairman of the Board of Directors for Atchison, Topeka and Santa Fe Railway in the late 1880s (b. 1840).

=== Unknown date deaths ===
- Allen Manvel, eleventh president of the Atchison, Topeka and Santa Fe Railway (b. 1837).
- Walter McQueen, Chief mechanical engineer for the Albany and Schenectady Railroad 1845–1850, Hudson River Railroad 1850–1852, and superintendent of Schenectady Locomotive Works 1852–1876 (b. 1817).
