= 1901 in rail transport =

This article lists events related to rail transport that occurred in 1901.

== Events ==
=== January events ===
- January 3 – The St. Louis Southwestern Railway purchases the Stuttgart and Arkansas River Railroad in Arkansas.

=== February events ===
- February – The Canadian Locomotive Company is formed from the assets of the bankrupt Canadian Locomotive and Engine Company.
- February 2 – The body of Queen Victoria is conveyed by the London & South Western, London, Brighton & South Coast and Great Western Railways from Gosport via London to Windsor, England for her funeral.

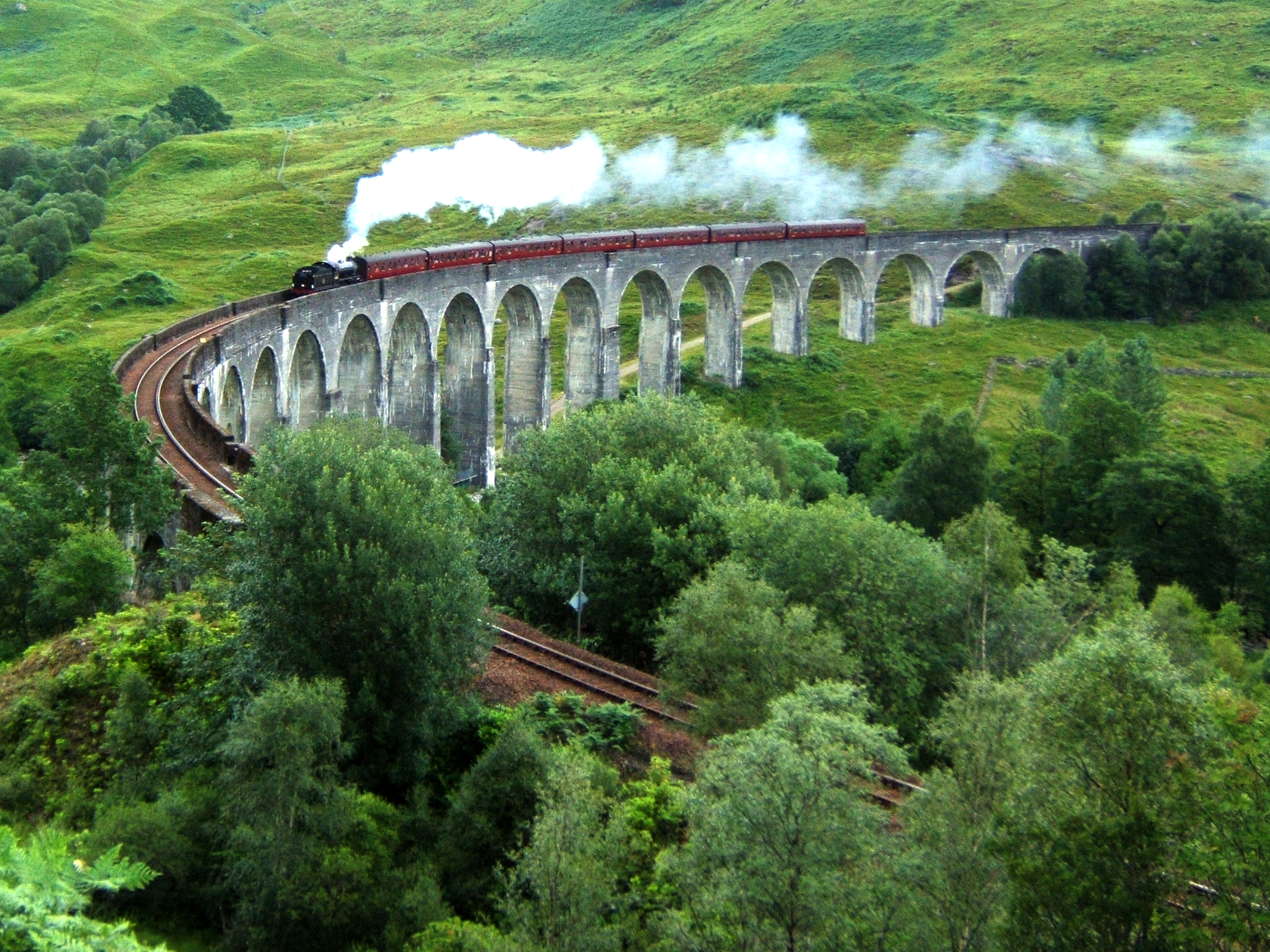
Glenfinnan Viaduct on the Mallaig Extension Railway

=== March events ===
- March 1 – First section of Wuppertal Schwebebahn suspension railway opens to the public.

=== April events ===
- April 1 – The West Highland Railway's Mallaig Extension Railway, operated by the North British Railway, is opened throughout to Mallaig on the west coast of Scotland.
- April 1 – Atlantic Coast Line Railroad acquires the Wilmington and Weldon Railroad in North Carolina.
- April 11 – The Ōu South Line in Japan opens between Yonezawa and Yamagata.

=== May events ===
- May
  - Frederick D. Underwood succeeds Eben B. Thomas as president of the Erie Railroad.
  - Gold Coast Government Railway opens from Sekondi on the coast to Tarkwa.
- May 27 – Sanyo Railroad Line, Kobe to Bakan (Shimonoseki Station renamed from June 1902) route officially completed in Japan (as predecessor of JR Sanyo Line).

=== June events ===
- June – First section of Gold Coast Railway (3 ft 6 in gauge) opens from Sekondi on the Gulf of Guinea to the gold mining district of Tarkwa.
- June 14 – The Atlantic City Railroad (predecessor of the Pennsylvania-Reading Seashore Lines) is incorporated from the merger of the Camden County Railroad, Ocean City Railroad and Seacoast Railroad.
- June 24 – The American Locomotive Company (ALCO) is formed through the merger of eight smaller American steam locomotive manufacturers.

=== July events ===
- July 25 – The Hull Electric Railway officially begins regular service over the Interprovincial Bridge between Ottawa and Aylmer, Quebec.

=== August events ===
- August 5 – Queenscliff Junction, in Victoria, Australia, is closed.

=== September events ===
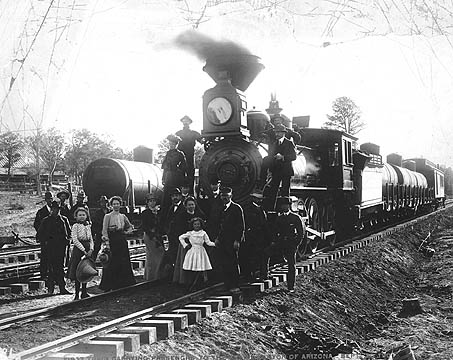
Passengers and crew gather for a group photo on the first run of the Grand Canyon Railway.

- September 17 – Atchison, Topeka and Santa Fe Railway (ATSF), having purchased the Santa Fe and Grand Canyon Railway and renamed it to the Grand Canyon Railway, begins to operate a passenger train service over its new subsidiary railroad between Williams, Arizona, and the south rim of the Grand Canyon as a destination for ATSF's customers.

=== October events ===
- October 8 – First experimental high-speed test of electric traction using three-phase power at 10 kV/50 Hz frequency on the Royal Prussian Military Railway.
- October 13 – The London and South Western Railway in England completes experimental installation at Grateley on its West of England main line of automatic semaphore signals controlled by track circuits and pneumatics, the first such scheme in the United Kingdom.

=== November events ===
- November – Official start of traffic on Chinese Eastern Railway.
- November 7 – Memphis, Helena and Louisiana Railroad, a predecessor of the St. Louis, Iron Mountain and Southern Railroad, is organized in Arkansas.
- November 12 – The Pacific Electric Railway is incorporated in California.

=== December events ===
- December 2 – The Chicago and Indiana Air Line Railway is incorporated.
- December 3 – The 3.5-kilometre (2.2 mi) first part of the Trondheim Tramway in Trondheim, Norway is opened.
- December 12 – Pennsylvania Railroad president Alexander Cassatt announces the railroad's plan to enter New York City – to tunnel under the Hudson River and to build a grand station on the West Side of Manhattan, a station that would become Pennsylvania Station.
- December 17 – The first section of the metre gauge Montreux–Oberland Bernois railway in Switzerland is opened from Montreux to Les Avants (10.9 km or 6.8 mi).
- December 21 – "Last spike" ceremony for the Uganda Railway (metre gauge), completed from Mombasa to Port Florence (Kisumu) on the shore of Lake Victoria.
- December 24 – The New Zealand Government Railways become the first major railway to place a 4-6-2 steam locomotive into service, having ordered thirteen Q class from the Baldwin Locomotive Works of Philadelphia.

=== Unknown date events ===
- E. H. Harriman succeeds Charles Melville Hays as president of the Southern Pacific Company, parent company of the Southern Pacific Railroad.
- Jacob S. Rogers, still the primary shareholder, closes Rogers Locomotive Company, but then reopens the company as Rogers Locomotive Works after the ALCO merger.
- American Car and Foundry (ACF) acquires Jackson and Sharp Company and Common Sense Bolster Company.
- George Frederick Baer becomes president of Reading Company.
- The Lake Shore Electric Railway is formed through the merger of the Lorain and Cleveland Railway, Sandusky and Interurban Railway and Toledo, Fremont and Norwalk Railway.

== Births ==
=== December births ===
- December 11 – Donald Gordon, president of Canadian National Railway 1950–1966, is born (died 1969).

== Deaths ==
=== January deaths ===
- January 6 – Philip Armour, founder of Armour and Company meatpackers and subsidiary Armour Refrigerator Line refrigerator car operators (born 1832).

=== February deaths ===
- February 9 – Fred Harvey (entrepreneur), who founded the Harvey House chain of restaurants and hotels to serve passengers of the Atchison, Topeka and Santa Fe Railway (born 1835).
- February 18 – Egide Walschaerts, Belgian inventor of a steam locomotive valve gear (born 1820).

=== April deaths ===
- April 13 – Edward Watkin, Chairman of several English railway companies, most notably the South Eastern Railway and the Great Central Railway (born 1819).

=== Unknown date deaths ===
- Jacob S. Rogers, son of Thomas Rogers and second president of Rogers Locomotive and Machine Works.
