= 1857 in rail transport =

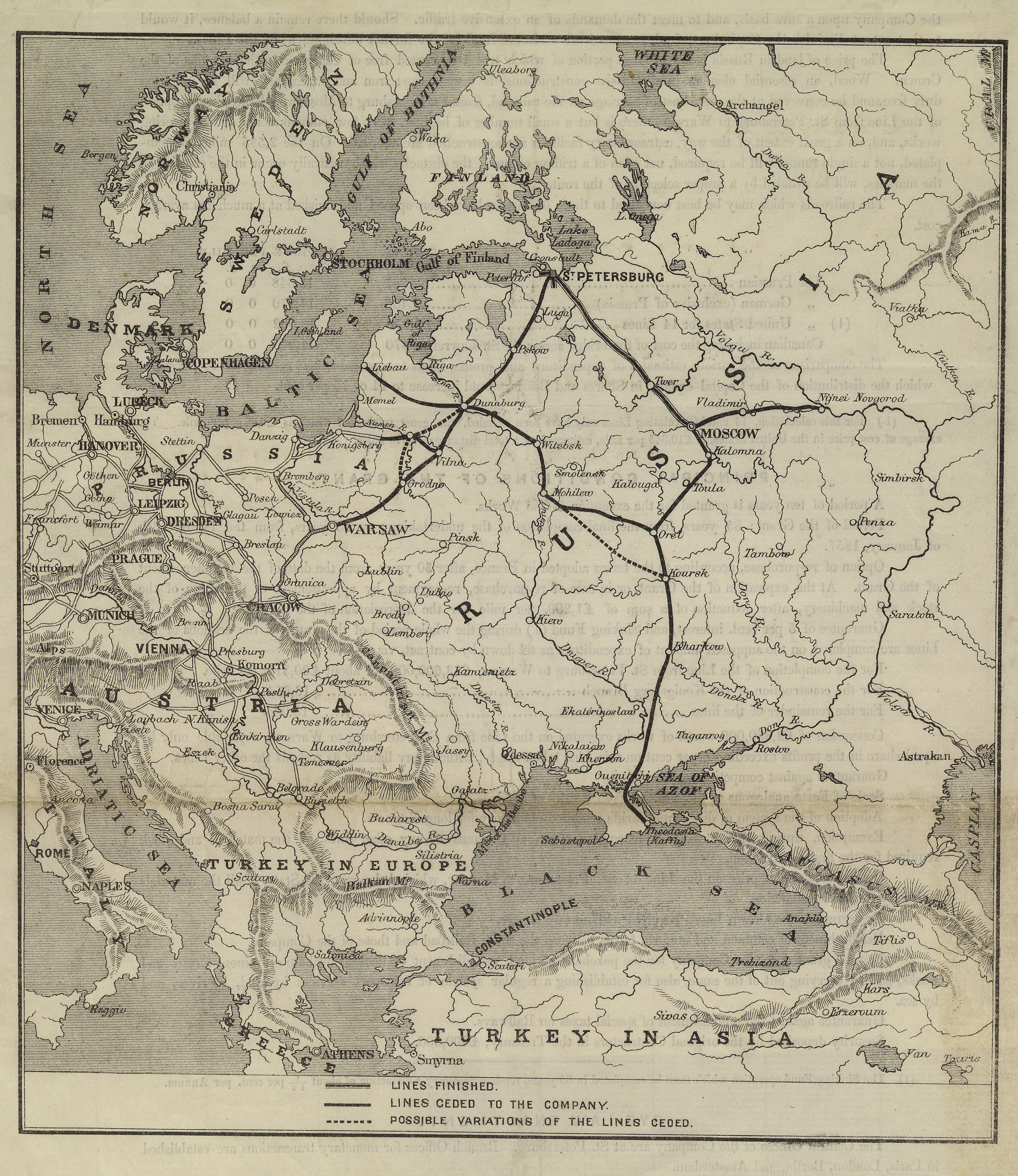
The Moscow to St Petersburg Railway, 1857

This article lists events related to rail transport that occurred in 1857.

== Events ==
=== January events ===
- January 13 – Thaddeus Fairbanks is awarded U.S. patent 16,381 for a railroad scale.

=== February events ===
- February 2 – With the approach of the Wilts, Somerset and Weymouth line of the Great Western Railway (GWR), the Bristol and Exeter Railway's Yeovil branch line is extended from Hendford across Yeovil to the GWR station at Pen Mill, coinciding with the GWR line from Frome to Yeovil.
- February 9 – The Central Pacific Railroad is incorporated in Nebraska Territory to build a railroad from the Missouri River through the Rocky Mountains to Washington Territory.
- February 18 – The Galena and Illinois River Railroad, a predecessor of the Pittsburgh, Cincinnati, Chicago and St. Louis Railroad, is incorporated in Illinois.

=== March events ===
- March 12 – Desjardins Canal disaster, Ontario, Canada: A faulty axle in a locomotive caused the derailment of a Great Western Railway train at the bridge over the Desjardins Canal and the subsequent collapse of the bridge.

=== April events ===
- April 11 – The Paris-Lyon-Méditerranée railway company (PLM) is formed in France by amalgamation of the Chemin de fer de Lyon à la Méditerranée (LM) and the Chemin de fer de Paris à Lyon (PL) companies.

=== May events ===
- May 7 – Formal opening of Midland Railway Leicester–Hitchin line, England.

=== June events ===
- June 1 – The Crumlin Viaduct is opened to the public in the UK
- June 4 – The first central connection to the Mississippi River is made when the Ohio and Mississippi Railroad connects Cincinnati, Ohio, to St. Louis, Missouri.
- June 11 – Norwegian railway director Carl Abraham Pihl is demanded by a Royal Decree to instruct a terrain investigation of the area along the river Drammenselva from Drammen to Randsfjorden.
- June 28 - The Lewisham rail crash (1857) in England kills 11 people.
- June 29 – The Cape Town Railway and Dock Company is granted approval to construct a 57-mile-long (92-kilometre) railway between Cape Town and Wellington.
- ca. June – Locomotion No. 1 is placed on display in Darlington, England, the first historic steam locomotive to be publicly preserved.

=== July events ===
- July 21 – Opening of Peterhof railway station in Saint Petersburg (Russia).

=== August events ===
- August 30 – Opening of first railway in Argentina, from Buenos Aires to the suburb of Floresta (10 km (6.2 mi) of 5 ft 6in (1676 mm) gauge).

=== October events ===
- October – Charles Moran succeeds Homer Ramdell as president of the Erie Railroad.
- October 12 – Completion of the Milan–Venice railway in Italy with opening of the section between Bergamo and Treviglio, following inauguration of the bridge over the Oglio at Palazzolo.

=== December events ===
- December 15 – George S. Griggs is awarded U.S. patent 18,883 for a steam locomotive fire arch developed by Matthew Baird.

=== Unknown date events ===
- Wrocław Główny railway station in Silesia is completed.
- Aretas Blood succeeds O. W. Bayley as superintendent of American steam locomotive builder Manchester Locomotive Works.
- Daniel Drew joins the board of directors for the Erie Railroad.
- Ginery Twichell becomes president of the Boston and Worcester Railroad in the United States.
- The first shipment of dressed beef by rail is sent from the Chicago Stockyards; the beef is packed in ice and shipped in conventional boxcars.
- The first rails made from steel are made by Robert Forester Mushet early in the year and laid experimentally at Derby railway station on the Midland Railway in England. The rails prove far more durable than the iron rails they replace and remain in use until 1873.

== Births ==
=== January births ===
- January 31 – George Jackson Churchward, Chief mechanical engineer of the Great Western Railway of England 1902–1922 (d. 1933).

=== November births ===
- November 17 – William Benson Storey, president of Atchison, Topeka and Santa Fe Railway 1920–1933 (d. 1940).

== Deaths ==
=== April deaths ===
- April 20 – George Hennet, English railway contractor (b. 1799).

=== May deaths ===
- May 8 – Jasper Grosvenor, American financier who partnered with Thomas Rogers and Morris Ketchum to form Rogers, Ketchum and Grosvenor (b. 1794).
