= Grant Locomotive Works =

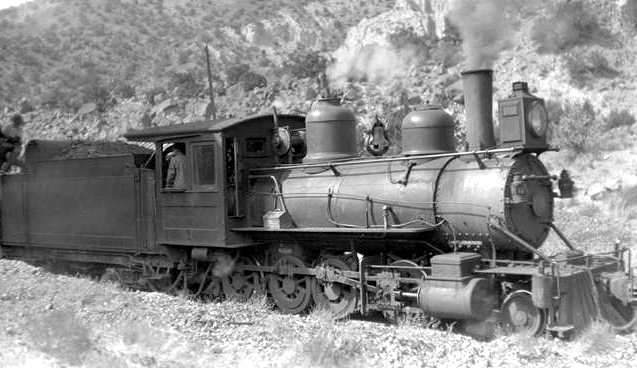
Denver and Rio Grande Western 220, at Embudo, NM, 1920

Grant Locomotive Works was an American manufacturer of steam railway locomotives from 1867 to 1895, first in Paterson, New Jersey, and then in Chicago. The company built about 1,888 locomotives.

== Predecessors ==
In 1842, Samuel Smith, Abram Collier, and George Bradley started a small foundry in Paterson. In 1848, Smith sold his interest to Collier and formed a new partnership with his brother, William C. Smith, Henry Whitely, and Thomas Beggs. Beggs died soon thereafter and William Smith and Whitely sold their interests. William Swinburne, who had been superintendent at Rogers Locomotive Works bought Beggs's interest. The firm was renamed Swinburne, Smith and Company. In 1848, it took an order for ten locomotives for the New York and Erie Railroad; three years later, it received a corporate charter as New Jersey Locomotive and Machine Company.

In 1863-64, Oliver De Forest Grant bought the stock and ran the business with his sons, David B. Grant and R. Suydam Grant. The father died shortly thereafter and David Grant took over as president.

== Consolidation locomotive ==
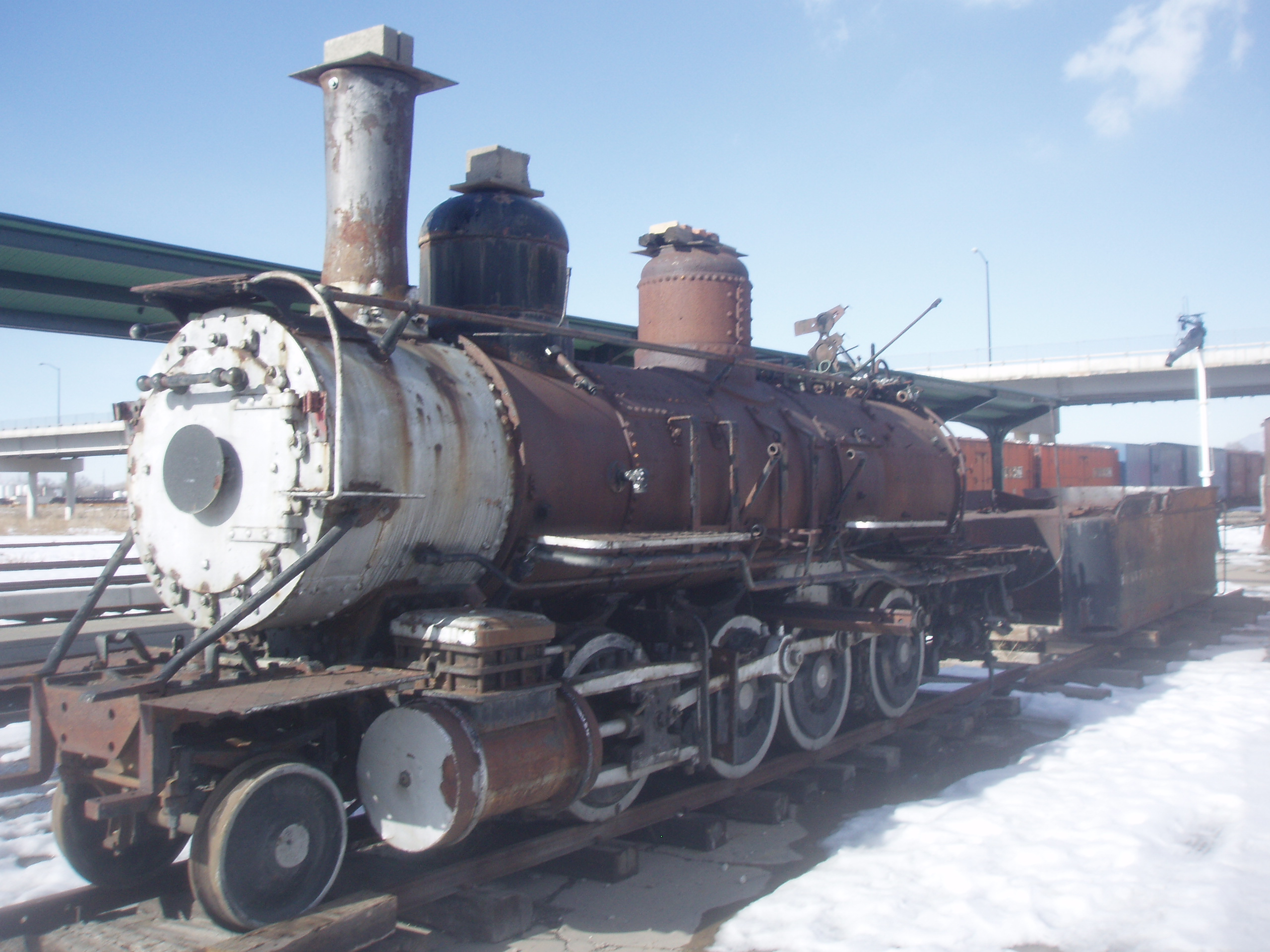
D&RGW 223 awaiting restoration in 2010.

The namesake of the 2-8-0 Consolidation type was designed in 1866 by Alexander Mitchell, Master Mechanic of the Mahanoy Division of the Lehigh Valley Railroad. Baldwin Locomotive Works was asked to build it, but was reluctant; Rogers Locomotive Works declined. Grant submitted a bid of $19,500, but ultimately the contract went to Baldwin. Fifteen years later, in 1881, the Baldwin Locomotive Works was unable to fill an order of Consolidations from the Denver & Rio Grande Western Railroad, and part of the contract went to Grant to build that railroad's C-16-60N (better known as C-16)-class locomotives. One of the two surviving Grant-built locomotives, D&RGW 223, was built to this Consolidation design.

== Financial troubles ==
In 1867, the business was granted a New Jersey corporate charter as Grant Locomotive Works. The business muddled along, "rarely enjoying continuing financial success". The company's boilermakers struck for higher wages in 1872; Grant locked them out and eventually replaced them for less money. In 1874, the Russian Empire ordered 55 Consolidations, but difficulties arose and ultimately the Russians canceled 20 of the order.

Grant retired on January 1, 1880, and was succeeded by William W. Evans, who had been chief accountant since 1866. Two years later, the company had 720 men on the payroll. In 1881, the company completed 110 engines. In 1882, the company owned 157,000 square feet (14,600 m^{2}) of manufacturing and office space in nine buildings, of which it occupied 126,665 square feet (11,767.6 m^{2}). In 1887, the company lost half of its buildings in a fire.

== Chicago ==
A group of Chicago businessmen convinced the company to move there. They spent more than a million dollars on buildings and installed largely new machinery, bringing only certain patterns from Paterson. The company built only 24 engines in Chicago before a strike and the Panic of 1893 forced it into receivership, from which it did not recover.

== Production ==
The company built locomotives for at least 134 domestic railroads, including:

- Baltimore and Ohio
- Boston and Maine
- Chateaugay R.R.
- Central Pacific
- Chesapeake & Ohio
- Chicago & Alton Railroad
- Chicago and North Western Railway
- Chicago, Burlington & Quincy
- Chicago, Milwaukee & St. Paul
- Chicago, Rock Island & Pacific
- Delaware, Lackawanna & Western
- Denver & Rio Grande
- Erie Railway
- Grand Trunk Western
- Great Northern
- Lehigh Valley
- Michigan Central
- Missouri, Kansas & Texas
- New York & New Haven
- Norfolk & Western
- Northern Pacific
- Pennsylvania
- Richmond, Fredericksburg & Potomac
- Seaboard Airline
- Texas & St. Louis Ry.
- Toledo, Cincinnati and St. Louis Railroad
- Union Pacific
- Utah Northern
- Western Maryland

Until the early 1870s, these were largely Americans (4-4-0s), with a few six-wheel switchers (0-6-0s), Moguls (2-6-0s), and Ten Wheelers (4-6-0)s. In 1865, the firm built 22 eight-wheel switchers (0-8-0s) for the B&O. The order for the Russian government was apparently the firm's first 2-8-0s. In 1878, it built 35 Columbias (2-4-2s) for the Manhattan elevated railway. From 1878 to 1882, it built 96 Consolidations for the New York, Lake Erie & Western. Their first three-foot-gauge order came from the Utah Northern, a narrow-gauge line that ran from Ogden, Utah, to Butte, Montana. These locomotives, of the 2-4-0 type, were delivered in 1871. In 1881, the Denver and Rio Grande ordered 30 narrow-gauge Consolidations of the 60N (later C-16) class. Their next narrow-gauge order was 20 engines for the Toledo, Cincinnati & St. Louis R.R., which defaulted on payment. Grant was forced to sell them at a large loss that weakened the company's finances. In 1887, shortly before the fire destroyed much of their factory the company secured a single order (works no. 1713 according to the Best list ) for a 2-6-2 "Prairie" tank locomotive for the Chinese Engineering & Mining Company's Kaiping colliery at Tangshan, N.E. China. This was allocated the mine's road No.4. The locomotive's wheel arrangement and other specifications broadly matched two similar batches of British locomotives ordered at the same time from the Dubs and the Sharp Stewart locomotive works respectively, both based in Glasgow, Scotland. A photograph of this engine has survived
