= Bissel truck =

Single-axle bogie which pivots towards the centre of a steam locomotive

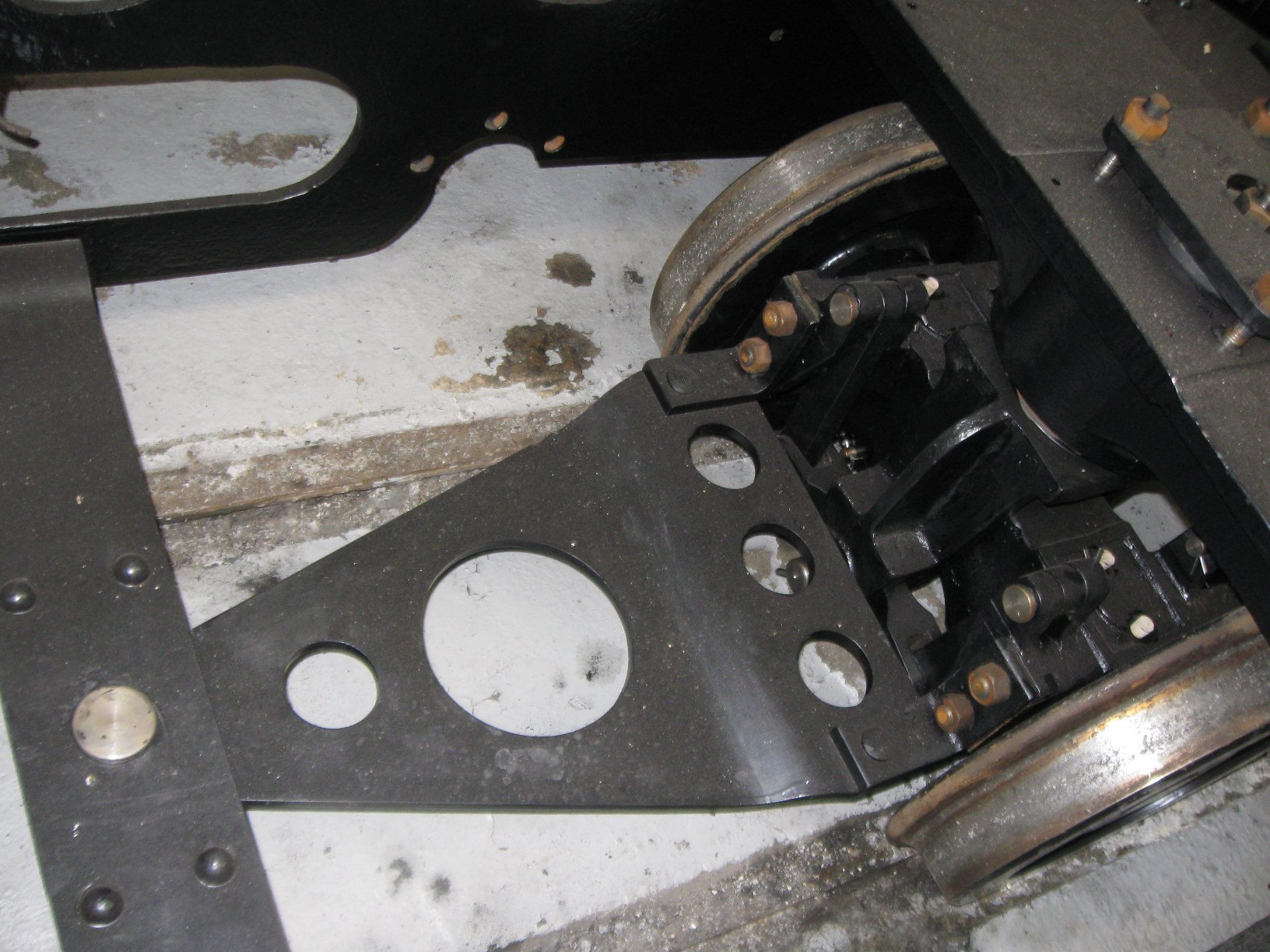
Rear Bissel truck on the narrow gauge locomotive Russell

A Bissell or Bissel truck (also Bissel bogie or pony truck) is a single-axle bogie which pivots towards the centre of a steam locomotive to enable it to negotiate curves more easily. Invented in 1857 by Levi Bissell and usually then known as a pony truck, it is a very simple and common means of designing a carrying wheel.

== Name variants ==
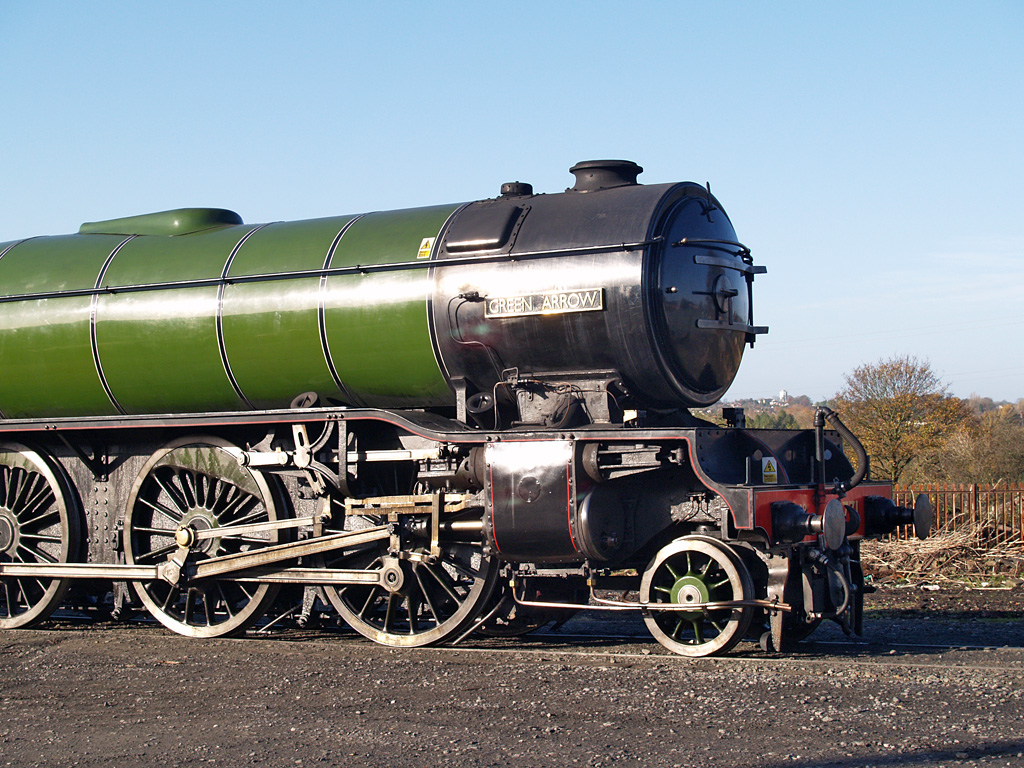
LNER Class V2 4771 Green Arrow showing pony truck in front of cylinders and driving wheels

A pony truck in railway terminology, is a leading truck with only two wheels. Its invention is generally credited to Bissell, who devised one in 1857 and patented it the following year. Hence the term Bissel bogie, Bissel truck, or Bissel axle is used in continental Europe. In the UK, the term is Bissell truck.

Conservative locomotive builders in Bissell's native United States did not take to the new design, and it was not implemented until after the Eastern Counties Railway in the United Kingdom fitted one to their No. 248 in 1859. Pony trucks of similar design became very popular on British locomotives thereafter.

== Properties and use ==
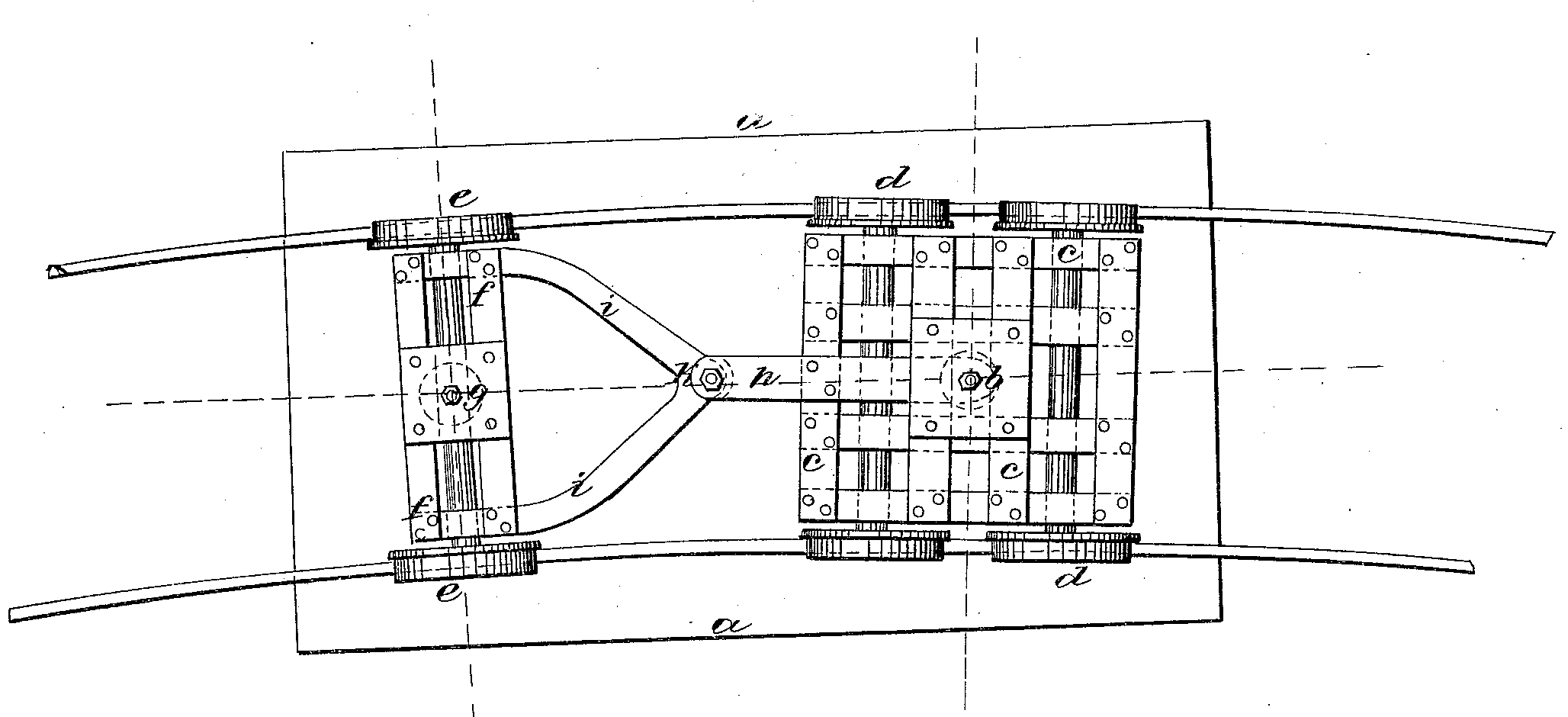
Drawing from Patent US62727

A locomotive with a Bissell axle is able to both turn about its vertical axis and swing radially to the side, movements advantageous to steam locomotives because their position on the track is dictated by the driving or coupled wheels. The Bissel truck also helps stabilize a train in a turn, where centrifugal force causes a locomotive to lean away from the track. It features a pair of inclined planes which mate with an opposing set on the engine's frame where the two join. The more a truck moves to the side, the greater the lift to the outside of the locomotive, canting it slightly into the curve. Though the system was effective, casting and machining its sloping surfaces was expensive.

A refinement, the Hudson-Bissell truck, delivered the same result using less costly components. Instead of resting upon opposing planes, the engine frame is joined to the truck by two swing links. As the truck pivots sideways the outside of the locomotive is elevated, a practical modification used right to the end of the steam era.

=== Equalizing ===
Partly because load was not equalized between the Bissell pony truck and the leading drivers, the pony truck did not become instantly popular in the US. Locomotives in the UK were generally not equalized, so it was not considered a problem there. John P. Laird was the first to attempt to equalize the pony truck with the drivers in 1857; he received a patent on the concept in 1866. Laird's design was complex and did not find favor, although he incorporated it on some locomotives he built or rebuilt, particularly on the Marietta and Cincinnati Railroad and later the Pennsylvania Railroad.

John H. Whetstone of Cincinnati, working for Niles and Company, was the next to devise a method for equalizing; in this scheme, the truck frame was itself the equalizing beam as well. Niles went bankrupt before the patent was granted, and no locomotive was ever fitted with this design.

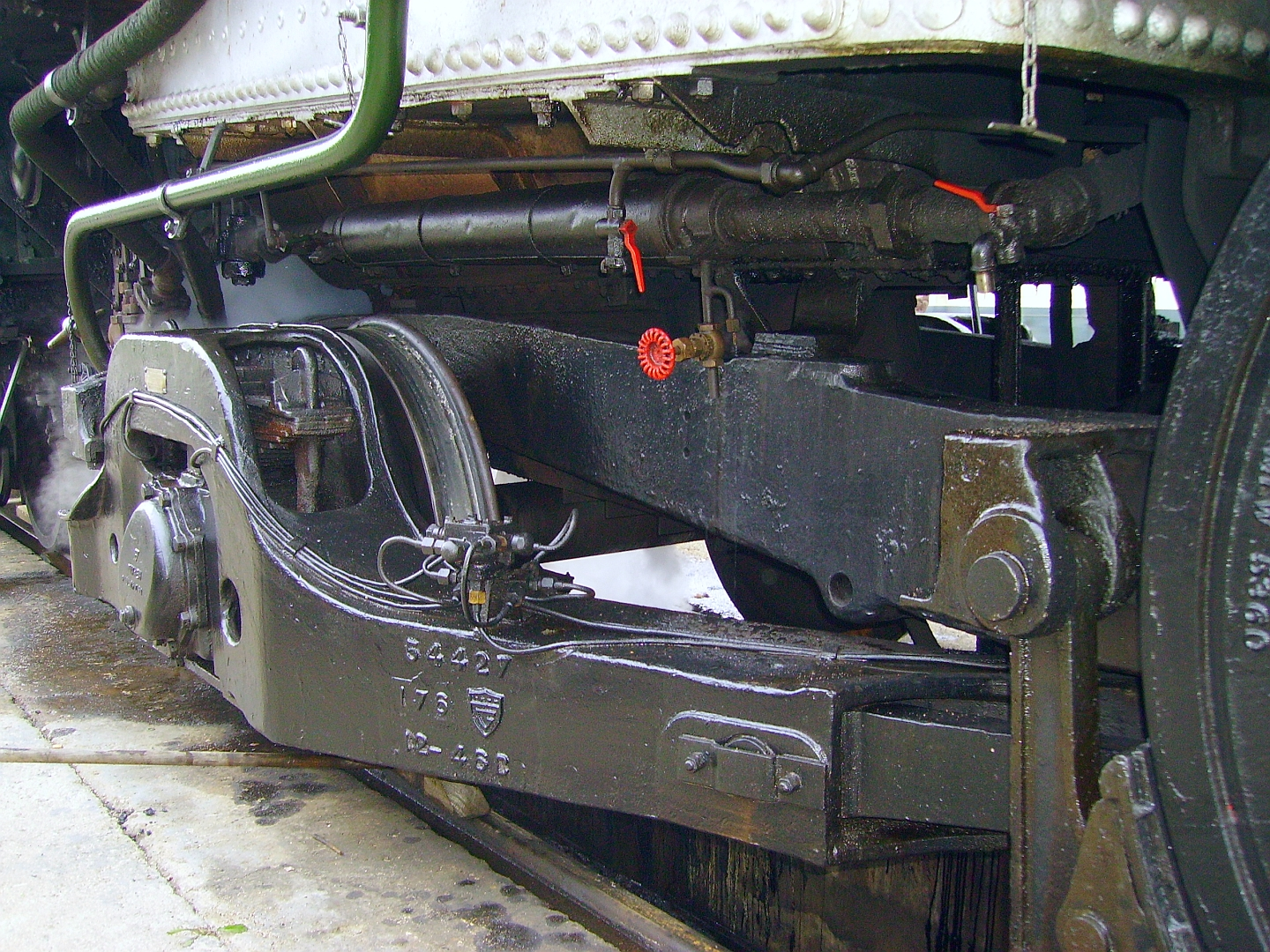
Guide frame of a Bissel truck on French SNCF Class 141R1199 2-8-2 steam locomotive

A more successful scheme for equalizing the pony truck to the drivers was invented by William S. Hudson, superintendent of the Rogers Locomotive and Machine Works, and patented in 1864. In this design, a large equalizing lever linked the front truck with a transverse bar connected to the front spring hangers of the driving wheels. This design was an immediate success and was used on American-built locomotives until the end of steam building.

== Terminology ==
In the US, these trucks were known as lead trucks. A pony truck was the lead truck on a horse drawn rail car or trolley. A pony truck required a hitch to attach horses. The term, when applied to US steam locomotives after 1900, is considered archaic. Pony trucks are not quite analogous to an articulated locomotive.

The pony truck can move radially around a real or virtual pivot. When the pivot is situated at a point inside the truck, the truck is called a bogie. What makes it a Bissel bogie is the pivot being placed outside to the rear or fore.

== Examples ==
Examples of steam engines fitted with Bissell trucks include the German DRG Class 64 and Class 99.73-76 locomotives. Some older electric locomotives have Bissell trucks, if the driving axles are located in the main frame rather than the now usual bogies.

A British example was the London and North Western Railway 0-4-2 tank locomotive which was known as a "Bissell tank" or "Bissell truck tank". It was also used on the South African Class 4E electric and Class 32-000 and 32-200 diesel-electric locomotives.

== See also ==
- South African Class 32-000
- 1Co+Co1 diesel-electric locomotive
