= Philo C. Calhoun =

American politician

President of the Fourth National Bank of New York
- In office 1865–1882
- Preceded by: Morris Ketchum
- Succeeded by: O. D. Baldwin

Member of the Connecticut State Senate for the 10th District
- In office 1859

Mayor of Bridgeport, Connecticut
- In office 1855–1858
- Preceded by: John Brooks, Jr.
- Succeeded by: Silas C. Booth

Personal details
- Born: Philo Clark Calhoun; December 4, 1810 Danbury, Connecticut, U.S.
- Died: March 21, 1882 (aged 71) Manhattan, New York, U.S.
- Party: Democrat
- Spouse: Sarah Caroline Sterling

Philo Clark Calhoun (December 4, 1810 – March 21, 1882) was an American industrialist, banker, and politician who served as president of the Fourth National Bank of New York.

== Early life ==
Calhoun was born on December 4, 1810, in Danbury, Connecticut, and reportedly "began life in poverty." He was the youngest of three, and only boy, born to Philo Calhoun (1776–1850) and Sally J. (née McLean) Calhoun (1778–1828). His older sisters were Mary Jane "Molly" and Nancy Calhoun.

His paternal grandparents were the former Tabitha Clark and Dr. John Calhoun of Washington, Connecticut, a member of the Committee of Inspection in 1775 and a member of the Connecticut Legislature in 1782.

== Career ==
When he was sixteen years old, he went to Bridgeport, Connecticut, to become an apprentice with Lyon, Wright & Co., a saddle and harness business. After he finished his term of service, his employer sent him to Charleston, South Carolina, as assistant manager of the firm there. The warm climate of Charleston restored his poor health and he returned to Bridgeport in 1834 with "a vigorous constitution and the full confidence of his firm." He purchased a minority interest in the business and managed the firm's factory. In 1838, the firm name was changed to Lyon, Calhoun & Co. After Lyon's retirement from the business, his interest was purchased by Henry K. Harral, the mayor of Bridgeport and the firm name was changed to Harral, Calhoun & Co. although Calhoun essentially ran the entire business. He established branch houses in Charleston, St. Louis, Cincinnati and New York.

In 1875, upon the dissolution of Hoover, Calhoun & Co., he established the Peters and Calhoun Manufacturing Company, a stock company for the manufacture of saddlery in Newark, New Jersey, in which he was the controlling owner with an office at 691 Broadway in New York. He also served as a director of the Farragut Fire Insurance Co., treasurer of the Central Coal Co., and trustee of the mortgagees of several railroad companies.

=== Political career ===
In 1845, he was elected to the Common Council of Bridgeport, holding office for five years. In 1852, he became Alderman and in 1855, he himself was elected mayor of Bridgeport by a heavy majority, serving as the Democratic mayor until 1858. While mayor, he "gave Bridgeport has and planned its water supply." He later represented Bridgeport in the Connecticut House of Representatives followed by the Connecticut Senate. He served until the beginning of the U.S. Civil War when he found himself "at variance with the Democratic Party, by which he had been so long honored, and yet unwilling to desert it for the Republicans, with which he was more in sympathy, he turned more closely than ever to his business, and never again held office."

=== Banking career ===
In 1847, he became president of the Connecticut National Bank of Bridgeport. He remained president of that bank until January 1864 when the Fourth National Bank of New York was formed and he was made vice president.

Following the failure of Morris Ketchum & Son in 1864 and the discovery of a vast embezzlement scheme by the son of Fourth National Bank of New York president Morris Ketchum, Calhoun was asked to take over as president of the Bank when "the Directors of the bank and several of its largest stockholders went to Bridgeport and urged him to accept the position, and, at great personal sacrifice, he acceded to their request." He served as president of the Bank during the Panic of 1873 and until his death in 1882. While he was president, the deposits of the bank quadrupled and it became "one of the largest deposit banks in the country."

== Personal life ==
Calhoun was married to Sarah Caroline Sterling (1820–1894), a daughter of Jesse Sterling and Sarah (née Gregory) Sterling. Together, they were the parents of:

- Louise Caroline Calhoun (1838–1916), who married George Woodside Latham (1833–1870) of Lynchburg, Virginia, in 1860.
- Edward Sterling Calhoun (b. 1840), who married Alice Hersey (1845–1944) of Taunton, Massachusetts.
- Julia Ellsworth Calhoun, who married William Briggs Cragin of Rye, New York.
- Charles Morrell Calhoun (1848–1916), who married Julia Sanford (1861–1918).
- Mary Sterling Calhoun (1851–1910), who married James Stranaham Burke (1853–1913) in 1882.

Calhoun was a member of the Union League Club and the Union Club, both of New York.

After a weeks illness, Calhoun died of pneumonia at 152 Madison Avenue, his residence in New York City, on March 21, 1882. After a funeral held at St. Thomas' Protestant Episcopal Church in New York officiated by the Rev. William F. Morgan, he was buried at Mountain Grove Cemetery in Bridgeport. His widow died on May 15, 1894.
