= Robert S. Hughes =

American businessman

Robert S. Hughes (died 1900) was the third president of Rogers Locomotive and Machine Works. Before becoming president when Jacob S. Rogers resigned in 1893, he served as the company's treasurer. When Hughes took the reins at Rogers he led the company through a reorganization to emerge as Rogers Locomotive Company; Hughes remained the company president until his death in 1900.

The 1859 directory of Paterson, New Jersey, lists Hughes as a bookkeeper living in a single house at 28 Smith.
