= John Cooke (entrepreneur) =

- Born: 1824; Montreal, Quebec, Canada
- Died: 1882 (aged 57–58); Paterson, New Jersey, United States
- Occupation: locomotive manufacturing

John Cooke (1824–1882) was one of the principals of Cooke Locomotive Works, one of the constituent companies that made up American Locomotive Company in the merger of 1901.

Cooke was born in Montreal, Quebec, Canada, but sought his fortune in the United States. While a teenager, he was apprenticed to Thomas Rogers (who founded the Rogers Locomotive and Machine Works). His apprenticeship worked out so well for the two of them that he was promoted to shop superintendent by 1843, a position he held until 1852.

When he left Rogers' employ, Cooke formed a partnership with Charles Danforth. The two founded the new locomotive manufacturing company of Danforth, Cooke and Company in Paterson, New Jersey. Cooke's company became a serious competitor in the locomotive building business. After Cooke's death in 1882, his company, by that time renamed to Cooke Locomotive Works, became one of the constituent companies that made up the American Locomotive Company in the merger of 1901.
