= Fourth National Bank of New York =

The Fourth National Bank of the City of New-York
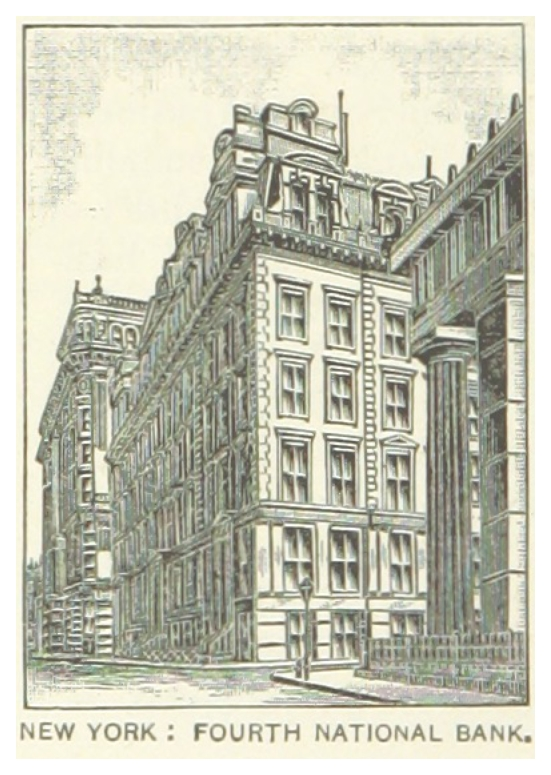
- Industry: Banking
- Founded: January 1864
- Defunct: May 1914
- Fate: Merged with Mechanics and Metals National Bank
- Successor: Chase National Bank
- Headquarters: 29 Pine Street, New York City, New York, United States
- Area served: New York
- Key people: George Opdyke, Morris Ketchum, J. Edward Simmons
- Products: Financial services

The Fourth National Bank of New York was an American bank based in New York City.

== History ==
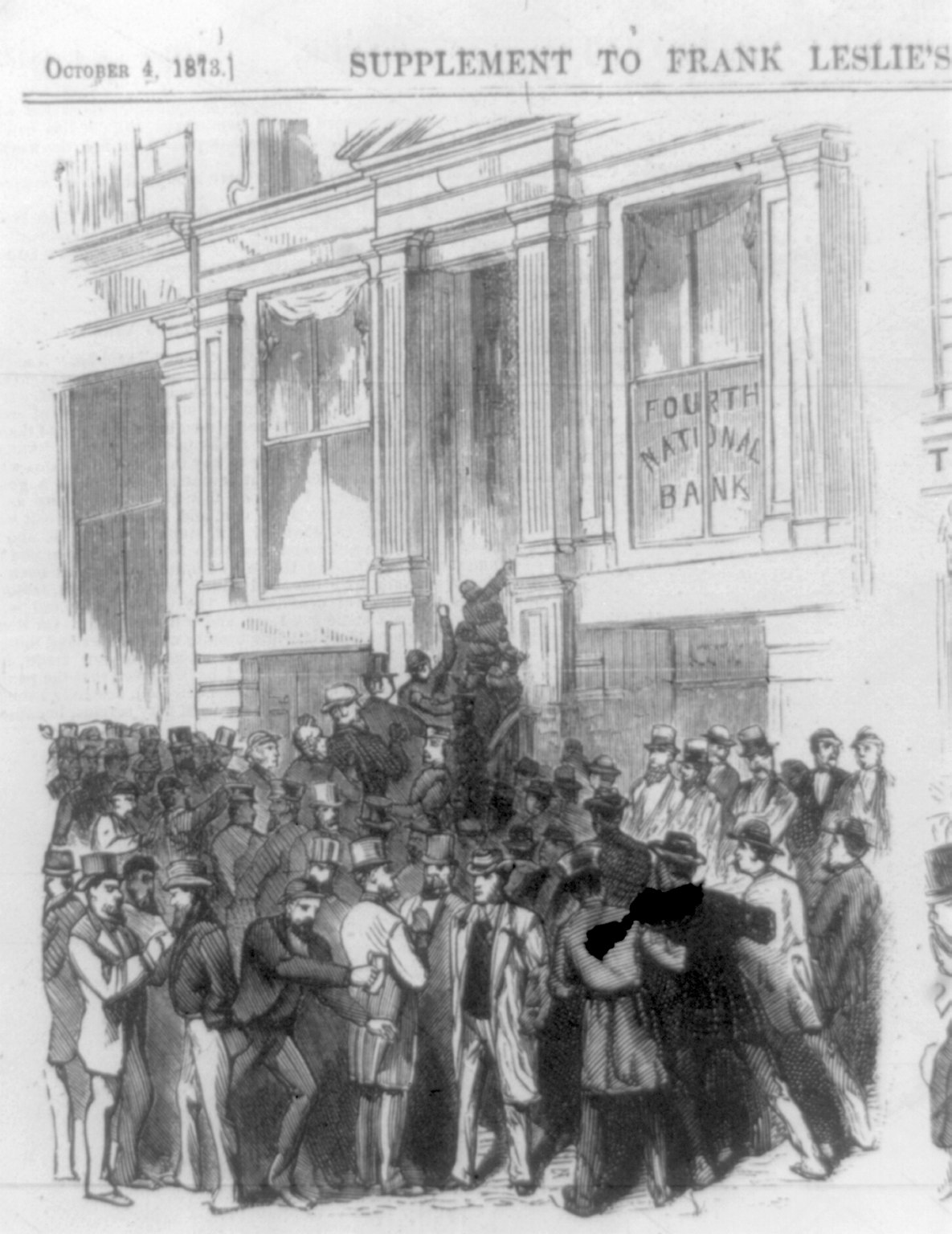
"The Panic - Run on the Fourth National Bank, No. 20 Nassau Street"

The Fourth National Bank of New York was organized in January 1864. At the time of its organization, many, including Secretary of the Treasury Salmon P. Chase, thought that "a bank of large capital should be organized under such favorable auspices as would result in demonstrating the utility of the National Banking System, and would induce banks existing under the State system to take out charters under the National Banking Act." The Fourth National Bank was founded by many of New York's most eminent citizens, including Jay Cooke.

The bank first opened its doors in the "old Government building" at 29 Pine Street. In 1866, however, the bank moved to a six-story white-marble building located at the northeast corner of Nassau and Pine Streets.

In 1893, the capital stock of the bank was $3,200,000; a surplus of $1,350,000; it had net profits of $378,030; and average net deposits of $20,000,000.

In August 1911, interests identified with the Fourth National Bank, took over the Fourteenth Street Bank, which then changed its name to the Security Bank. A few weeks later, the new Security Bank merged with the Nineteenth and Twelfth Ward Banks. In response to the takeover, Cannon testified before Samuel Untermyer during the Pujo Committee money trust hearings in 1911.

=== 1914 Merger ===
In May 1914, the directors of the Fourth National Bank and the Mechanics and Metals National Bank agreed to unite. The Mechanics and Metals National Bank was the result of a 1910 merger between Mechanics National Bank (which was founded in 1810) and the National Copper Bank (which was established in 1907). The Mechanics and Metals Bank offered $200 a share for the stock and the resultant bank had net deposits of approximately $90,000,000. In March 1914 immediately before the merger, the Mechanics and Metals had net deposits of $58,433,000 and Fourth National had net deposits of $33,408,000.

After a number of mergers and acquisitions (including with the Produce Exchange Union in 1920), the Mechanics and Metals National Bank consolidated with the Chase National Bank in 1926.

== Leadership ==
The first president of the bank was George Opdyke, who had served as mayor of New York City from 1862 to 1863 and whose term in office had just expired before assuming the presidency. The prominent financier Morris Ketchum was Opdyke's successor. The third president was Philo C. Calhoun, a former mayor of Bridgeport, who served over a period of roughly fifteen years. After Calhoun died in 1882, O. D. Baldwin was chosen to fill the presidency. He resigned in January 1888 and was succeeded by J. Edward Simmons, a former president of the New York Stock Exchange. After Simmons' death in 1910, he was succeeded by the bank's vice-president, James Graham Cannon (brother of Henry W. Cannon).

=== List of presidents ===
- George Opdyke (1864–1864)
- Morris Ketchum (1864–1865)
- Philo C. Calhoun (1865–1882)
- O. D. Baldwin (1882–1888)
- J. Edward Simmons (1888–1910)
- James G. Cannon (1910–1914)
