= Illinois Central 201 =

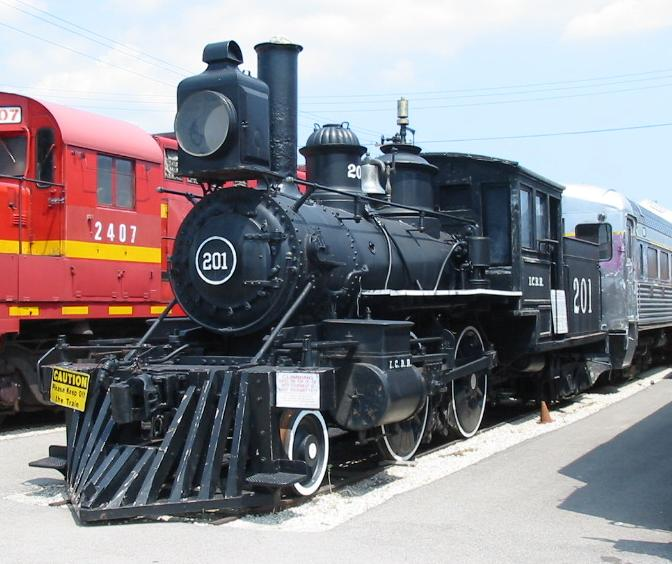
- IC 201 at the Illinois Railway Museum
Type and origin
- Power type: Steam
- Builder: Rogers Locomotive and Machine Works
- Serial number: 2588
- Build date: May 1880
Specifications
- Configuration
  - Whyte: 2-4-4RT
  - UIC: 1′B2′ nt
- Gauge: 4 ft 8 1/2 in (1,435 mm) standard gauge
- Driver dia.: 56 1/2 in (1,435 mm)
- Loco weight: 107,600 lb (48,806.5 kg; 48.8 t)
- Fuel type: Coal
- Boiler pressure: 140 lbf/in^{2} (970 kPa)
- Cylinders: Two, outside
- Cylinder size: 16 in × 22 in (406 mm × 559 mm)
- Valve gear: Walschaerts
- Valve type: Slide valve
- Loco brake: Air
- Train brakes: Air
- Couplers: Knuckle
Performance figures
- Tractive effort: 11,862 lbf (52.76 kN)
Career
- Operators: Illinois Central Railroad
- Numbers: IC 213; IC 221; IC 201; IC 1401
- Retired: November 1928
- Preserved: 2002
- Current owner: Illinois Railway Museum
- Disposition: On static display

Illinois Central 201 is a 2-4-4RT type steam locomotive, originally owned and operated by Illinois Central Railroad. In 1949, the locomotive was operated at the Chicago Railroad Fair as part of the "Wheels A-Rolling" pageant. It is now on static display at Illinois Railway Museum in Union, Illinois.

== Service ==
No. 201 was one of several 2-4-4T locomotives built for commuter service between the edge of the Chicago Loop and the South suburbs (now part of the Metra Electric District).

== Preservation ==
No. 1401 was retired in November 1928 when the IC electrified the route. The rest of the fleet retired in 1935 from yard service; some were sold to other railroads. In 1934, it was renumbered back to No. 201 where it took part at the Chicago Worlds Fair and the Chicago Railroad Fair in 1948-49. In 1975, the locomotive was sold to a private owner and displayed in front of the depot in Owatonna, Minnesota. It was later donated to the Illinois Railway Museum in 2002.
