= Sandusky (locomotive) =

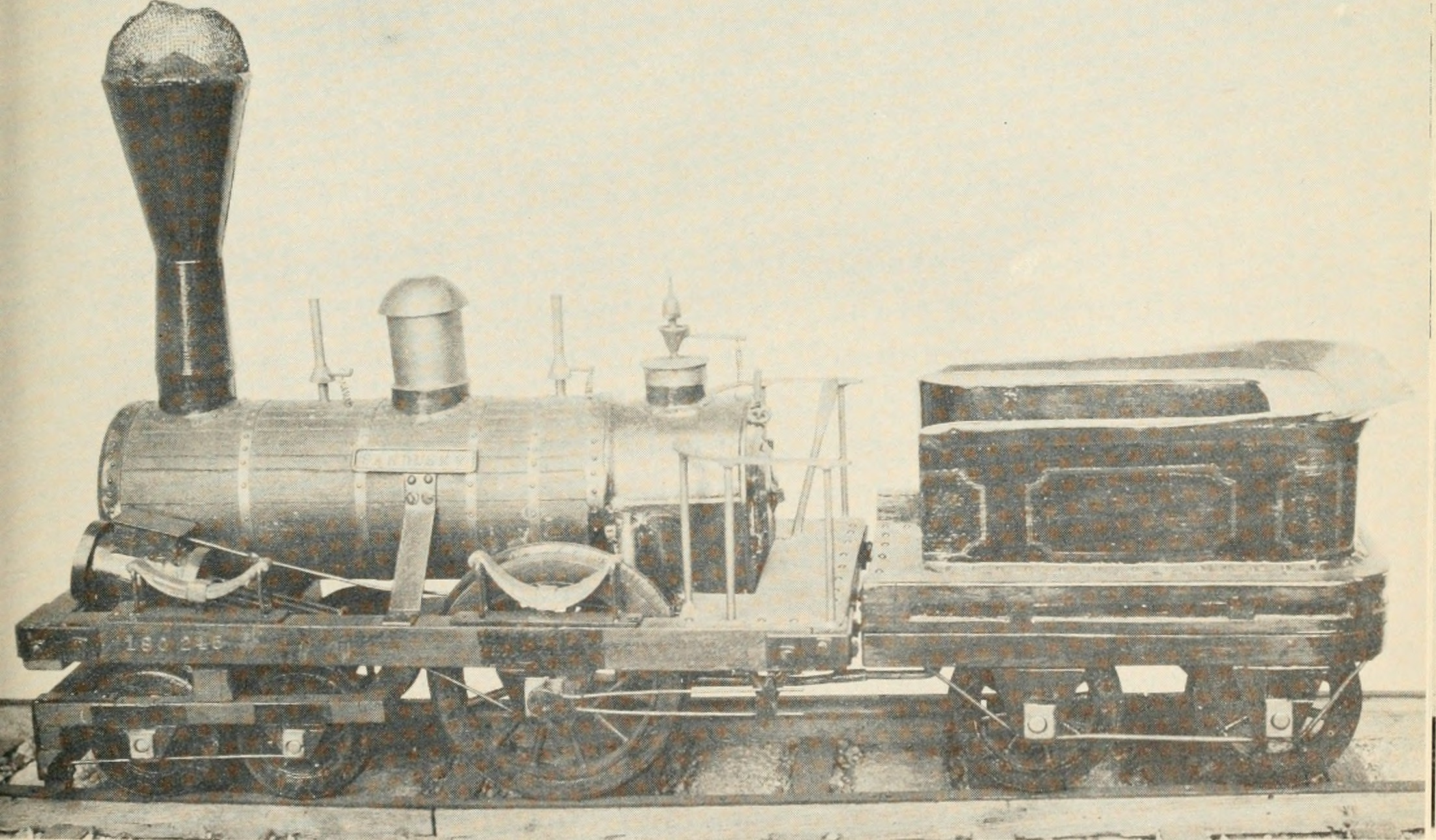
- Model of Sandusky, 1837
Type and origin
- Power type: Steam
- Builder: Rogers, Ketchum & Grosvenor
- Build date: 1837
Specifications
- Configuration
  - Whyte: 4-2-0
- Gauge: 4 ft 10 in (1,473 mm)
- Leading dia.: 2 feet 6 inches (762 mm)
- Driver dia.: 4 feet 6 inches (1,372 mm)
- Cylinder size: 11 in × 16 in (279 mm × 406 mm) dia. x stroke
Career
- Operators: Mad River and Lake Erie Railroad
- First run: December 2, 1837 in Ohio

Sandusky was the name of a steam railroad locomotive, a 4-2-0, built in the United States. This locomotive included engineering features that hadn't been used before in locomotive construction and it played an integral role in the railroad history of Ohio.

== History ==
Sandusky was the first locomotive built by Rogers, Ketchum & Grosvenor; it was completed in 1837. Thomas Rogers, the manufacturing company's founder, designed the locomotive. While some references cite Sandusky as the first locomotive built in the United States, the Best Friend of Charleston is more widely accepted as the first; the Best Friend of Charleston was built in 1831.

The Sandusky, however, was the first locomotive to feature counterweights in its driving wheels to offset the force of the piston stroke and the combined weight of the axle, wheels and piston rod against the railroad track. Rogers filed a patent for the engine's counterbalance on July 12, 1837. Sandusky also featured the first use of hollow oval-shaped spokes in its driving wheels.

While Sandusky was built for the New Jersey Railroad and Transportation Company, that railroad never actually purchased the engine. It was eventually sold to the Mad River and Lake Erie Railroad (MR&LE), the first railroad built in Ohio. Through this purchase, Sandusky earned a couple more firsts — it became the first locomotive to cross the Allegheny Mountains (although this crossing was made by river ferry and not by rail) and it was the first locomotive to operate in Ohio. Its transportation to Ohio was supervised by Thomas Hogg. The Sandusky pulled the first train on the MR&LE from Sandusky to Bellevue.

== Timeline ==
- October 3 or October 6, 1837: The Sandusky makes its first trial run between Paterson, Jersey City, and New Brunswick New Jersey. Some references cite October 3 while others cite October 6 as the locomotive's first trial operations.
- October 14, 1837: The Mad River & Lake Erie railroad purchases Sandusky.
- December 2, 1837: Sandusky makes its first run on the MR&LE in Ohio.

== See also ==
- Paul Rapsey Hodge
