= Paul Rapsey Hodge =

English-American inventor and mechanical engineer

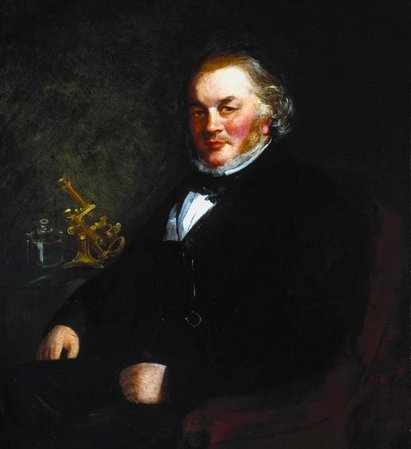
Paul Rapsey Hodge, ca. 1855

Paul Rapsey Hodge (15 July 1808 – 21 October 1871) was an English-American inventor and mechanical engineer. He invented technological improvements used by railroad companies. He also invented a device that ground wheat and other grains into flour that could then be used by bakers, as well as a machine that turned vegetable pulp into paper that could be used by printers. His innovations were useful to many industries. He was a writer of technical manuals in both the United States and England.

== Biography ==
Hodge was born on 15 July 1808, at St. Austell in Cornwall, South West England. He immigrated to the United States around 1836 and worked initially as a draftsman for the locomotive builder Thomas Rogers in Paterson, New Jersey.

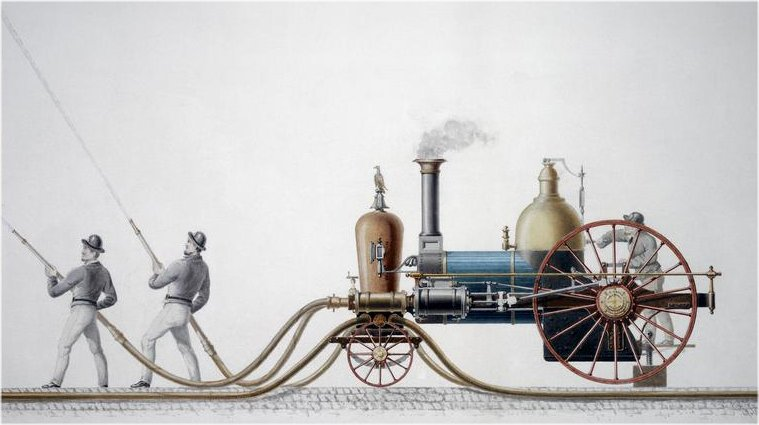
Hodge's 1840 steam fire engine of New York City

Under the sponsorship of an insurance company, in 1840–1841, Hodge designed and built the first steam-powered fire engine in the United States. (Note: Antedating this steam fire engine by a decade, in England the Braithwaite and Ericsson company had built a firetruck that weighed two tons, and put out 40 tons of water per hour to a height of 90 ft 0 in (27.43 m).) It was also the first self-propelled fire engine; the engine used a dog clutch on the rear axle for movement, navigation, and steering. It could throw a jet of water of 290 tons per hour (about 20 US gallons (76 L) per second) 166 ft 0 in (50.60 m) high. The horizontal cylinders lined up with the pump cylinders and worked with a pair of driving wheels. At the front axle, ahead of the smoke-box, was an air vessel that activated a bell. In 1896 the fire engine was reported to have weighed around seven or eight tons, and was 13 ft .5 in (3.98 m) long. The large back wheels of the fire engine were lifted off the ground by a built-in jackscrew when pumping water for use on a fire, whereupon they served as flywheels for the engine as it pumped.

Hodge's fire engine was unpopular with the firefighters of the Pearl Hose Company #28 in New York City because its weight made it unwieldy to move down the streets. It was ultimately sold to another fire department and used as a stand-alone pumping engine that was not self-propelled. This was the only fire engine built by Hodge. No progress was made in that direction by anyone in the following decade. In 1847 Hodge moved back to England and became an eminent engineer there. His business address at the time was 140 Strand in London. One of his business activities was as a writer of technical manuals for steam engines.

== Patents ==
Hodge patented some 16 inventions. These included railroad improvements like a self-lubricating axle box for railway cars and a rubber spring-assisted railroad frog switching device. In 1856, he invented a device for grinding wheat and other farinaceous grains and in the treatment of the flour made. In 1859, he invented papermaking machinery that turned vegetable pulp into paper material. In 1861, he patented a hydraulic press for pressing of hay, straw, hops, hemp, flax, cotton, and animal wool for making vegetable and animal oils. He made a hop separator for breweries. He invented machinery for processing felted cloth, machinery that produced dinnerware, and improvements in machinery technology for the smelting of glass, metal, and porcelain. He also made improvements to machinery that made pigments for ink, gas lighting, and waterproofing fabrics.

== Works ==
- The Steam Engine: Its Origin and Gradual Improvement (1840) – includes a description of a locomotive engine that he built for Rogers Locomotive and Machine Works of Paterson, New Jersey. Hodge's description of the Dunham Engine was little more than a listing of parts. He mentioned that the usual steam pressure was 50 pounds per square inch, and that the engine had been tested pulling a 220-ton train at 14 miles per hour up a slope. This was the earliest work to contain a complete drawing of an American locomotive. He worked for the Rogers Company on the locomotive Sandusky. (Note: While working for the Rogers Company on the Sandusky, his drawings were so poorly executed that the firebox would not fit into the boiler shell. He was terminated for incompetence as a result.)
- Principles and Application of the Steam Engine (1849).
- Valuable Work on the Steam-Engine (1851).

== Personal life ==
Hodge was a member of the Institution of Civil Engineers and the Institution of Mechanical Engineers. He was a member of the Railway Signalmen and Switchmen's Benefit Society. Hodge died on October 21, 1871, and is buried in St Giles' Church courtyard at Camberwell in South London.
