= Swinburne, Smith and Company =

Swinburne, Smith and Company was an American railroad locomotive manufacturing company of the mid-19th century. The company was founded in 1845, in Paterson, New Jersey, by a partnership between William Swinburne and Samuel Smith. Swinburne had been a pattern maker for Rogers, Ketchum and Grosvenor of Paterson, who worked his way up to become shop foreman. Smith was foreman moulder at Rogers.

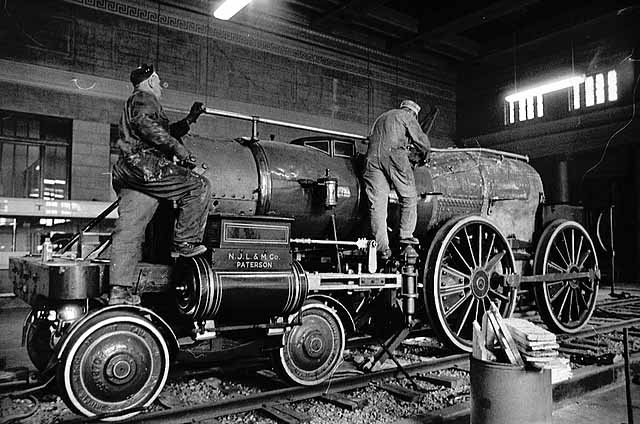
The William Crooks, bearing the imprint of the New Jersey Locomotive and Machine Company, being dismantled for a move to the Lake Superior Railroad Museum.

The company's first major client was the Erie Railway. Other customers included the Delaware, Lackawanna and Western Railroad and the Chicago and Alton Railroad.

Swinburne remained in business for only a decade, failing with the Panic of 1857. Afterwards, the firm reorganized, with James Jackson joining the partnership, and became the New Jersey Locomotive and Machine Company. John Brandt was the superintendent and principal design engineer. Among the engines produced by the successor firm is the William Crooks, the first locomotive to operate in Minnesota. It was delivered to a predecessor of the Great Northern Railway in 1861, and is the sole surviving engine built by the firm.

In 1863 the company experienced financial difficulties. Banker David B. Grant took control of the company and changed its name to Grant Locomotive Works.
