= Mad River and Lake Erie Railroad =

Overview
- Locale: Ohio
- Dates of operation: 1835–1892

Technical
- Track gauge: 4 ft 10 in (1,473 mm)

The Mad River and Lake Erie Railroad was the second railroad to be built and operated in the U.S. state of Ohio (the Erie and Kalamazoo Railroad was first, beginning operations in Toledo during the Toledo War in 1836). It was also the first railroad company chartered west of the Allegheny Mountains.

== History ==
The railroad first broke ground in Sandusky, for construction on September 17, 1835 at the site which is currently Battery Park Marina.

On November 17, 1837, the MR&LE took delivery of its first steam locomotive, Sandusky, built by Rogers, Ketchum and Grosvenor of Paterson, New Jersey. Sandusky was also the first locomotive built by Rogers, Ketchum and Grosvenor, and the first to include features such as cast iron driving wheels and counterweights. The locomotive's transportation from New Jersey was overseen by Thomas Hogg. He was engineer for the locomotive for many years, and later became the railroad's chief mechanical engineer.

The MR&LE used a rail gauge of 4 ft 10 in (1,473 mm), a gauge that soon became known as "Ohio gauge".

At the time of the Sandusky's arrival, no track had been laid by the railroad. The locomotive was used to aid construction, and the first trains (passenger cars only) began running on the line on April 11, 1838, between Sandusky and Bellevue, Ohio.

Construction continued on the MR&LE, reaching Tiffin by 1841 and Kenton in 1846. The railroad was completed to Springfield in 1849. Over the next several decades, the Mad River and Lake Erie Railroad changed ownership at least four times. In 1892, it came under the control of the Big Four Railroad (Cleveland, Cincinnati, Chicago, and St. Louis Railroad), which itself became part of the New York Central Railroad. Most of the original MR&LE lines were abandoned by Penn Central at the advent of Conrail in 1976, if not earlier. However, a portion between Bellefontaine and Springfield continues in operation by RailAmerica's Indiana and Ohio Central Railroad.

Although most of the MR&LE lines that once ran through downtown Sandusky have been removed, tracks serving the Norfolk Southern coal docks located west of downtown still use a small portion of the original MR&LE right-of-way.

== Bibliography ==
- Hudson, William S. (1876). Locomotives and Locomotive Building. New York: J.W. Pratt.
