= Henry R. Dunham =

Henry R. Dunham was an American engineer and machinist. He was known for designing and manufacturing steam engines, most notably the Dunham Engine.

== Biography ==
Dunham was born in New York during either the late 18th or early 19th century. Dunham's early life is unknown, as he first appears in the historical record in 1834. In 1837 Dunham opened a machine shop on North Moore Street in New York City, later partnering with William Browning to found H.R Dunham and Co., an engineering firm specializing in the manufacture of steam engines. Dunham's firm produced 16 engines from 1836 to 1838, with Dunham's engines being advertised in advertisements and in an issue of the American Railroad Journal. Drawings of Dunham's engine appears in Paul Rapsey Hodge's 1840 book The Steam Engine. Dunham also manufactured parts for other companies.

Dunham's engines were similar in design to early engines by Baldwin Locomotive Works. He was also granted a patent for an improved rail wheel.

H.R. Dunham and Co. continued operating with both partners until Browning left the venture in 1847. Dunham likely continued in the business until 1856, the last year his products were listed in a New York directory.

As of 1849, Dunham was part of the American Institute of the City of New York's committee on manufacturers. In 1851 his name appears on senatorial documents crediting for him for manufacturing boilers used on the navy steam ship Fulton - likely USS Fulton.
