= William Swinburne (locomotive builder) =

William Swinburne (1805–1883) was an American businessman and locomotive builder who pioneered steam locomotive building in the United States. He was a founder of Swinburne, Smith and Company.

== Biography ==
Swinburne was born in Brooklyn, New York, in 1805. By 1833 he had moved to Paterson, New Jersey, where, in 1837 he was employed by Rogers, Ketchum and Grosvenor as a pattern maker. He was later promoted to shop foreman.

He left Rogers in 1845 to form his own company, Swinburne, Smith and Company, in a partnership with Samuel Smith, a foreman moulder at Rogers. Swinburne's company did not survive the Panic of 1857 and was reorganized in 1858 as the New Jersey Locomotive and Machine Company.

After leaving the locomotive manufacturing trade, Swinburne held a number of public offices in Paterson until his death in 1883.
