= Morris Ketchum =

American railway entrepreneur

Morris Ketchum (February 5, 1796 – January 1, 1880) was an American banker and financier of the 19th century.

== Early life ==
Ketchum was born on February 5, 1796, at Waterford in Saratoga County, New York. He was the fourth child of Amos Ketchum (1765–1835) and Arabella (née Landon) Ketchum. Among his siblings were Mary Ketchum (wife of Dr. Samuel Akerly who founded the New York Institute for Special Education in 1831) and Hiram Ketchum.

== Career ==
In 1832 he partnered with Thomas Rogers and Jasper Grosvenor to form the manufacturing firm of Rogers, Ketchum and Grosvenor; this firm eventually grew into Rogers Locomotive Works, the second most popular steam locomotive manufacturing company in North America.

Ketchum was also a director of the Illinois Central Railroad. During his time on the board, he was able to funnel many of that railroad's locomotive orders to Rogers.

In the 1860s, he partnered with Peter Cooper, John Jacob Astor Jr., Hamilton Fish and others to form a new committee, the Special Council of Hygiene and Public Health. Joseph Smith served as president and Dr. Willard Parker was vice-president.

Morris Ketchum, with his son Edward B. Ketchum, led the financial firm of Ketchum, Son and Company in New York City. His son Edward was later found to have embezzled nearly $2.5 million to cover his losses in the 1860s; it was Morris's good reputation that kept the public from suspecting Edward of embezzlement for a time. Morris had to resign as president of the Fourth National Bank of New York.

=== Later career ===
After giving up his fortune to make good on his sons forgeries in 1865, Ketchum moved south and became interested in the Savannah Banking and Trust Company of Savannah, Georgia, and the Central Railroad.

== Personal life ==
Ketchum was married three times. His later marriage was to Margaret Miller (1807–1893), a daughter of Judge Sylvanus Miller of Long Island. He was the father of three sons and two daughters that survived him, including:

- Charles Jessup Ketchum (1839–1893)
- Landon Ketchum (1842–1910), who married Ann Augusta Burritt (1842–1867), a daughter of Francis Burritt. After her death, he married Isabella Landon Jones (1838–1903).
- Miller Ketchum (1842–1892), who married Mary W. Coffin in 1868.
- Margaret Ketchum (1847–1929), who married Dr. Willard Parker Jr., a son of surgeon Willard Parker

Ketchum died at his home, 19 Washington Square in New York City, on January 1, 1880. He was buried at Willowbrook Cemetery in Westport, Connecticut.
