= Willard Parker (surgeon) =

American surgeon

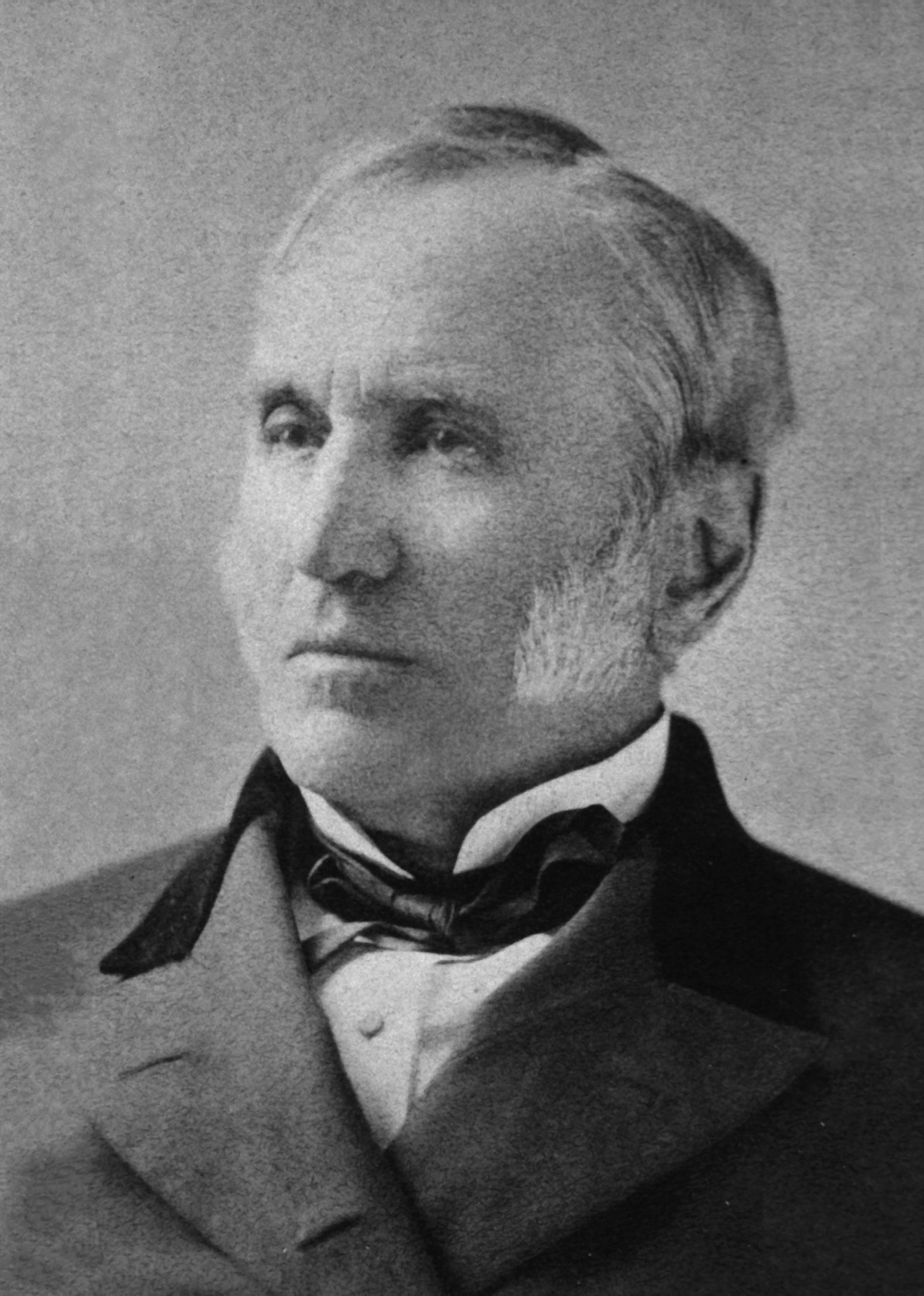
- Born: September 2, 1800; Lyndeborough, New Hampshire, U.S.
- Died: April 25, 1884 (aged 83); New York City, U.S.

Signature
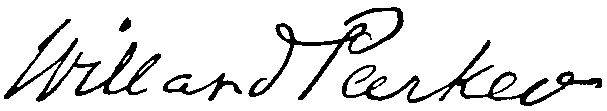

Willard Parker (September 2, 1800 – April 25, 1884) was a surgeon of the United States, for many years a professor at the New York College of Physicians and Surgeons and other schools.

== Early life ==
Willard Parker was born in 1800 in North Lyndeborough, New Hampshire, to tavern owner Jonathan Parker and his wife, Hannah Clark, daughter of Lyndeborough potter and Revolutionary War veteran Major Peter Clark.

An ancestor came from England in 1644 and settled at Chelmsford, Massachusetts, to which place his family returned when Willard was five years old. He taught in the district schools to obtain means to enter Harvard College, where he graduated in 1826. He then opened a school in Charlestown with the intention of studying for the ministry, but subsequently decided to adopt the profession of medicine. He became the private pupil of John C. Warren, the professor of surgery in Harvard, and attended medical lectures in Boston. He received the degree of M.D. from Harvard in 1830.

== Career ==
He was at once appointed professor of anatomy in the Vermont Medical College, and in the same year accepted the chair of anatomy in the Berkshire Medical College, and in 1833 also that of surgery. In 1836 he was appointed professor of surgery in the Cincinnati Medical College, and afterward spent some time in the hospitals of Paris and London. In 1839 he became professor of surgery in the New York College of Physicians and Surgeons, which post he resigned after a service of 30 years, but accepted that of professor of clinical surgery.

In the spring of 1840, appreciating the want of practical demonstration in teaching surgery, and the difficulty in securing cases for illustration in colleges that were unconnected with hospitals, he visited with his students two or three of the city dispensaries, selected interesting cases, and had them taken to the College of Physicians and Surgeons, where the anatomical theatre offered superior advantages for making diagnoses and performing operations before the class. This was the first college clinic in the United States.

In 1843, he organized the New York Pathological Society, and in 1846 a society for the relief of widows and orphans of medical men. He organized the New York Academy of Medicine in 1847, of which he was president for many years after 1856. In 1846, with Dr. James R. Wood, he secured the necessary legislation to reorganize the city almshouse into what is now Bellevue Hospital, and was appointed one of its visiting surgeons. In 1864–1866 he was active in procuring legislation to create the New York City Board of Health, made many visits to Albany in its behalf, and was one of its members from its organization.

In 1865 he was elected president of the New York State Inebriate Asylum at Binghamton, succeeding Valentine Mott. This was the first institution ever established for the treatment of inebriety as a disease. His treatment of his patients being based on the theory that alcohol is essentially a poison, that it cannot be considered as food, and should be used only in exceptional cases and under the advice of a physician. In 1870 he received the degree of LL.D. from the college of New Jersey at Princeton.

Parker was the first to point out a condition which is known as concussion of the nerves, as distinguished from concussion of the nerve centres, and which had been previously mistaken for one of inflammation. The operation of cystotomy for the relief of chronic cystitis, and also that for the cure of abscess of the appendix vermiformis, are among his contributions to the art of surgery.

He died in New York City in 1884.

== Publications ==
He published several monographs in medical journals, including:

- "Cystotomy” (1850)
- “Spontaneous Fractures” (1852)
- “On the High Operation for Stone in the Female” (1855)
- “The Concussion of Nerves” (1856)
- “Ligature of the Subclavian Artery” (1864)
- “Cancer,” a lecture (1873)
