= Jasper Grosvenor =

American financier (1794–1857)

Jasper Grosvenor (1794–1857) was an American financier of the early to mid 19th century. In 1832 he partnered with Thomas Rogers and Morris Ketchum to form the manufacturing firm Rogers, Ketchum and Grosvenor which became the second most popular steam locomotive manufacturing company in North America in the 19th century. He remained a partner in the business until his death in 1857.

Jasper lived in New York City with his wife Matilda, on the same upscale city block as William H. Aspinwall (founder of the Pacific Mail Steamship Company and the Panama Railroad). The Grosvenors were a religious family and were patrons of New York's Church of the Ascension; after Jasper's death, Matilda donated one of the stained glass windows in the church, the Grosvenor Memorial by Frederic Crowninshield which depicts "Angels at the Sepulchre," in Jasper's memory. Matilda Grosvenor survived Jasper to die in 1885.
