= Llantrisant rail accident =

1893 railway accident in Wales

Coordinates: 51.5421°N 3.3731°W

Details
- Date: 12 August 1893
- Location: Llantrisant
- Country: Wales
- Line: Taff Vale Railway
- Cause: Locomotive suspension failure

Statistics
- Trains: 1
- Deaths: 13
- Injured: 12

On 12 August 1893 a T-link broke beneath a locomotive running down the bank from Merthyr to Cardiff hauling a passenger train. This allowed an underhung spring to break away from the engine and foul the wheels of the leading van, derailing the entire train. The first six carriages ran down an embankment, killing thirteen.

== Sources ==
- Rolt, L.T.C.; Kichenside, Geoffrey (1982) [1955]. Red for Danger (4th ed.). Newton Abbot: David & Charles. p. 82. ISBN 0-7153-8362-0.
