= Jacob S. Rogers =

American businessman

Jacob S. Rogers (c. 1824 – 2 July 1901) was an American businessman.

== Biography ==
He was the son of Thomas Rogers, the founder of Rogers, Ketchum & Grosvenor.

When Thomas Rogers died in 1856, Jacob took over the business and reorganized it as Rogers Locomotive and Machine Works and served as the company's president. The company eventually became the second most popular steam locomotive manufacturer in North America. Jacob Rogers was involved in an accident where he was struck by a cable car on Broadway in New York on February 9, 1899; his injuries were not life-threatening and he was treated at the Astor House.

Upon Rogers' death in 1901, he bequeathed the majority of his fortune, amounting to $8 million, to the Metropolitan Museum of Art in New York City. The Museum continues to acquire art works in his name through the "Jacob S. Rogers Fund."

Rogers is buried in the family plot at Cedar Lawn Cemetery in Paterson, New Jersey.
