= Rogers Locomotive and Machine Works =

19th-century steam locomotive manufacturer in Paterson, NJ

Coordinates: 40.9135°N 74.1790°W

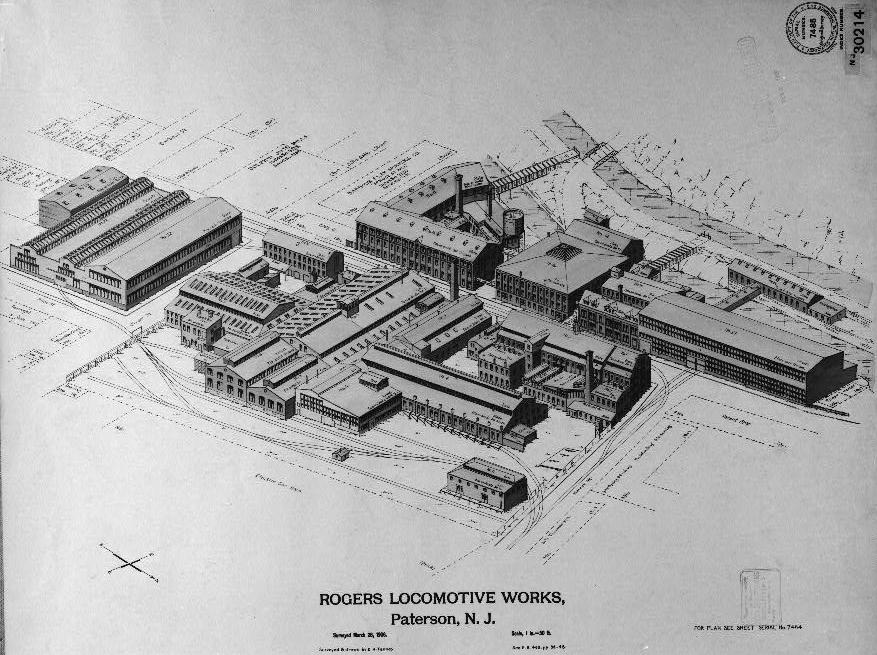
- An aerial view drawing of the Rogers Locomotive Works plant on March 28, 1906
- Industry: Rail transport
- Founded: 1832 (as Rogers, Ketchum and Grosvenor)
- Founders: Thomas Rogers; Morris Ketchum; Jasper Grosvenor
- Defunct: 1905
- Fate: Merged
- Successor: American Locomotive Company
- Headquarters: Paterson, New Jersey, United States
- Products: Steam locomotives and rolling stock

Rogers Locomotive and Machine Works was a manufacturer of railroad steam locomotives based in Paterson, in Passaic County, New Jersey, in the United States. Between its founding in 1832 and its acquisition in 1905, the company built more than 6,000 steam locomotives for railroads around the world. Most 19th-century U.S. railroads owned at least one Rogers-built locomotive. The company's most famous product was a locomotive named The General, built in December 1855, which was one of the principals of the Great Locomotive Chase of the American Civil War.

The company was founded by Thomas Rogers in an 1832 partnership with Morris Ketchum and Jasper Grosvenor as Rogers, Ketchum and Grosvenor. Rogers remained president until his death in 1856. His son, Jacob S. Rogers, reorganized the company as Rogers Locomotive and Machine Works and led the company until he retired in 1893. Robert S. Hughes then became president and reorganized the company as Rogers Locomotive Company, which he led until his death in 1900.

Rogers avoided the 1901 American Locomotive Company (ALCO) merger by closing and reopening as Rogers Locomotive Works, but the company's independence lasted only until 1905, when ALCO purchased it. ALCO continued building new steam locomotives at the Rogers plant until 1913 and used the Rogers facilities through the 1920s as a parts storage facility and warehouse. Eventually, ALCO sold the property to private investors.

Today, several Rogers-built locomotives exist in railroad museums around the world, and the plant's erecting shop is preserved as the Thomas Rogers Building; it is the current location of the Paterson Museum, whose mission is to preserve and display Paterson's industrial history.

== 1831 to 1856: Thomas Rogers era ==
The firm that was to become Rogers Locomotive Works began in 1831. Thomas Rogers had been designing and building machinery for textile manufacturing for nearly 20 years when he sold his interest in Godwin, Rogers & Company (of which he was the Rogers part of the name) in June of that year. Rogers set out on his own with a new company called Jefferson Works in Paterson, New Jersey. The Jefferson Works built textile and agricultural machinery for a year before Rogers met the two men who would help transform the company into a major locomotive manufacturer.

In 1832, Rogers partnered with two investors from New York City, Morris Ketchum and Jasper Grosvenor. Jefferson Works was renamed Rogers, Ketchum & Grosvenor, and the company began to diversify into the railroad industry. The company soon manufactured springs, axles and other small parts for railroad use.

The first locomotive that Rogers' company assembled was actually built by Robert Stephenson and Company of England in 1835. This locomotive was the McNeil for the Paterson and Hudson River Railroad. It took another two years before Rogers received its first order for a complete locomotive. In 1837, the Mad River and Lake Erie Railroad ordered two locomotives from Rogers to form the beginning of the railroad's roster. The first of these two locomotives was the Sandusky, which became the first locomotive to cross the Allegheny Mountains (albeit by canal boat and not by rail), and the first locomotive to operate in Ohio.

Sandusky included features designed by Thomas Rogers that had not been seen in locomotive construction to date. It was also the first locomotive to use cast iron driving wheels, and the wheels included built-in counterweights to reduce the amount of wear on the track caused by the weight of the driving rod and wheel all coming down at once during the wheels' rotations. Before Sandusky's construction, driving wheels were typically built with wooden spokes, much like wagon wheels. Some accounts also state that Sandusky was the first locomotive to feature a whistle, but this has since been proven false.

Rogers was not working completely alone in American locomotive manufacturing. In 1837, in addition to building the company's first locomotive, Rogers also filled orders from fellow locomotive builders Matthias W. Baldwin (founder of Baldwin Locomotive Works) and William Norris (founder of Norris Locomotive Works) for locomotive tires of various sizes. Once Rogers started working on his own locomotives, however, no further orders from either Baldwin or Norris were forthcoming.

Within Rogers' own shop, William Swinburne worked as the shop foreman until he moved on to form his own locomotive manufacturing company, Swinburne, Smith and Company in 1845. After Swinburne left Rogers, John Cooke also worked at the Rogers plant. Like Swinburne, Cooke later went on to form his own locomotive manufacturing firm, Danforth, Cooke & Company. Another engineer who worked at Rogers was Zerah Colburn, the well known locomotive engineer and, later editor and publisher. Colburn was, around 1854, "superintendent and/or consultant" at the works where he introduced a number of improvements in locomotive design. His assistant was William S. Hudson who succeeded Rogers after he died in 1856, and was responsible for further engineering enhancement. Hudson would remain with Rogers until his own death in 1881.

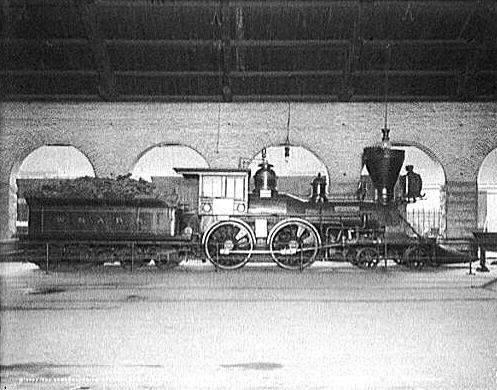
The General on display in Chattanooga, Tennessee, c. 1907

Rogers locomotives were, from very early in the company's history, seen as powerful, capable engines on American railroads. The Uncle Sam, serial number 11, a 4-2-0 (a locomotive with two unpowered axles in front, followed by one powered axle) built in 1839 for the New Jersey Railroad and Transportation Company, was noted by American Railroad Journal for hauling a 24-car train up a grade of 26 feet per mile (4.9 m/km) or 0.49% at 24.5 mph (39.4 km/h). In 1846, Rogers built what is referred to as the largest 6-wheel truck engine (4-2-0) in the United States; the Licking, serial number 92, built for the Mansfield and Sandusky Railroad, generated 110 psi (760 kPa) of steam pressure and could pull a 380-short-ton (345 t; 339-long-ton) train up a grade of 16 feet per mile (3 m/km) or 0.3%.

Arguably, the most famous locomotive to come out of the Rogers shops was built in 1855. Rogers built a 4-4-0, serial number 631, in December of that year for the Western and Atlantic Railroad. The railroad named the locomotive The General. This locomotive, best known for being at the heart of an American Civil War incident, is now on display at the Southern Museum of Civil War and Locomotive History (the Big Shanty Museum) in Kennesaw, Georgia.

Not only were Rogers locomotives known in the industry for their power, but they were also known for their endurance. It is estimated that one locomotive, Illinois Central Railroad 4-4-0 number 23, serial number 449, built in December 1853, operated over one million miles (1.6×10^{6} km) in its thirty-year career on the Illinois Central.

== 1856 to 1905: Reorganization and decline ==
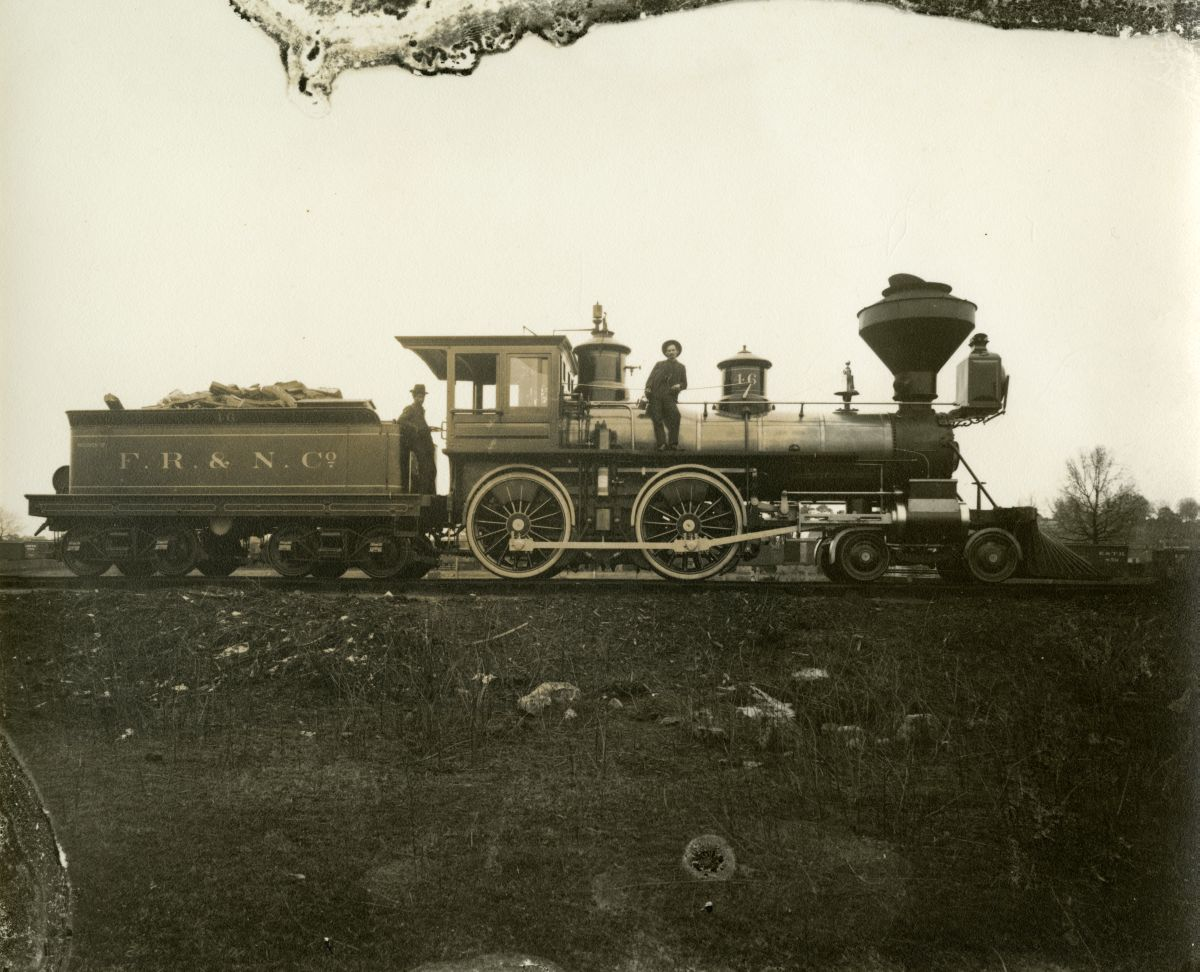
Florida Railway and Navigation Company Engine 46 and crew, ca. 1885 is a 4-4-0 locomotive, built by Rogers Locomotive and Machine Works, const. no. 3601.

When Thomas Rogers died in 1856, his son Jacob S. Rogers reorganized RK&G, with Ketchum and Grosvenor remaining as investors, as the Rogers Locomotive & Machine Works. Rogers built their first 2-6-0, which is sometimes referred to as the first 2-6-0 built in the United States, in 1863 for the New Jersey Railroad and Transportation Company. The company continued manufacturing both locomotives and textile machinery for nearly another 20 years.

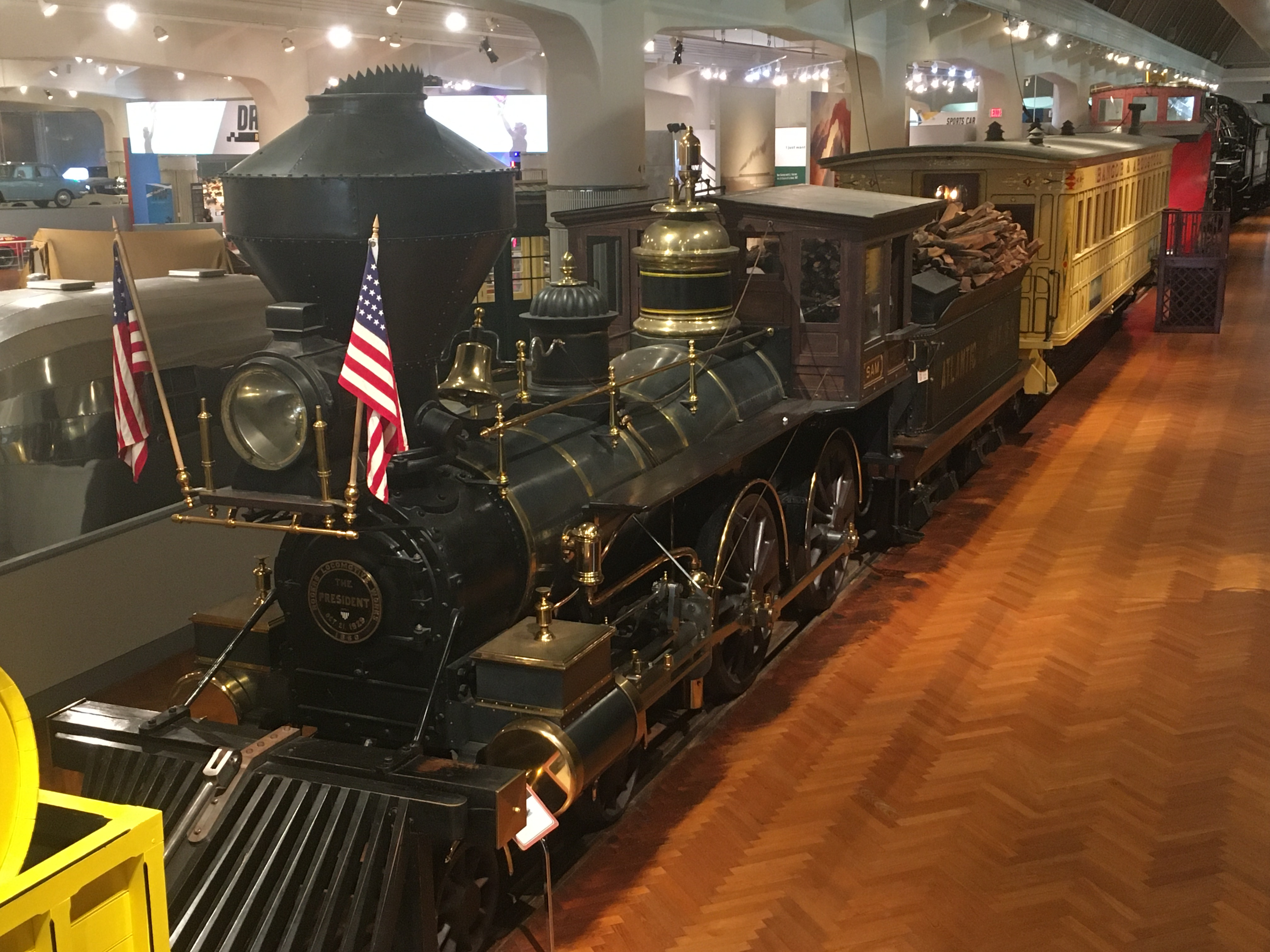
This 4-4-0 engine, at the Henry Ford Museum, was built in 1858 by Rogers as the "Satilla" for the Atlantic & Gulf RR in Georgia. In 1924, Henry Ford had it restored at his Rouge Factory, renaming it the "Sam Hill" after an engineer he admired as a boy. In 1929, the engine (renamed "The President" in honor of Herbert Hoover) pulled a train carrying Henry Ford, Thomas Edison and President Hoover from Detroit to Dearborn, Michigan for the opening ceremony of the Henry Ford Museum.

In November 1868 Rogers delivered five identical coal-burning 4-4-0 steam locomotives (assigned Nos. 116–120) to the Union Pacific Railroad, which were subsequently placed into freight service in western Wyoming and Utah. Union Pacific No. 119 would gain fame on May 10, 1869, when it took part in the "Golden Spike" ceremony at Promontory, Utah, to celebrate the completion of the First transcontinental railroad. The unit was rebuilt in the early 1880s, and redesignated as road No. 343 in 1885. No. 119 was retired and sent to the scrapyard after nearly 35 years of service in April 1903. A full-scale, operating replica was completed in 1979, and now is part of an operational display at the Golden Spike National Historic Site.

In 1870, Rogers was involved in a suit against Jay Gould, James Fisk Jr., William H. Rasson and C. V. Nason alleging that Rogers was charged unreasonable freight rates when delivering their products; the court decided in favor of Rogers, delivering indictments against the four men. In the mid-1870s, Rogers ended production of textile machinery and began concentrating solely on locomotive manufacturing. Rogers customers of the mid-19th century continued purchasing their locomotives. The Louisville and Nashville Railroad (L&N) purchased so many locomotives from the company that the railroad was given a free locomotive as a thank-you bonus in 1879.

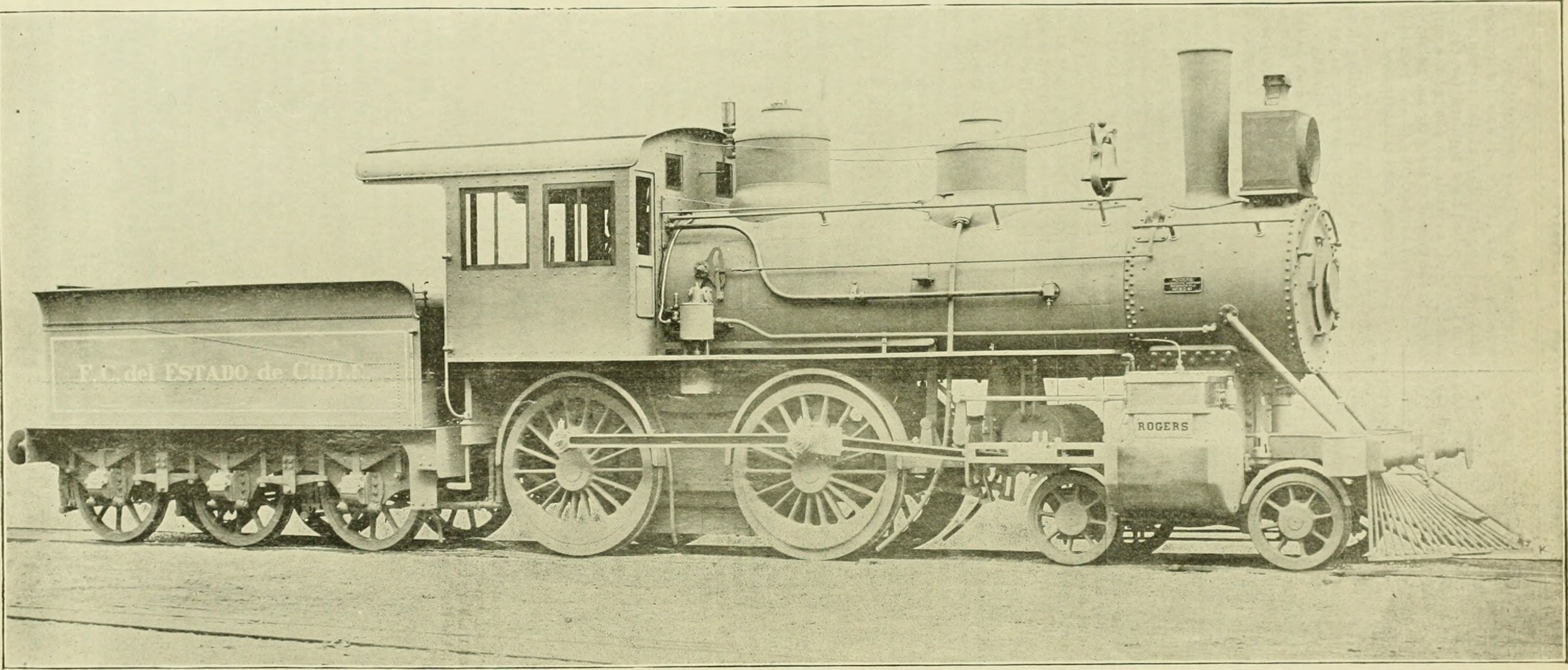
A builder's photo of a Rogers locomotive for the Ferrocarril del Estado de Chile in 1893

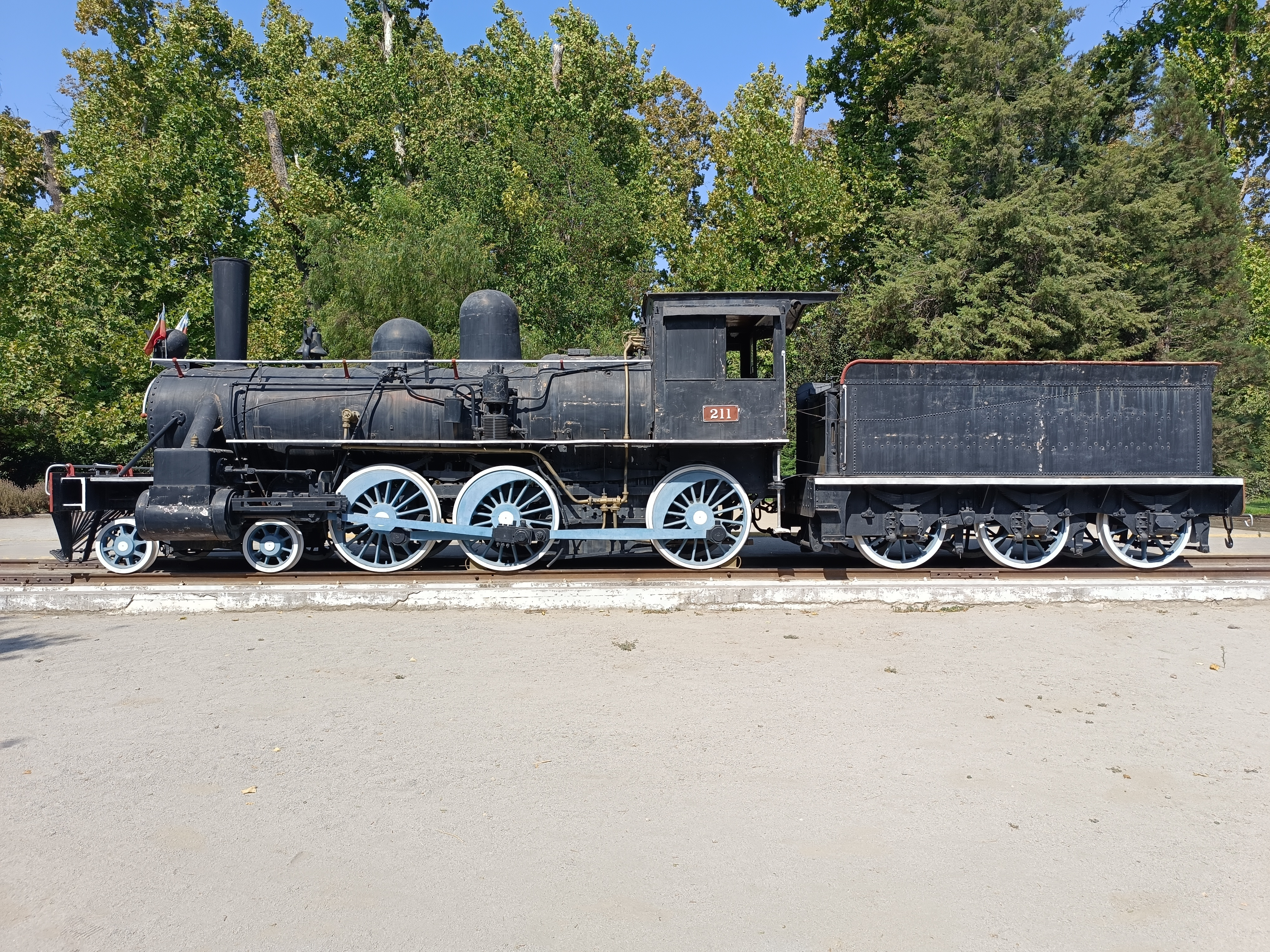
Steam locomotive manufactured by Rogers in 1896, factory number 4955. Santiago Railway Museum, Chile

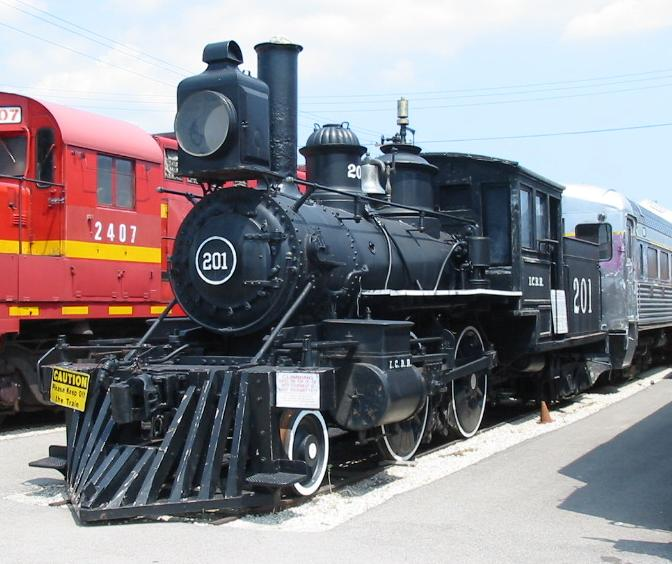
Illinois Central Railroad 201, built by Rogers in 1880, preserved at the Illinois Railway Museum

Reuben Wells was appointed as shop superintendent in 1887. Jacob Rogers, now in his late 70s, gradually passed more and more responsibility to Wells until Rogers resigned the presidency in 1893. The company was then reorganized as the Rogers Locomotive Company. After just over 60 years, the Rogers company would no longer be run by a member of the Rogers family. The company reorganized under its former treasurer and new president, Robert S. Hughes, as the Rogers Locomotive Company; Jacob Rogers remained the company's principal investor. Hughes led the company until his own death in 1900. A year later, Jacob Rogers closed the Rogers Locomotive Company plant.

In 1901, the year that Jacob Rogers died and the same year that the American Locomotive Company (ALCO) was formed through the merger of eight other locomotive manufacturers, the company reopened as the Rogers Locomotive Works. Reuben Wells was again the shop superintendent, but the firm was at a competitive disadvantage. Not enough capital investment was made to purchase new equipment or in research and development. ALCO and Baldwin, the largest locomotive manufacturers in North America, held too much of a lead in manufacturing and selling their own locomotives for Rogers to keep up. Compounding Rogers' troubles further, the firm had no nearby rail connection, the closest railroad, Erie Railroad, being located approximately 0.57 miles (0.92 km) to the east, making transporting materials and locomotives time-consuming, increasingly more so as the surrounding city of Patterson was built up and larger engines were ordered.

== 1905 to present: absorbed into ALCO ==
Faced with stiff competition and an inability to increase its own capacity, Rogers Locomotive Works was purchased by ALCO in 1905. Rogers' last independently built locomotive was serial number 6271, a 0-6-0 tank locomotive built for W. R. Grace & Company in February 1905. ALCO continued building locomotives at the Rogers plant until 1913 when manufacturing at the plant ceased permanently. Locomotives built at the Rogers plant under ALCO are generally referred to as locomotives built by ALCO-Rogers. ALCO used the Rogers plant buildings as warehouses well into the 1920s, but eventually sold off all of the property. The original Rogers erecting shop was converted into office space and was still in use in that manner as late as 1992.

The erecting shop building has since been renamed the "Thomas Rogers Building" and is now the home of the Paterson Museum. The museum preserves and displays artifacts of Paterson's industrial history. A 2-6-0 locomotive that was used in the construction of the Panama Canal is on display outside the museum, but it is one that was built by ALCO-Cooke (the former Cooke Locomotive and Machine Works plant, also located in Paterson) and not by Rogers.

== Preserved Rogers locomotives ==
The following locomotives (in serial number order) built by Rogers have been preserved. Where multiple railroads and road numbers are listed, they are given in chronological order for the locomotives; all locations are in the United States unless noted, engines built from 1905 onwards were post-ALCO acquisition.

Serial number	Wheel arrangement (Whyte notation)	Build date	Operational owner(s)	Disposition
42	4-2-2	March 1843	Matanza Railroad No. 1	Christina Station, Havana, Cuba.
631	4-4-0	December 1855	Western and Atlantic Railroad No. 3 General	Southern Museum of Civil War and Locomotive History, Kennesaw, Georgia.
812	4-4-0	January 1858	Atlantic and Gulf Railroad No. 3	Henry Ford Museum, Dearborn, Michigan
1757	4-4-0	June 1870	Eten Ry No. 2 "Althaus" (most likely identification, possibly also Eten Ry No. 1 or Eten Ry No. 3, also built in 1870).	Remains preserved at Eten, Peru.
1814	0-(2)2-0T - steam car, 4 wheel, 2 drivers	November 1870	Eten Ry "El Guainambi"	Remains preserved at Eten, Peru.
2454	2-4-2	July 1877	New Zealand Railways NZR K 88; Steam Locomotives of New Zealand	The Plains Vintage Railway & Historical Museum, Ashburton, New Zealand.
2468	2-4-2	March 1878	New Zealand Railways K No. 92	https://www.waimeaplainsrailway.co.nz Gore, New Zealand.
2470	2-4-2	March 1878	New Zealand Railways K No. 94	The Plains Vintage Railway & Historical Museum, Ashburton, New Zealand.
2588	2-4-4T	May 1880	Illinois Central Railroad #201	Illinois Railway Museum, Union, Illinois.
3327	4-4-0	August 1883	Canadian Pacific Railway No. 136	South Simcoe Railway, Tottenham, Ontario, Canada.
4493	4-6-0	March 1891	Prescott and Arizona Central Railway No. 3, Sierra No. 3	Currently owned by the State of California, operated at Railtown 1897 State Historic Park, Jamestown, California; operational
4788	4-6-0	November 1892	Burlington and Missouri Railroad No. 309, Chicago, Burlington and Quincy Railroad No. 637	Illinois Railway Museum, Union, Illinois.
4865	0-6-0ST	1893	Chilean State Railways Type 22 No. 205	Santiago Railway Museum, Santiago, Chile.
5086	4-6-0	1896	Chilean State Railways Type 38 No. 248	Hotel Las Acacias de Vitacura, Santiago, Chile.
5001	2-4-0	1894	MINAZ No. 1216	Cuba Libre Sugar Mill, Pedro Betancourt, Cuba.
5425	0-6-0	September 1899	St. Paul and Duluth Railroad No. 74, Northern Pacific No. 924, Empire Paper Company	Northwest Railway Museum, Snoqualmie, Washington. Operational.
5609	4-6-0	August 1900	Mobile and Ohio Railroad No. 187, Columbus and Greenville Railway No. 178	Propst Park, Columbus, Mississippi.
5190	2-8-0	1901	Chilean State Railways Type R No. 3087	Santiago Railway Museum, Santiago, Chile.
5796	2-8-0	August 1902	Great Northern Railway No. 1147	North Central Washington Museum, Wenatchee, Washington.
6178	2-8-0	June 1904	Illinois Central Railroad No. 764	National Museum of Transportation, Kirkwood, Missouri.
6256	4-6-2	January 1905	Louisville and Nashville Railroad #152	Kentucky Railway Museum, New Haven, Kentucky.
6259	0-6-0	January 1905	Atlanta and West Point Railroad No. 4, Western Railway of Alabama No. 104	Georgia RR Depot, Conyers, Georgia.
53115	0-4-0T	June 1913	Los Angeles Harbor Department No. 32	Travel Town Museum, Griffith Park, Los Angeles, California
53880	0-4-0T	June 1913	Macon Iron & Paper Stock No. 30	Georgia State Railroad Museum, Savannah, Georgia

== See also ==
- Paul Rapsey Hodge
- List of locomotive builders
