= Thomas Rogers (locomotive builder) =

American mechanical engineer

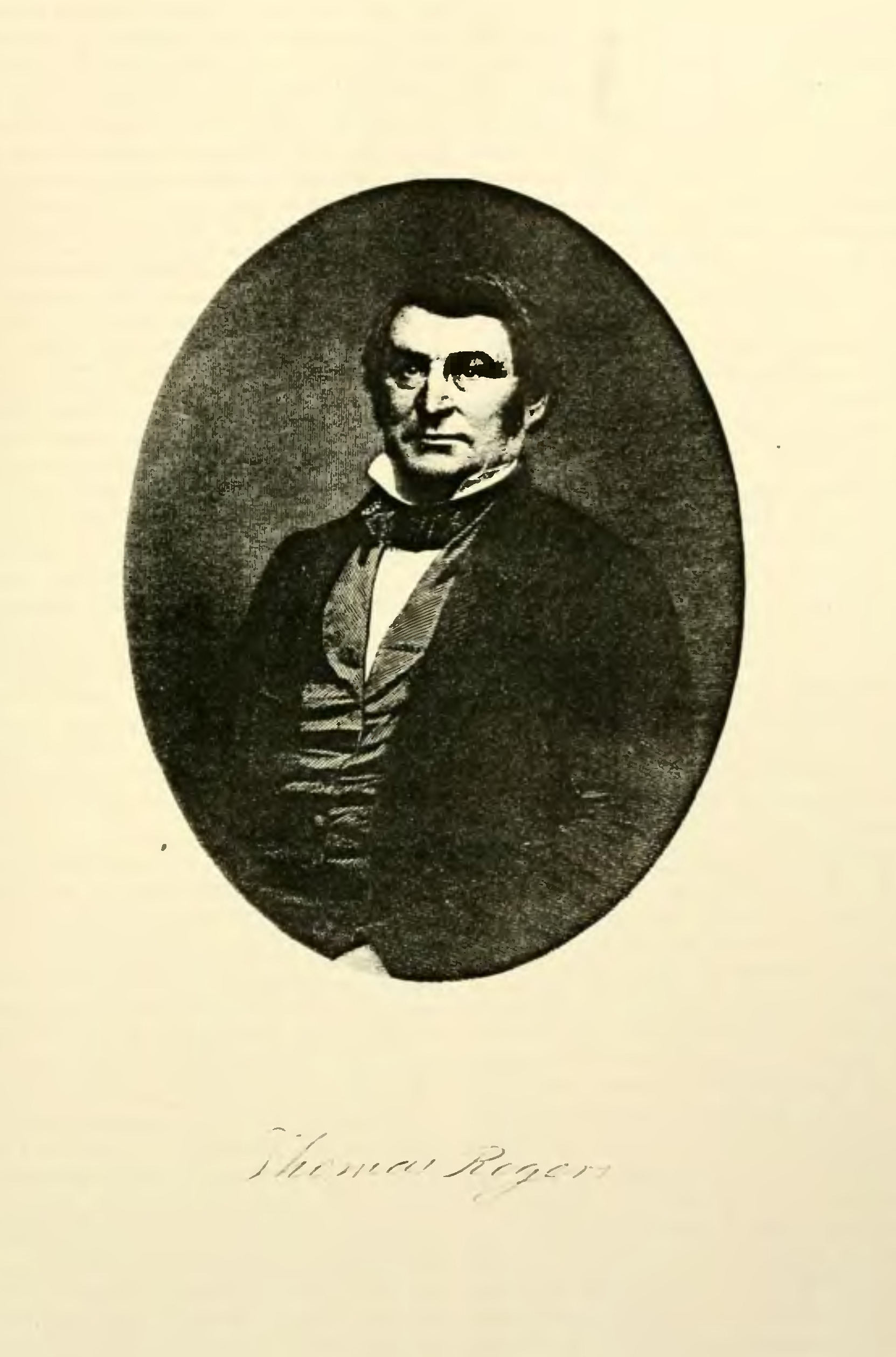
- Born: 1792; Groton, Connecticut
- Died: 1856 (aged 63–64)
- Occupations: Mechanical engineer and businessman
- Known for: Founder of Rogers Locomotive and Machine Works

Thomas Rogers (1792–1856) was an American mechanical engineer and founder of Rogers Locomotive and Machine Works of Paterson, New Jersey. Fellow locomotive designer and builder, Zerah Colburn said that "Thomas Rogers maybe fairly said to have done more for the modern American locomotive than any of his contemporaries."

== Biography ==
Thomas Rogers was born in Groton, Connecticut, in 1792. He was the son of Jason Rogers. Before moving to Paterson in 1812, he studied carpentry and blacksmithing. In 1832 he partnered with Morris Ketchum and Jasper Grosvenor to form Rogers, Ketchum and Grosvenor, building agricultural and textile machinery as well as springs, axles and other small parts for the first railroads of America.

In 1837 Rogers built his first locomotive, Sandusky, which became the first locomotive to operate in Ohio. More importantly, it was the first to use cast iron driving wheels (wooden spokes were common before) and the first to feature counterweights in them to offset the force of the piston stroke and the combined weight of the axle, wheels and piston rod against the railroad track. Rogers filed a patent for the engine's counterbalance on July 12, 1837.

== See also ==
- Paul Rapsey Hodge
