= 1790s in rail transport =

- 1780s
- 1790s in rail transport
Other topics in 1790s:
- Fashion

Rail transport timeline

This article lists events relating to rail transport that occurred during the 1790s.

== 1790 ==
=== Events ===
==== Unknown date events ====
- The world's first railway viaduct, which became known as the "Covered Bridge", is built at Blaenavon in South Wales for a horse-worked tramway carrying coal to the ironworks coke ovens. It is 40 m (130 ft) long with 10 arches and 10 m (33 ft) tall.

== 1791 ==
=== Births ===
==== Unknown date births ====
- John Brandt, American steam locomotive builder (died c. 1860).

== 1792 ==
=== Births ===
==== Unknown date births ====
- Thomas Rogers, founder of Rogers, Ketchum and Grosvenor (died 1856).

== 1793 ==
=== Events ===
==== Unknown date events ====
- The world's oldest surviving railway tunnel is constructed at Fritchley on the "Butterley Gangroad", the Butterley Company's plateway to carry limestone from Hilt's Quarry at Crich to kilns on the Cromford Canal at Bullbridge in Derbyshire, England, by Benjamin Outram.

=== Births ===
==== Unknown date births ====
- Holmes Hinkley, American steam locomotive manufacturer (died 1866).

== 1794 ==
=== Births ===
==== May births ====
- May 27 – Cornelius Vanderbilt, American financier who created the New York Central and Hudson River Railroad from the merger of several smaller railroads in New York (d. 1877).

==== October births ====
- October 22 – Edward Bury, English steam locomotive builder (d. 1858).

==== December births ====
- December 14 – Erastus Corning, established railroads in New York and was instrumental in the formation of New York Central (d. 1872).

==== Unknown date births ====
- Jasper Grosvenor, American financier who partnered with Thomas Rogers and Morris Ketchum to form Rogers, Ketchum and Grosvenor (d. 1857).

== 1795 ==
=== Events ===
==== Unknown date events ====
- A wooden railway on Beacon Hill in Boston carried excavations down the hill to clear the land for the State House

=== Births ===
==== December births ====
- December 10 – Matthias W. Baldwin, American steam locomotive manufacturer (d. 1866).

==== Unknown date births ====
- John B. Jervis, Chief mechanical engineer of the Mohawk and Hudson Railroad who pioneered the use of the leading truck on steam locomotives (d. 1885).

== 1796 ==
=== Births ===
==== February births ====
- February – Morris Ketchum, partner in Rogers, Ketchum and Grosvenor, director of Illinois Central Railroad (d. 1880)

==== April births ====
- April 19 – Franz Anton von Gerstner, Bohemian-born railway civil engineer (d. 1840)

== 1797 ==
=== Births ===
==== July ====
- July 29 – Daniel Drew, board member and financier of the Erie Railroad (d. 1879).

==== Unknown date ====
- Asa Whitney, one of the first backers of an American Transcontinental Railway.

== 1798 ==
=== Events ===
- The Lake Lock Rail Road near Wakefield opens.
- First known use of cast-iron chaired 'fish-belly' edge-rails, at Walker Colliery near Newcastle upon Tyne in the north-east of England.

== 1799 ==
=== Events ===
==== April events ====
- April 15 – The Earl of Carlisle's waggonway opens from coal pits owned by George Howard, 6th Earl of Carlisle around Lambley to Brampton, Cumbria, England.

=== Births ===
==== January births ====
- January 23 – Alois Negrelli, builder of the first railway in Switzerland, connecting Zurich and Baden (d. 1858).

==== February births ====
- February 28 – William Dargan, Irish railway contractor (d. 1867).

==== May births ====
- May – George Hennet, English railway contractor (d. 1857).

==== June births ====
- June 22 – Joseph Pease, English railway promoter (d. 1872).

== See also ==
- Years in rail transport

Preceded by 1780s in rail transport	Rail transport timeline 1790s	Succeeded by 1800s in rail transport
