= 1750s in rail transport =

- 1750s in rail transport
- 1760s

Rail transport timeline

This article lists events relating to rail transport that occurred during the 1750s.

== 1755 ==
=== Births ===
==== September births ====
- September 13 – Oliver Evans, pioneering American steam locomotive designer and inventor is born (died 1819).

== 1756 ==
=== Births ===
==== February births ====
- February 23 – Franz Josef Gerstner, pioneering Austrian railway engineer and physicist (died 1832).

== 1758 ==
=== Events ===
==== June events ====
- June 9 – The Middleton Railway is the first in Great Britain to be granted powers by Act of Parliament. It is built by Charles Brandling to carry coal from his pits at Middleton into Leeds and is at this time a wooden, horse-drawn wagonway with a gauge of 4 ft 1 in (1.254 m); much rebuilt it survives as a heritage railway.

== See also ==
- Years in rail transport

Preceded by 1740s in rail transport	Rail transport timeline 1750s	Succeeded by 1760s in rail transport
