= 1780s in rail transport =

- 1770s
- 1780s in rail transport
- 1790s
Other topics in 1780s:
- Fashion

Rail transport timeline

This article lists events relating to rail transport that occurred during the 1780s.

== 1780 ==
=== Births ===
==== January births ====
- January 26 – John Urpeth Rastrick, English steam locomotive builder and partner in Foster, Rastrick and Company (died 1856).

==== October births ====
- October 25 – Philip Hone, first president of Delaware and Hudson Railway 1825–1826 (died 1851).

== 1781 ==
=== Births ===
==== June births ====
- June 9 – George Stephenson, English steam locomotive builder.

== 1782 ==
=== Births ===
==== Unknown date births ====
- Joseph Treffry (born Joseph Austen), railway promoter in Cornwall, England (died 1850).

== 1783 ==
=== Events ===
- Halbeath Railway opens from the colliery at Halbeath to the harbour at Inverkeithing, Scotland.

== 1784 ==
=== Births ===
- December 30 – Stephen H. Long, American steam locomotive mechanical engineer who helped build the Baltimore and Ohio Railroad (died 1864).

== 1785 ==
=== Births ===
==== Unknown date births ====
- Sir William Cubitt, civil engineer on the South Eastern and Great Northern Railways of England (died 1861).

== 1786 ==
=== Births ===
==== December births ====
- December 22 – Timothy Hackworth, English steam locomotive builder (died 1850).

==== Unknown date births ====
- William T. James, American inventor of the link motion and spark arrester (died 1865).

== 1787 ==
=== Events ===
==== Unknown date events ====
- First production of all-iron edge rail (for underground colliery use), at Plymouth Ironworks, Merthyr Tydfil, South Wales.
- First introduction of plateway (for underground use), at Sheffield Park Colliery, Yorkshire, England, by John Curr.

=== Births ===
==== October births ====
- October 18 – Robert Livingston Stevens, president of the Camden and Amboy Railroad, the first railroad built in New Jersey (died 1856).

== 1788 ==
=== Events ===
==== Unknown date events ====
- First introduction of plateway for surface use, at Wingerworth Iron Foundry, Derbyshire, England, by Joseph Butler.

== 1789 ==
=== Events ===
==== Unknown date events ====
- Oliver Evans is awarded a U.S. patent for his "steam carriage," a design that is believed by some historians to have influenced Richard Trevithick's work on early steam locomotives.

=== Births ===
==== October births ====
- October 8 – John Ruggles, awarded U.S. patent 1 for improved driving wheels (died 1874).

==== Unknown date births ====
- Gridley Bryant, inventor of many basic railroad technologies including track and wheels (died 1867)

== See also ==
- Years in rail transport

Preceded by 1770s in rail transport	Rail transport timeline 1780s	Succeeded by 1790s in rail transport
