= 1760s in rail transport =

- 1750s
- 1760s in rail transport
- 1770s

Rail transport timeline

This article lists events relating to rail transport that occurred during the 1760s.

== 1763 ==
=== Births ===
==== December births ====
- December 28 – John Molson, established the Champlain and Saint Lawrence Railroad, the first railway into Canada (died 1836).

== 1765 ==
=== Births ===
==== Unknown date births ====
- Matthew Murray, English steam engine manufacturer (died 1826).

== 1767 ==
=== Events ===
- The first ever cast iron rails are laid at Coalbrookdale.
- Kambarka Engineering Works, now recognised for its rolling stock and locomotives, opens in current-day Urmdurt, Russia.
- Plans are drawn up for the construction of a canal between Witton Park and Stockton-on-Tees which instead becomes the route of the Stockton and Darlington Railway

=== Births ===
==== May births ====
- May 31 – Edward Pease, first owner of the Stockton and Darlington Railway (died 1858).

== See also ==
- Years in rail transport

Preceded by 1750s in rail transport	Rail transport timeline 1760s	Succeeded by 1770s in rail transport
