= 1770s in rail transport =

- 1760s
- 1770s in rail transport
- 1780s

Rail transport timeline

This article lists events relating to rail transport that occurred during the 1770s.

== 1771 ==
=== Births ===
==== April births ====
- April 13 – Richard Trevithick, English inventor and steam locomotive builder (died 1833).

==== June births ====
- June 13 – William James, English railway promoter (died 1837).

== See also ==
- Years in rail transport

Preceded by 1760s in rail transport	Rail transport timeline 1770s	Succeeded by 1780s in rail transport
