= Franz Anton von Gerstner =

German-Bohemian civil engineer, professor, and railway pioneer

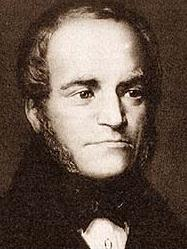
Franz Anton von Gerstner

Franz Anton Ritter von Gerstner (19 April 1796 – 12 April 1840) was a civil engineer, professor and railway pioneer born in the Kingdom of Bohemia in what was then the Habsburg monarchy.

== Career ==
The son of physicist and railway pioneer Franz Josef Gerstner, Franz Anton von Gerstner studied engineering, philosophy, technology, and mechanical engineering at the Polytechnic in Prague. Gerstner studied at the University of Prague and then the Standing Technical Institute at Prague, which his father helped found and then in 1817, Franz Anton taught engineering at the Vienna Polytechnic Institute.

From 1820, Gerstner worked with his father on the pioneering project of the Budweis–Linz section of a Danube–Vltava railway and, in 1822, made his first trip to England to study railway construction. In 1824, he resigned his professorship in accordance with his contract and became construction manager for the Budweis–Linz–Gmunden Horse-Drawn Railway. In this capacity, Gerstner made a second study trip to England in 1826/27. In 1828, he left the construction because of growing differences of opinion with the operating company's shareholders on the construction process, which was becoming more costly than planned. The railway line was completed by Matthias von Schönerer and opened on 1 August 1832.

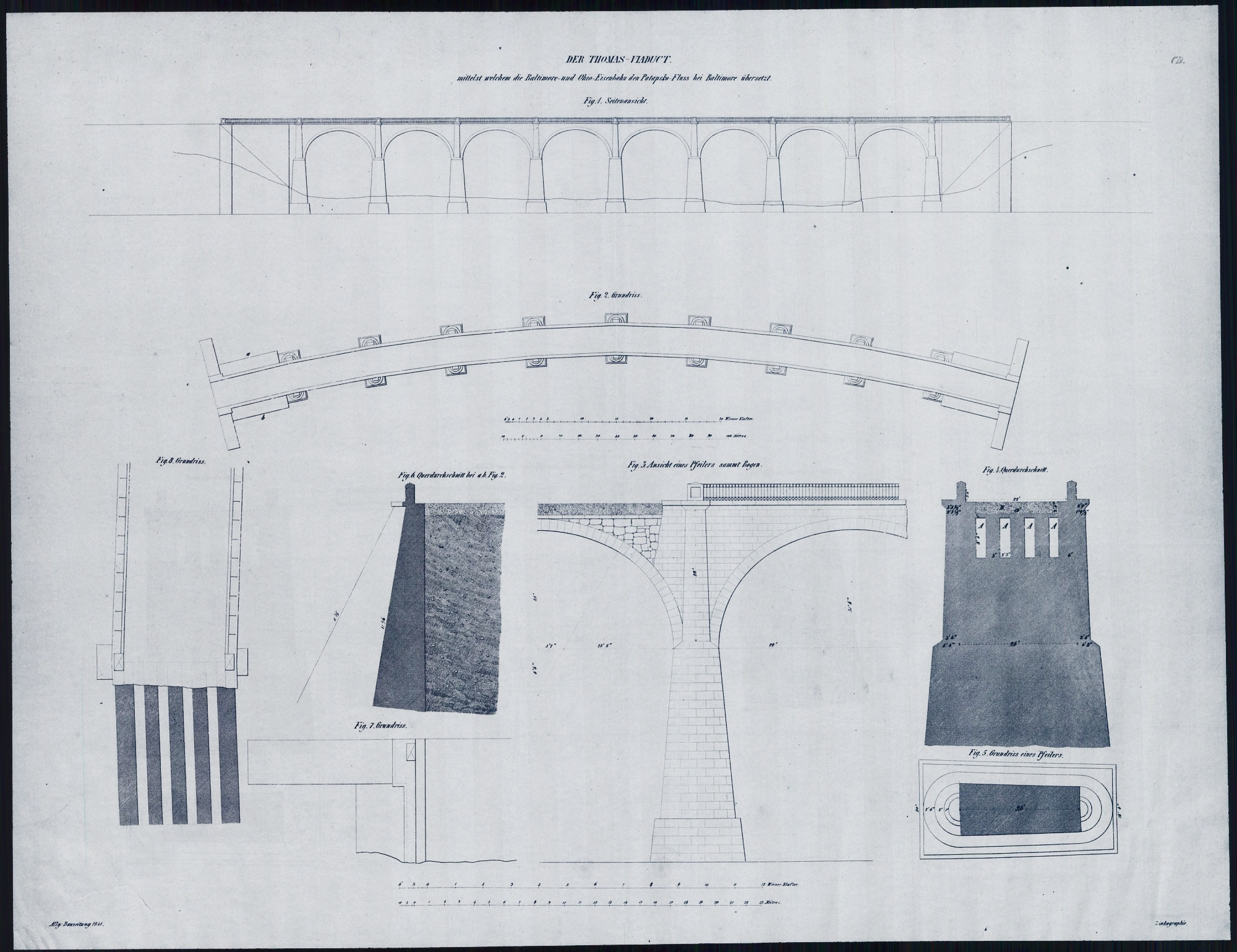
1843 Gerstner drawing of Thomas Viaduct of the Baltimore and Ohio Railroad in the United States

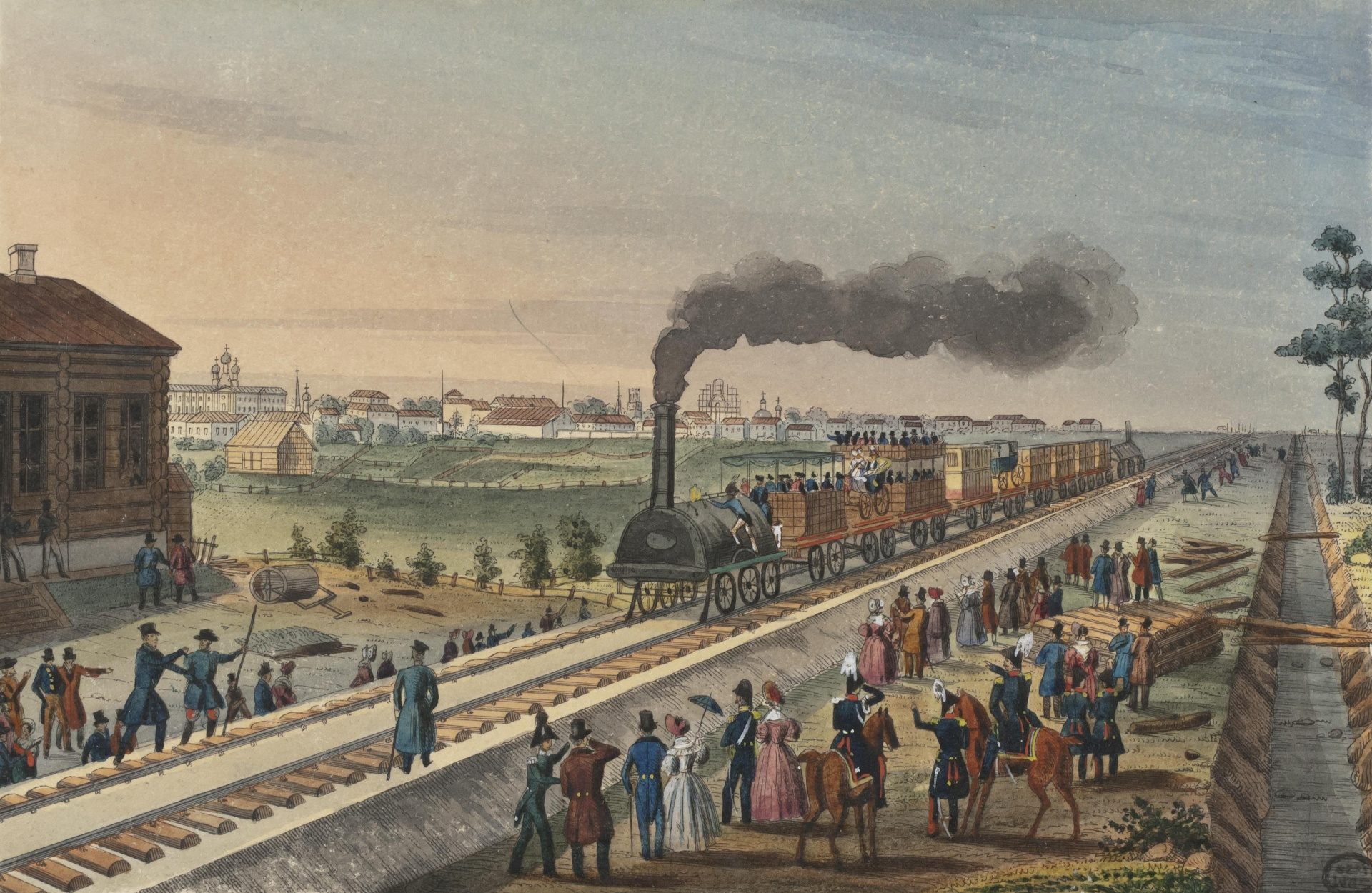
Opening of Tsarskoye Selo Railway in 1837

In 1829, Gerstner undertook a third study trip to England and, in 1834, became the planning officer for several railway lines in the Russian Empire, where in 1836/37, he constructed the Tsarskoye Selo Railway, which opened from Saint Petersburg on 30 October 1837. From 1838, Gerstner studied the North American railway system on behalf of representatives of the Russian tsarist court and in his own interest. One of the sites that he visited was the Thomas Viaduct in Baltimore, Maryland.

== Personal life ==
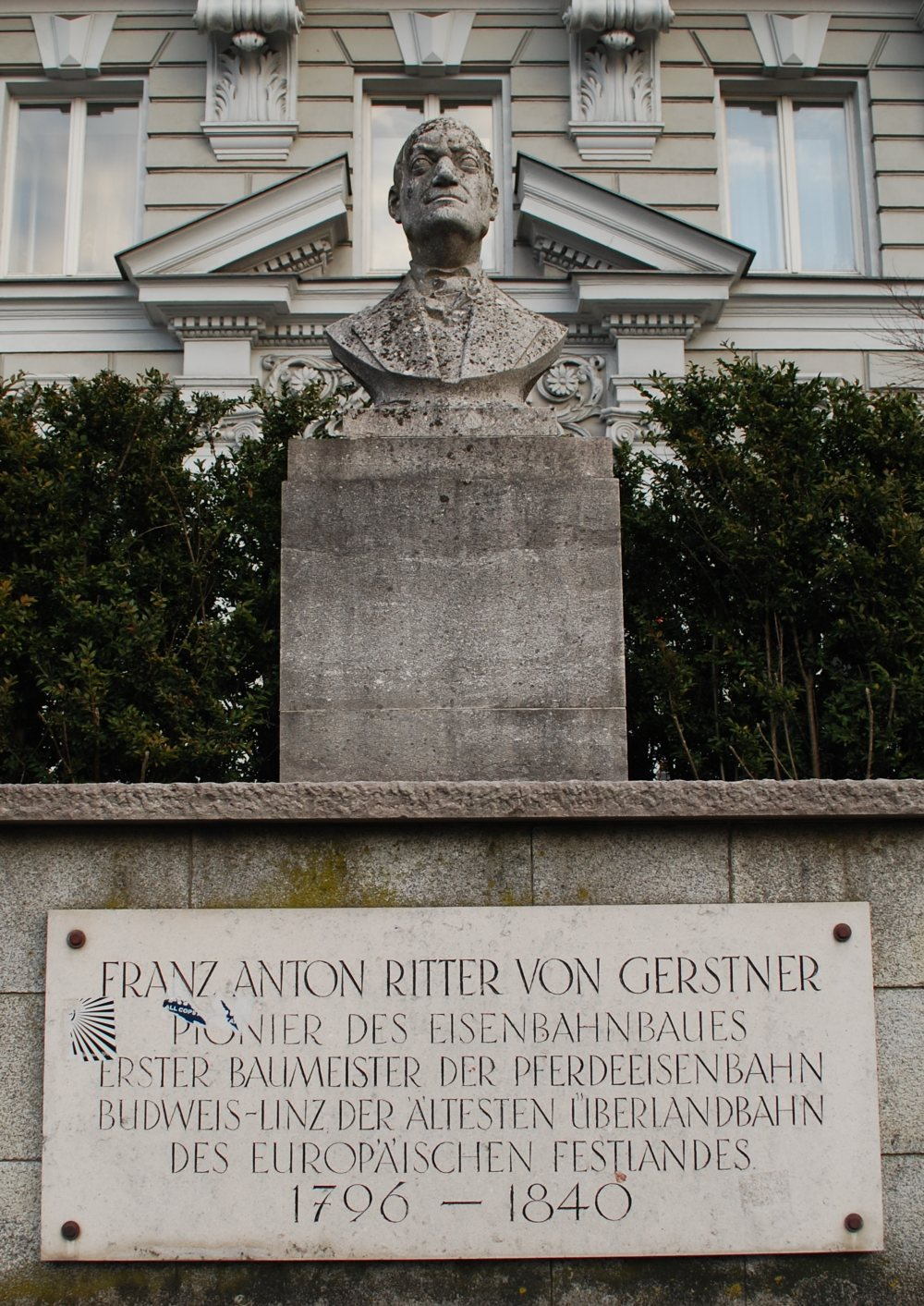
Memorial in Linz

Gertner was born on 11 May 1796 in Prague. His first marriage was to Marquise Josefine von Lambolin (Lambelin) (1805–1835). His second was to Klara (1813–after 1881), daughter of Friedrich von Epple (1782–1848), a public official in Frankfurt am Main, and she gave birth to their daughter Philadelphia von Gerstner in 1839. He died shortly before his 44th birthday on 12 April 1840 in Philadelphia, Pennsylvania, United States.

In 1903, Gerstnerstraße in Vienna was named after him.

== Technical achievement ==
The technical achievement of Franz Anton von Gerstner mainly consists of giving a clear rejection of the "inclined plane system" (with a cable for overcoming large differences in gradient) favored by English engineers like George Stephenson on his first trip to England (1822). Inspired by road construction, he pleaded for a technically integrated railway system. In his opinion, a railroad should pay special attention to even gradients, which can be achieved through the strategic installation of embankments or cuts and viaducts.

Gerstner is, therefore, to be regarded as the forefather of the mountain railway, all the more so as he actually built one in the shape of the Budweis–Linz–Gmunden railway, but as he had left its construction before completion, his performance was initially not publicly recognized. However, it was abandoned during the modernization of the railway (1869–1872/73). Today only remains (e.g., the Great Edlbrucker Bridge) are preserved as relics. Years later, Carl Ritter von Ghega expressed the same planning idea and implemented it on the Semmering railway with publicly recognized success.

In England, a country that was progressive in railroad construction at the time, the planning companies finally moved away from inclined planes. Gerstner's great technical and theoretical merit is only briefly mentioned in recent literature; an exception is the publication Die Erste (österreichische) Eisenbahngesellschaft und ihr Netz (2008) by Elmar Oberegger.

== Publications ==
- Lehrgegenstände der praktischen Geometrie am polytechnischen Institut, Prag, 1818.
- Über die Vortheile der Anlage einer Eisenbahn zwischen der Moldau und Donau. Wien, 1824.
- Bericht an die P.T. Herren Actionärs über den Stand der k. k. privilegierten Eisenbahn-Unternehmung zwischen der Moldau und Donau, vom Bauführer Franz Anton Ritter von Gerstner. Wien, Dezember 1827.
- Über die Vortheile der Unternehmung einer Eisenbahn zwischen der Moldau und Donau. Wien, Februar 1829.
- Handbuch der Mechanik. von Franz Joseph Ritter von Gerstner. Aufgesetzt, mit Beitr. von neuern englischen Konstruktionen vermehrt u. hrsg. von Franz Anton Ritter von Gerstner. Wien 1831–1834.
- Bericht über den Stand der Unternehmung der Eisenbahn von St. Petersburg nach Zarskoje Selo. 1838.
- Berichte aus den Vereinigten Staaten von Nordamerica, über Eisenbahnen, Dampfschiffahrten, Banken und andere öffentliche Unternehmungen. C. P. Melzer, Leipzig 1839.
- Die innern Communicationen der Vereinigten Staaten von Nordamerika. Wien 1842–1843.
