= Matthias von Schönerer =

Austrian engineer

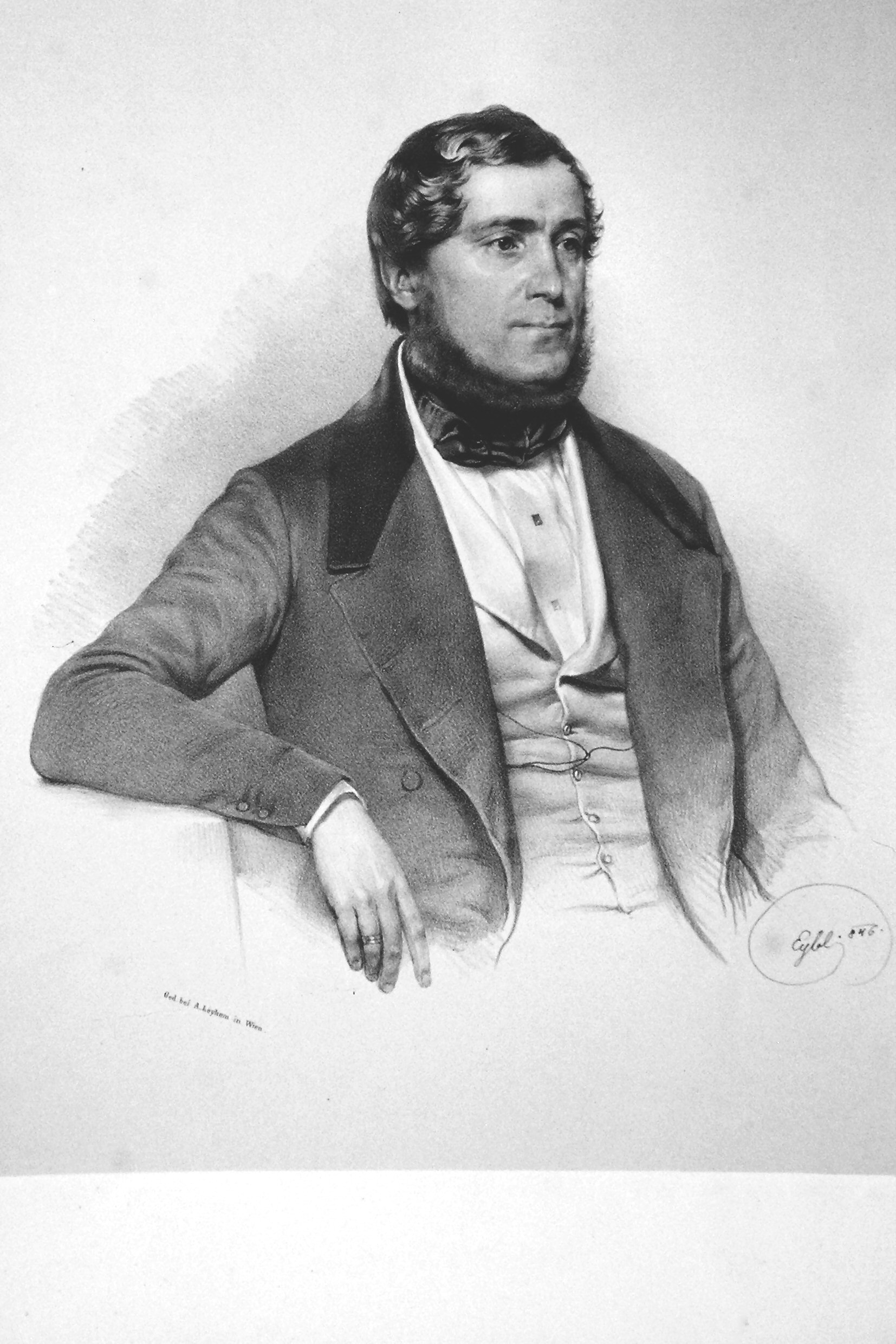
Mathias Schönerer, lithograph by Franz Eybl, 1846

Mathias Ritter von Schönerer (9 January 1807 – 30 October 1881) was an Austrian engineer. He was one of the most important railway pioneers in Austria. He built the Südrampe or South Ramp on the Budweis–Linz–Gmunden Horse-Drawn Railway and its extension to Gmunden by the Traunsee lake. Following that, he was responsible for the construction of the Austrian Southern Railway or Südbahn from Vienna to Gloggnitz.

After the dismissal of Franz Anton von Gerstner, Mathias Schönerer completed the first railway on continental Europe, the horse-drawn Budweis–Linz–Gmunden wagonway, despite financial and technical difficulties. In 1841 he was responsible for the construction of the first Austrian railway tunnel (165 m) at Gumpoldskirchen, whose northern portal bears Schönerer's motto Recta sequi in large antiqua letters.

He was the construction and operations director of the Vienna–Gloggnitz Railway (Wien–Gloggnitzer Bahn or WGB) and in 1839 founded the repair shop near the WGB's Vienna station, later the Lokomotivfabrik der StEG.

During the 1848–49 war he organised the first transportation for the military by train.

From 1856 he was on the governing board of the Empress Elisabeth Railway, from 1867 that of the Emperor Franz Joseph Railway.

For his services to railway construction he was elevated to the Austrian nobility in 1860 by Emperor Franz Joseph which entitled him and his descendants to the style of Ritter von in the case of male and von in the case of female offspring.

Mathias von Schönerer was the father of the German politician Georg von Schönerer and the actress Alexandrine von Schönerer.

He died on 30 October 1881 in his birthplace of Vienna in Austria.

== See also ==
- List of railway pioneers
