= Georg Ritter von Schönerer =

Austrian politician (1842–1921)

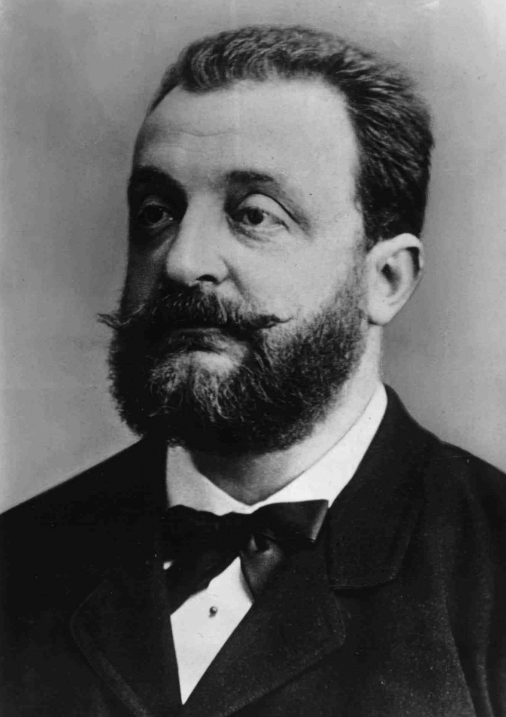
- Portrait, c. 1900

Member of the Imperial Council
- Incumbent
- Assumed office 1873
- Succeeded by: 17 July 1842 – 14 August 1921

Personal details
- Born: 17 July 1842 Vienna, Austrian Empire
- Died: 14 August 1921 (aged 79) near Zwettl, Austria
- Citizenship: Austria; Germany
- Party: Deutschliberale Partei

Georg Ritter von Schönerer (17 July 1842 – 14 August 1921) was an Austrian landowner and politician of Austria-Hungary active in the late 19th and early 20th centuries. A major exponent of pan-Germanism and German nationalism in Austria, Schönerer endorsed the annexation of German-Austrians and Austria to Germany in an Anschluss.

Schönerer was a radical opponent of political Catholicism and a fierce antisemite who exerted much influence on the young Adolf Hitler. He was known for a generation as the most radical pan-German nationalist in Austria.

== Life and career ==
=== Early life ===
Schönerer was born in Vienna as Georg Heinrich Schönerer. His father, the wealthy railroad pioneer Matthias Schönerer (1807–1881), was an employee of the House of Rothschild who was knighted (adding the hereditary title of Ritter, "Knight", and the nobiliary particle of von) by Emperor Franz Joseph in 1860. His wife was a great-granddaughter of Rabbi Samuel Löb Kohen, who died at Pohořelice in 1832. He had a younger sister, Alexandrine, later director of the Theater an der Wien, who strongly rejected her brother's politics.

From 1861, Georg studied agronomy at the universities of Tübingen, Hohenheim and Magyaróvár (Ungarisch-Altenburg, today a campus of the University of West Hungary). He then conducted the business affairs of his father's estate at Rosenau near Zwettl in the rural Waldviertel region of Lower Austria, where he became known as a generous patriarch of the local peasants and great benefactor.

Shaken by Austria's defeat in the 1866 Austro-Prussian War, the dissolution of the German Confederation, and the foundation of the German Empire in 1871, Schönerer became a political activist and ardent admirer of the German Chancellor Otto von Bismarck. He wrote passionately admiring letters to Bismarck, and continued doing so even after Bismarck made clear that he rejected any sort of Austro-German nationalism and would not allow Austria's pan-Germans to jeopardize the Dual Alliance.

=== Entering parliament ===
During the Panic of 1873, Schönerer was elected to Cisleithanian Austria’s Imperial Council as a liberal representative, but became a more and more extreme and vocal German nationalist as his career progressed. He became widely known for his oratory and was considered a firebrand in Parliament. He broke with his party three years later, agitating against "Jewish" capitalism, against the Catholic Imperial House of Habsburg, and against the Austro-Hungarian occupation of Bosnia and Herzegovina in 1878, which he condemned as a betrayal of ethnic German interests. In a speech, he said, "More and more, and ever more loudly, one can hear the German crown provinces exclaim: If only we already belonged to the German Reich and were finally rid of Bosnia and its entourage!"

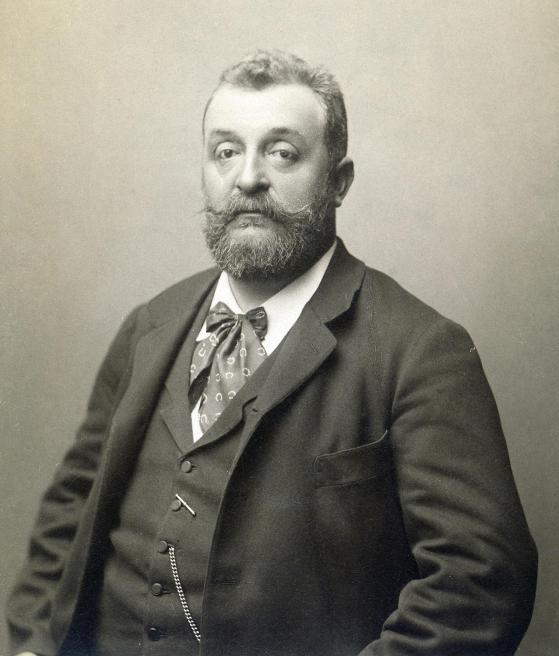
Georg Ritter von Schönerer, c. 1893

Tensions rose even further in 1879 due to the accession of minister-president Eduard Taaffe, a member of the Austrian nobility of Irish descent and whose Catholic, monarchist, and pro-minority policies so enraged Schönerer and his followers that they accused Taafe of being "anti-German."

In 1882 Schönerer, Viktor Adler, and Heinrich Friedjung, drafted the Linz Program, which they proudly called "not liberal, not clerical, but national", of the Austro-German national movement, which became a major force in Imperial politics.

The framers proposed either complete autonomy for the non-German-speaking Crownlands of Galicia, Bukovina, and Dalmatia or ceding all three to the Kingdom of Hungary. They further demanded that Austria's union with Hungary be reduced to having a common monarch, with no other administrative or legislative consequences. Additionally, German was to remain the sole official language of Austria, the Czech people in Bohemia and Moravia were to be coercively Germanized, and a Customs union, which was to be added to the constitution, was to strengthen ties between Austria and the German Empire ruled by the House of Hohenzollern.

Ironically, this manifesto fit in very well with the dreams of Polish, Hungarian and Croatian nationalists. The anti-Slavic inclinations of the framers, however, are well represented in the following excerpt from their manifesto: "We protest against all attempts to convert Austria into a Slavic state. We shall continue to agitate for the maintenance of German as the official language and to oppose the extension of federalism ... [W]e are steadfast supporters of the alliance with Germany and the foreign policy now being followed by the empire."

=== Adoption of antisemitism ===
During the 1880s, Schönerer came to consider his struggle for the German-Austrians a fight against the Jews. By the peak of his career, he had transformed into a far-right politician. Schönerer developed a political philosophy that featured elements of a violent racial opposition to Jews that disregarded religious affiliations. His campaigning became especially vocal upon the arrival of Jewish refugees during the Russian Empire's pogroms, starting in 1881. He fiercely denounced the influence of "exploitative international Jews" and in 1885 had an Aryan paragraph added to the Linz program, which led to the ultimate breach between him and Adler and Friedjung.

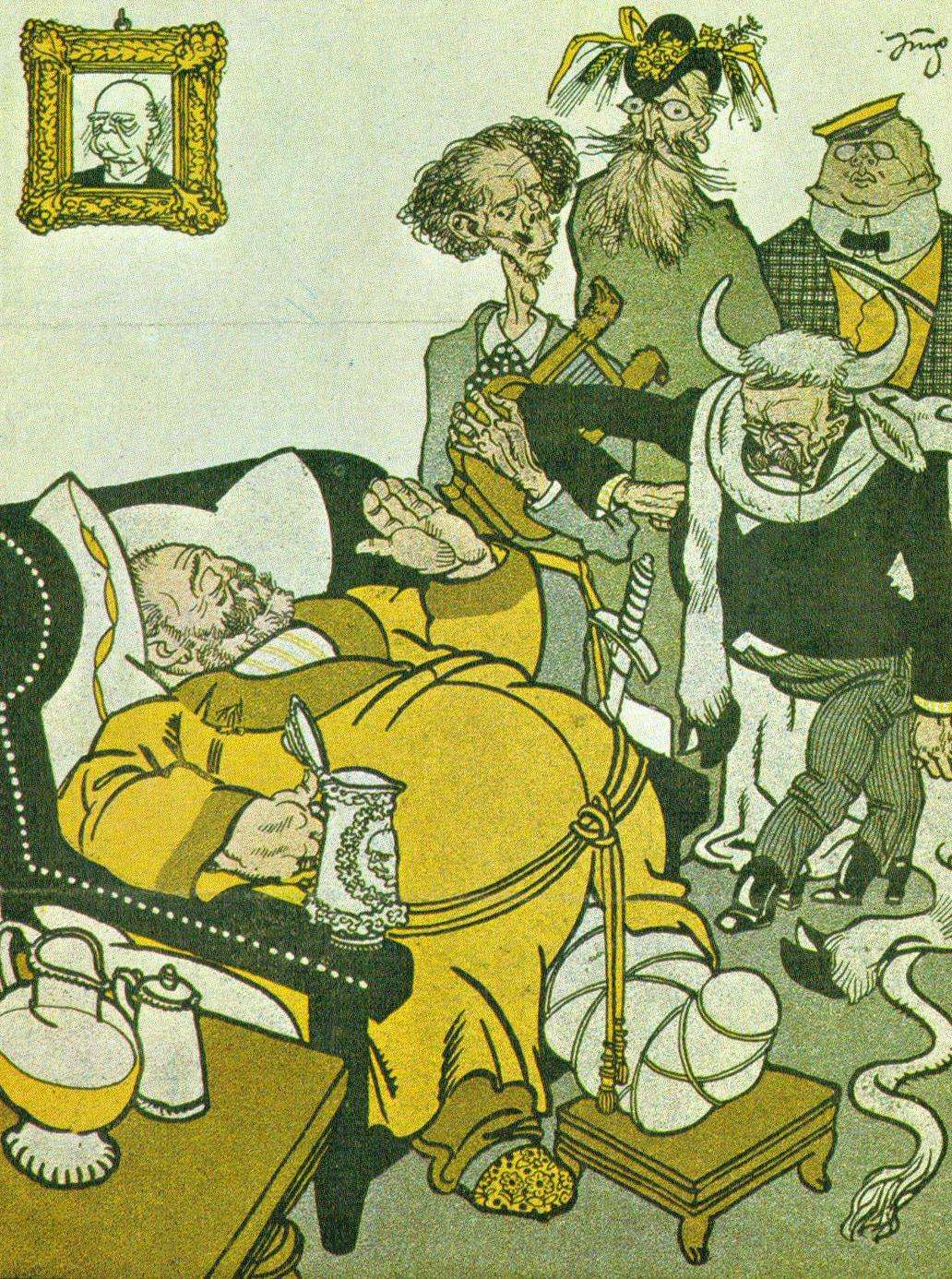
Schönerer was imprisoned for his raid on a newspaper office. While doing so, he allegedly was drunk, hence this caricature.

Schönerer's approach became the model for German national Burschenschaften (student fraternities) and numerous associations in Cisleithanian Austria. In turn, Jewish activists like Theodor Herzl began to adopt the idea of Zionism. Schönerer's authoritarianism, popular solidarism, nationalism, pan-Germanism, anti-Slavism, and anti-Catholicism appealed to many Viennese, mostly working-class. This appeal made him a powerful political figure in Austria, and he considered himself leader of the German Austrians. Defying the Austrian education ministry's prohibition of pan-German symbols in schools and colleges, Schönerer urged German Austrians to wear blue cornflowers (known to be the favourite flower of German Emperor William I) in their buttonholes, along with cockades in the German national colours (black, red, and yellow), as a way to show pride in their German identity and dismissal of the multi-ethnic Austro-Hungarian Empire. Like many other Austrian pan-Germans, Schönerer hoped for the dissolution of the Austro-Hungarian Empire and an Anschluss with Germany.

Schönerer's movement had various strict criteria: it only allowed its members to be Germans; none of the members could have relatives or friends who were Jews or Slavs, and before any member could marry, they had to prove "Aryan" descent and be checked for health defects. Other pan-German movements generally followed suit by expelling Jews and generally Slavs as well.

Schönerer was addressed by his supporters as the "Führer," and he and his followers also used the "Heil" greeting, mannerisms Hitler and the Nazis later adopted. Schönerer and his followers often met during the summer and winter to celebrate German history and listen to German battle songs. Schönerer told his followers to prepare for a battle between Germans and Jews; he said, "If we don't expel the Jews, we Germans will be expelled!"

In 1888, Schönerer was temporarily imprisoned for ransacking a Jewish-owned newspaper office and assaulting its employees for prematurely reporting the imminent death of the German emperor Wilhelm I. His attack increased his popularity and helped members of his party get elected to the Austrian Parliament. Nevertheless, the prison sentence also resulted not only in the loss of his status as a noble, but also of his mandate in parliament. Schönerer was not reelected to the Imperial Council until 1897, while rivals like the Vienna mayor Karl Lueger and his Christian Social Party took the chance created by his disfavor to get ahead.

Schönerer left the Catholic Church in January 1900, and converted to the Lutheran denomination.

=== End of career in politics ===
In 1897, Schönerer helped orchestrate the expulsion of Minister-President of Cisleithania Kasimir Felix Graf Badeni from office. Badeni had proclaimed that civil servants in Austrian-controlled Bohemia must know the Czech language, an ordinance that prevented many Bohemian ethnic German speakers, most of whom did not speak Czech, from applying for government jobs. Schönerer staged mass protests against the ordinance and disrupted parliamentary proceedings, actions that eventually led Emperor Franz Joseph to dismiss Badeni.

During these years, while the Kulturkampf divided Imperial Germany, Schönerer founded the Los von Rom! ("Away from Rome!") movement, which advocated the conversion of all Roman Catholic German-speaking people of Austria to Lutheran Protestantism, or, in some cases, to the Old Catholic Churches. Schönerer became even more powerful in 1901, when 21 members of his party gained seats in the Parliament. But his influence and career rapidly declined thereafter due to his forceful views and personality. His party also suffered, and had virtually disintegrated by 1907. But his views and philosophy, not to mention his great skill as an agitator, influenced and inspired Hitler and the Nazi Party.

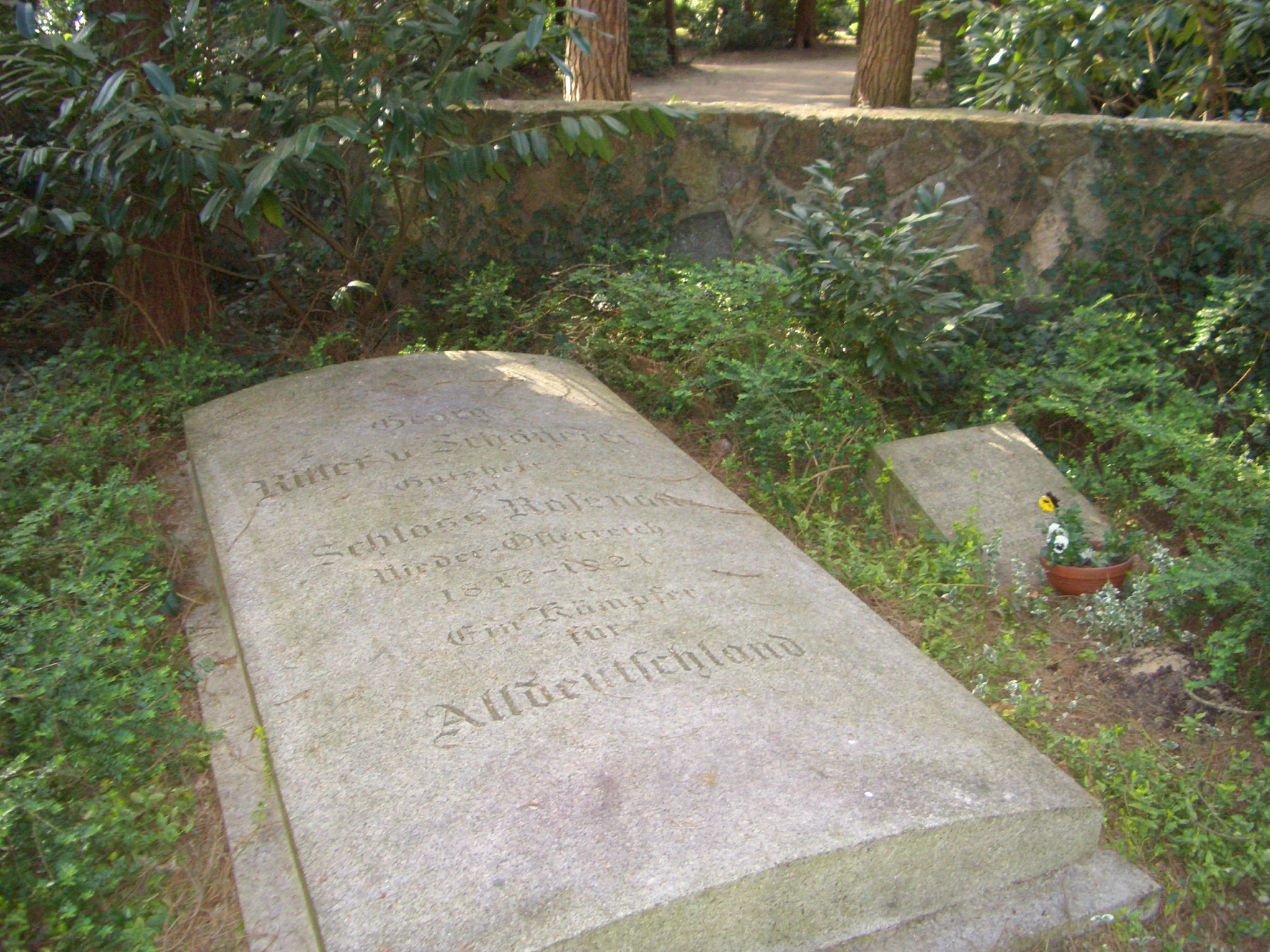
Schönerer's grave in Aumühle, Schleswig-Holstein, Germany

=== Death ===
Schönerer died at his Rosenau manor near Zwettl, Lower Austria on 14 August 1921. He had arranged to be buried near Bismarck's mausoleum on his estate at Friedrichsruh, Lauenburg, in present-day Schleswig-Holstein, northern Germany.

== Influence on Hitler and National Socialism ==
In Austria-Hungary, at the time of Schönerer, German-speaking inhabitants were the minority. Three quarters of the population consisted of other peoples such as Hungarians, Czechs, Poles, Serbs, and Croats. Fear of “Überfremdung” led some German speakers to wish that Austria should join the – same-language – German Empire.

Schönerer’s activities were also evident in the founding of the “Neuen Richard-Wagner-Vereins”, in order to “free German art from falsification and Judaization”. He expressed propaganda slogans such as “The person matured under a cooler sky also has the duty to exterminate the parasitic races, just as one must exterminate dangerous venomous snakes and wild predators,” or slogans like “Whether Jew or Christian is all the same – the filth lies in the race.”

Schönerer demanded the removal of Jews from the civil service, from schools, universities, associations, and newspapers. In 1888, the year he served his prison sentence, he submitted an “Antisemitic Petition”:

In the district we inhabit […] a national transformation is gradually beginning to take place, as not only Slavic but also Jewish infiltration is increasing, and even positions of an official character have repeatedly been filled by Jews, which has extended in the most striking way even into the ranks of the gendarmerie in the Waldviertel […] Through Slavdom the German character of our region could be threatened; through Jewry the danger is even greater, for this oriental people seeks to denationalize our native population.

— Friedrich Polleroß, Die Erinnerung tut zu weh

On 10 October 1920, Hitler gave an NSDAP assembly speech in the Waldviertel, in the cinema hall Gmünd, against the Treaty of Versailles, against the so-called Zinsknechtschaft (Interest slavery) and against the Weimar Republic.

In the National Council election of 1930, the NSDAP already achieved 10 percent in the Waldviertel. After the municipal elections held at the end of 1932, National Socialist mayors governed in Stein, Zwettl, Gmünd, and Krems.

In 1942, the National Socialist Rudolf Lochner wrote about the nationally and socially minded role model:

To engage with Schönerer is to pursue Greater German history. Schönerer, one of the most passionate Germans who ever lived, is the greatest German political educator after Bismarck and before Adolf Hitler.

— Rudolf Lochner, Georg von Schönerer, ein Erzieher zu Großdeutschland

The National Socialist writer Otto Henke also emphasized this connection:

The ancestral homeland of the Führer was turned by Georg Ritter von Schönerer into the spiritual homeland of the bitter struggle against Jewry.

— Wolfgang Zdral, Die Hitlers. Die unbekannte Familie des Führers.

After the Second World War, Schönerer’s influence on Hitler was not forgotten. Hannah Arendt described Schönerer as Hitler’s “spiritual father”.

== Bibliography ==
- Childers, Thomas (2017). The Third Reich: A History of Nazi Germany. New York: Simon & Schuster. ISBN 978-1-45165-113-3.
- Evans, Richard (2005). The Coming of the Third Reich. New York: Penguin. ISBN 978-0-14303-469-8.
- Giloi, Eva (2013). Monarchy, Myth, and Material Culture in Germany 1750–1950. New York: Cambridge University Press. ISBN 978-1-107675407.
- Hamann, Brigitte (2010). Hitler's Vienna: A Portrait of the Tyrant as a Young Man. Tauris Parke Paperbacks. ISBN 978-1-84885-277-8.
- Schorske, Carl E. (1980). Fin-de-Siècle Vienna: Politics and Culture. New York: Random House. ISBN 978-0-394-74478-0.
- Unowsky, Daniel L. (2005). The Pomp and Politics of Patriotism: Imperial Celebrations in Habsburg Austria, 1848–1916. West Lafayette, IN: Purdue University Press. ISBN 978-1-557534002.
- Whiteside, Andrew G. (1975). The Socialism of Fools: Georg Ritter von Schönerer and Austrian Pan-Germanism. Berkeley, CA: University of California Press. ISBN 978-0-52002-434-2.
- Newspaper clippings about Georg Ritter von Schönerer in the 20th Century Press Archives of the ZBW
