= Alexandrine von Schönerer =

Austrian actress and theatre director (1850–1919)

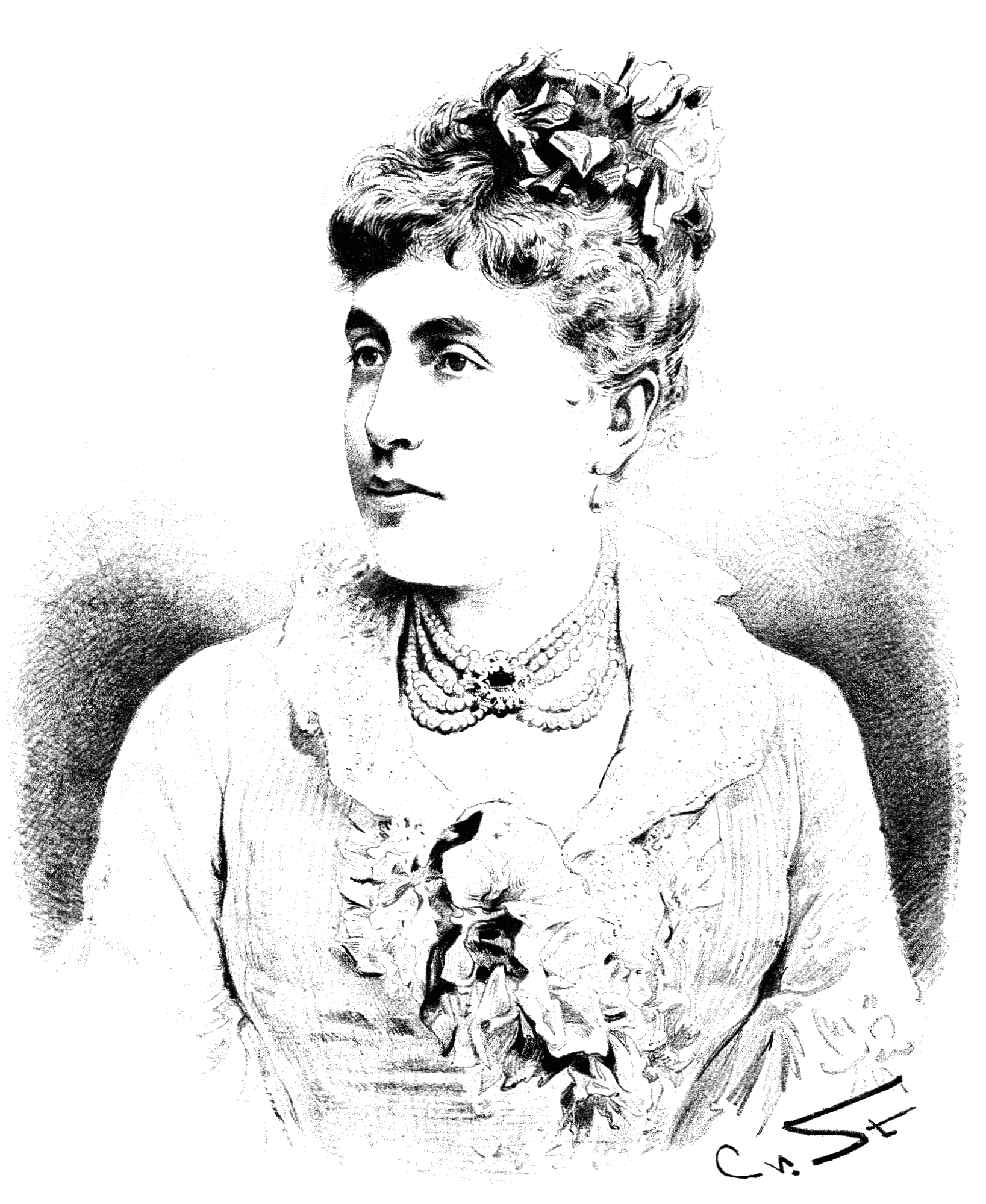
- "Fräulein von Schönerer" by Carl von Stur (Der Floh, 29 June 1884)
- Occupations: actress, theater owner

Alexandrine von Schönerer (15 June 1850 – 28 November 1919) née Lucia was an Austrian theater owner, managing director and actress.

== Life and career ==
Schönerer was born in Vienna. Her father, Matthias von Schönerer (1807–1881), was a wealthy railroad pioneer in the employ of the Rothschilds. He was knighted by Emperor Franz Joseph in 1860. She had an older brother, Georg Ritter von Schönerer, who’s attitudes she repudiated.

Schönerer had acting training with August Förster (1828–1889) In 1875 at the Stadttheater Baden, she played the part of Countess Orsina in Lessing's "Emilia Galotti".

Schönerer became managing director of the Theater an der Wien from 1889 to 1905 after the lease ended in 1884 between her and the librettist Camillo Walzel. Under her direction, several operas were premiered including The Bartered Bride (1893), Königskinder (1897) and La Bohème.

According to an old agreement between Schönerer, the publisher Emil Berté and the librettists Bernhard Buchbinder and Alfred Maria Willner, Johann Strauss II composed his operetta Die Göttin der Vernunft, a French revolutionary comedy. The operetta premiered on March 13, 1897 and was presented 36 times.

On 17 March 1900, Schönerer sold the theater to Leon Dorer, Baron Emil Kubinsky and Josef Edler von Simon.

In 1898, Schönerer was caricatured, among others, with Johann Strauss on a picture by Theo Zasche (1862-1922) in Le Figaro.

Schönerer always distanced herself from the antisemitism of her brother Georg von Schonerer.

== Notes ==
- Bauer, Anton (1952). 150 Jahre Theater an der Wien (in German). Zürich, Leipzig, Vienna. OCLC 882464831.
