= Franz Josef Gerstner =

Czech-German physicist and mathematician (1756–1832)

Franz Josef von Gerstner
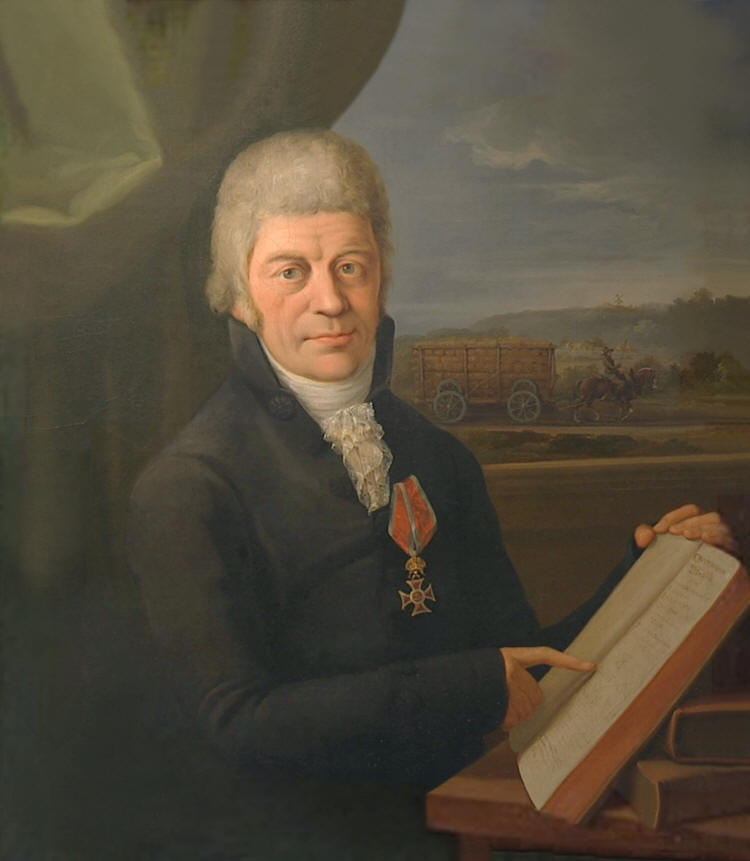
- Born: Franz Josef Gerstner; 23 February 1756; Chomutov, Bohemia, Habsburg monarchy
- Died: 25 July 1832 (aged 76); Mladějov, Bohemia, Austrian Empire
- Education: University of Prague
- Children: Franz Anton von Gerstner
- Awards: Imperial Order of Leopold
- Scientific career
- Notable students: Bernard Bolzano

Franz Josef von Gerstner (Czech: František Josef Gerstner; 23 February 1756 – 25 July 1832) was a Czech-German physicist, astronomer and engineer.

== Life ==
Gerstner was born in Chomutov in Bohemia then part of the Habsburg monarchy (now in the Czech Republic). He was the son of Florian Gerstner (1730–1783) and Maria Elisabeth, born Englert. He studied at the Jesuits gymnasium in Chomutov. After that he studied mathematics and astronomy at the Faculty of Arts at the Charles-Ferdinand University in Prague between 1772 and 1777. In 1781, he started to study medicine at the University of Vienna, but later decided to quit his studies. Instead, he worked as an assistant at the astronomical observatory in Vienna under supervision of Maximilian Hell. In 1784 he returned to Prague, where he got a position at the Clementinum astronomical observatory in Prague. In 1789, he became professor of higher mathematics, mechanics and hydraulics at the university in Prague.

In 1792, Gerstner married Gabriele von Mayersbach (died 1808). They had nine children including Franz Anton von Gerstner (1796–1840).

In 1795, Gerstner became a member of the government commission which tried to improve higher technical education in the Habsburg monarchy. Following his suggestion, the old engineering school in Prague (Czech: Česká stavovská inženýrská škola) was converted by the decree of Emperor Joseph I to a polytechnic school in 1803. The new Polytechnic Institute in Prague was officially opened on 10 November 1806, and Gerstner became its first director. In 1811, he was appointed by the Emperor to the position of the Director of hydraulic engineering in Bohemia.

In 1823, due to an illness, he was forced to stop his classes at the university. Gerstner died and was buried in Mladějov, Bohemia, in 1832.

== Work ==
From his works the most influential was Handbook of mechanics (German: Handbuch der Mechanik). This fundamental text-book was published in three volumes (1831, 1832 and 1834), with more than 1400 subscribers.

In 1804, Gerstner published a pioneering work Theory of water waves. The so-called Gerstner wave is the trochoidal wave solution for periodic water waves – the first correct and nonlinear theory of water waves in deep water, appearing even before the first correct linearised theory.

His work focused on applied mechanics, hydrodynamics and river transportation. He helped to build the first iron works and first steam engine in Bohemia.

In 1807, he proposed the construction of a horse-drawn railway between the Austrian Empire towns of České Budějovice and Linz, one of the first railways on the European continent. The construction of this railway was started in summer 1825 by his son Franz Anton von Gerstner. The regular transport between České Budějovice and Linz started on 1 August 1832.

== Honours ==
Between 1802 and 1803, Gerstner served as a chairman of the Royal Bohemian Society of Sciences.

In 1808, he received the Imperial Order of Leopold. In 1810, Gerstner was elevated to the nobility as Ritter von Gerstner.

== Legacy ==
The polytechnic school founded by Gerstner still exists today as the Czech Technical University in Prague (ČVUT).

The institute for artificial intelligence and cybernetics research at ČVUT bears the name Gerstner Laboratory.

== Writings ==
- Über die Bestimmung der geographischen Längen, Berichtigung der Längen von Marseille, Padua, Kremsmünster, Dresden, Berlin und Danzig, Prague 1785
- Vorübergang des Merkur vor der Sonne. Beobachtet am 4 Mai 1786, Prague and Dresden 1786
- Beobachtung der Sonnenfinsternis am 4. Juni 1788 auf der k. Sternwarte zu Prag, Prague and Dresden 1788
- Eine leichte und genaue Methode für die Berechnung der geographischen Länge aus Sonnenfinsternissen. Berlin Astronomisches Jahrbuch 1788, pp. 243–247
- Einleitung in die statische Baukunst. Prague 1789
- Merkur vor der Sonne zu Prag den 5. Nov. 1789, Prague 1790
- Vergleichung der Kraft und Last beim Räderwerke mit Rücksicht auf Reibung, Prague 1790
- As coauthor:J. Jelinek, Abbe Gruber, Th. Haenke and F.J. Gerstner, Beobachtungen auf Reisen nach dem Riesengebirge, Dresden 1791
- Über die, der wechselseitigen Anziehung des Saturns und Jupiters wegen erforderlichen Verbesserungen der Beobachtungen des Uranus, zur richtigen Erfindung der Elemente seiner wahren elyptischen Bahn, Berlin, Jahrbuch 1792
- Theorie des Wasserstosses in Schussgerinnen mit Rücksicht auf Erfahrung und Anwendung, Prague 1795
- Versuche über die Flüssigkeit des Wassers bei verschiedenen Temperaturen, Prague 1798
- Theorie der Wellen: samt einer daraus abgeleiteten theorie der deichprofile, Prague 1804
- Mechanische Theorie der oberschlächtigen Räder, Prague 1809
- Zwei Abhandlungen über Frachtwägen und Strassen, Prague 1813
- Abhandlung über die Spirallinie der Treibmaschinen, Prague 1816
- Bemerkungen über das hydrometrische Pendel, Prague 1819
- Vorschlag zur Erweiterung der von den böhmischen HH. Ständen im J. 1806 zu Prag errichteten polytechnischen Lehrinstituts, Prague 1820
- Bemerkungen über die Festigkeit, Elasticität und Anwendung des Eisens bei dem Bau der Kettenbrücken, Prague 1825
- Handbuch der Mechanik in three parts
  - 1. Mechanik fester Körper. Spurny, Prague 1831
  - 2. Mechanik flüssiger Körper. Spurny, Prague 1831
  - 3. Beschreibung und Berechnung grösserer Maschinenanlagen. Sollinger, Vienna 1834
