= Budweis–Linz–Gmunden Horse-Drawn Railway =

The Budweis–Linz–Gmunden Horse-Drawn Railway (German: Pferdeeisenbahn Budweis–Linz–Gmunden; Czech: Koněspřežná dráha České Budějovice–Linec–Gmunden) was the second public railway line to be opened in mainland Europe (after the Saint-Étienne–Andrézieux railway). It opened in stages between 1827 and 1836, and principally served the transport of salt from the Upper Austrian Salzkammergut to Bohemia.

In 1855 and 1856, the stretch between Linz and Gmunden was changed to a steam service. This switch over was not possible in the mountainous stretch between Linz and Budweis (České Budějovice) due to tight curvature radii and steep climbs. By 1873, a replacement line between Linz and České Budějovice was built, mostly along another route, and allowed for a steam service. The horse-drawn service was closed in December 1872.

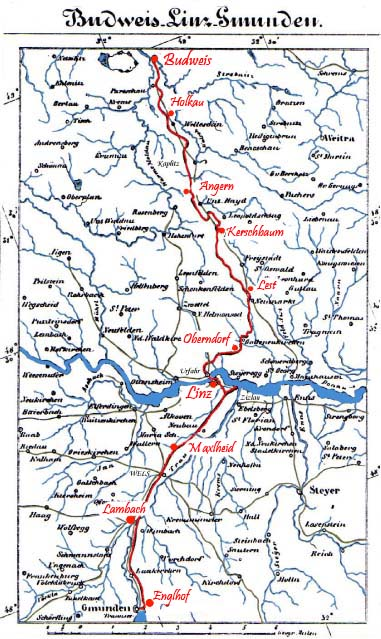
Route map with stations for the Budweis-Linz-Gmunden Horse-Drawn Railway

== Early history ==
=== The first plans ===
The salt trade between the Salzkammergut, or rather Salzburg, and the inhabitants of the Bohemian basin can be traced back to the Bronze Age. The important mineral, which was initially carried on the back, was later towed by horses along narrow mountain paths such as the Goldenen Steig (The Golden Path) or the Linzer Steig (The Linzer Path) on the Vltava River. In the Middle Ages, as the need for salt grew, roads were built. In 1530, the House of Habsburg banned the hitherto dominant salt import from the Prince-Archbishopric of Salzburg in the Austrian hereditary lands, as they wanted to promote the production from the imperial salt works in the Salzkammergut. Moreover, since the salt trade was brought under state control, the "White Gold" marketed in České Budějovice in the 17th and 18th centuries also came predominantly from the salt works at Hallstatt, Bad Ischl and Ebensee. From there it was transported by water along the Traun and the Danube to Linz and Mauthausen, where it was loaded onto horse-drawn carts of the (mostly Bohemian) Salt Farmers (Salzbauern) and taken via Freistadt to the depot at České Budějovice. With an annual transport volume of 17,000 tonnes, by the end of the 18th century there were around 350 vehicles in operation every day. From České Budějovice, most of the salt reached Prague and sometimes beyond along the cost-effective waterway via the Vltava and the Elbe.

Since transporting the product by horse-drawn wagon made the product much more expensive, there were already plans in the Middle Ages to link the Vltava and Danube with a navigable canal.

=== The possible solution ===
The reasons for the failure of the historic canal project were due not least to it being difficult to exactly calculate the costs of such a project in a mountainous region. To correct this shortcoming, the Bohemian Hydrotechnic Society (Bömische Hydrotechnische Gesellschaft) was founded in 1807, and the professor of higher mathematics in Prague, Franz Josef Ritter von Gerstner, was given the task of making more precise level calculations and presenting a solution for the route with cost estimates. After many months, Gerstner came to the conclusion that a canal system would be uneconomical, even along the most reasonable route proposed by Josef Walcher. He suggested instead to make the Vltava navigable from České Budějovice to Joachimsmühle and from there to make a railway leading to Katzbach (near Linz).

More than a decade passed before the Viennese Kommerz-Hofkommission (i.e. the Ministry of Economy) took up this transport project again. The reason for this was a petition from ten states along the Elbe, which asked the Emperor to build a Vltava-Danube canal, after they had agreed on free navigation on the Elbe. Franz Anton Ritter von Gerstner, the son of Franz Josef von Gerstner, was issued with the task of realising this project in 1820. Gestner firstly resigned from his professorship at the Vienna Polytechnic Institute. After he had familiarised himself with the conditions at the site, he took an educational trip to Great Britain in order to learn more about the latest in canal and railway construction from the then leading industrial nation. In his report to the Imperial Court, he dismissed all canal projects, just as his father had. Likewise, he suggested constructing a railway. In 1824, he requested a concession for the construction and operation of a Holz- und Eisenbahn (Wood and Iron Railway) from České Budějovice to Mauthausen, which would be granted to him for a period of 50 years. In order to generate interest in co-financing this innovative project, he published a brochure. Moreover, he had a 225m long test track erected in the Viennese Prater park, which attracted great interest from the public and the press. It also succeeded in winning the bank houses Geymüller, Sina and Stametz for the project, which led to the founding of the k.k. privilegierten Ersten Eisenbahn-Gesellschaft (lit. Imperial-Royal Privileged First Railway Company) as a joint-stock company in 1825. The company was able to raise 850,000 guilders, which was just under the estimated construction cost of 900,000 guilders. The equivalent of one guilder from that time is around 15 euros.

== Construction ==
=== The České Budějovice–Linz route ===
The groundbreaking ceremony took place at Netřebice (German: Netrowitz) on July 25, 1825, the same month as the opening of the first horse-drawn railway in France. Gerstner and the almost 6,000 workers were faced with many problems. Besides overcoming technical difficulties and negotiating a height difference of 540 metres, they had to live with resistance from the local population who, for the most part, were directly or indirectly involved in transporting salt with horse-drawn carts and were concerned about their source of income. Furthermore, there were tensions between the project leadership and the builders.

=== The Linz–Gmunden route ===
Since the maintenance of the Traun waterway for salt transportation consumed a considerable amount of resources every year, the court chancellery, in 1814, considered the construction of a shipping canal from Stadl bei Lambach to Zizlau (St. Peter, Linz) at the mouth of the Traun. However, the plan was abandoned due to the high costs, and the saltern department suggested a horse-drawn railway instead. In 1818, the k.k. Baudirektor (Construction Director) Ferdinand Mayr (1767–1832) presented a corresponding design to the state government, which would cost 285,000 guilders. However, the money necessary could not be raised.

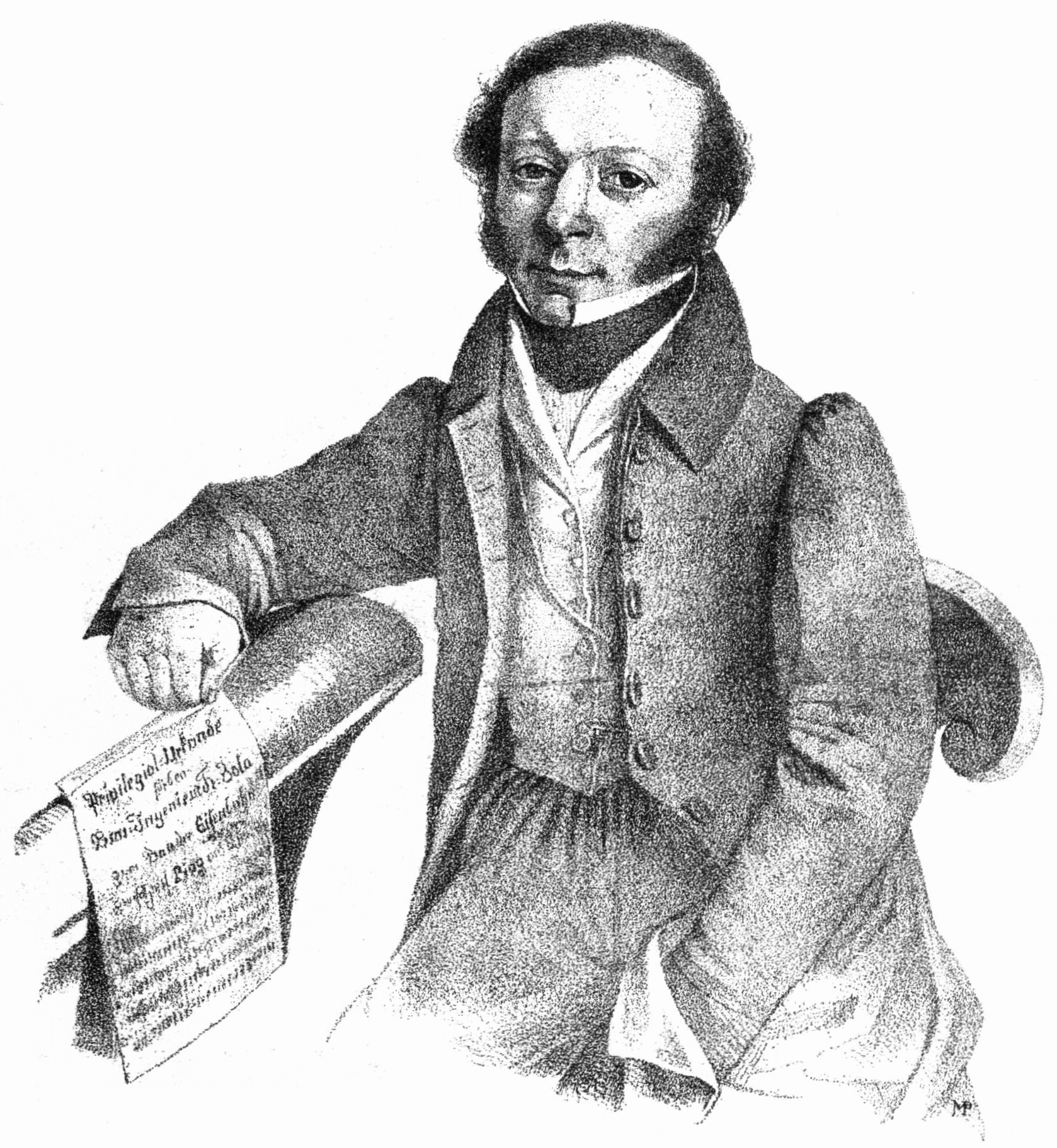
Francois Zola

In 1829, Francoise Zola (1795–1847), an engineer of Franz Anton Gerstner and the father of the author Émile Zola, was awarded the privilege of the construction of the Linz-Gmunden route.

Zola drew up the Linz-Gmunden line at his own expense, however he didn't find any financial backers within two years and so the privilege expired. Disappointed, Zola left Austria for the south of France. After this, the investors in the České Budějovice-Linz railway applied for the concession and were awarded the contract in 1833. Surveying was carried out in spring 1834, and construction began in summer of the same year.

In order to link the new line with the route to České Budějovice, tracks were laid on the wooden bridge over the Danube to Linz Hauptmauthaus in 1835. By 1836, the route to Gmunden, including a 2.5 km branch line to the port at Zizlau, was completed.

== The rail operation ==
After the official opening of the railway on August 1, 1832, traffic initially remained limited to freight operations.

The transportation of people started off with just the occasional journey. The first scheduled service began in 1834 with special trains to Urfahr for the Easter market, which carried 2379 passengers. Official approval for a passenger service came on May 10, 1836. From then, "long distance trains" left at 05:00 from both end stations. Around noon, the trains met at the highest point of the route, Kerschbaum; here, passengers had an hour to have a meal at the first train station restaurant in Europe. Passengers reached the final station at 19:00. In 1840, 10,000 passengers were transported on the railway - a number which rose to 16,000 in 1848. During passenger transit, the average speed was between 10 and 12 km/h, though it could reach up to 15 km/h on downhill stretches. Passenger trains only ran from April to October.

The triumph of steam-powered railways also inspired the Erste Eisenbahn-Gesellschaft. Since it was not possible to convert the České Budějovice-Linz route, the conversion had to be limited to the Linz-Gmunden stretch. The first test journeys in 1854 showed that the flat rails used up to that point were not able to carry the weight of steam locomotives and often broke. Nevertheless, the Gmunden line was converted to a steam service using EEG - Marchtrenk bis Zizlau locomotives. As rail breakages become more frequent during the steam service and accidents occurred, the decision was finally taken to convert from flat rails to higher rail profiles and steel sleepers.

Shallow grooved rails were also used on paved roads in the cities (Linz and České Budějovice).

== The end of the horse-drawn railway ==
The construction of the Empress Elisabeth Railway (German: Kaiserin Elisabeth-Bahn; modern-day Westbahn) led to the slow end of the horse-drawn railway.

== Traces and memorials ==
=== Museums ===
Here are some permanent memorials worth noting:

- Pferdeeisenbahnmuseum Budweis (Czech: Muzeum koněspřežky): Exhibition in an old signalman's house
- Bujanov (Angern): Small museum in a signal box
- Kerschbaum: Museum in the old station stables, with 500m rebuilt stretch of track
- Maxlhaid (Wels): Pferdeeisenbahnmuseum Bahnzeit-Stall (in an annex of the Gasthof Maxlhaid)
- The passenger car Hannibal can be seen at the Vienna Technical Museum.
- In the Deutsches Museum in Munich, there is a stand in the new Verkehrszentrum (Transport Centre) dedicated to the České Budějovice-Linz Horse-Drawn Railway, including faithfully rebuilt passenger cars, and reproduced pictures .

Besides these, there is a well-preserved station in Lest.

=== Monuments ===
In 1970, the remaining parts of the horse-drawn railway in Austria were listed as cultural monuments. In addition to dams, bridges (or bridge foundations) and routes along old tracks, there are many signal boxes as well as station sites. Of the old stations, Lest (near Kefermarkt) and Kerschbaum are well preserved. There is a museum in the restored station building in Kerschbaum.

In Linz, the Südbahnhof (South Station) has been preserved. The house at Gstöttnerhofstraße 3, also in Linz, was once a signal box. Today there is no trace of the former signal box. The Federal Monuments Office states that Signal Box 51 (Wachthaus Nr. 51) on Gstöttnerhofstraße had already been demolished by the 1970s. At the start of the Pferdebahnpromenade (Horse-Drawn Rail Promenade) is a monument to the railway, which used to be in front of the Linz Hauptbahnhof. A section of track has also been rebuilt there. The eastern abutment of the Haselgrabenviadukts has also been preserved, and a commemorative plaque has been placed there.

== Literature ==
- Roland Anzengruber: Die Pferdeeisenbahn in alten Ansichten. Verlag Europäische Bibliothek, Zaltbommel (Niederlande) 1985, ISBN 90-288-3137-1/CP.
- Peter Csendes: Österreich 1790–1948. Wien 1987.
- Bruno Enderes: Die Holz- und Eisenbahn Budweis–Linz–Gmunden. In: Die Lokomotive. February 1926, p. 21 ff., Wien 1926, anno.onb.ac.at.
- Fritz Fellner: Bemühungen in den fünfziger Jahren unseres Jahrhunderts um den Erhalt einzelner Denkmäler und Bauabschnitte der Pferdeeisenbahn. In: Oberösterreichische Heimatblätter. 53, No. 3–4, 1999, pp. 188–194, online (PDF) at Forum OoeGeschichte.at.
- Franz A. Gerstner: Über die Vortheile einer Anlage einer Eisenbahn zwischen Moldau und Donau. Wien 1824.
- Ivo Hajn: Die Pferdeeisenbahn Budweis – Linz – Gmunden. Verlagsanstalt Bohumír Němec-Veduta, České Budějovice 2006, ISBN 80-86829-16-2.
- Mathias von Schönerer: Karte Der Eisenbahn Zwischen Budweis Und Linz Zur Verbindung Der Donau Mit Der Moldau. Mannsfeld et Comp, S.L. (Wien) after 1835, online at oldmapsonline.org.
- Mathias von Schönerer (Hrsg.), Franz von Weiss (Lithograprhie): Karte der Eisenbahn zwischen Linz und Gmunden als Fortsetzung der Bahn von Budweis nach Linz. Ludwig Förster, Wien 1836.
- Pfeffer/Kleinhanns: Budweis–Linz–Gmunden. Pferdeeisenbahn und Dampfbetrieb auf 1106 mm Spurweite. Verlag Slezak, Wien 1982, ISBN 3-85416-082-8 and OÖ Landesverlag, Linz 1982, ISBN 3-85214-373-X.
- Elmar Oberegger: Der Eiserne Weg nach Böhmen. Von der Pferde-Eisenbahn zur Summerauer Bahn. In: Oberösterreichische Landesausstellung in Ampflwang (Hrsg.): Mit Kohle und Dampf. Ausstellungskatalog. Linz 2006.
- Elmar Oberegger: Die österreichischen Pferde-Eisenbahnen. In: Veröffentlichungen des Info-Büros für Österreichische Eisenbahngeschichte. 1, Sattledt 2007, 8 pages.
- Elmar Oberegger: Kurze Geschichte der Budweiser-Bahn. Č.Budějovice – Gaisbach-Wartberg – Linz/St. Valentin. In: Veröffentlichungen des Info-Büros für Österreichische Eisenbahngeschichte. 13, Sattledt 2007, 6 pages.
- Elmar Oberegger: Die Erste (österreichische) Eisenbahngesellschaft und ihr Netz 1824–1903. In: Veröffentlichungen des Info-Büros für Österreichische Eisenbahngeschichte. 5, Sattledt 2008, 29 pages.
- Franz Pfeffer: Oberösterreichs erste Eisenbahnen. In: Oberösterreichische Heimatblätter. 5, No. 2, 1951, pp. 97–181, Teil 1 (PDF) im Forum OoeGeschichte.at, Teil 2 (PDF) at Forum OoeGeschichte.at.
- Franz Pfeffer (Hrsg.): Oberösterreichs erste Eisenbahn in zeitgenössischen Schilderungen (F. C. Weidmann, Gustav Fobbe, Otto Prechtler). In: Oberösterreichische Heimatblätter. Linz 1962, online (PDF) at Forum OoeGeschichte.at.
- Erich Preuß: Die Pferdebahn Budweis–Linz–Gmunden – aus ihrer Geschichte zur musealen Aufbereitung. In: Jahrbuch für Eisenbahngeschichte. Band 31, 1999, ISBN 3-921700-81-7.
- Wilhelm Riehs: Die Pferdeeisenbahn Budweis–Linz–Gmunden. In: Jahrbuch des Musealvereines Wels 1969/70. Nr. 16, Wels 1970, online (PDF) im Forum OoeGeschichte.at.
- Hermann Savernik: Der Dampfbetrieb auf der Pferdeeisenbahn (Budweis –) Linz – Gmunden. ÖGEG, Linz 2009, ISBN 978-3-902709-15-8.
- Ulrich Schefold: 150 Jahre Eisenbahn in Österreich. Südwest-Verlag, München 1986.
- Johannes Sima: Die Pferdeeisenbahn Budweis – Linz – Gmunden. Ein Beispiel der Technikgeschichte aus der Sicht des Denkmalschutzes. Wien 2008, Dissertation der TU-Wien (PDF; 57,4 MB).
- Anton Wilhelm, Wilhelm Freh und Fritz Czauczer: Die Pferdebahn Budweis–Linz–Gmunden. Die eisenbahngeschichtliche Sammlung des OÖ. Landesmuseums. Ausstellung im Linzer Schloss. In: Kataloge des oberösterreichischen Landesmuseums. Linz 1971.
