= Timeline of railway history =

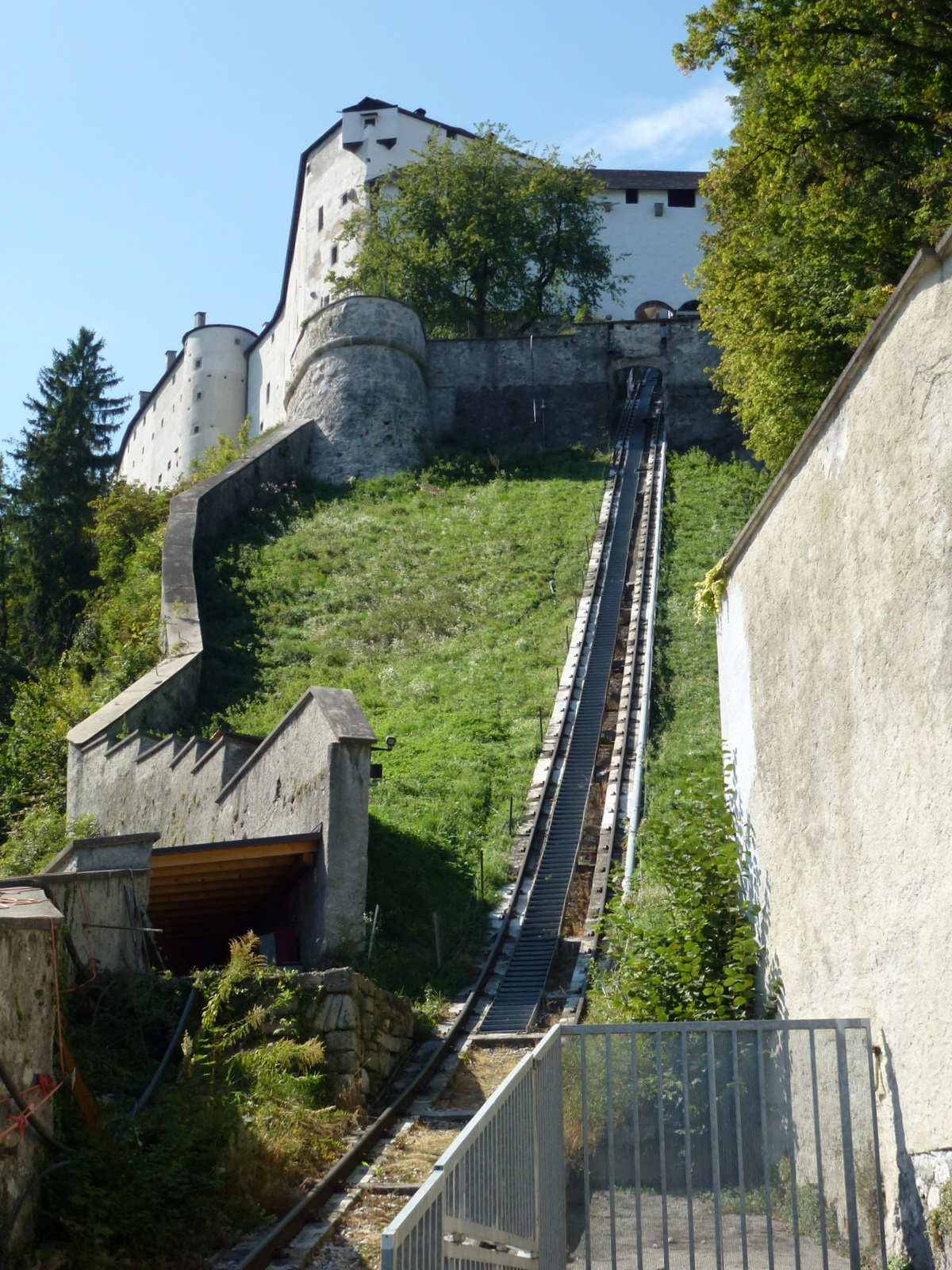
Reisszug, as it appears today

== Antiquity ==
- c. 700 BC – A basic form of the railway, the rutway, – existed in ancient Greek and Roman times, the most important being the ship trackway Diolkos across the Isthmus of Corinth. Measuring between 6 and 8.5 km, remaining in regular and frequent service for at least 650 years, and being open to all on payment, it constituted even a public railway, a concept that, according to Lewis, did not recur until around 1800. The Diolkos was reportedly used until at least the middle of the 1st century AD, after which no more written references appear.

== 16th–18th century ==
- In 1515, Cardinal Matthäus Lang wrote a description of the Reisszug, a funicular railway at the Hohensalzburg Fortress in Austria. The line originally used wooden rails and a hemp haulage rope and was operated by human or animal power through a treadwheel. The line still exists today and remains operational, though in updated form. It may be the oldest operational railway.

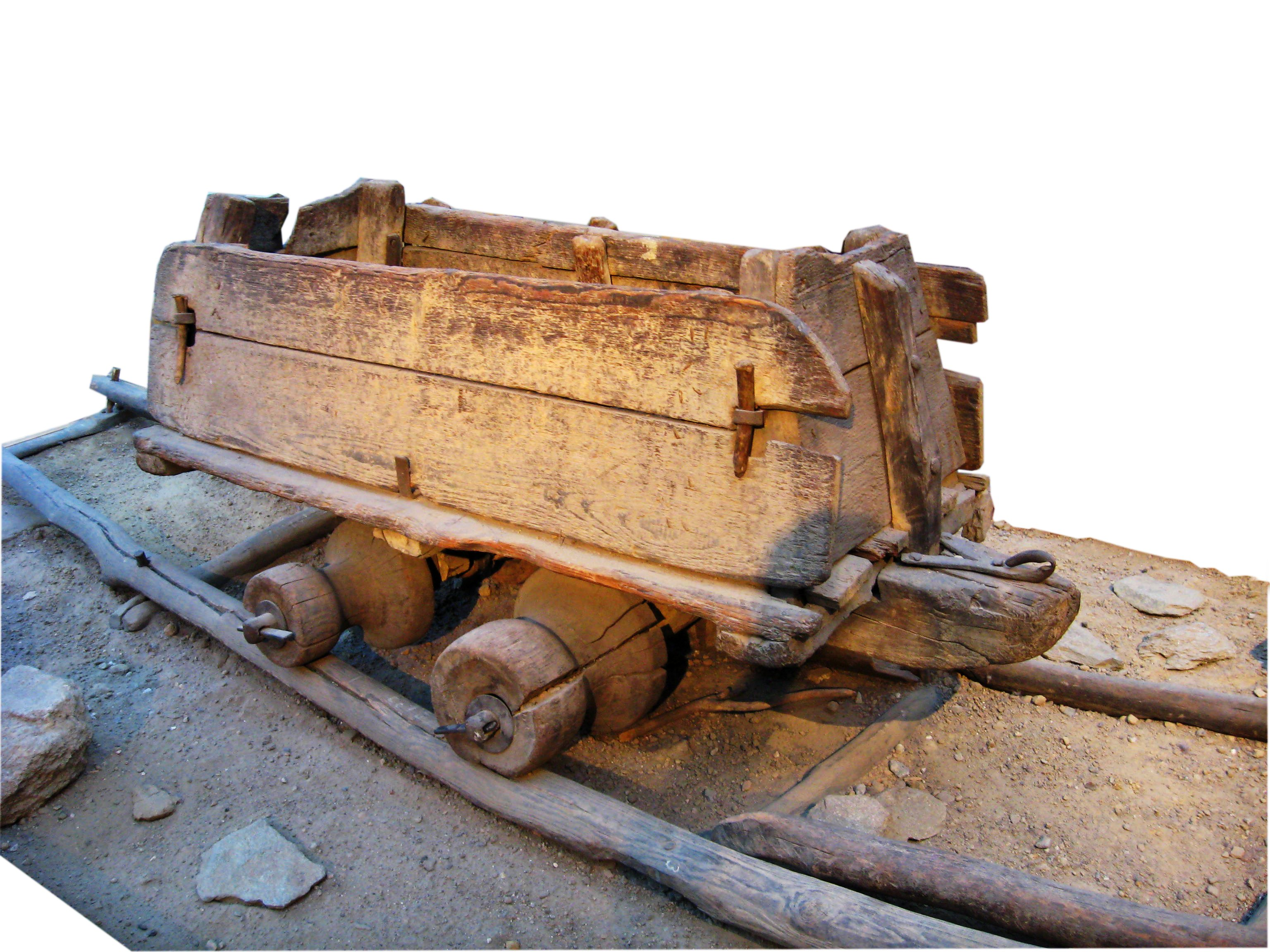
A minecart from the 16th century, found in Transylvania where German miners from Saxony settled, which brought with them the technology

- Mid 16th century (1550) – Hand propelled mining tubs known as "hunt" ("dog") were used in the provinces surrounding/forming modern day Germany by the mid-16th century having been improved use since the mid-15th century. This technology was brought to England by German miners working in the Minerals Royal at various sites in the English Lake District near Keswick (now in Cumbria).
- c.1594 – The first overground railway line in England may have been a wooden-railed, horse-drawn tramroad which was built at Prescot, near Liverpool, around 1600 and possibly as early as 1594. Owned by Philip Layton, the line carried coal from a pit near Prescot Hall to a terminus about half a mile away.
- c.1600 – A funicular railway was made at Broseley in Shropshire some time before 1605 to carry coal for James Clifford from his mines down to the river Severn to be loaded onto barges and carried to riverside towns.
- 1604 – Huntingdon Beaumont, partner of landowner Sir Percival Willoughby, built the Wollaton Wagonway, running from mines at Strelley to Wollaton in Nottinghamshire. It was approximately two miles in length. Beaumont built three further wagonways shortly afterwards near Blyth, Northumberland, to service the coal and salt trades.
- 1722 – The Tranent – Cockenzie Waggonway was built by the York Buildings Company of London, to transport coal from the Tranent pits to the salt pans at Cockenzie and the Harbour at Port Seton, in Haddingtonshire, now East Lothian. This wooden waggonway was replaced in 1815 with an iron fish bellied edgeway to Cockenzie Harbour by the new owners, the Cadell family. This was Scotland's first railway of any kind, with one section of it remaining in constant use until 1962. Some in situ stone sleeper blocks survive at the Robert Stevenson designed Cockenzie Harbour, and the entirety of the route is a way marked footpath.
- 1725 – The Tanfield Wagonway was constructed to lead coal from pits around Tanfield to the Tyne at Redheugh (Gateshead). It was the first railway built on a large scale – 5 miles of double wooden track with massive civil engineering works including deep cuttings, huge embankments and the world's first large masonry railway bridge, the Causey Arch. Each 2.5 ton capacity waggon (with flanged wooden wheels) was hauled by a horse, up to 60 waggons per hour at peak times. Two miles of the wagonway route are still in use by the Tanfield Railway, making this the oldest operational railway in the world.
- 1758 – The Middleton Railway, the first railway granted powers by an Act of Parliament, carried coal cheaply from the Middleton pits to Leeds. The line was privately financed and operated, initially as a wagonway using horse-drawn wagons. Around 1799, the wooden tracks were replaced with iron edge rails at a gauge of 4 ft 1 in (1,245 mm). In 1812 the Middleton Railway became the first commercial railway to successfully use steam locomotives: the Salamanca, which used John Blenkinsop's patented design for rack propulsion.
- 1760s – Iron production in Britain began to rise dramatically, followed by a similar rise on the European continent. This was the result of the use of coke for smelting and refining pig iron and cast iron and the application of the steam engine and cast iron blowing cylinder to providing pressurized air for blast furnaces.
- 1768 – The Wagon Way was constructed by the Erskines of Mar in Alloa, to carry coal from the Clackmannanshire coalfields of central Scotland to the Port of Alloa. Initially using wooden rails, these were later clad in Swedish iron (1785), and carried horse-drawn wagons. Some of the Wagon Way route still exists, although the tracks are long gone.
- 1783 – Henry Cort patented the grooved rolling mill for rolling hot iron to expel molten slag. Rolling was 15 times faster than hammering.
- 1783 – Henry Cort patented the puddling process for making wrought iron. This was the first large scale process for making a structural grade of iron and was also much less expensive than previous methods. Puddled iron production came into widespread production after 1800.
- 1784 – William Murdoch demonstrated a steam carriage powered by a high-pressure engine. He would later show it to his neighbour Richard Trevithick who would go on to build locomotives.
- 1789 – The Charnwood Forest Canal, sometimes known as the "Forest Line of the Leicester Navigation" uses railways to supplement the canal between Nanpantan and Loughborough, Leicestershire. William Jessop had constructed a horse-drawn railway for coal wagons. He successfully used an iron edge-rail, in contrast to his partner Benjamin Outram, who preferred the traditional iron L-shaped flange-rail plateway.
- 1793 – The Butterley Gangroad or the "Crich Rail-way" was built by Benjamin Outram, to connect the Warner Limestone Quarry to the Cromford Canal a mile away at Bullbridge. This railway included the oldest known railway tunnel located at Fritchley.
- 1798 – The Lake Lock Rail Road, arguably the world's first public railway, opened in 1798 to carry coal from the Outwood area to the Aire and Calder navigation canal at Lake Lock near Wakefield, West Yorkshire, a distance of approximately 3 miles. The load of three wagons was hauled by one horse. The track used edge rails with a gauge of 3 ft 4 3/4 in (1,035 mm). The use of the line gradually declined and was closed in 1836.

== 1800 to 1849 ==
- 1800 – The Boulton & Watt steam engine patent expired, allowing others to build high-pressure engines with high power-to-weight ratios, suitable for locomotives.
- 1802 – The Carmarthenshire Railway or Tramroad, a horse-drawn goods line, located in south west Wales, was established by an Act of Parliament. This line was used for coal transportation. It was a plateway of about 4 foot gauge, and using a pair of horses for power.
- 1802 – Unable to construct a canal similar to the nearby Cyfarthfa Ironworks, three of the four principal ironworks at Merthyr Tydfil, Wales: Dowlais, Plymouth and Penydarren, collaborated in building the 9.5-mile Merthyr Tramroad between Merthyr Tydfil and Abercynon. It was a single-track plateway with a gauge of 4 ft 4 in over the flanges of the L-shaped cast-iron plate rails. The plates were 3 ft long. One horse pulled about five trams.
- 1803 – The Surrey Iron Railway, London opened. It linked the towns of Wandsworth and Croydon via Mitcham on the south of the Thames. It was double track plateway throughout with a spacing of about 5 feet. The rails were of the Outram pattern and were L-shaped in cross-section and 3 feet 2 inches long. The line was closed in 1846. A part of the route is now used by Tramlink between Wimbledon and West Croydon.
- 1804 – First steam locomotive railway using a locomotive called the Penydarren or Pen-y-Darren was built by Richard Trevithick. It was used to haul iron from Merthyr Tydfil to Abercynon, Wales. The first train carried a load of 10 tons of iron. On one occasion it successfully hauled 25 tons. However, as the weight of the locomotive was about 5 tons the locomotive's weight broke many of the cast iron plate rails.
- 1805 – The Croydon Merstham & Godstone goods railway opens. It was the first commercial railway and was connected to the Surrey Iron Railway.
- 1807 – First fare-paying, horse-drawn passenger railway service in the world was established on the Oystermouth Railway in Swansea, Wales. Later this became known as the Swansea & Mumbles Railway although the railway was more affectionately known as "The Mumbles Train" (Welsh: Tren Bach I'r Mwmbwls). The railway was laid in the form of a plateway, with the rails being approximately 4 ft (1,219 mm) in width.
- 1808 – The Kilmarnock & Troon Railway was the first railway in Scotland authorised by an Act of Parliament. It was a plateway, using L-shaped iron plates as rails. In 1817 it was also the first railway in Scotland to trial a steam locomotive. It was the Blücher that George Stephenson had used at the Killingworth Colliery. This locomotive could haul 30 tons of coal up a hill at 4 mph (6.4 km/h). It was used to tow coal wagons along the wagonway from Killingworth to Wallsend. It was subsequently withdrawn from service because of damage to the cast iron rails.
- 1808 – Richard Trevithick sets up a "steam circus" (a circular steam railway using the locomotive Catch Me Who Can) in London for some months, for the public to experience for 1 shilling each.
- 1809 – Thomas Leiper constructed a 60 ft long test railway in Philadelphia to show that one horse could haul ten times more weight on a railed road than on an earthen road. The railway was constructed with stone sleepers and wooden rails.
- 1810 – Thomas Leiper constructed a 3/4 mile long railroad to transport gneiss from his quarry in Avondale Pennsylvania to Ridley Creek.
- 1812 – First commercial use of a steam locomotive on the Middleton Railway, Leeds. Matthew Murray of Fenton, Murray & Wood, located in Holbeck, designed a locomotive with a pinion that meshed with a rack. Murray's design was based on Richard Trevithick's locomotive, Catch Me Who Can, adapted to use John Blenkinsop's rack and pinion system, and was called Salamanca. It was the first two-cylinder locomotive.
- 1813 – Wylam Waggonway started commercial operation. The wagonway was used to haul coal chaldron wagons from the mine at Wylam to the docks at Lemington-on-Tyne in Northumberland using the steam locomotive Puffing Billy. Puffing Billy was constructed by coal viewer, William Hedley, enginewright, Jonathan Forster, and engineer Timothy Hackworth for Christopher Blackett, the owner of Wylam Colliery. The wagon way was used for hauling coal for 50 years .
- 1814 – George Stephenson constructs his first locomotive, Blücher for the Killingworth wagonway. The locomotive was modelled on Matthew Murray's. It could haul 30 tons of coal up a hill at 4 mph (6.4 km/h) but was too heavy to run on wooden rails or iron rails which existed at that time.
- 1822 – Stephenson's Hetton colliery railway was the first purpose-built railway not to use animal power, instead using stationary engines, inclines and purpose built steam locomotives.
- 1825 – Stephenson's Stockton & Darlington Railway was the first publicly subscribed railway to use steam locomotives. It carried freight from collieries near Shildon to Darlington and Stockton-on-Tees in County Durham. The line opened on 26 September 1825. The following day, 550 passengers were hauled, making this the world's first steam-powered passenger railway, contrary to Liverpool's claims five years later.
- 1825 John Stevens of Hoboken, New Jersey built a 1/2 mile circular test railroad track and also built a steam locomotive, the first in America. The locomotive had a pinion and the track had a rack.
- 1826, January – The first section of the Springwell Colliery Railway, later to be known as the Bowes Railway, opened. This section was the first six miles of what would become a 15-mile railway, using a mix of locomotive and rope (cable) haulage. Part of the original line is now a British scheduled monument.
- 1827, 30 June – The first railway in France opened between Saint-Etienne and Andrézieux (horse-drawn carriage). Tests had been run from 1 May 1827.
- 1827, January to May – Construction of the Mauch Chunk Switchback Railway to transport anthracite from mines in the mountains of Pennsylvania to the Lehigh River. It started operations in 1828.
- 1828 – The Bolton & Leigh Railway opened on 1 August with the locomotive Lancashire Witch pulling wagons loaded with approximately 150 passengers. However, regular passenger services did not start until 1831.
- 1828 – Railway (horse-drawn carriage) České Budějovice – Linz, first public railway in continental Europe, with length 120 km and rail gauge 1,106 mm (3 ft 7 1/2 in), section České Budějovice – Kerschbaum put into operation on 30 September 1828.
- 1828 – The Hot blast technology was patented by James Beaumont Neilson. It was the most important development of the 19th century for saving energy in making pig iron. Hot blast also dramatically increased the capacity of blast furnaces and improved the quality of iron made with coke (fuel).
- 1828 – From 4 July the Baltimore & Ohio (B&O) began constructing a track. The South Carolina Railroad Company commenced construction a few months later.
- 1829 - George and Robert Stephenson's locomotive, Rocket, sets a speed record of 47 km/h (29 mph) at the Rainhill Trials held in between Liverpool and Manchester, UK.
- 1829, 8 August – Delaware & Hudson Railroad, constructed using 16 miles of wood rails capped by strap iron, conducts the first test of Stourbridge Lion steam engine built in England.
- 1830 – The Canterbury & Whitstable Railway opened in Kent, England on 3 May, three months before the Liverpool and Manchester Railway. Built by George Stephenson, this was a 5¾ mile line running from Canterbury to the small port and fishing town of Whitstable, approximately 55 miles east of London. Traction was provided by three stationary winding engines, and Invicta which was a 0-4-0 locomotive, built by the Stephenson company, but only able to operate on level sections of track because the locomotive only produced a meagre 9 horsepower.
- 1830 – The first public railway in the United States, the Baltimore & Ohio Railroad, opened with 23 miles of track, with mostly hardwood rail topped with iron. The steam locomotive, Tom Thumb, was designed and built by Peter Cooper for the B&O, the first American-built steam locomotive. Trials of the locomotive began on the B&O that year.
- 1830 – The Liverpool & Manchester Railway opened. It marked the beginning of the first steam passenger service which was locomotive-hauled and did not use animal power. The line had the first timetables for passengers and proper stations (with ticketing offices and platforms) and went on to prove the viability of rail transport.
- 1830 – The first portion of the Saint-Étienne–Lyon railway opened between Givors and Rive-de-Gier on 1 July 1830. The rest of the line opened on 1 October 1832 for passenger use only, accepting freight a few months later. It used iron rails on dice stones. The line was 58 km long with 112 bridges and three tunnels. The locomotives were based on George Stephenson's Locomotion, but with a tubular boiler that produced six times more power.
- 1831 – First railway in Australia, for the Australian Agricultural Company, a cast iron fish belly gravitational railway servicing the A Pit coal mine.
- 1831 – First passenger season tickets issued on the Canterbury & Whitstable Railway.
- 1832 – The Leicester and Swannington Railway opened in Leicestershire. It was the first steam railway in the English Midlands.
- 1832 – The railway switch is patented by Charles Fox.
- 1833 – Swindon Works in England is founded by the Great Western Railway.
- 1834 – The first section of the Boston & Albany Railroad opens, subsequently to become part of the New York Central Railroad.
- 1834 – The world's first commuter railway, the Dublin & Kingstown Railway (D&KR) opened between Dublin and Kingstown (now Dún Laoghaire), covering a distance of six miles.
- 1835 – The first railway in Belgium opened on 5 May between Brussels and Mechelen. In 1836 a second section between Mechelen and Antwerp opened. The line still exists (now known as line 25) and is used by high speed trains between Paris and Amsterdam.
- 1835, 7 December – Bavarian Ludwigsbahn, the first steam-powered German railway line, opened for public service between Nuremberg and Fürth.
- 1836, 21 July – First public railway in Canada, the Champlain and Saint Lawrence Railroad, opened in Quebec with a 16-mile run between La Prairie and Saint-Jean-sur-Richelieu.
- 1837 – Partial opening of the West Coast Main Line by the London & Birmingham Railway. The complete route which ran from London Euston to Birmingham, covered 112 miles (180 km), opened during 1838, becoming England's first inter-city line. Euston became London's first railway terminus.
- 1837 – The first Cuban railway (under Spanish rule) line connected Havana with Bejucal. In 1838 the line reached Güines. This was the first railway in Hispanic America.
- 1837 – The Leipzig–Dresden Railway Company opened the first long-distance German railway line, connecting Leipzig with Althen near Wurzen. In 1839 the line reached Dresden.
- 1837 – The first Austrian railway line connected Vienna with Wagram. In 1839 the line reached Brno.
- 1837 – The first rail line in Russia connected Tsarskoye Selo and Saint Petersburg.
- 1837 – The first line in Paris (Paris-Saint Germain Line) opened between Le Pecq near the former royal town of Saint-Germain-en-Laye and Embarcadère des Bâtignoles (later to become Gare Saint-Lazare). It was the first railway in Paris and the first in France designed solely for the carriage of passengers and operated using steam locomotives. The western section from Saint-Germain to Nanterre is now part of the RER A, the busiest railway line in Europe.
- 1837 – Robert Davidson built the first electric locomotive.
- 1838 – The world's first railroad junction is formed in Branchville, South Carolina. The railroad company extended its existing rail that ran between Charleston and the Savannah River to the north toward Orangeburg and Columbia. Both rail lines closely paralleled old Native American trails.
- 1838 – Edmondson railway ticket introduced.
- 1839 – The first railway in the Kingdom of the Two Sicilies, Italy, opened from Naples to Portici.
- 1839 – The Great Western Railway, from London’s Paddington Station to the city of West Drayton Station, a distance of 13 miles, became the first railway line with a permanent telegraph system, using a Cooke and Wheatstone telegraph.
- 1839 – The first rail line in the Netherlands connected Amsterdam and Haarlem.
- 1840s – Railway Mania sweeps the United Kingdom. 6,220 miles (10,010 km) of railway lines were built during the decade.
- 1840 – The Wilmington and Weldon Railroad in North Carolina becomes the longest railroad in the world with 161.5 miles (259.9 km) of track.
- 1841 – The Great Western Railway was completed from London Paddington to Bridgwater via Bristol, a total of 152 miles (245 km).
- 1842, 6 November – First railway to cross an international border in Europe is opened. The line ran between Mouscron (Belgium) and Tourcoing (France).
- 1843 – The first rail line connecting Brussels (Belgium) with Cologne (Prussia) via Liège and Aachen (see Rhenish Railway Company).
- 1844 – The first rail line in Congress Poland was built between Warsaw and Pruszków.
- 1844 – The first Atmospheric Railway, the Dalkey Atmospheric Railway opened for passenger service between Kingstown and Dalkey in Ireland. The line was 3 km in length & operated for 10 years.
- 1845 – The first railway line built in Jamaica opened on 21 November. The line ran 15 miles from Kingston to Spanish Town. It was also the first rail line built in any of Britain's West Indies colonies. The Earl of Elgin, Jamaica's Governor, presided over the opening ceremonies, by the late 1860s the line extended 105 miles to Montego Bay.
- 1845 – Royal Commission on Railway Gauges to choose between Stephenson's gauge and Brunel's gauge.
- 1846 – James McConnell met with George Stephenson and Archibald Slate at Bromsgrove. This meeting led to the establishment of the Institution of Mechanical Engineers.
- 1846 – The first railway line in Hungary connects Pest and Vác.
- 1846 – First international railway connection between two capitals, Paris and Brussels.
- 1846 – The Surrey Iron Railway closes, the first railway to cease operations.
- 1847 – Pennsylvania Railroad opens with a line between Harrisburg and Pittsburgh, Pennsylvania.
- 1847 – First train in Switzerland, the Limmat, on the Spanisch-Brotli-Bahn Railway line.
- 1848 – First railway line in Spain, built between Barcelona and Mataró.
- 1848 – First railway in South America, British Guyana. The railway was designed, surveyed and built by the British-American architect and artist Frederick Catherwood. John Bradshaw Sharples built all the railway stations, bridges, stores, and other facilities. Financing was provided by the Demerera Sugar Company, which wished to transport their product to the dock of Georgetown. Construction was in sections with the first, from Georgetown to Plaisance, opening on 3 November 1848.

== 1850 to 1899 ==
- 1850: Kilometres of railway line in operation in Europe: Great Britain: 9797 (plus Ireland: 865); Germany: 5856; France: 2915; Austria: 1357; Belgium: 854; Russia: 501; Netherlands: 176.
- 1851 – First train in Chile from Caldera to Copiapó (80 km)
- 1851 – Initiative taken for a railway system in British India, for setting up military routes and growing trade.
- 1851 – Moscow – Saint Petersburg Railway
- 1852 – The first railway in Africa, in Alexandria, Egypt.
- 1853 – Railways introduced to India, train ran from Bombay (now Mumbai) to Thane.
- 1853 – Indianapolis Union Station, the first union station, opened by the Terre Haute and Richmond Railroad, Madison and Indianapolis Railroad, and Bellefontaine Railroad in the United States.
- 1854 – The first railway in Brazil, inaugurated by Pedro II of Brazil on 30 April in Rio de Janeiro, built by the Viscount of Maua.
- 1854 – The first railway in Norway. Between Oslo and Eidsvoll.
- 1854 – The first railway in today's Romania and Serbia (then Austrian Empire), on 20 August 1854, between Lisava-Oravica-Bazijaš.
- 1854 – First steam drawn railway in Australia. Melbourne to Hobson's Bay, Victoria.
- 1855 – The Panama Railway with over 50 miles (80 km) of track is completed after five years of work across the Isthmus of Panama at a cost of about $8,000,000 and over 6,000 lives—the first 'transcontinental railway'.
- 1856 – The first railway in Papal State, Italy, from Rome to Frascati.
- 1856 – First railway completed in Portugal, linking Lisbon to Carregado.
- 1856 – Paris–Marseille railway opened, which together with other railways north of Paris created the first transcontinental railroad (from the English Channel to the Mediterranean Sea)
- 1857 – Steel rails first used in Britain.
- 1857 – The first railway in Argentina, built by Ferrocarril del Oeste between Buenos Aires and Flores, a distance of 10 km, opened to the public on 30 August.
- 1858 – The first railway line in Ottoman Empire (Turkiye) opens between Izmir-Aydin.
- 1858 – Henri Giffard invented the injector for steam locomotives.
- 1861 – First railway in Paraguay, from the station to the Port of Asuncion on 14 June.
- 1862 – The first railway in Finland, from Helsinki to Hämeenlinna.
- 1862 – The Warsaw – Saint Petersburg Railway is opened.
- 1863 – First underground railway, the 4-mile (6.4 km) Metropolitan Railway opened in London. The adapted steam engines held condensed steam and let it out only at particular tunnel locations that had air vents. This gave rise to a new mode of subterranean urban transit: the Subway/U-Bahn/Metro.
- 1863 – Scotsman Robert Francis Fairlie invented the Fairlie locomotive with pivoted driving bogies, so trains could negotiate tighter track curves. This innovation was rare for steam locomotives, but was the model for most future diesel and electric locomotives.
- 1863 – First steam railway in New Zealand opened from Christchurch to Ferrymead.
- 1863 – World's first narrow – gauge steam locomotive built, The Princess (Later named Princess) for the Ffestiniog Railway
- 1864 – First railway line opened in Mauritius. The North line covered 50 km (31 mi) and started operation on 23 May.
- 1865 – Pullman sleeping car introduced in the USA.
- 1866 – Ruse-Varna is the first railway line completed in Bulgaria (then part of the Ottoman Empire), connecting the Danube port of Ruse with the Black Sea port of Varna.
- 1869 – The First Transcontinental Railroad (North America) completed across the United States from Omaha, Nebraska to Sacramento, California. Built by Central Pacific and Union Pacific.
- 1869 – George Westinghouse established the Westinghouse Air Brake Company in the United States.
- 1870 – The Paldiski-Tallinn-St Petersburg line is opened as the first railway line in Estonia (then part of the Russian Empire).
- 1871 – The Poti-Zestaponi line is opened as the first railway line in Georgia (country) and Caucasus.
- 1872 – The first passenger train ran on 10 October 1872, from Poti to Tbilisi.
- 1872 – The first railway in Japan was inaugurated by government of Japan, and connected between Shimbashi in Tokyo and Yokohama.
- 1872 – The Midland Railway put in a third-class coach on its trains.
- 1875 – Midland Railway introduced eight and twelve wheeled bogie coaches.
- 1877 – Vacuum brakes are invented in the United States.
- 1879 – First electric railway demonstrated at the Berlin Trades Fair.
- 1881 – First public electric tram line, the Gross-Lichterfelde Tramway, opened in Berlin, Germany.
- 1881 – One of the first railway lines in the Middle East was built between Tehran and Rayy in Iran.
- 1882 – Lavatories were introduced on the Great Northern Railway coaches in Britain
- 1882 – The Atchison, Topeka & Santa Fe Railway connected Atchison, Kansas with the Southern Pacific at Deming, New Mexico, thus completing a second transcontinental railroad in the U.S..
- 1882 – First line in Kingdom of Serbia: 12 km long 600 mm wide gauge track from Majdanpek copper processing plant to Velike Livade, constructed by the "Serbian Copper & Iron Co" (official name in English, most stock holders were British), first run in June 1882.
- 1883 – First electric tram line using electricity served from an overhead line, the Mödling and Hinterbrühl Tram opened in Austria.
- 1883 – Southern Pacific linked New Orleans with Los Angeles thus completing the third U.S. transcontinental railroad.
- 1883 – The Northern Pacific Railway links Chicago with Seattle—the fourth U.S. transcontinental railroad.
- 1883 – The Orient Express, a long-distance passenger train service connecting Paris to Constantinople / Istanbul, was created by Compagnie Internationale des Wagons-Lits (CIWL).
- 1885 – The Canadian Pacific is completed 5 years ahead of schedule, the longest single railway of its time, which links the eastern and western provinces of Canada.
- 1888 – Frank Sprague installs the "trolleypole" trolley system in Richmond, Virginia, making it the first large scale electric street railway in the US, though the first commercial installation of an electric streetcar in the United States was built in 1884 in Cleveland, Ohio and operated for a period of one year by the East Cleveland Street Railway Company.
- 1888, 30 May – The first railway in British Hong Kong, Peak Tram opened.
- 1889 – The first interurban tram-train to emerge in the United States was the Newark and Granville Street Railway in Ohio, which opened in 1889.
- 1890 – The City & South London Railway was the first deep-level underground "tube" railway in the world, (Note: A "tube" railway is an underground railway constructed in a cylindrical tunnel by the use of a tunnelling shield, usually deep below ground level.) and the first major railway to use electric traction
- 1891 – Construction began on the 9,313 km (5,787 mi) long Trans-Siberian Railway in Russia. Construction completed in 1904. Webb C. Ball established the first railway watch official guidelines for railroad chronometers.
- 1892 – The first horse-drawn tram line in Belgrade, Serbia.
- 1893 – The Liverpool Overhead Railway opened on 6 March 1893 with 2-car electric multiple units, the first to operate in the world.
- 1893 – The first railway in Thailand between Bangkok to Samut Prakan opened (13.05 mi). The Great Northern Railway linked St Paul, Minnesota to Seattle—the fifth U. S. transcontinental railroad.
- 1894 – Thailand's tram line using electricity served in Bangkok.
- 1894 – Serbia's first electric tram line in Belgrade.
- 1895 – Japan's first electrified railway opened in Kyoto.
- 1895 – First mainline electrification on a four-mile stretch (Baltimore Belt Line) of the Baltimore & Ohio
- 1898 – The first railway line in the Congo Free State between Matadi in the province of Kongo-Central to Kinshasa opened.
- 1899 – The first Korean railway line connects Noryangjin (Seoul) with Jemulpo (Incheon).
- 1899 – Tokyo's first electric railway, the predecessor to Keihin Electric Express Railway opened.
- 1899 – First use of three-phase alternating current in a mainline. The 40 km Burgdorf-Thun line opened in Switzerland

== 20th century ==
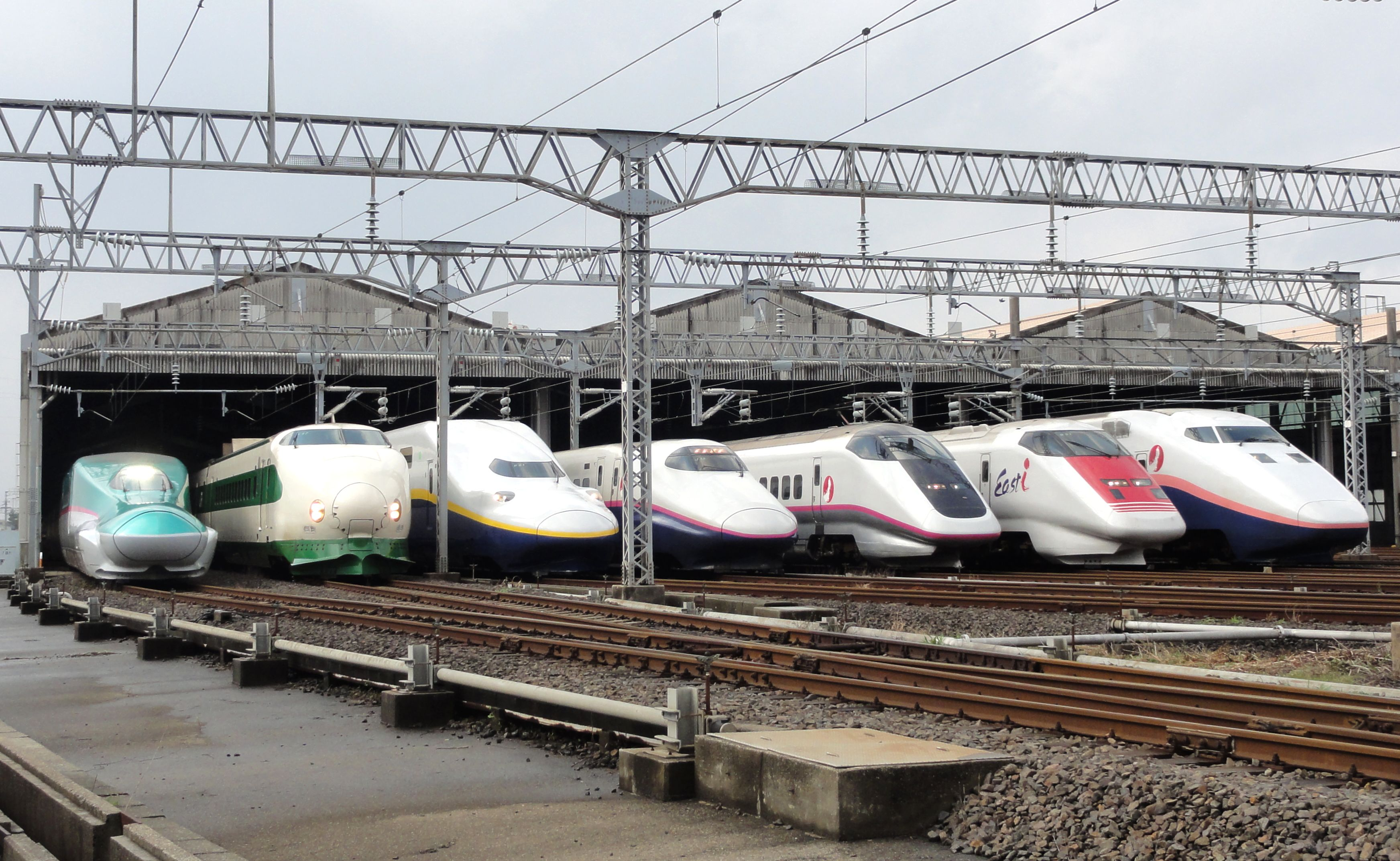
A lineup of JR East Shinkansen trains in October 2012

- 1901 – Kenya-Uganda Railway completed and opened.
- 1908 – Hejaz Railway opened.
- 1910 - Kowloon–Canton Railway (British section) opened.
- 1912 – The world's first diesel locomotive (a diesel-mechanical locomotive) was operated in the summer of 1912 on the Winterthur–Romanshorn railway in Switzerland.
- 1912 – Articulated trams, invented and first used by the Boston Elevated Railway.
- 1913 – First diesel powered railcar enters service in Sweden. In Austria-Hungary, the first electrified metric railway was opened between Arad and the neighboring vineyards, facilitating transportation of goods and people and reducing travel time from half a day to just one hour (total distance around 60 km).
- 1915 – First major stretch of electrified railway in Sweden; Kiruna-Riksgränsen (Malmbanan).
- 1916 - First South American electrified railway in Argentina; Retiro-Tigre R.
- 1917 – General Electric produced an experimental Diesel-electric locomotive using Lemp's control design—the first in the United States.
- 1920 – U.S. employment is 2,076,000.
- 1924 – First diesel-electric locomotive built in Soviet Union, Russian locomotive class E el-2.
- 1925 – The first electric train ran between Bombay (Victoria Terminus) and Kurla, a distance of 16 km. The first electric train of India.
- 1925 – Ingersoll Rand with traction motors supplied by General Electric built a prototype diesel switcher (shunter) locomotive, the AGEIR boxcabs. Mumbai to Pune route electrified in India, WCG 1 electric locomotives were introduced on the route.
- 1926 – First diesel locomotive service introduced in Canada.
- 1930 – GE began producing diesel-electric switching engines. WCP1 (EA/1), electric locomotives were introduced on the Mumbai – Pune Route.
- 1934 – the first train (Flying Scotsman) to officially hit 100 mph.
- 1934 – First diesel-powered streamlined passenger train in America (the Burlington Zephyr) introduced at the Chicago World's Fair.
- 1935 – First children's railway opens in Tbilisi, USSR.
- 1937–41 – Magnetic levitation (maglev) train patents awarded in Germany to Hermann Kemper, with design propelled by linear motors.
- 1938 – In England, the world speed record for steam traction was set by the Mallard, which reached a speed of 203 km/h (126 mph).
- 1939 – In Persia the Trans-Iranian Railway opened, built entirely by local capital.
- 1939 – Diesel-electric railroad locomotion entered the mainstream in the U.S. when the Burlington Railroad and Union Pacific start using diesel-electric "streamliners" to haul passengers.
- 1940 – U.S. employment is 1,046,000.
- 1942–45 – The U.S. gives over 117 steam locomotives worth over $2,624,182 ($1945) to the Soviet Union under U.S. Lend Lease.
- 1946 – U.S. railroads begin rapidly replacing their rolling stock with diesel-electric units—not completing the process until the mid-1960s.
- 1948, 1 January – British Railways formed by nationalising the assets of the 'Big Four' railway companies (GWR, LMS, LNER and SR).
- 1948, 1 March – Foreign-owned railway companies nationalised in Argentina during the first term of office of President Peron.
- 1951 – World's first preserved railway, the Talyllyn Railway, operates its first train under the preservation movement on 14 May 1951.
- 1953 – Japan sets narrow gauge world speed record of 145 km/h (90 mph) with Odakyū 3000 series SE Romancecar.
- 1959, April – Construction of the first segment of the Tōkaidō Shinkansen between Tokyo and Osaka commenced.
- 1960 – US employment is 793,000.
- 1960 – the last British steam engine is made (Evening Star).
- 1960s–2000s (decade) – Many countries adopt high-speed rail in an attempt to make rail transport competitive with both road transport and air transport.
- 1963, 27 March – Publication of The Reshaping of Britain's Railways (the Beeching Report). Generally known as the Beeching cuts, it led to the mass closure of 25% of route miles and 50% of stations during the decade following.
- 1964 – Shinkansen service introduced in Japan with the opening of the Tokaido Shinkansen at a maximum permitted speed of 210 km/h (130 mph). With subsequent timetable change of 1965, average end-to-end timetable speed between Tokyo and Shin-Osaka increased to 162.8 km/h (101.2 mph).
- 1967 – Automatic train operation introduced.
- 1968 – British Rail ran its last final steam-driven mainline train, named the Fifteen Guinea Special, after of a programmed withdrawal of steam during 1962–68. It marked the end of 143 years of its public railway use. Thailand's tram line was stop serviced.
- 1970, 21 June – Penn Central, the dominant railroad in the northeastern United States, became bankrupt (the largest US corporate bankruptcy up to that time). Created only two years earlier in 1968 from a merger of several other railroads, it marked the end of long-haul private-sector US passenger train services, and forced the creation of the government-owned Amtrak on 1 May 1971.
- 1975, 10 August – British Rail's experimental tilting train, the Advanced Passenger Train (APT) achieved a new British speed record, the APT-E reaching 245 km/h (152.3 mph). The prototype APT-P pushed the speed record further to 261 km/h (162.2 mph) in December 1979, but when put into service on 7 December 1981, it failed and was withdrawn days later, resuming only from 1980 to 1986 on the West Coast Main Line.
- 1981 – Port Island Line of Kobe first fully driverless train introduced.
- 1981 – High speed TGV services introduced in France with the partial opening of the LGV Sud-Est, at an initial top speed of 260 km/h (162 mph).
- 1982 – The maximum speed on the LGV Sud-Est is raised to 270 km/h (168 mph).
- 1984 – The Kolkata Metro opens, the first such system in South Asia.
- 1987 – World speed record for a diesel locomotive set by British Rail's High Speed Train (HST), which reached a speed of 238 km/h (148 mph).
- 1989 – Cairo Underground Metro Line 1 is the first line of underground in Africa and Middle East Line length 44 kilometres (27 mi) with 34 stations Daily ridership 1 million passenger Operating speed 100 km/h (62 mph).
- 1989 – The inauguration of the TGV Atlantique and the LGV Atlantique into service achieves a maximum commercial speed of 300 km/h (186 mph).
- 1990 – World speed record for an electric train is set in France by a TGV, reaching a speed of 515 km/h (320 mph).
- 1990 – ADtranz low floor tram world's first completely low-floor tram introduced.
- 1994–1997 – Privatisation of British Rail. The British government passes ownership of track and infrastructure to Railtrack on 1 April 1994 (replaced by Network Rail in 2002), with passenger operations later franchised to 25 individual private-sector operators, and freight services sold outright.

== 21st century ==
- 2000 – Amtrak introduced the Acela on the Northeast Corridor in the United States.
- 2000 – Storstockholms Lokaltrafik introduced the Tvärbanan in the Sweden.
- 2001 August – Northeast China first electrified railway opened between Shenyang and Harbin.
- 2001 – High Speed 1, Britain's first high-speed rail line opens, allowing trains to run from London Waterloo to Paris on dedicated high-speed track.
- 2003 – Germany introduces capa vehicle trams in Mannheim.
- 2007 – A modified French TGV trainset improves the world wheeled speed record when it reached 574.8 kilometres per hour (357.2 mph) on the LGV Est.
- 2007 – LGV Est opens with a maximum speed in service of 320 km/h (199 mph).
- 2008 – Beijing–Tianjin intercity railway opens with a maximum speed in service of 350 km/h (217 mph). (Note: Maximum speed on the national high-speed network was reduced in 2011 to at most 300 km/h following the Wenzhou train collision. 350 km/h operations restarted in 2017 beginning with the Beijing–Shanghai high-speed railway.)
- 2009 – Škoda 15 T world's first completely low-floor tram with articulated bogies introduced.
- 2015 – In March, China South Rail Corporation (CSR) demonstrated the world's first hydrogen fuel cell vehicle tramcar at an assembly facility in Qingdao. The chief engineer of the CSR subsidiary CRRC Qingdao Sifang
- 2017 – Ground-level power supply technology, TramWave, developed by Italian company Ansaldo, successfully entered commercial application via the opening of Zhuhai tram Line 1 first phase in China.
- 2018 – Alstom Coradia iLint hydrogen-powered train enters service in Lower Saxony, Germany.
- 2018 – driverless trams in Potsdam tested.
- 2020 – The world's first driverless, autonomous [bullet] train enters into service in China.
- 2021 – The pilot project of the "world's first automated, driverless [conventional] train" is launched in the city of Hamburg, Germany.

== See also ==
- History of rail transport
- History of rail transport in Great Britain
- Years in rail transport
- Timeline of United States railway history
- Timeline of transportation technology
