= Barry Railway Class K =

Class of 5 two-cylinder 0-6-2T locomotives

Type and origin
- Power type: Steam
- Designer: J. H. Hosgood
- Builder: Cooke Locomotive and Machine Works, Paterson, New Jersey, USA
- Build date: 1899
- Total produced: 5
Specifications
- Configuration
  - Whyte: 0-6-2T
  - UIC: C1 n2t
- Gauge: 4 ft 8 1/2 in (1,435 mm) standard gauge
- Driver dia.: 4 ft 3 in (1.295 m)
- Trailing dia.: 3 ft 6 in (1.067 m)
- Wheelbase: 15 ft 5 in (4.699 m)
- Loco weight: 56 long tons 5 cwt (126,000 lb or 57.2 t) (63.0 short tons)
- Fuel type: Coal
- Boiler pressure: 160 psi (1.10 MPa)
- Cylinders: Two outside
- Cylinder size: 18 in × 26 in (457 mm × 660 mm)
- Valve type: Richardson
Performance figures
- Tractive effort: 22,030 lbf (97.99 kN)
Career
- Operators: Barry Railway; → Great Western Railway
- Nicknames: Yankees
- Delivered: 1899
- Withdrawn: 1927–1932
- Disposition: All scrapped

Barry Railway Class K were 0-6-2T steam tank engines of the Barry Railway in South Wales. They were designed by J. H. Hosgood and built by an American company, Cooke Locomotive and Machine Works of Paterson, New Jersey. At the time the Barry wanted to order these locomotives, British manufacturers already had a full order book. In order not to face an indefinite wait, invitations to tender were advertised in the United States. Hosgood's aim was to have a tank engine equivalent to the “Class B1”. However, because of his desire for a speedy delivery, he agreed to certain compromises in the design. The order was placed in April 1899 and was delivered later that year. Like the 0-8-2 tank locomotives Cooke built for the Port Talbot Railway and Docks Company around the same time, the engines had the clean lines and uncluttered appearance of British practice, but had bar frames, the front buffer beam separate from the footplate, as well as cylinder and saddle designs typical of American practice.

== Traffic duties ==
Although originally intended for hauling main line mineral traffic, they proved to be very heavy on coal and water and therefore not a feasible prospect for this kind of work. They were therefore assigned other duties. Two of the class were sent to Hafod shed for banking duties on trains on the gradients between Trehafod Junction and Pontypridd and between Treforest Junction and Tonteg. The other three were assigned to hauling coal trains between Cadoxton Yard and Barry Docks. Later on, two of these were assigned to Hafod, joining the first two, for banking duties and the fifth was retained at Barry as shed pilot.

== Heavy on coal and water ==
When tests were originally carried out, it was found necessary to stop two or three times while taking empty wagons up to the Rhondda. According to one driver, it was not advisable to pass a single water column for fear of running short before the next one.

== Special train ==
Every year, on Good Friday, the Directors would organise an orchestral concert in Barry and arrange a special train from Trehafod to carry the company's employees and their families to the concert. As the "K Class" was vacuum fitted, they were the only engines stationed at Hafod shed suitably equipped to haul a passenger train. This tradition took place in the early 1900s.

== Withdrawal ==
The locomotives passed to the Great Western Railway in 1922 but were withdrawn between 1927 and 1932.

== Numbering ==
Year	Quantity	Manufacturer	Serial numbers	Barry numbers	GWR numbers	Notes
1899	5	Cooke Locomotive and Machine Works	2482–2486	117–121	193–197	
