= Bryan Station (disambiguation) =

Bryan Station was an early fortified settlement at present-day Lexington, Kentucky.

Bryan Station may also refer to:

- Bryan station (Ohio), an Amtrak train station in Bryan, Ohio
- Bryan Station, Lexington, Kentucky, a neighborhood in Lexington named for the historical settlement

== See also ==
- Bryn Station, Oslo, Norway
- Bryn railway station, Wigan, UK
- Bryn railway station (Glamorgan), Bryn, Neath Port Talbot, UK
