= Cooke Locomotive and Machine Works =

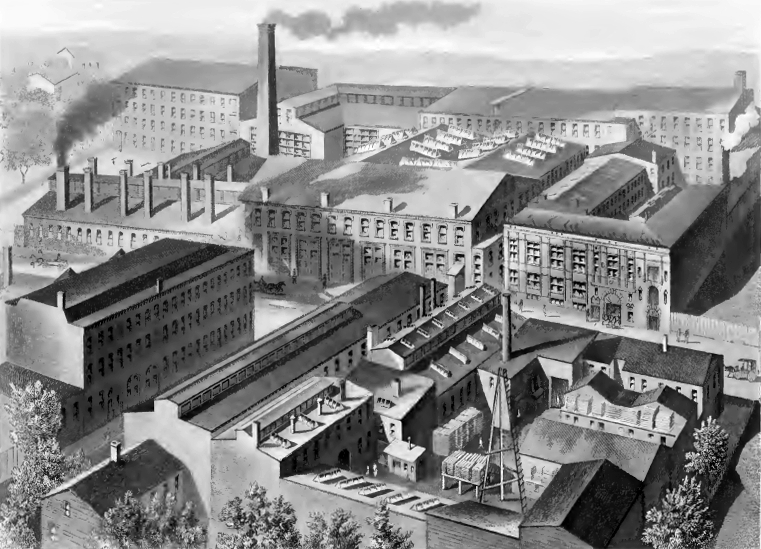
- Aerial view of the Cooke Locomotive and Machine Company in Paterson, New Jersey.
- Industry: Rail transport
- Founded: 1852 (as Danforth, Cooke, and Company)
- Founders: John Cooke; Charles Danforth; John Edwards; Edwin T. Prall
- Defunct: 1901
- Fate: Merged
- Successor: American Locomotive Company
- Headquarters: Paterson, New Jersey, United States
- Products: Steam locomotives and rolling stock, cotton machinery

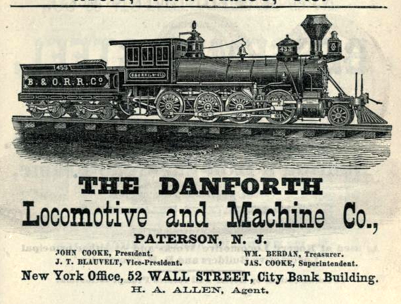
1877 advertisement of Danforth Locomotive and Machine Company

The Cooke Locomotive and Machine Works, located in Paterson, New Jersey, manufactured steam railroad locomotives from 1852 until it was merged with seven other manufacturers to form American Locomotive Company (ALCO) in 1901.

== History ==
The firm was established in 1852 by former Rogers Locomotive and Machine Works superintendent (and son-in-law of William Swinburne of Swinburne, Smith and Company) John Cooke and former Montreal resident Charles Danforth as the Danforth, Cooke, and Company, as a manufacturer of steam locomotives as well as cotton machinery. The company was renamed Danforth Locomotive and Machine Company in 1865, with Danforth serving as president until 1871, four years before his death in 1875. Cooke succeeded Danforth as president in 1871, continuing in such capacity until his own death in 1882, after which Cooke's sons, John, Frederick, and Charles reorganized the firm as the Cooke Locomotive and Machine Works, and continued operating the company as such until the merger in 1901.

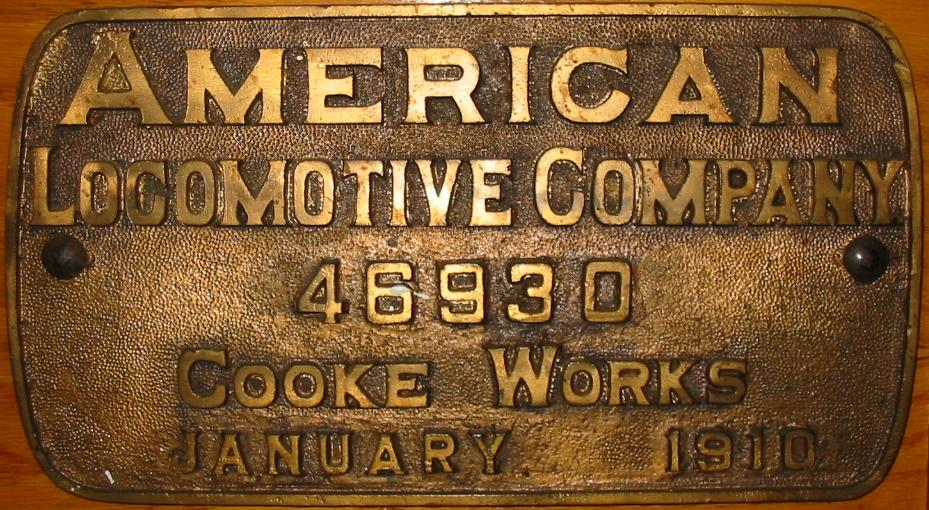
ALCO-Cooke builder's plate, 1910

In 1901, Cooke and several other locomotive manufacturers merged to form the American Locomotive Company; Cooke's plant becomes the Alco-Cooke Works, and locomotive production continued at the plant until 1926. Approximately 2600 locomotives were built by Cooke from 1852 to 1901, among the most notable engines produced by the firm are the C. P. Huntington, and the Western & Atlantic Railroad "Texas".

== Exports ==
In addition to providing motive power for North American railroads, Cooke has also produced many locomotives for Central and South America as well as other parts of the world. Examples of exported locomotives include two 0-8-2 tank locomotives for the Port Talbot Railway and Docks Company, South Wales, in 1899, as well as Barry Railway's five class K 0-6-2T locomotives the same year. The firm also produced 2-6-2T locomotives for the War Department Light Railways to be used in France during World War I, preserved examples of which can be found on the Froissy Dompierre Light Railway and Ffestiniog Railway.

== Preserved Cooke locomotives ==
The following is a list of preserved locomotives built by Cooke before the ALCO merger in 1901. They are listed here in serial number order.

Serial number	Wheel arrangement (Whyte notation)	Build date	Name	Disposition
unknown	4-4-0	October 1856	Western and Atlantic Railroad 49 Texas	Atlanta History Center, Atlanta, Georgia
277	4-2-4T	October 1863	Central Pacific Railroad #3 C. P. Huntington, Southern Pacific Railroad 1	California State Railroad Museum, Sacramento, California
1555	2-6-0	February 1884	Colorado and Southern Railway 9	Highline Park, Breckinridge, Colorado
1861	4-4-0	February 1888	Dardanelle and Russelville 8	Nevada State Railroad Museum, Carson City, Nevada
2053	4-6-0	October, 1890	Union Pacific Railroad 1242	Lion's Park, Cheyenne, Wyoming
2054	4-6-0	October, 1890	Union Pacific Railroad 1243	Durham Western Heritage Museum, Omaha, Nebraska
2197	4-6-0	April 1892	Texas and New Orleans Railroad 314	Center for Transportation and Commerce, Galveston, Texas
2202	4-6-0	April 1892	Texas and New Orleans Railroad 319	Riverdale, Georgia
2341	4-6-0	July 1896	Southern Pacific Railroad 2248	Grapevine Vintage Railroad, Grapevine, Texas
2360	4-6-0	March 1897	Southern Pacific Railroad 2252	Overlooking the Union Pacific classification yard, Roseville, California
2408	4-6-0	October 1898	Missouri Pacific Railroad 2522	Paris City Park, Paris, Arkansas

In addition to the above locomotives, the White Pass and Yukon Route railroad WP&YR owns and maintains a steam-powered snowplow built by Cooke in 1899. This unit is on static display in Skagway, Alaska (see Rotary snowplow for a photo).

The following is a list of preserved locomotives built at the Cooke factory after the ALCO merger.

Serial number	Wheel arrangement (Whyte notation)	Build date	Name	Disposition
28686	2-8-0	September 1903	Illinois Central 790	Steamtown National Historic Site, Scranton, Pennsylvania
55847	2-6-0	May 1916	Waynesburg & Washington 4	Greene County Historical Museum, Waynesburg, Pennsylvania
57128	2-6-2T	1916	RL 1257	Froissy Dompierre Light Railway, Somme, France
57156	2-6-2T	1916	War Department Light Railways No. LR 10003	Ffestiniog Railway, Porthmadog, Wales
57978	2-10-2	January 1918	Southern Pacific 975	Illinois Railway Museum, Union, Illinois
59286	2-8-0	May 1918	American Railroad Company 88	Museo del Tren, Isabela, Puerto Rico
62624	2-8-0	November 1920	Arcade and Attica 18	Arcade and Attica Railroad, Attica, New York

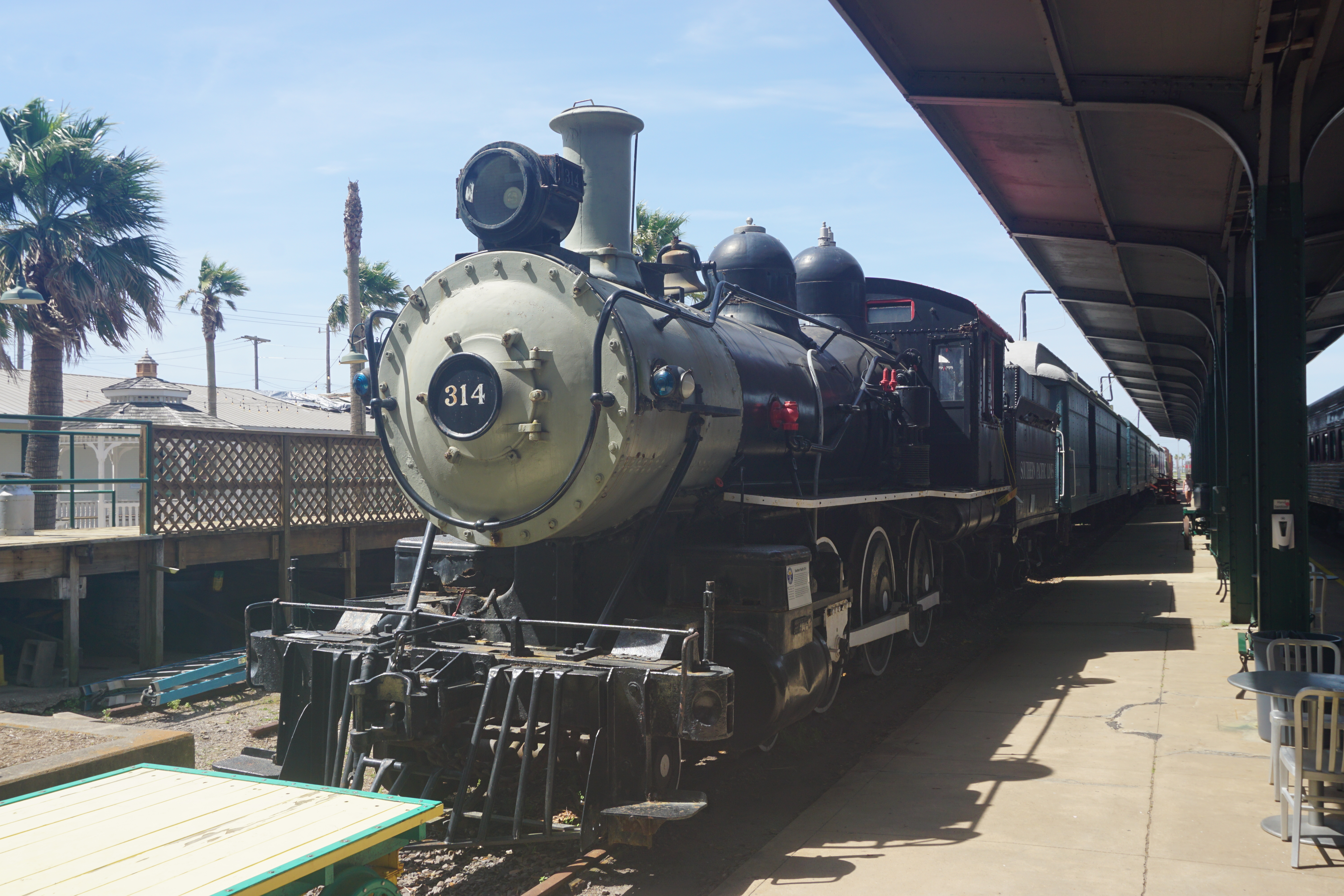
Southern Pacific 1892 Cooke 4-6-0 No. 314 at the Galveston Railroad Museum
