= Cwmdu railway station =

Disused railway station in Cwmdu, Bridgend

Cwmdu
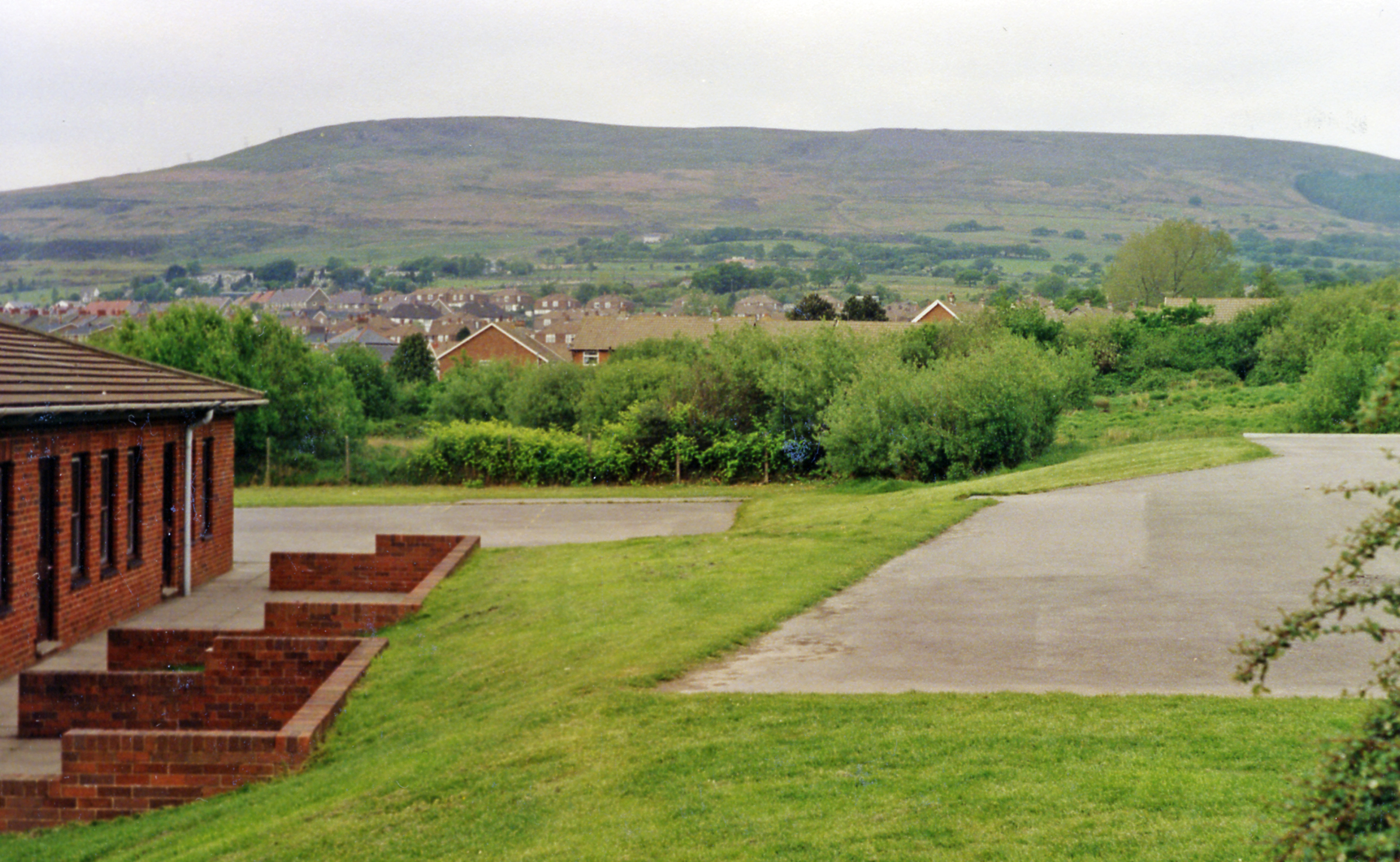
- The site of the station, looking northeast from Garth, in 1990

General information
- Location: Cwmdu, Glamorganshire; Wales
- Coordinates: 51.6064°N 3.6404°W
- Grid reference: SS865910
- Platforms: 1

Other information
- Status: Disused

History
- Original company: Great Western Railway
- Pre-grouping: Great Western Railway
- Post-grouping: Great Western Railway

Key dates
- 9 June 1913: Opened
- 12 September 1932: closed for passengers
- 1964: Closed to goods
Location

Cwmdu railway station served the hamlet of Cwmdu, in the historical county of Glamorganshire, Wales, from 1913 to 1932 on the Port Talbot Railway.

== History ==
The station was opened on 9 June 1913 by the Great Western Railway. It replaced the old Garth station to the south. It closed to passengers on 12 September 1932 and closed to goods in 1964.

Preceding station	Disused railways	Following station
Maesteg (Neath Road); Line and station closed	Great Western Railway; Port Talbot Railway and Docks Company	Lletty Brongu; Line and station closed
