= Maesteg (Neath Road) railway station =

Disused railway station in Maesteg, Bridgend County Borough

Maesteg (Neath Road)

General information
- Location: Maesteg, Bridgend County Borough; Wales
- Coordinates: 51.6076°N 3.6639°W
- Grid reference: SS848911
- Platforms: 2

Other information
- Status: Disused

History
- Original company: Port Talbot Railway
- Post-grouping: Great Western Railway

Key dates
- 14 February 1898: Opened as Maesteg
- 1 July 1924: Name changed to Maesteg Neath Road
- 11 September 1933: Closed to passengers
- 1964: Closed completely
Location

Maesteg (Neath Road) railway station served the town of Maesteg, Glamorgan, Wales from 1898 to 1964 on the Llynvi and Ogmore Railway.

== History ==
The station opened as Maesteg on 14 February 1898 by the Port Talbot Railway. Its name was changed to Maesteg Neath Road on 1 July 1924. It closed to passengers on 11 September 1933 and closed completely in 1964.

Preceding station	Disused railways	Following station
Bryn; Line and station closed	Port Talbot Railway; Llynvi and Ogmore Railway	Cwmdu; Line and station closed
