= Lletty Brongu railway station =

Disused railway station in Lletty Brongu, Bridgend County Borough

Coordinates: 51.5862°N 3.6161°W

Lletty Brongu

General information
- Location: Lletty Brongu, Glamorganshire; Wales

Other information
- Status: Disused

History
- Original company: Port Talbot Railway and Docks Company
- Pre-grouping: Great Western Railway
- Post-grouping: Great Western Railway

Key dates
- 14 February 1898: Opened
- 12 September 1932: Closed

Lletty Brongu railway station served the hamlet of Lletty Brongu, in the historical county of Glamorganshire, Wales, from 1898 to 1932 on the Port Talbot Railway.

== History ==
The station was opened on 14 February 1898 by the Port Talbot Railway and Docks Company. It closed on 12 September 1932.

Preceding station	Disused railways	Following station
Cwmdu; Line and station closed	Port Talbot Railway	Pontyrhyl; Line and station closed
