= Froissy Dompierre Light Railway =

French heritage railway; last World War I trench railway

Coordinates: 49°55′24″N 2°43′45″E

Froissy Dompierre Light Railway (P'tit Train de la Haute Somme)
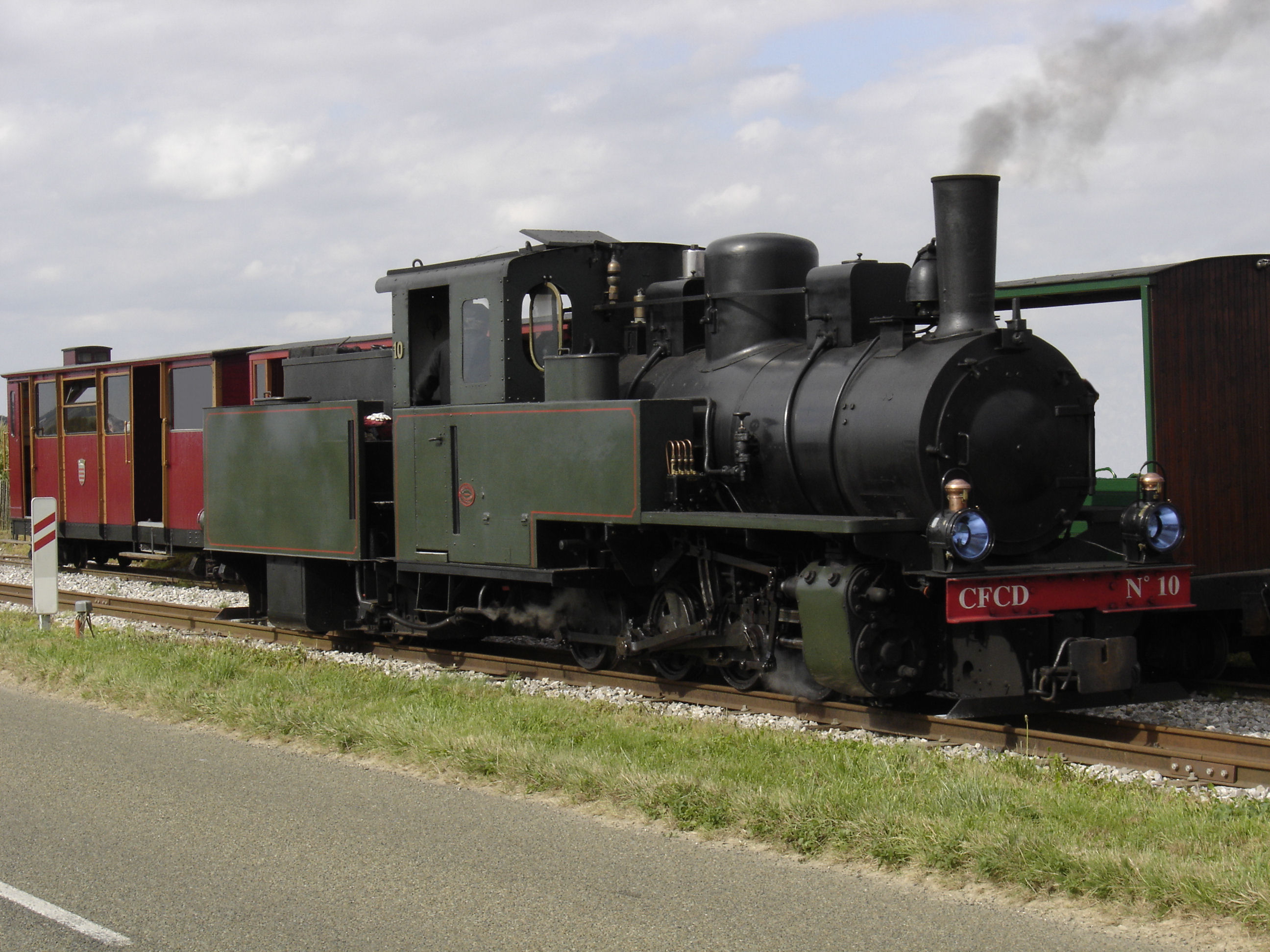
- Franco-Belge 0-8-0 type KDL
- Locale: France
- Terminus: Froissy - Dompierre

Commercial operations
- Name: Le P'tit train de la Haute Somme
- Built by: British and French armies
- Original gauge: 600 mm (1 ft 11 5/8 in)

Preserved operations
- Operated by: APPEVA (Association Picarde pour la Préservation et l'Entretien des Véhicules Anciens)
- Stations: 4
- Length: 7 kilometres (4.3 mi)
- Preserved gauge: 600 mm (1 ft 11 5/8 in)

Commercial history
- Opened: 1916
- Closed: 1972

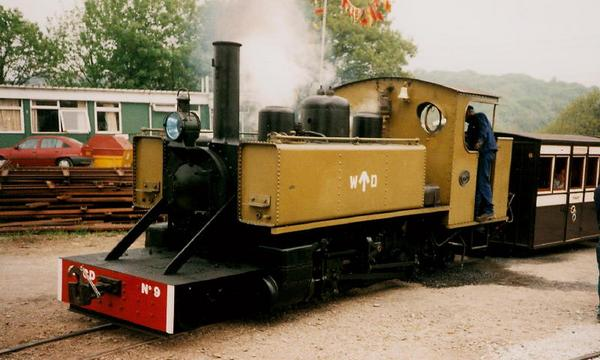
Alco WDLR locomotive at the Ffestiniog Railway 1995 gala.

The Froissy Dompierre Light Railway (French: Chemin de fer Froissy-Dompierre, CFCD) is a 600 mm (1 ft 11 5/8 in) narrow gauge light railway running from Froissy (a hamlet of La Neuville-lès-Bray) to Dompierre-Becquincourt, through Cappy, in the Somme department, France. It is run as a heritage railway by APPEVA (Association Picarde pour la Préservation et l'Entretien des Véhicules Anciens) and is also known as P'tit Train de la Haute Somme. It is the last survivor of the 600 mm (1 ft 11 5/8 in) narrow gauge trench railways of the World War I battlefields.

== History ==
Service Map in 1923

In 1915, the French Army built a railway along the Somme Canal between Péronne and Froissy. Between 1916 and 1918 the railway was at the Allied front line, and transporting 1,500 tonnes of materials daily. At Froissy, the metre gauge Réseau Albert connected with the CFCD.

After the war, the railway was used in assisting with the reconstruction and also to bring food into the villages it served. New lines were laid including a zig-zag to reach the Santerre Plateau. The line was by this time being used for the transportation of sugar beet to the sugar refinery in Dompierre. In 1927, a further deviation was built to avoid Cappy Port, which required a 300 metres (330 yd) tunnel. The line was extended to Chaulnes in 1931. The line escaped World War II with little damage, although one train of molasses was attacked by a British aircraft. Two Coferna diesel locomotives were acquired in 1942, working alongside the Feldbahn 0-8-0s. The steam locomotives were retired in 1946 and replaced by three Plymouth loco-tracteurs. The extensions to Péronne and Chaulnes had been removed by 1954 and increased competition from road traffic meant that the line ceased operations in 1972, by which time a preservation society had already started operations.

== Preservation ==
APPEVA was formed in 1970 with the aim of preserving a 600 mm (1 ft 11 5/8 in) narrow gauge railway as a working museum. The CFCD was a good location, being between Paris and Lille near A1 motorway and close to Amiens. APPEVA operated its first train in June 1971 between Cappy and Froissy, a distance of 1 kilometre (1,100 yd; 0.62 mi). By 1974 the line was operating as far as the top of the zig-zag and in 1976 the full line to Dompierre was opened to traffic, following improvements to the level crossing on the Santerre Plateau. In 1996, a new museum was opened in Froissy.

The line starts from the Froissy terminus and follows the towpath along the Somme canal to the little station of Cappy. It then runs through a curved tunnel more than 200 metres (220 yd) long followed by a bridge to cross the road from Cappy to Chuignes and a zig zag which was built after World War I to allow locomotives to climb the very steep slope towards the Santerre upland area. Once on the Santerre, the line runs on the side of the road to Dompierre. The terminus is located near the former sugar refinery of Dompierre.

APPEVA owns or has in store 9 steam locomotives, of which three are operating and some are considered as a Monument historique, and 24 diesel engines. The Froissy Dompierre Railway operates from April till the end of September, on Sundays and holidays, and every day of the week (except Monday) in July and August. The journey between the Froissy museum and the Dompierre terminus takes one hour. The CFCD is twinned with the Leighton Buzzard Light Railway.

APPEVA publishes a monthly magazine in French devoted to narrow gauge railways and touristic railways (Standard, metric and narrow gauge) called Voie Étroite.

== Museum ==
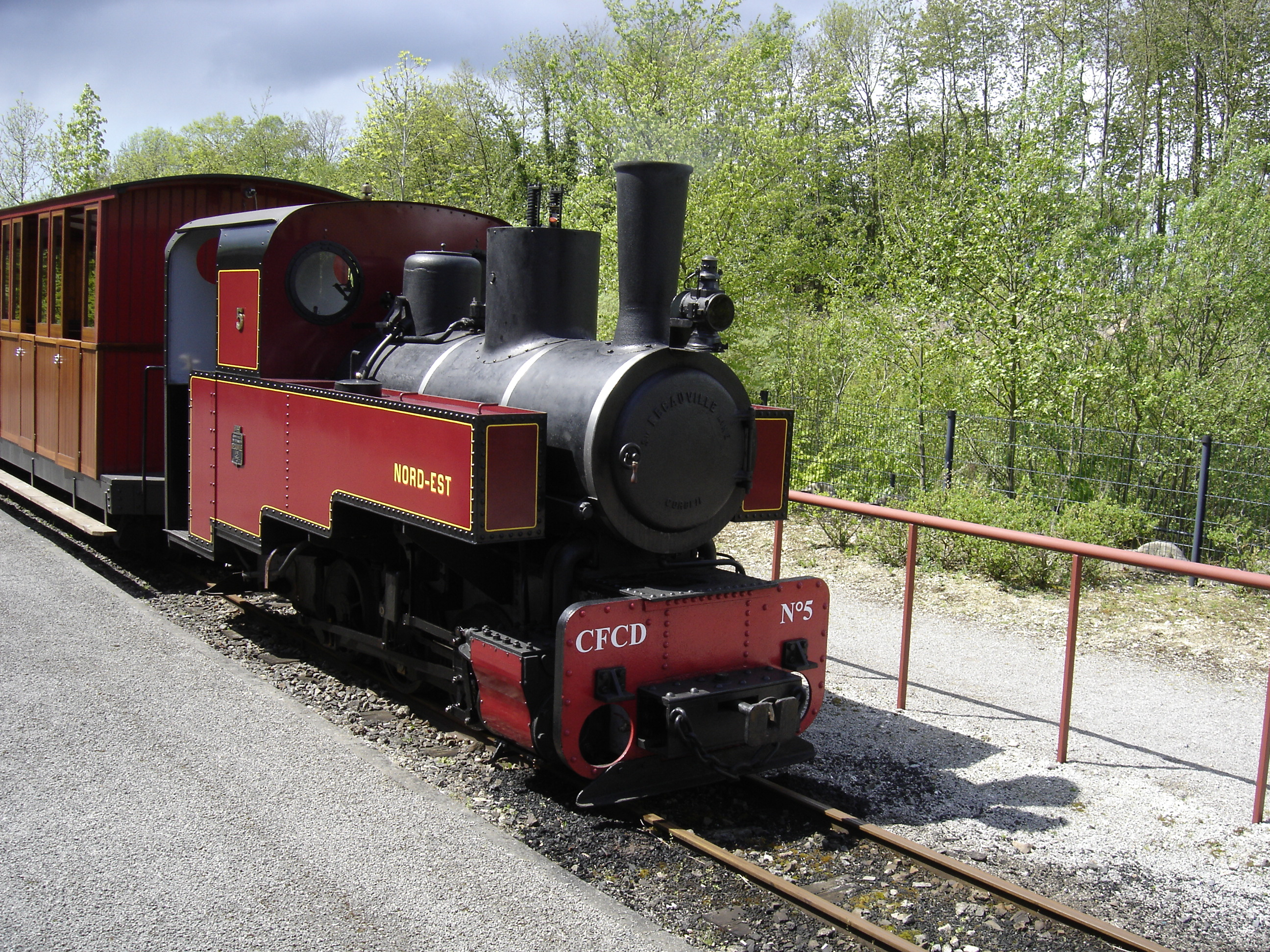
0-6-0 WT Decauville

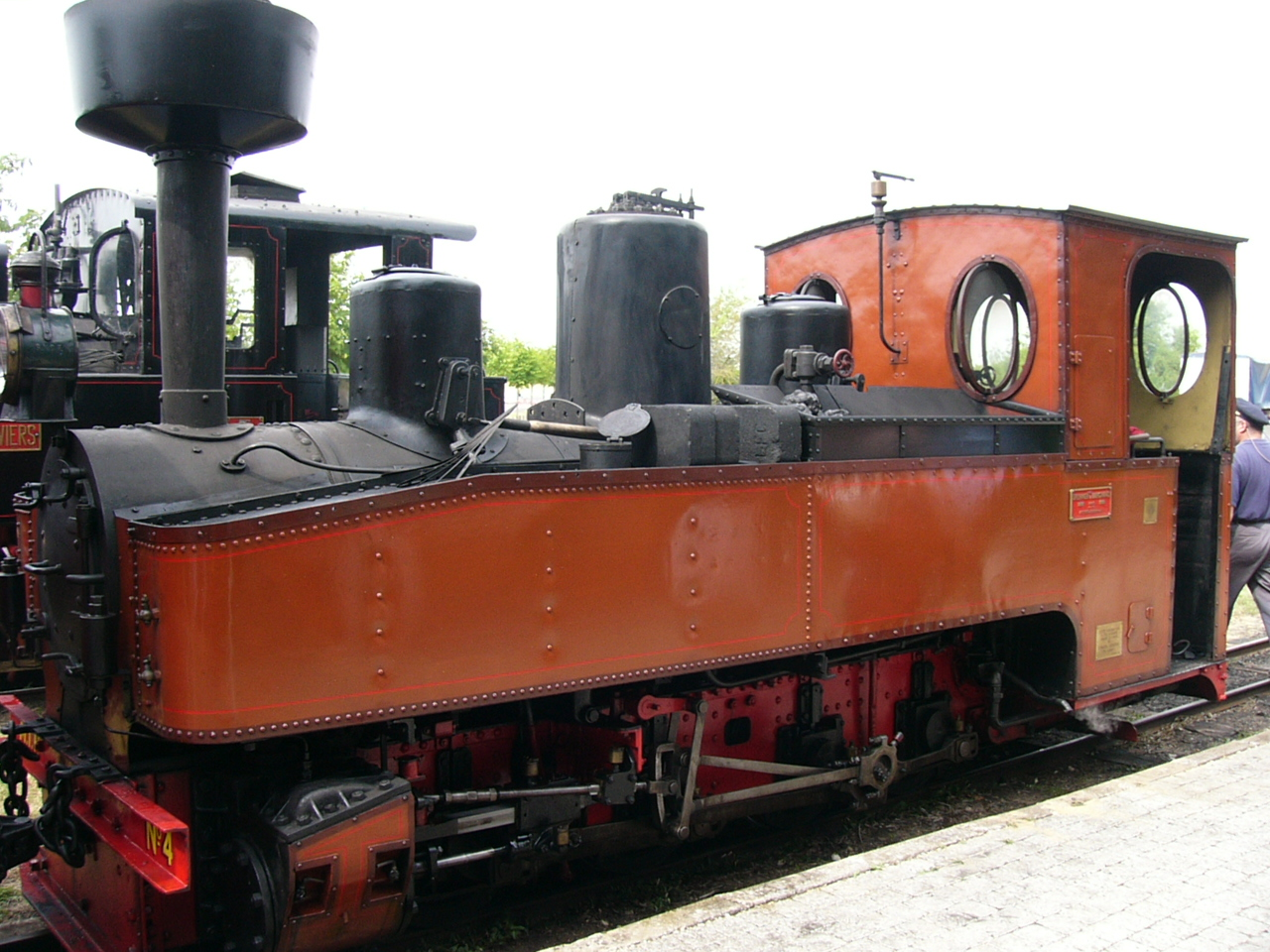
Henschel No. 15311

The Musée des chemins de fer Militaires et Industriels (Military and Industrial Railways Museum), located near the line terminus in the hamlet of Froissy (French commune of La Neuville-lès-Bray), features a large collection of 600 mm (1 ft 11 5/8 in) gauge railway material, steam engines, diesel engines and wagons, in an 1,800 m^{2} (19,000 sq ft) exhibition hall inaugurated in 1996.

It also features an interesting Fairbanks-Morse speeder of 1917, used by the US Army.

== Rolling stock ==
=== Steam locomotives ===
No.	Name	Builder	Wheel Arrangement	Power	Works Number	Year built	Origin	Notes	Photo
1		Henschel	0-4-0T					Henschel N°23735 de 1937	
2		Neumeyer	0-4-0T					Neumeyer N°19 of 1922	
3		Decauville	0-6-0T	50 hp (37 kW)	1825	1928	Port de Bordeaux	Decauville N°1825 of 1928, Type Progrès	
4		Krauss	0-8-0T	70 hp (52 kW)	7373	1917	German Army	Type DFB. Operated till end of 2007.	
5		Decauville	0-6-0WT	50 hp (37 kW)	1652	1916	Ex-Réseau Nord-Est (Reims)	Type 17. In working order.	
7	Geneviève	Borsig	0-8-0T+T	50 hp (37 kW)	10334	1918	Poland	Type DFB. In working order.	
8		Vulcan, Stettin	0-8-0T	150 hp (110 kW) to 180 hp (130 kW)	3852	1925	Ex Deutsche Reichsbahn No 99 3461, Ex Mecklenburg-Pommersche Bahn No 9.	Prototype. Under restoration to working order (goal is 2011).	
9		Alco-Cooke	2-6-2T					RL 1257, N°57148 of 1916	
10		Franco-Belge	0-8-0T+T	250 hp (190 kW) to 300 hp (220 kW)	2836	1945	Ex Sucreries Ternynck, Coucy-le-Château and TPT No. 4-14.	Type KDL (Kriegsdampflokomotive). In working order.	
11		Orenstein & Koppel	0-6-0T	about 100 hp (75 kW)	8083	1915	ex TPT No. 3-6.		
12		Orenstein & Koppel	0-10-0T	about 195 hp (145 kW)	8285	1917	ex TPT No. 5-3.		
13		Orenstein & Koppel	0-8-0T DFB	70 hp (52 kW)	8627	1918	Ex Sucreries Coucy-le-Château	Type DFB. On loan from AMTUIR	

=== Diesel locomotives ===
No.	Name	Builder	Wheel Arrangement	Power	Works Number	Year built	Origin	Notes	Photo
T23		Plymouth		75 hp (56 kW)	5117	1946		Loco-tracteur. One of the original CFCD locomotives.	
T24	Tatra	Société de Construction Ferroviaires et Navales (Coferna)		200 hp (150 kW)	122	1941		Diesel locomotive. Fitted with a 212 horsepower (158 kW) Tatra air-cooled engine, one of the original CFCD locomotives. In working order.	
T25	Iveco	Coferna		180 hp (130 kW)	123	1941		Diesel locomotive. Fitted with a 180 horsepower (130 kW) Iveco water-cooled engine, one of the original CFCD locomotives. In working order.	
T31		Billard		100 hp (75 kW)	233 T75 G	1958		Diesel locomotive. In working order.	
T32	Simplex	Motor Rail Ltd		40 hp (30 kW)	588/191	1917		Tractor.	
T37	Simplex	Motor Rail Ltd		20 hp (15 kW)	7433	1939		Tractor. In working order.	
T33		Baldwin	0-4-0D	50 hp (37 kW)	49192	1917		Tractor.	
T36		Baldwin		50 hp (37 kW)	49966	1917		Tractor.	
T29		Socofer		40 hp (30 kW)	333 SCF 303	1968		Tractor. In working order.	
	Speeder	Fairbanks-Morse				1917		Draisine	

=== Passenger stock ===
The CFCD operates a variety of open and closed passenger stock, most of which is built on chassis of freight vehicles dating from World War I.

=== Freight stock ===
The CFCD has a variety of goods wagons, both open and closed, that date from World War I, and also examples of wagons from the industrial use of the line after World War I.

=== Visiting locomotives ===
During the 40th anniversary of preservation of the line in 2011, three British-based locomotives visited, including Darjeeling Himalayan Railway DHR 778.

== See also ==
- Narrow gauge railway
