= Cappy, Somme =

Cappy
- Commune
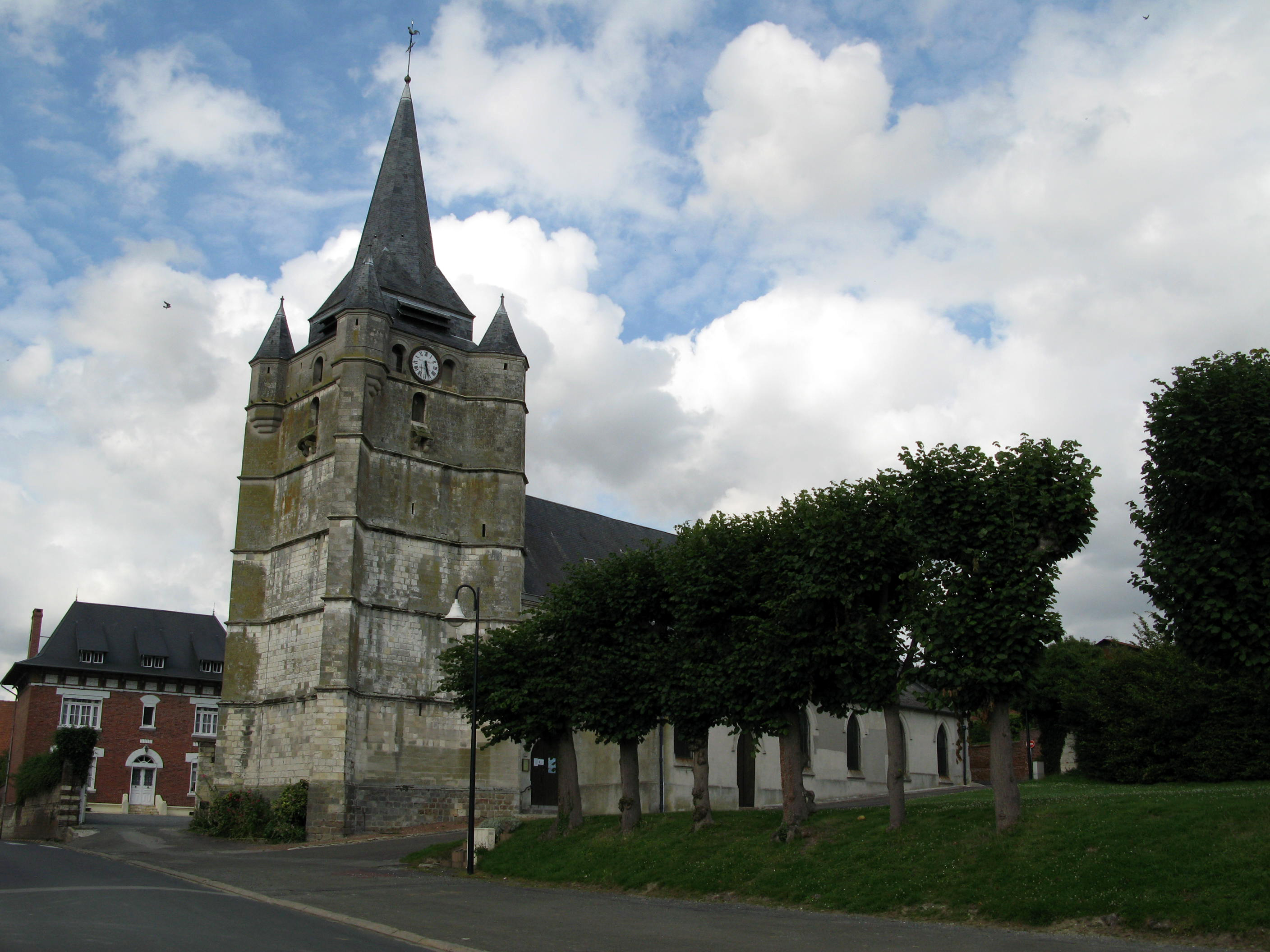
- The church in Cappy

- Coat of arms
- Location of Cappy
- Location within France Location within Hauts-de-France
- Coordinates: 49°55′44″N 2°45′32″E
- Country: France
- Region: Hauts-de-France
- Department: Somme
- Arrondissement: Péronne
- Canton: Albert
- Intercommunality: Pays du Coquelicot

Government
  - Mayor (2020–2026): Gérard Legrand
- Area^{1}: 11.91 km^{2} (4.60 sq mi)
- Elevation: 65 m (213 ft)
- Highest elevation: 96 m (315 ft)
- Lowest elevation: 36 m (118 ft)
- Population (2023): 546
  - Density: 45.8/km^{2} (119/sq mi)
- Time zone: UTC+01:00 (CET)
  - Summer (DST): UTC+02:00 (CEST)
- INSEE/Postal code: 80172 /80340
- ^{1} French Land Register data, which excludes lakes, ponds, glaciers > 1 km^{2} (0.386 sq mi or 247 acres) and river estuaries.

Cappy (French pronunciation: [kapi]; Picard: Capin) is a commune in the Somme department in Hauts-de-France in northern France.

== Geography ==
Cappy is situated on the D1 road, some 20 miles (32 km) east of Amiens, by the banks of the river Somme.

== History ==
- Two Roman villas have been found within the boundaries of the commune.
- Known as "Capiacum" in 887, from the earlier name "Caput Loci" which suggests a fortress was built to defend the passage of the Somme.
- In the 10th century, the village had a priory. Robert I of Péronne was the seigneur.
- In 1260, Cappy was one of 25 Picardie towns to receive its charter from Louis IX.
- In 1373, The priory, the village and the château were destroyed by the Earl of Warwick.
- The village was also pillaged during the wars with Spain.

== Population ==
Historical population
Year	Pop.	±% p.a.
1968	549	—
1975	513	−0.96%
1982	510	−0.08%
1990	484	−0.65%
1999	485	+0.02%
2007	543	+1.42%
2012	529	−0.52%
2017	535	+0.23%
2023	546	+0.34%
Source: INSEE

== Monuments ==
- Saint-Nicolas church, built in the lower village. The tower dates from 1654. Partially rebuilt in 1920, after the battles of 1916.
- The railway museum 'Chemin de fer Froissy-Dompierre'.

== See also ==
- Froissy Dompierre Light Railway
- Communes of the Somme department
