= Neumeyer =

Fritz Neumeyer AG was a German engineering firm that built steam engines during a brief period of its history. It was based in Munich in the Bavaria in Germany.

== History ==
The company was created in 1903 by Fritz Neumeyer (10. September 1875, + 10. September 1935) in Nuremberg.

The company produced narrow-gauge steam engines for two years, from December 1, 1922 to August 24, 1924 in its factory in Freimann, an area of Munich. Only 43 engines were produced during the short activity of the company.

== Surviving models ==
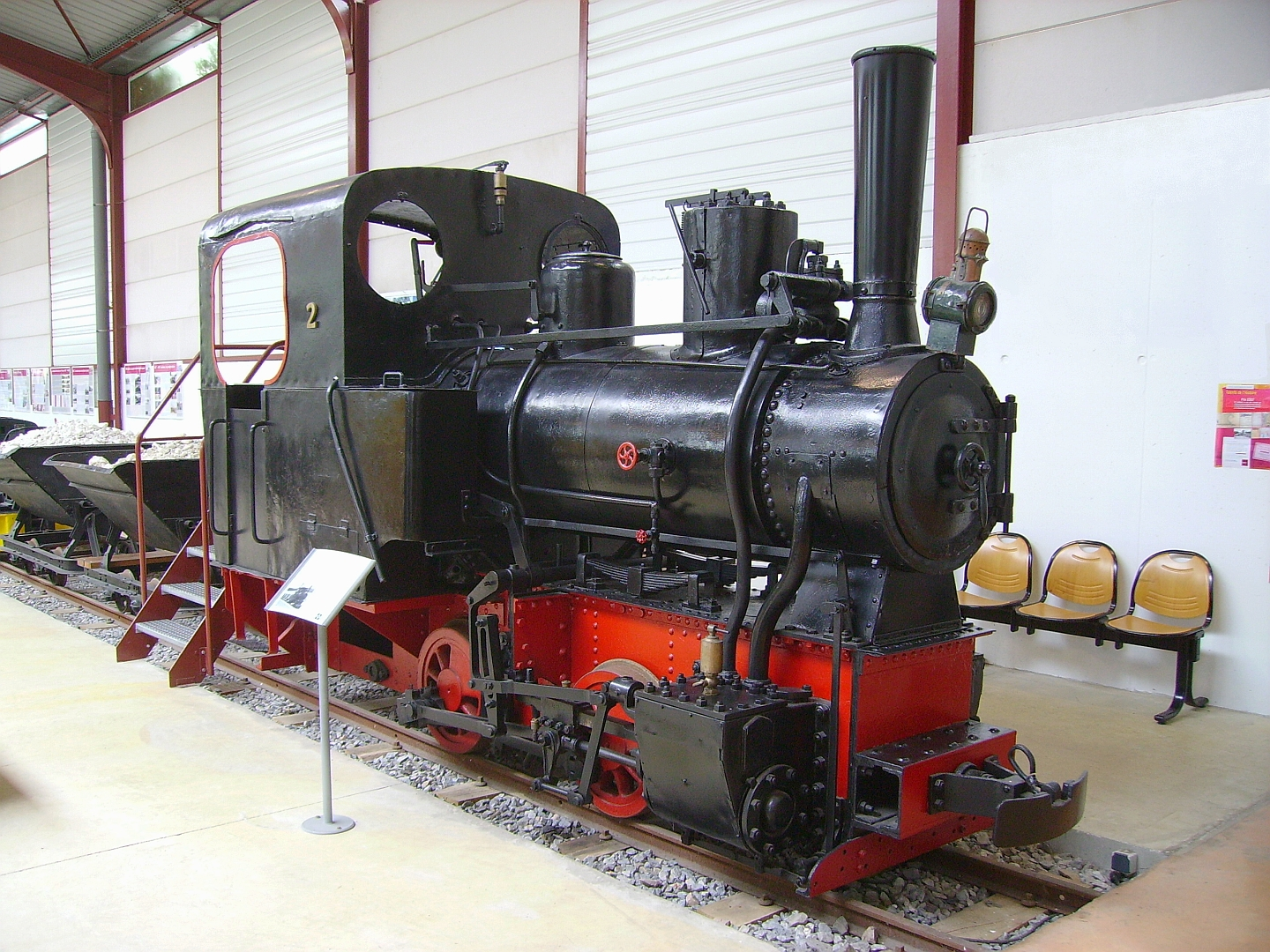
Neumeyer 0-4-0 T Nr. 19 of the Froissy Dompierre Light Railway

- One model (0-4-0 T Nr. 19 from 1922) in static display in Grez-sur-Loing, France.
- One model (0-4-0 T Nr. 7 from 1923) at the Kissing Garten Bahn in Hagen.
