= La Neuville-lès-Bray =

- Commune
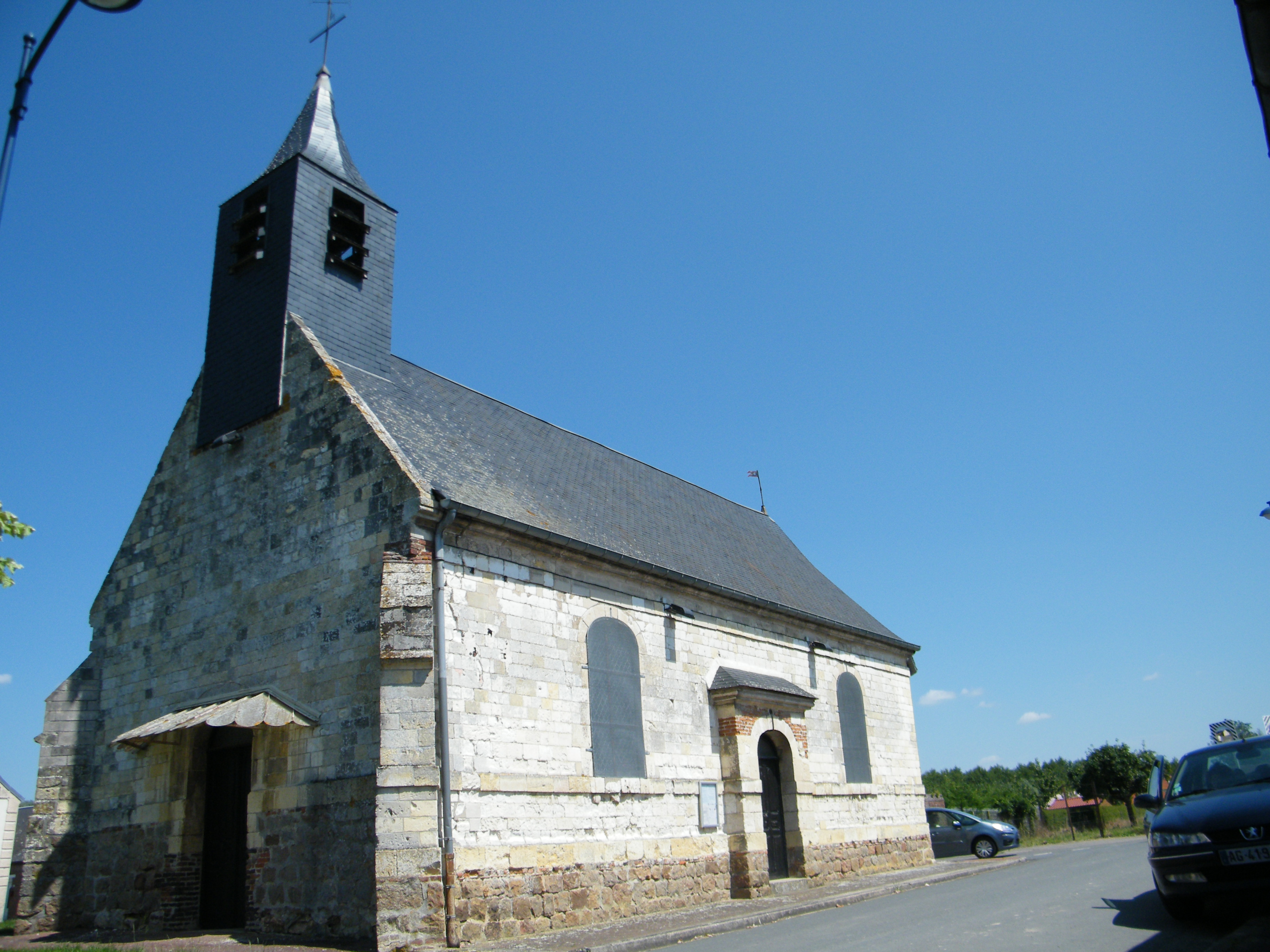
- The church in La Neuville-lès-Bray
- Location of La Neuville-lès-Bray
- Location within France Location within Hauts-de-France
- Coordinates: 49°56′01″N 2°43′09″E
- Country: France
- Region: Hauts-de-France
- Department: Somme
- Arrondissement: Péronne
- Canton: Albert
- Intercommunality: Pays du Coquelicot

Government
  - Mayor (2020–2026): Benoit Dubuisson
- Area^{1}: 4.03 km^{2} (1.56 sq mi)
- Elevation: 30 m (98 ft)
- Highest elevation: 85 m (279 ft)
- Lowest elevation: 32 m (105 ft)
- Population (2023): 263
  - Density: 65.3/km^{2} (169/sq mi)
- Time zone: UTC+01:00 (CET)
  - Summer (DST): UTC+02:00 (CEST)
- INSEE/Postal code: 80593 /80340
- ^{1} French Land Register data, which excludes lakes, ponds, glaciers > 1 km^{2} (0.386 sq mi or 247 acres) and river estuaries.

La Neuville-lès-Bray (French pronunciation: [la nøvil lɛ bʁɛ], literally La Neuville near Bray) is a commune in the Somme department in Hauts-de-France in northern France.

== Geography ==
The commune is situated on the D329 road, on the banks of the river Somme, opposite Bray-sur-Somme, 29 kilometres (18 mi) east of Amiens.

== Population ==
Historical population
Year	Pop.	±% p.a.
1968	175	—
1975	201	+2.00%
1982	214	+0.90%
1990	215	+0.06%
1999	260	+2.13%
2007	274	+0.66%
2012	269	−0.37%
2017	266	−0.22%
2023	263	−0.19%
Source: INSEE

== Places of interest ==
- Froissy Dompierre Light Railway and museum at nearby Froissy.

== See also ==
- Froissy (La Neuville-lès-Bray)
- Communes of the Somme department
