= Froissy (La Neuville-lès-Bray) =

- Village
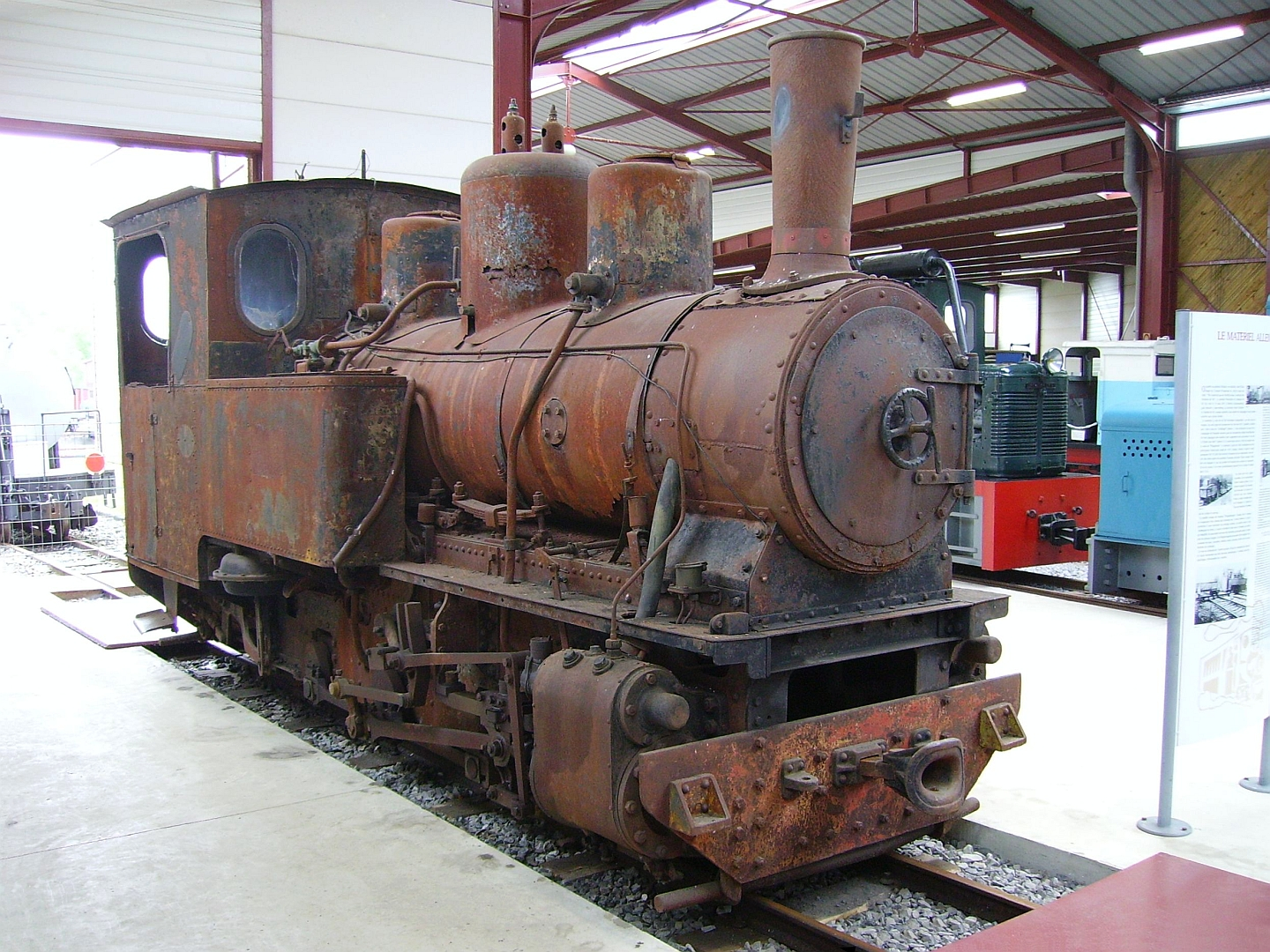
- 050T Orenstein & Koppel locomotive preserved in the railway museum of Froissy

- Location within France Location within Hauts-de-France
- Coordinates: 49°55′22″N 2°43′33″E
- Country: France
- Region: Hauts-de-France
- Department: Somme
- Arrondissement: Péronne
- Canton: Albert
- Intercommunality: Pays du Coquelicot
- Municipality: La Neuville-lès-Bray
- Elevation: 80 m (260 ft)
- Time zone: UTC+1 (CET)
  - Summer (DST): UTC+2 (CEST)
- Postal code: 80340

Froissy (French pronunciation: [fʁwasi]) is a village and hameau, part of the municipality (commune) of La Neuville-lès-Bray, in the department of Somme, Hauts-de-France, northern France.

== Geography ==
The village is located in a meander of the river Somme, few km in south of La Neuville-lès-Bray and Bray-sur-Somme. It is crossed in the middle by the Canal de la Somme and, in south-east of it, is located a railway station of a touristic railway. Froissy is 13 km (8.1 mi) from Albert, 27 km (17 mi) from Péronne, 44 km (27 mi) from Amiens, 109 km (68 mi) from Lille and 150 km (93 mi) from Paris.

Village's main roads are the Route de Roye, part of the D329 departmental road, and Rue du Port, running through the northern shore of the canal.

== Main sights ==
Froissy is the western terminus of the Froissy Dompierre Light Railway (also named P'tit Train de la Haute Somme), a heritage and touristic narrow gauge railway. In Froissy station is located a museum, the Musée des chemins de fer Militaires et Industriels (Military and Industrial railways Museum).
