= Bryn railway station (Glamorgan) =

Disused railway station in Bryn, Neath Port Talbot

Bryn
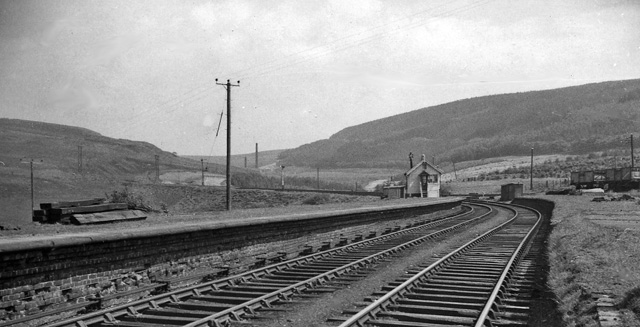
- The station in 1962

General information
- Location: Bryn, Glamorganshire; Wales
- Coordinates: 51.6135°N 3.7085°W
- Grid reference: SS818919

Other information
- Status: Disused

History
- Original company: Port Talbot Railway and Docks Company
- Pre-grouping: Great Western Railway
- Post-grouping: Great Western Railway

Key dates
- 14 February 1898: Opened
- 11 September 1933: Closed to passengers
- 31 August 1964: Closed to goods
Location

Bryn railway station served the village of Bryn, Neath Port Talbot, Wales, from 1898 to 1964 on the Port Talbot Railway.

== History ==
The station was opened on 14 February 1898 by the Port Talbot Railway and Docks Company. It closed to passengers on 11 September 1933 and closed to goods on 31 August 1964.

Preceding station	Disused railways	Following station
Port Talbot General; Line closed, station open	Port Talbot Railway and Docks Company; Port Talbot Railway	Maesteg (Neath Road); Line and station closed
