= 0-8-2 =

Locomotive wheel arrangement

Under the Whyte notation for the classification of steam locomotives, 0-8-2 represents the wheel arrangement of no leading wheels, eight powered and coupled driving wheels on four axles, and two trailing wheels on one axle (usually in a trailing truck).

Other equivalent classifications are: UIC classification (also known as German classification and Italian classification): D1, French classification: 041, Turkish classification: 45, Swiss classification: 4/5.

== Usage ==
This has been a relatively unusual wheel arrangement on mainline railways.

=== United Kingdom ===
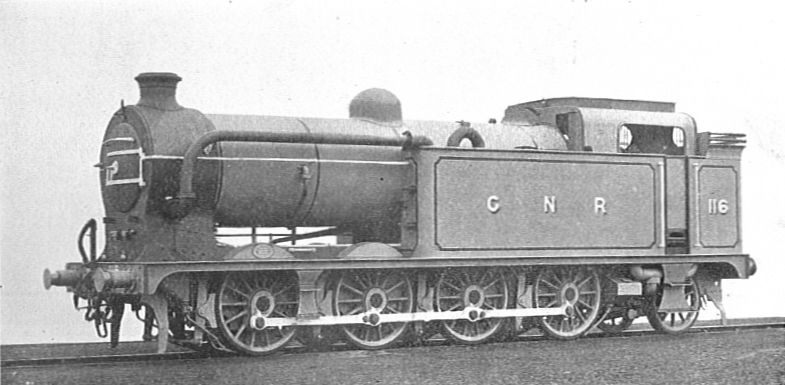
GNR Class L1 locomotive

In the United Kingdom, a number of tank locomotive designs were built of the 0-8-2 type, including the London and North Eastern Railway (LNER) R1 class, designed by Henry A. Ivatt and built originally for the Great Northern Railway as their class L1. These locomotives were intended for suburban passenger service, but did not prove satisfactory, so they ended up on freight service.

Other examples include the LNWR 1185 Class and the Port Talbot Railway 0-8-2T (Cooke) and Port Talbot Railway 0-8-2T (Sharp Stewart).

=== Australia ===
Dorrigo Steam Railway and Museum has preserved Avonside 0-8-2 Tank Locomotive number 14, formerly operated by South Maitland Railways collieries line in the Hunter Valley of N.S.W. Number 14 is operational, it was built in 1909 in Bristol. The design combination of this 0-8-2 tank Locomotive and the N.S.W. Government Railways 50 class 2-8-0, produced the South Maitland Railways 10 class 2-8-2 Tank Locomotives. Number 14 is the only 0-8-2 in Australia.

=== North America ===
The 0-8-2 was not a common wheel arrangement. In North America, its use was confined to 2-8-2 "Mikado" types assigned to switcher roles; the lead truck was often removed to give more weight on drivers, a guiding truck not being needed at slow speed. However, the Illinois Central rebuilt some of their 2-8-2s into 0-8-2s for use in Markham Yard in Chicago, Illinois.

=== Narrow-gauge railways ===
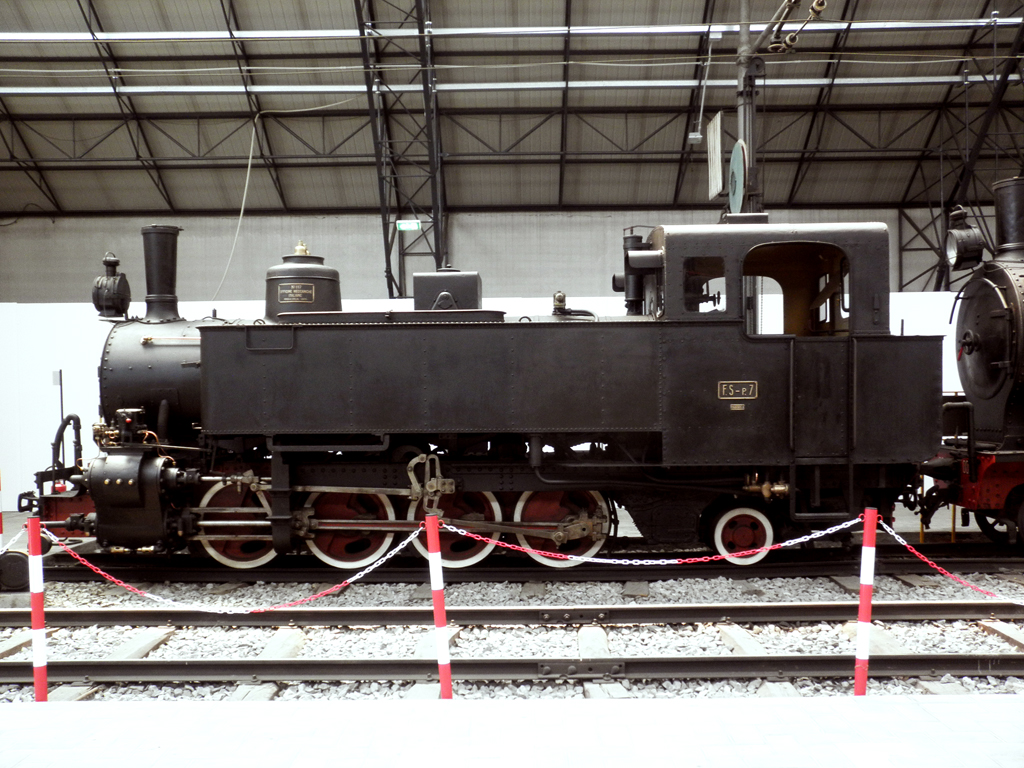
Italian narrow-gauge 0-8-2T

The arrangement has proved a little more popular on narrow-gauge and minimum-gauge lines, where the lack of leading wheels was less important due to the relatively slow operating speeds.

0-8-2 locomotives operate, for example, on the Zillertalbahn in Austria. The X class locomotives of the metre-gauge Nilgiri Mountain Railway in the Nilgiri Hills of southern India has a class 0-8-2T rack and pinion compound locomotives built by the Swiss Locomotive and Machine Works, Winterthur.

=== Minimum-gauge railways ===
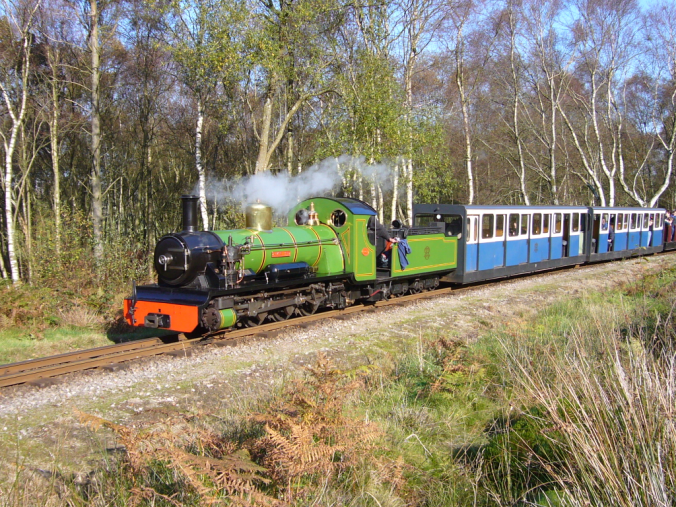
River Irt

One Ravenglass and Eskdale Railway, 0-8-0T locomotive was rebuilt in 1927, as an 0-8-2 tender locomotive named River Irt. It has remained in traffic on passenger duties ever since and is now the oldest working 15 inch gauge locomotive in the world.
