= Port Talbot Railway 0-8-2T (Sharp Stewart) =

Sharp Stewart 0-8-2T
Type and origin
- Power type: Steam
- Designer: Sharp, Stewart & Co.
- Builder: Sharp, Stewart & Co.
- Serial number: 4794–4796
- Build date: 1901
- Total produced: 3
Specifications
- Configuration
  - Whyte: 0-8-2T
- Gauge: 4 ft 8 1/2 in (1,435 mm)
- Driver dia.: 4 ft 3 in (1.295 m)
- Loco weight: 75.75 long tons (76.97 t; 84.84 short tons)
- Fuel type: coal
- Boiler pressure: 180 psi (1,200 kPa)
- Cylinders: Two, outside
- Cylinder size: 20 in × 26 in (508 mm × 660 mm)
Performance figures
- Tractive effort: 31,200 lbf (139 kN)

The Sharp Stewart 0-8-2T locomotives were 0-8-2T steam tank locomotives designed and built by Sharp, Stewart and Company for the Port Talbot Railway and Docks Company, south Wales. Three were built in 1901, works nos. 4794 - 4796. They were numbered 17-19 and became Great Western Railway numbers 1358–1360.

These were unusually large locomotives for their time and place. Most of the railways of South Wales relied on 0-6-2T tank locomotives.

Number 1360 was withdrawn in November 1926, followed by 1359 in December 1935. Number 1358 survived to be taken over by British Railways on 1 January 1948 but was withdrawn on 29 February 1948. All three locomotives were scrapped.

== See also ==
- Port Talbot Railway 0-8-2T (Cooke)
- Port Talbot Railway 0-6-2T (Stephenson)
- Locomotives of the Great Western Railway

== Sources ==
- Rail UK database entry for 1358
