= GNR Class L1 =

Class of British steam locomotives

GNR Class L1 LNER Class R1
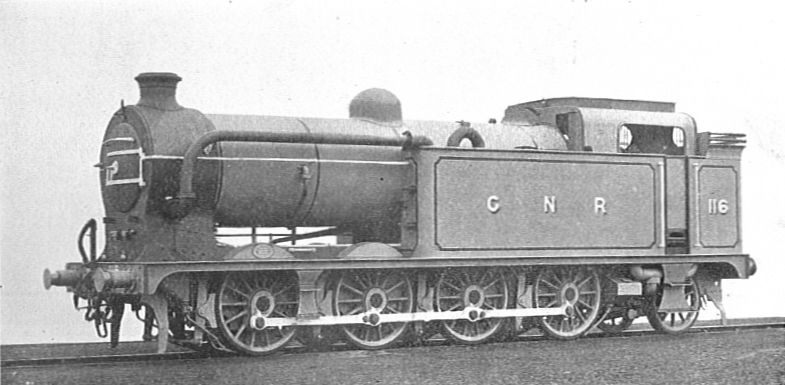
- GNR Class L1 0-8-2T locomotive
Type and origin
- Power type: Steam
- Designer: Henry Ivatt
- Builder: Doncaster Works
- Serial number: 1004, 1056–1065, 1097–1106, 1119–1138
- Build date: 1903–1906
- Total produced: 41
Specifications
- Configuration
  - Whyte: 0-8-2T
  - UIC: D1 n2t
- Gauge: 4 ft 8 1/2 in (1,435 mm)
- Driver dia.: 4 ft 8 in (1.42 m)
- Trailing dia.: 3 ft 8 in (1.12 m)
- Length: 38 ft 7 1/4 in (11.767 m)
- Loco weight: 71.35 long tons (72.49 t)
- Fuel type: Coal
- Fuel capacity: 2.5 long tons (2.5 t)
- Water cap.: 1,500 imp gal (6,800 L; 1,800 US gal)
- Boiler pressure: 175 psi (1.21 MPa)
- Cylinders: Two, inside
- Cylinder size: 20 in × 26 in (510 mm × 660 mm)
Performance figures
- Tractive effort: 27,626 lbf (122.89 kN)
Career
- Operators: Great Northern Railway; → London and North Eastern Railway
- Numbers: 116–156
- Withdrawn: 1927–1934
- Disposition: All scrapped

The Great Northern Railway (GNR) Class L1 (LNER Class R1) was a 0-8-2T side tank steam locomotive designed by Henry Ivatt. It was originally designed for suburban passenger traffic on the Metropolitan City Lines.

A prototype was built in 1903, but it was overweight, so it was rebuilt with a smaller boiler and shorter side tanks. Ten more engines were then built to this modified design. During the "small boiler" era, the cylinders were lined to 18" to match the boilers.

In 1905 and 1906, thirty more engines were built for working goods trains in the West Riding of Yorkshire. The original eleven engines were not a great success on passenger services so, in 1907, they were moved to the West Riding for goods work.

== Condensing apparatus ==
The first eleven locomotives were fitted with condensing apparatus for working in tunnels. The thirty built for the West Riding were probably not so fitted, but this is subject to confirmation. It is not known whether the condensing apparatus was removed from the original eleven when they were moved to the West Riding.

== Modifications ==
Between 1909 and 1926 the locomotives were gradually rebuilt with larger boilers to the original specification. Seven locomotives had superheaters fitted and, on these, the working pressure was reduced to 170 psi.

== Proposed diesel conversion ==
In 1932 there was a proposal to convert some of the locomotives to diesel power. The prime mover would have been an 8-cylinder diesel engine of 400 horsepower, driving a 4-cylinder air compressor to charge an air reservoir. Compressed air from the reservoir would have been heated, both by the diesel exhaust and by steam from an oil-fired steam generator, and would then have entered the locomotive's original cylinders at about 150 psi. The use of steam to heat the air is reminiscent of the Mekarski system. This diesel-pneumatic proposal never became a reality but a German one of 1929 did.

== Withdrawal ==
The class was all withdrawn and scrapped between 1927 and 1934.
