= Bryan Station, Lexington, Kentucky =

Coordinates: 38.0622°N 84.4567°W

Bryan Station
- Neighborhood of Lexington, Kentucky
- Interactive map of Bryan Station
- Country: United States
- State: Kentucky
- County: Fayette
- City: Lexington

Area
  - Total: 2.0 sq mi (5.2 km^{2})
  - Land: 2.0 sq mi (5.2 km^{2})
  - Water: 0 sq mi (0.0 km^{2})

Population (2000)
  - Total: 5,323
  - Density: 2,650/sq mi (1,024/km^{2})
- Time zone: UTC-5 (Eastern (EST))
  - Summer (DST): UTC-4 (EDT)
- ZIP code: 40505
- Area code: 859

Bryan Station is a neighborhood in Northeast Lexington, Kentucky, United States. It is named after the nearby pioneer settlement by the same name located just 2 miles (3 km) outside the current edge of the city.

The neighborhood's boundaries are New Circle Road to the West, Old Paris Pike to the North, and Preakness Drive and Interstate 75 to the East. An abandoned railroad track between New Circle Road and I-75 separates it from the Eastland neighborhood to the South.

== Neighborhood statistics ==
- Area: 2.013 square miles (5.2 km^{2})
- Population: 5,323
- Population density: 2,645 people per square mile
- Median household income: $49,678.

== See also ==
- Bryan Station High School
