= Port Talbot Railway 0-8-2T (Cooke) =

Type and origin
- Power type: Steam
- Builder: Cooke Locomotive and Machine Works, USA
- Build date: 1899
- Total produced: 2
Specifications
- Configuration
  - Whyte: 0-8-2T
- Gauge: 4 ft 8 1/2 in (1,435 mm)
- Driver dia.: 4 ft 4 in (1.321 m)
- Loco weight: 75 long tons (76 t)
- Fuel type: Coal
- Water cap.: 2,000 imp gal (9,100 L; 2,400 US gal)
- Boiler pressure: 180 psi (1,200 kPa)
- Cylinders: Two, outside
- Cylinder size: 19 in × 24 in (480 mm × 610 mm)
- Valve gear: Stephenson
Performance figures
- Tractive effort: 25,490 lbf (113.4 kN)
Career
- Operators: Port Talbot Railway and Docks Company » Great Western Railway
- Withdrawn: 1928–1929

The Cooke 0-8-2T were two 0-8-2T steam tank locomotives built in 1899 for the Port Talbot Railway (PTR), South Wales. Their PTR numbers were 20 and 21 and they became Great Western Railway (GWR) nos. 1378 and 1379 in 1922.

The PTR obtained tenders from six British and three American companies and the winning tender was from the Cooke Locomotive and Machine Works of Paterson, New Jersey, United States. Cooke's London agents were Thomas W. Ford & Company of Palace Chambers, 9 Bridge Street, Westminster.

The locomotives were fairly British in appearance, but had some notable characteristics of American locomotive practice, such as bar frames, and the smokebox being a separate piece from the steam chest, the latter being a "saddle" connecting to the cylinders, upon which the former was mounted on top. Both were fitted with new taper boilers at the GWR's Swindon Works in 1908.

== Performance ==
The locomotives were required to haul a train of 300 tons up a bank of 1 in 40 at 12 mph (19 km/h) and 800 tons up a bank of 1 in 75 at the same speed. Initially the locomotives failed to meet these targets, but after some modifications the required performances were achieved.

On coal trains, one 0-8-2T replaced a pair of 0-6-2Ts and this resulted in a significant saving in fuel and labour costs. Coal consumption was 65 lb (29 kg) per mile for a 0-8-2T compared with 94 lb (43 kg) per mile for a pair of 0-6-2Ts.

== Further locomotives ==
The PTR had an option to buy three or five more locomotives from Cooke to the same design but it chose not to exercise this option. Instead, it bought three 0-8-2T from Sharp Stewart of Glasgow in 1901.

The two classes are easily distinguishable by their differences in framework and cylinders. The Cooke locomotives' cylinders were of distinctly American design practice, and were mounted horizontally, driving on the second axle, while the Sharp Stewart locomotive cylinders were slightly inclined, driving on the third axle.

== See also ==
- Locomotives of the Great Western Railway
- Port Talbot Railway 0-8-2T (Sharp Stewart)
- Port Talbot Railway 0-6-2T (Stephenson)
