= Port Talbot Railway and Docks Company =

Former British railway and dock company

The Port Talbot Railway and Docks Company (PTR&D) was formed in 1894 to secure the means of bringing minerals, chiefly coal, to the harbour in South Wales. It took over the docks at Port Talbot that had been operated by the Port Talbot Company. It opened its main line in 1897 and reached a connection with the Great Western Railway Garw Valley line the following year. A branch line to collieries near Tonmawr also opened in 1898. The lines were extremely steeply graded and operation was difficult and expensive, but the company was successful. Passenger operation on the main line started in 1898, but this was never a principal part of the business. For some time most of the passenger train service was operated by a railmotor that was the largest ever to work in the United Kingdom. Also in 1898 the Ogmore Valleys Extension (OVE) line, a part of the PTR&D, was opened. It had been projected as a defensive measure against competitive incursion, and it led from Margam Junction towards Tondu.

When the mineral activity in the area declined after 1960, so did the PTR&D system, and the OVE lines (dormant in 2017) and the dock lines at Port Talbot are the only remaining tracks in use.

The controlling shareholder in the company for many years was Emily Charlotte Talbot (1840-1918), an unusually powerful woman for the times.

== Port Talbot Dock Company ==
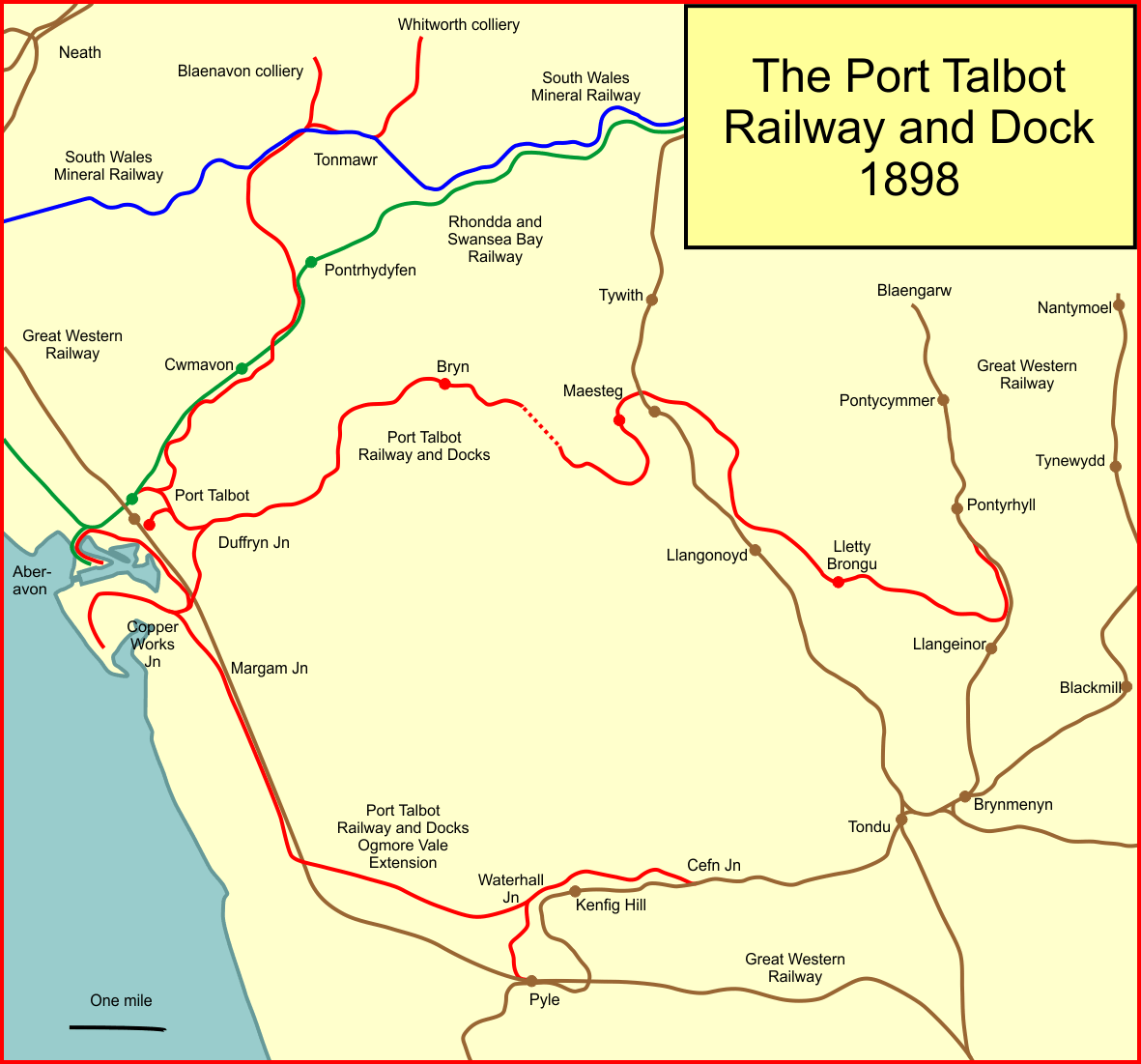
System map of the Port Talbot Railways and Docks

Christopher Rice Mansel Talbot inherited the Penrice and Margam estates in West Glamorgan in 1813. The Margam estate straddled the outcrop of the South Wales Coalfield, and had considerable mineral potential.

Transport of coal and other minerals away to market was hampered by the poor conditions at the nearby Aberavon harbour, and after a false start, the Aberavon Port and Harbour Act 1836 (6 & 7 Will. 4. c. xcviii) was obtained to carry out improvements, and to call the harbour Port Talbot. The works included straightening out the course of the River Avon towards the sea. In fact the scheme was grossly undercapitalised and there appear in addition to have been financial irregularities; the Port Talbot Company went into receivership in 1858, which lasted until matters were regularised in 1863.

In that year, a railway connection to the South Wales Railway was constructed, and improved appliances for the loading of coal to ships were installed. The branch line opened formally on 1 September 1864.

As time went, on Christopher Talbot became a major creditor of the company, as it failed to honour rent and debenture payments. When the company proposed improvements to the harbour in 1876 he obstructed most elements of the scheme, especially those involving major expenditure, and continued in that attitude to most proposals. The Rhondda and Swansea Bay Railway was building its line, destined to connect the Rhondda Fawr with Swansea Bay; the R&SBR wanted to develop Aberavon but Talbot resisted that. The matter continued without any progress, and as Talbot became older, he became even more difficult to negotiate with. Meanwhile the condition of the harbour deteriorated and ships' masters were unwilling to trade there because of the poor conditions.

In frustration, the R&SBR obtained an authorising act of Parliament, the Rhondda and Swansea Bay Railway Act 1890 (53 & 54 Vict. c. cxlv), permitting development of the harbour. Naturally the Port Talbot Company, as owners who were against the improvements, were given what amounted to a veto. However Talbot had died on 17 January 1890 at the age of 86, and his unmarried (Note: The significance of this is not sexist, but to indicate that she acted independently, without the supposed "guiding hand" of a husband, at a date when a woman in a business context was a remarkable rarity.) daughter Emily Charlotte Talbot (1840 – 1918) inherited his considerable wealth, nearly £6 million.

From this time, two major attempts were made to achieve a negotiated working arrangement between industrial promoters and Emily Talbot. The second would have involved the formation of a Port Talbot Docks and Railway company (as opposed to the actual, later Port Talbot Railway and Docks Company). Neither of the schemes came to reality.

== Formation of the Port Talbot Railway and Dock Company ==
Port Talbot Railway and Docks Act 1894
- Act of Parliament
- Parliament of the United Kingdom
- Long title: An Act to dissolve and re-incorporate and to confer further powers upon the Port Talbot Company and to authorise them to construct an additional Dock and Railways and for other purposes.
- Citation: 57 & 58 Vict. c. cxli

Dates
- Royal assent: 31 July 1894

Text of statute as originally enacted

The mineral development of the area above Port Talbot demanded action of some kind, and in the 1894 session of Parliament, opposing bills were considered. One was by the Great Western Railway, and one was by the Port Talbot Company. They were for railways from Port Talbot to Maesteg, and improvements of the harbour at Port Talbot, and they were clearly mutually exclusive. The PT scheme was to extend its railway beyond Maesteg to join the GWR Blaengarw branch at Pontyrhyll, and to acquire running powers over the Blaengarw line and also the GWR main line from Port Talbot into Swansea. It was this scheme that was approved, with the Port Talbot Railway and Docks Act 1894 (57 & 58 Vict. c. cxli) gaining royal assent on 31 July 1894, but the running powers into Swansea were not included. The Port Talbot Company was restructured into the Port Talbot Railway and Docks Company. The authorised capital was £600,000, of which Emily Talbot was entitled to over 20% by virtue of shares, and money owed to her by the old company.

A contract for the work was let to S. Pearson and Son in the amount of £527,000. The firm had been selected in advance, and no competing tenders were sought; this fact led to some controversy at a Board meeting, and the resignation of a director.

== Opening ==
Construction was fairly straightforward, and the first revenue traffic was conveyed on 30 August 1897, entering the Port Talbot North Dock lines via Copper Works Junction, that is, the southern route. The line opened as far as Lletty Brongu for mineral traffic the following day, 31 August 1897. In the middle of January 1898 the mineral working was extended to the Garw at Pontyrhyll Junction.

== Whitworth and Blaenavon ==
Even as the PTR&D main line was under construction, controversy had arisen over access to pits further north, in the vicinity of Tonmawr. The South Wales Mineral Railway had been built, passing the area since 1863, but connected collieries complained that the inconvenience of the rope worked Ynysmaerdy incline on that line limited their trade. In 1885 the Rhondda and Swansea Bay Railway opened its main line up the Cwmavon valley, but passed some distance to the south of the pits. Nonetheless the R&SBR became involved in discussions about connections to the pits, but in the end declined to assist.

After considerable negotiation, the PTR&D agreed to build a line up Cwmavon from Tonygroes, paralleling much of the R&SBR line, but then turning north to run parallel to the South Wales Mineral Railway. At what became Blaenavon Junction the new line forked, continuing on one arm to Blaenavon (Glamorgan) where there were pits. The other arm continued a short distance to Tonmawr, making a junction there with the SWMR. By this time the Tonmawr Colliery branch of the SWMR (from the site of the junction running back to Tonmawr Colliery) had closed. A short distance further on along the SWMR line a new PTR&D branch to Whitworth Colliery was made, taking over the existing private railway of the Whitworth Colliery estate as part of the scheme.

Port Talbot Railway and Docks (South Wales Mineral Railway Junction) Act 1896
- Act of Parliament
- Parliament of the United Kingdom
- Long title: An Act to enable the Port Talbot Railway and Docks Company to construct new Railways in the County of Glamorgan to join the South Wales Mineral Railway and a Railway known as the Whitworth Railway and to acquire the last-mentioned Railway and for other purposes.
- Citation: 59 & 60 Vict. c. ccxii

Dates
- Royal assent: 7 August 1896

Text of statute as originally enacted

All of this, after much argumentation in Parliament, received royal assent on 7 August 1896 as the Port Talbot Railway and Docks (South Wales Mineral Railway Junction) Act 1896 (59 & 60 Vict. c. ccxii) and probably opened in June 1898, and the line opened on 14 November 1898.

== Passengers ==
The company wanted to start passenger operation and Lieutenant Colonel Yorke made the Board of Trade inspection in January 1898 and sanctioned the running of passenger trains on the main line. They started running on 14 February 1898.

A portion of line at Port Talbot between Duffryn Junction and Copper Works Junction in the new dock area was opened on 10 August 1898. This gave the PTR&D access to the docks without running over R&SBR tracks.

From 1 June 1898, the PTR&D passenger trains started running to the disused R&SBR Aberavon station. There were four return services a day, with an additional Saturday afternoon return trip, and from 5 March 1898 a Saturday evening return trip as well.

== Ogmore Valleys Extension Railway ==
In 1895, promoters associated with the Barry Railway proposed a London and South Wales Railway. This was to by-pass the Great Western Railway by building a new line from Cogan, near Cardiff, to the Metropolitan Railway north of London. The motivation in this was dissatisfaction with the Great Western Railway, which had a monopoly of rail transport from South Wales to London and Salisbury.

Swansea was not to be left out: the Vale of Glamorgan Railway, controlled by the Barry Railway, proposed a westward extension from their line, through Porthcawl to join the Rhondda and Swansea Bay Railway. Together the two schemes would provide a new line from Swansea to London. The VoGR part would bisect Emily Talbot's lands and put the PTR&D at a disadvantage.

Accordingly, a defensive scheme was proposed by her advisers. A railway (it became the Ogmore Valleys Extension Railway) was designed to traverse her lands broadly giving the alignment sought by the VoGR scheme, and running powers on it would be offered to them, enabling the PTR&D to retain control locally. The proposal extended to building as far as Tondu, and after negotiation the GWR agreed to facilitate traffic from its L&OR lines to the OVE route.

Port Talbot Railway and Docks (Ogmore Valleys Extension) Act 1896
- Act of Parliament
- Parliament of the United Kingdom
- Long title: An Act to enable the Port Talbot Railway and Docks Company to construct new Railways and works in the Ogmore Valleys in the county of Glamorgan to acquire the Morfa Railway and the Cefn and Pyle Railway and for other purposes.
- Citation: 59 & 60 Vict. c. cxlv

Dates
- Royal assent: 20 July 1896

Text of statute as originally enacted

This plan was submitted for the 1896 session of Parliament in parallel with the London and South Wales Railway scheme. The London and South Wales Railway proposal was withdrawn when the GWR gave certain undertakings, but the OVE was considered to be worthwhile in its own right, and it was authorised on 20 July 1896 as the Port Talbot Railway and Docks (Ogmore Valleys Extension) Act 1896 (59 & 60 Vict. c. cxlv). As well as the new construction the powers included acquisition of the Cefn and Pyle Railway, a horse tramroad leading from ironworks at Cefn to Pyle GWR station. This was to be converted to main line standards as a locomotive line.

The OVE line, the property of the PTR&D, was probably opened on 19 December 1898, for goods and mineral traffic only.

== Worked by the Great Western Railway ==
Notwithstanding the wording of the Company title, Railway and Docks, the dock activity was clearly more important and more demanding of directorial time, and in 1902 the Great Western Railway had enquired whether the PTR&D would wish the GWR to work the railway for them. This was not considered appropriate at the time, but towards the end of 1907 the idea found more favour.

Running powers and the working arrangements were agreed on 24 January 1908, but for financial calculation were considered to have been operative from 1 January 1907. At first the railway operation in the immediate docks area at Port Talbot was excluded, but this proved to raise practical difficulties and on 9 August 1911 it was agreed that the GWR would work all the railways activity; the agreement was backdated to 1 January 1911.

From the GWR's point of view, this was advantageous because of the rival Barry Railway's ambitions to expand to the west; the GWR's domination west of Porthcawl effectively suppressed that intention.

== Elder Dempster bunkering ==
In 1906, Elder Dempster Shipping Limited (later restructured into Elder Dempster Lines), adopted Port Talbot docks for bunkering coal worldwide, loading there and shipping the coal to remote locations for its vessels.

== 0-8-2T locomotives ==
The PTR&D main line was very steeply graded, and some of the gradient was against the load. Assistant engines were always used on heavy mineral trains, and for braking purposes had to be switched from rear to front when descending. The whole process was expensive and caused delays.

In April 1899, the Board asked locomotive manufacturers to present designs that might work the trains alone. At the time the UK locomotive building industry was overworked and the PT&RD wanted quick supply, so American manufacturers were included. The specification was to haul a trailing load of 300 tons up a gradient of 1 in 40 for 4 miles at a speed of 12 miles per hour.

Several suppliers provided quotes, and the offer from the American company of Cooke Locomotive and Machine Co through their London agents was accepted on 17 May 1899, on the basis of extremely limited information. Two locomotives were to be delivered in July 1899, with an option for three or five more for delivery in September. However the dubious contractual details (the wheel arrangement was changed and vacuum brake equipment added after acceptance of the offer) and the remarkably short building period led to grave difficulty.

The engines, Nos. 2492 and 2493, arrived early in 1900. With a 0-8-2T wheel arrangement they had flangeless wheels on the central two axles with only an inch clearance, likely due to difficulty in inserting the changed wheel arrangement into a standard frame design. They had a tractive effort of 25,490 lb. At the end of January 1900 a joint test of the engines with thirty loaded wagons and a 20-ton brake van was undertaken (the existing limit was 24 loaded wagons), It was immediately clear that performance was far below that specified.

Some faults were corrected, after which they were able to take thirty loaded wagons plus van totalling about 500 tons up a 1 in 75 gradient, but this was still far short of that specified. Notwithstanding the shortfall in performance the directors resolved to keep the engines in use and to record their performance, and negotiations over the supply contract followed.

In March 1900, the Directors were still in need of additional locomotive power and were considering whether to exercise the option for 3 or 5 more of the US engines, this time with performance specifications properly fixed. While the Board were considering the matter, in May it was reported that the locomotives had materially reduced operating cost, coal consumption being much less than with double-headed trains quite apart from the crew cost. It was decided to retender the whole process and later Sharp, Stewart and Company were given an order for two large locomotives, soon increased to three. The supplier proved much more responsive to the PTR&D requirements, and this time delivery was to be in a more realistic fourteen months. They were delivered in November 1901, and were given numbers 17 to 19; they had a boiler pressure of 180 psi and a tractive effort of 31,200 lb. These locomotives were much more reliable.

By February 1906, it had become clear that the boilers and fireboxes were defective in the American engines, and in 1908 they went to Swindon to be fitted with Standard No. 4 boilers with modified Belpaire fireboxes and a raised pressure of 200 psi. These modifications improved their reliability.

== Death of Emily Talbot ==
Emily Charlotte Talbot died on 21 September 1918; her fortune passed to her nephew Andrew Fletcher and her niece Eveline Fletcher.

== Steam Railmotor ==
In the first decade of the twentieth century, steam railmotors came into use on certain railways. They were passenger vehicles with a small steam engine integrated into it used to cheaply serve passengers in lightly used areas, although they required a crew of three like a conventional train. They were widespread on the GWR, and the PTR&D were persuaded to try the system. On 26 July 1905, the directors agreed to invite tenders for a "steam motor car".

Fifteen tenders were received, and a joint tender from Hurst, Nelson & Co. Ltd and R. & W. Hawthorn, Leslie and Company was accepted and delivered in early 1907. This was the largest steam railmotor ever built in the UK at 76 ft 10 in (23.42 m) long, with metal bodywork was metal covering the engine fashioned to match the carriage. Retractable steps were fitted under each of the four recessed passenger doors, although the steps were later fixed in position.

The locomotive was six-coupled with 3 ft 0 in (910 mm) diameter wheels; it had a conventional boiler with the firebox leading, 12 in × 16 in (300 mm × 410 mm) cylinders and working pressure of 170 psi (1,200 kPa) giving 9,792 lbf (43.56 kN) of tractive effort.

The long wheelbase meant that the facing point locking bars on the line had to be lengthened. (Note: At facing points a locking bar was placed alongside one of the running rails; if the signalman wished to move the points, the locking bar had first to be raised. If a vehicle was passing or standing at the point, the wheel flanges prevented this process, so that the points could not be moved under a train. The locking bar obviously had to be at least as long as the longest spacing of the wheels on any passing vehicle.) Rail motor No. 1 entered service in April or May 1907, and gradually took up the majority of the passenger traffic, and by July 1907 was working the ordinary passenger trains four days per week, at a daily saving of £3 6s 6d. At some point a trailing load was contemplated.

The rail motor was moved to Swindon Works in 1915, and never returned to South Wales; the train service was operated by conventional trains from this time. It ended its working life on the Millwall Extension Railway in 1926.

== Workmen's trains on the OVE ==
In 1915, the Baldwin company asked the GWR to operate workmen's trains from Margam steelworks to the Newlands and Cribbwr Fawr collieries. This was not agreed to at the time, but from 6 May 1918 such a service started operation. It was discontinued by July 1928.

== Grouping ==
Following World War I, the railways were seriously run down, and the Government decided to restructure most of the railways of Great Britain. Four new larger companies would be created, the so-called "groups". The legislation was the Railways Act 1921. The western group was to be called the Great Western Railway, and the old GWR was naturally the largest component of it. The Port Talbot Railway and Docks was to be a subsidiary.

Negotiations proceeded on the terms, in fact before the structure of the legislation had been determined. The PTR&D was financially successful, and demanded a good price for its company; the agreed terms included £81 of 5% GWR Guaranteed Stock for every £10 PTR&D ordinary stock. Delayed by the need to wait for the Act, the terms were finalised for absorption in January 1923, but the transfer was considered to have been effected on 1 January 1922. By this process, the GWR acquired the docks at Port Talbot.

Statistics for the final full year of PT&RD independence included the capital issued at £1.69 million and income for 1921 at £121,737; the final year dividend had been 9%. There were 22 route miles of network, and 22 locomotives were absorbed into the Western Group (the new GWR). There were 738 staff, reflecting the dominance of the dockside activity.

== Duffryn Mills Halt ==
Duffryn Mills Halt was opened a short distance up the line from Duffryn Junction on 14 February 1931. It was provided to serve Goitre cemetery and stops, in the down direction only, were made on request.

== Port Talbot Steelworks ==
As early as 1902, the Port Talbot Steelworks entered production, and its location alongside both the PTR&D and the Great Western Railway encouraged a symbiotic relationship. The steelworks grew in importance and size, becoming Margam Steelworks in the 1920s. The Abbey Steelworks followed in 1952, becoming the largest steelworks in Europe.

In 1960, connections were installed between the OVE lines and the former GWR main line where they intersected at Newlands, south-east of Port Talbot, and Margam Marshalling Yard was built between there and Port Talbot itself. This became the main staging point for general freight in West Wales.

== Closures ==
The reduced use of the passenger service in the face of economic decline resulted in withdrawal beyond Maesteg on 12 September 1932, and between Port Talbot and Maesteg from 11 September 1933.

The reduced use applied to the mineral traffic as well and the line between Lletty Brongu and Celtic Colliery was closed to revenue traffic from March 1939; traffic from Celtic Colliery was worked out via Pontyrhyll until it closed in 1942.

A further steep drop in mineral activity resulted in all of the remaining network except for short stubs at Port Talbot and the dock lines being closed between 1964 and 1967. The Great Western Railway had been taken into nationalised ownership at the beginning of 1948.

Margam Hump Marshalling Yard closed on 31 October 1987.

== Topography ==
=== Gradients ===
From Pontyrhyll, the line climbed for 11 miles to Cwmcerwen Tunnel; at first undulating with typical gradients of 1 in 75 to Lletty Brongu, the line then climbed steadily at 1 in 90, 1 in 100 and 1 in 75 to the tunnel. After that it descended at 1 in 40 nearly all the way to Duffryn Junction, and still descended from there to Port Talbot.

=== Locations ===
- Pontyrhyll; opened 25 October 1886; closed 9 February 1953;
- Bettws Llangeinor; opened by February 1900; closed 12 September 1932;
- Lletty Brongu; opened 14 February 1898; closed 12 September 1932;
- Garth; opened by March 1899; closed 9 June 1913;
- Cwmdu; opened 9 June 1913; closed 12 September 1932;
- Maesteg; opened 14 February 1898; renamed Maesteg Neath Road 1924; closed 11 September 1933;
- Cwmcerwen Tunnel;
- Bryn; opened 14 February 1898; closed 11 September 1933;
- Duffryn Mills Halt; opened 14 February 1931: closed 1936:
- Duffryn Junction;
- Ton-y-Groes Junction;
- Port Talbot Central; opened 14 February 1898; closed 11 September 1933;

=== Blaenavon line ===
- Blaenavon Colliery;
- Margam Forge;
- Duffryn Junction;

=== OVE line ===
- Cefn Junction; diverged from L&OR line to Porthcawl;
- Waterhall Junction; Pyle branch diverged;
- Margam Junction; converged with and then diverged from GWR main line;
- Copper Works Junction;
- Port Talbot Docks.

=== Pyle branch ===
- Waterhall Junction; above;
- Pyle; convergence with GWR main line.

== PTR locomotives ==
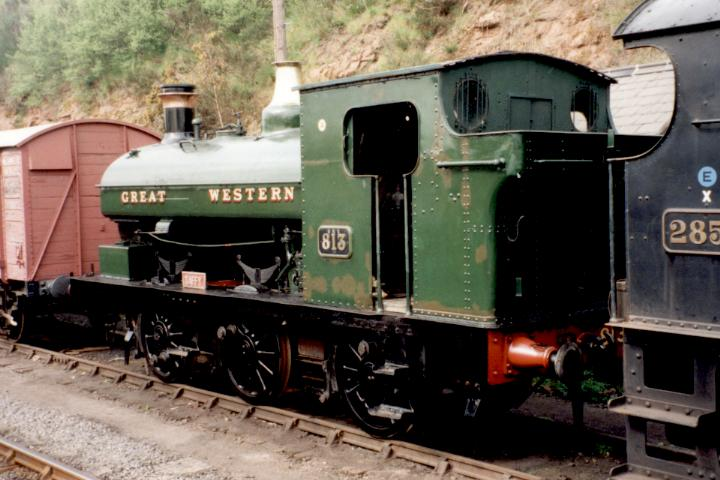
PTR Hudswell Clarke 0-6-0ST No. 26 on the Severn Valley Railway in 2004

- Port Talbot Railway 0-6-2T (Stephenson)
- Port Talbot Railway 0-8-2T (Cooke)
- Port Talbot Railway 0-8-2T (Sharp Stewart)
- Port Talbot Railway 0-6-0ST (Hudswell Clarke)

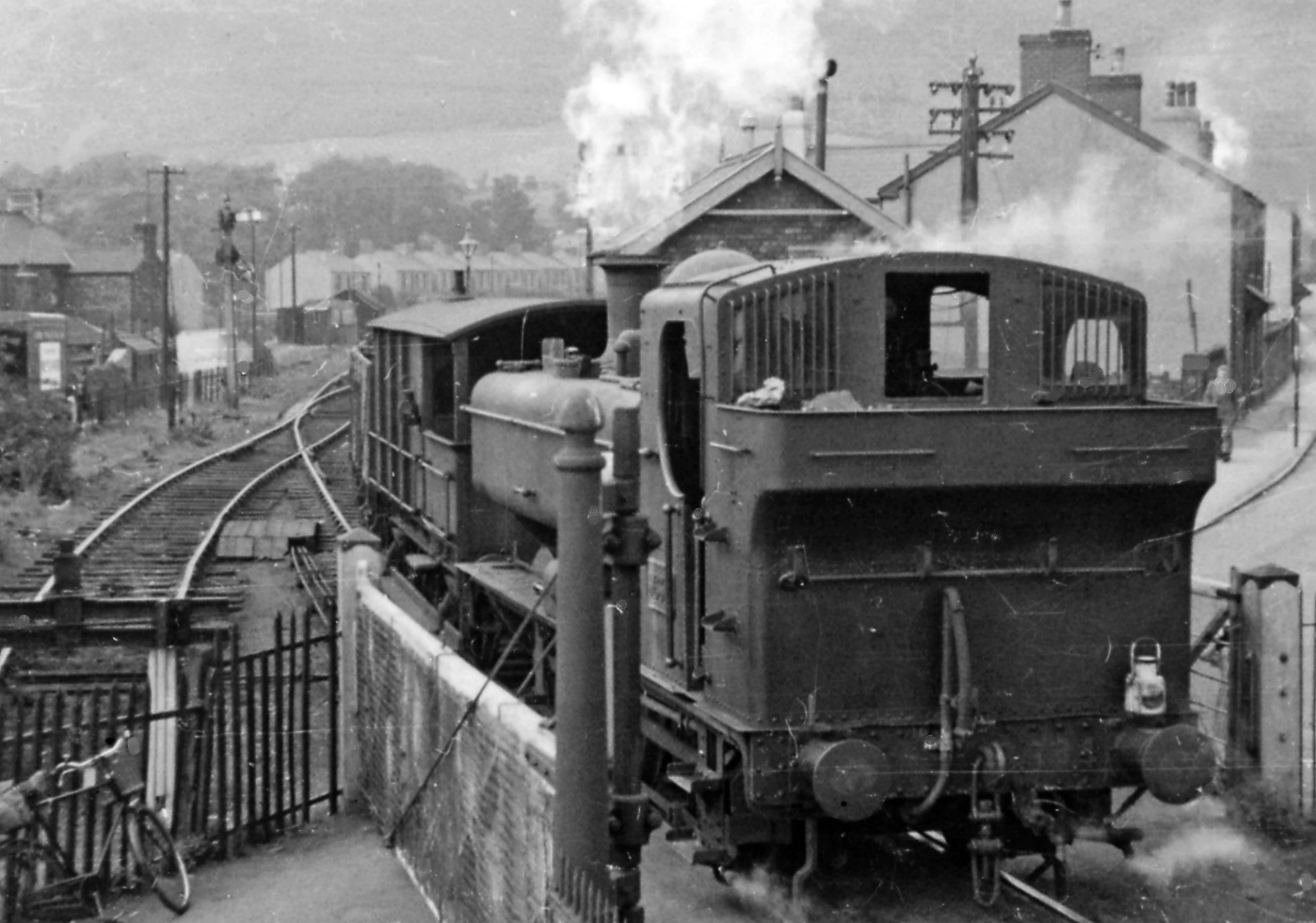
Pannier tank banking an empties train at Duffryn Junction in 1949

When it was absorbed by the GWR on 1 January 1922, the PTR operated a total of twenty-two engines of seven different classes, built by four distinct locomotive manufacturers. The last of the ex-PTR locos was withdrawn from service by the GWR in 1948.

GWR 813 (Port Talbot Railway 26) is (2017) operational on the Severn Valley Railway. and is owned by the GWR 813 Preservation Fund
