= Steam spring =

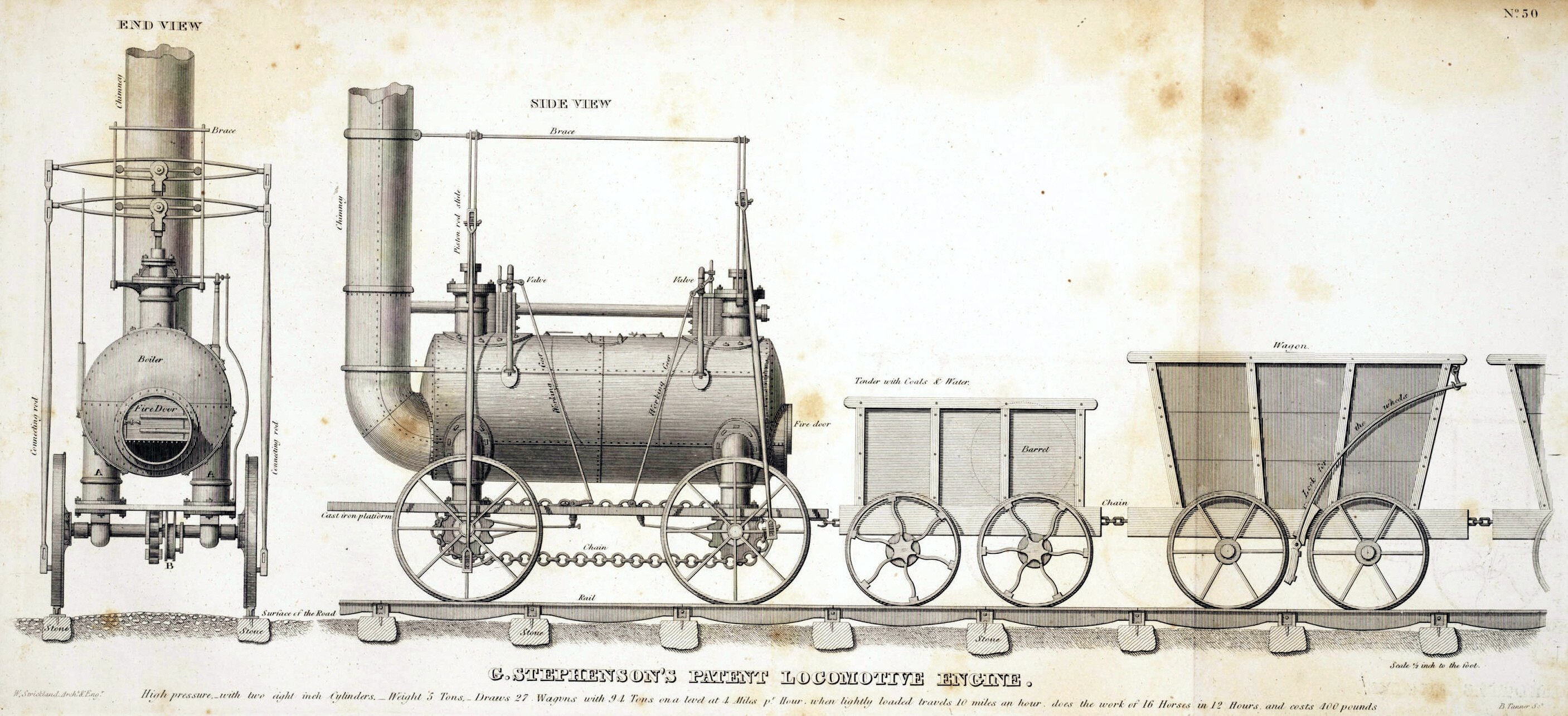
Stephenson four-wheeled locomotive of around 1814

Steam springs or steam suspension are a form of suspension used for some early steam locomotives designed and built by George Stephenson. They were only briefly used and may have been used for fewer than ten locomotives.

== Requirements for suspension ==
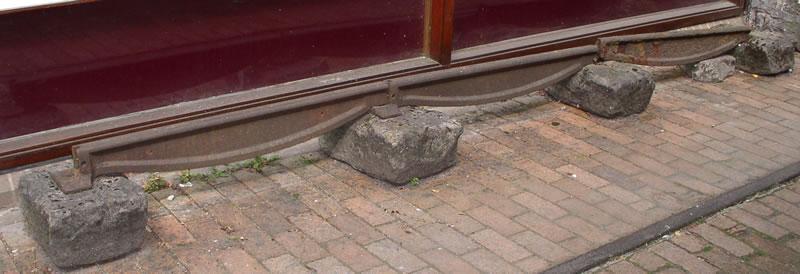
Cast-iron fishbelly rail

Early railways used cast-iron fishbelly rails. These were brittle and prone to cracking under shock loads. The new steam locomotives of the 1820s were much heavier than the horse-drawn wagons of earlier plateways. Locomotives of this period also used vertical cylinders set within the boiler. The vertical forces of the moving pistons further gave rise to hammer blow, which increased the load on the rails.

A further reason for suspension was to improve the frictional contact between the wheels and rail. This relied upon maintaining a good contact, thus requiring good suspension of the wheels over the uneven track. The ability of an 'adhesion-hauled' locomotive to draw a train was much questioned at this time, as it was thought that the friction between a smooth iron wheel and the rail would be inadequate. Some designers, such as Blenkinsop with his Salamanca thought that a system of geared teeth would be necessary. Stephenson believed that, provided a good contact could be maintained between wheel and rail, frictional adhesion alone would be adequate.

== Steam springs ==
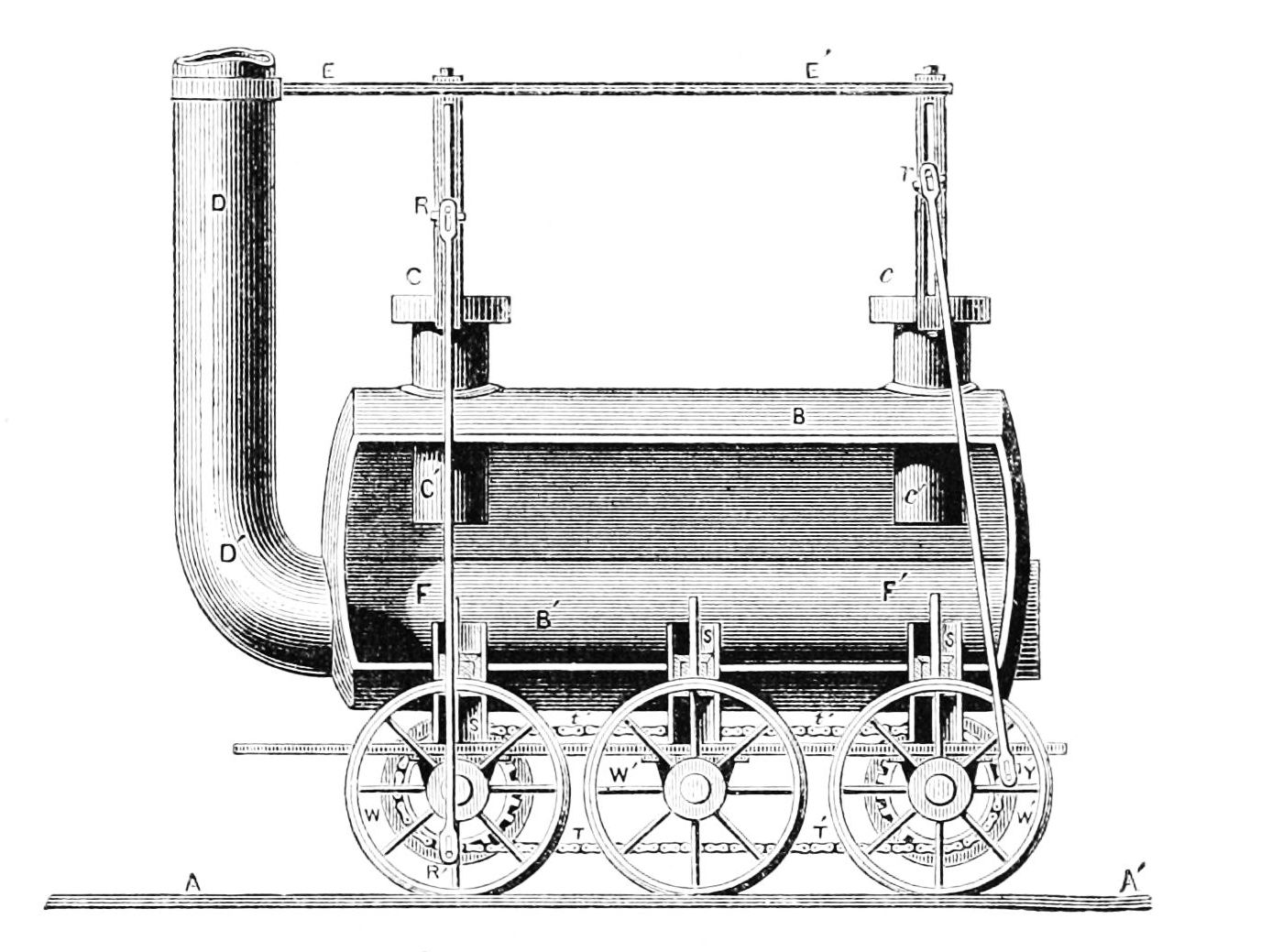
1877 drawing of a claimed '1815 Stephenson locomotive', similar to The Duke but with flanged wheels, a plate chain and lacking the centre sprocket wheel.

At the time of these early locomotives there was not yet a way of forging an adequate steel spring to carry the weight of a locomotive. High quality steel had been available since Huntsman's crucible process, but it was still so expensive as to be regarded as 'a semi-precious metal'. It would be another forty years before Bessemer's converter made cheap bulk steel available. A similar problem affected safety valves, causing them to rely on dead weights or Hackworth's bulky stack of leaf springs, rather than the ubiquitous steel coil spring that would appear later.

Stephenson's 'steam suspension' provided each wheel with its own 'steam spring'. Vertical cylinders were set into the base of the boiler, above each axle and offset in pairs to the sides. The chassis or frames of Stephenson's locomotives provided little structural strength, most of which came from the shell of the boiler. Inside each cylinder a piston carried the load of the axle and pressed upwards against steam pressure within the boiler. A piston of only a few inches in diameter was sufficient to balance the locomotive's weight. The axlebox bearings could slide vertically within hornblocks attached to the wooden frame beneath the boiler.

Piston seals were a perennial problem at this time. Those for large stationary engines, working at low pressures, were sealed by a variety of methods including leather cup washers, pools of standing water and even a poultice of cow dung. As working pressures increased, which had been an essential part of turning the stationary steam engine into the mobile steam locomotive, demands on the piston seal increased further. Pistons were now mostly sealed by having oakum rope wrapped around them in a groove, often smeared with tallow. Keeping the rope seal moist, thus swollen, was recognised as an important factor in achieving a good seal. As the steam spring cylinders were in the lower part of the boiler, below the water line, it was expected that they would seal well. Despite this, they continued to give trouble with leakage and were eventually removed and replaced with iron or steel leaf springs. Wood in 1831 illustrates one of the Killingworth locomotives, now fitted with metal leaf springs and also coupling rods.

=== Killingworth Colliery locomotives ===
George Stephenson's first locomotive was the Blücher of 1814. (Note: Recent scholarship holds that Stephenson's My Lord of 1814 pre-dated Blücher) This was a four-wheeled locomotive with the wheels coupled by spur gears. It suffered from poor traction on the relatively new technology of edge rails with flanged wheels, put down to the problem of maintaining a good contact with them. It was the first of a batch of early Stephenson locomotives known as the 'Killingworth Colliery locomotives'. (Note: It is uncertain just when the various Killingworth locomotives were built and details of their various designs are mis-reported.) Stephenson's next design was a development of this, still with four wheels, but now using a chain drive to couple them together. This was his first locomotive to use steam springs.

=== The Duke ===
Stephenson had gained a reputation as a builder of locomotives and was approached to build the first locomotive for use in Scotland, on the Kilmarnock and Troon Railway. The Duke was larger, with six wheels, and used the same chain drive and steam springs as the Killingworth locomotives. As this locomotive was to be built for an outside customer, Stephenson could no longer use the workshop facilities at Killingworth and so it was built at his friend William Losh's Walker Iron Works in Newcastle. Improvements of this locomotive were detailed in a patent, jointly filed with Losh, on 30 September 1816.

The Duke was probably completed in 1817 and ran at Kilmarnock, but seems to have continued the problems of rail breakage. It was sold to the Earl of Elgin in October 1824 for his railway in Fife, but being too heavy for the rails was used as a stationary pumping engine in a quarry at Charlestown, and from 1830 at a colliery near Dunfermline; its subsequent fate is unrecorded.

Most Scottish depictions of The Duke are inaccurate, being based on the Killingworth locomotives or even Stephenson's Rocket, but in 1914 a commemorative silver model was made for the centenary and this alone seems accurate, showing the six wheels and the cylinders of the steam springs.

=== Hetton Colliery locomotives ===
Five locomotives were built for Hetton Colliery between 1820 and 1822, four of which were named: Hettton, Dart, Tallyho and Star. These were of similar design to The Duke, but four-wheeled with 3 ft 9 in (1,140 mm) wheels. They were built with steam springs, later removed owing to problems with steam leakage.

In 1852, Lyon was built as a replica of these early Hetton locomotives.

=== Later locomotives and Locomotion ===
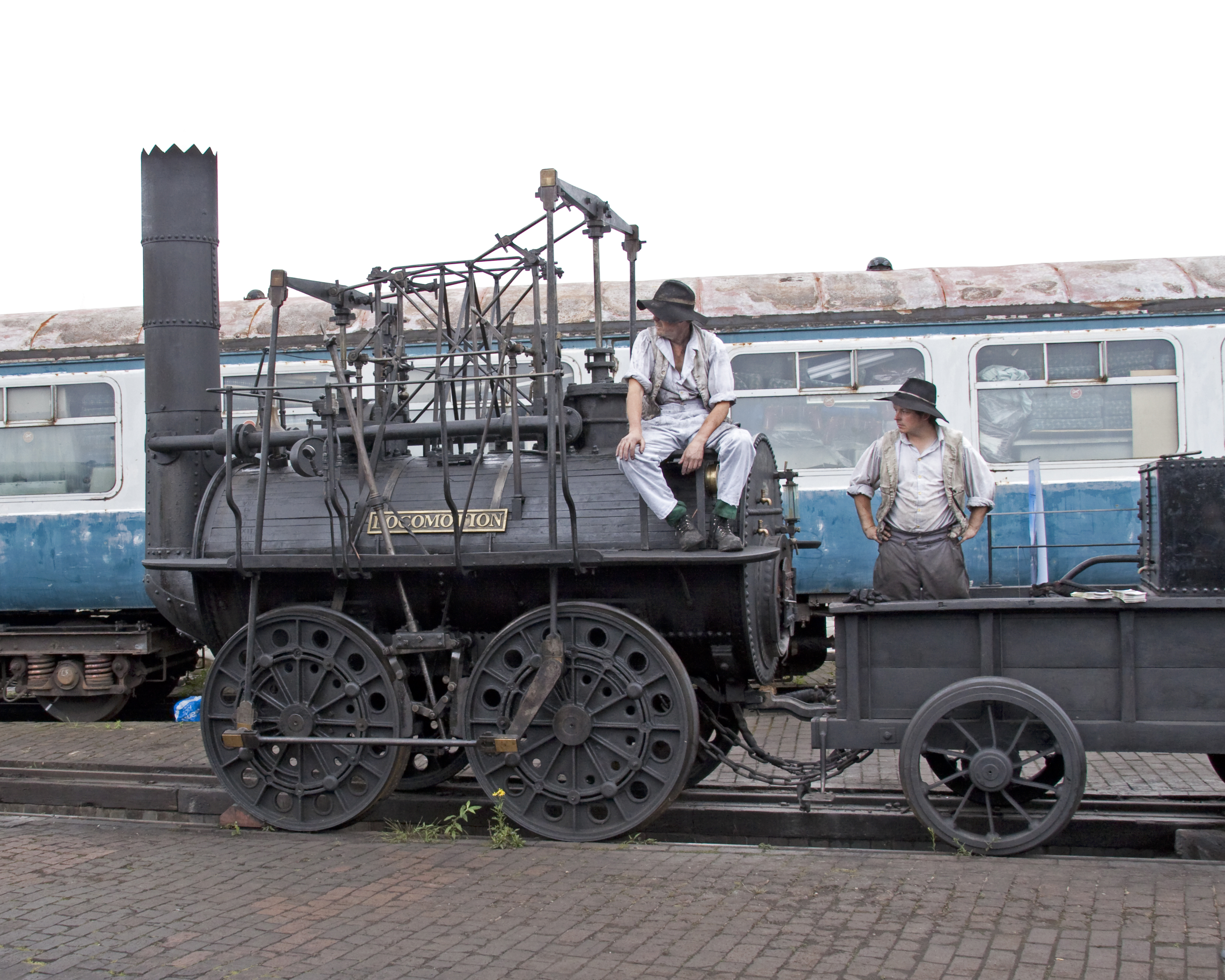
Locomotion (replica), with coupling rods and Hackworth two-part disc wheels

Later locomotives abandoned the steam springs. For Locomotion on the Stockton and Darlington Railway in 1825 there was no springing provided. Although there were no springs, side-to-side compensation was provided to keep good contact between rails and wheels. One of the axles was carried in a 'cannon box' bearing that was pivoted centrally and could tilt from side to side. Although not giving a stable ride for the locomotive, it did allow the wheels to follow uneven track. The presence of this cannon box between the wheels also prevented the previous use of the central drive chain and so Stephenson adopted the now ubiquitous coupling rods for his first time. Reducing the travel of the suspension, compared to that with steam springs, also made the provision of free-running coupling rods easier, as it avoided the change in effective wheelbase when one axle moved relative to the other.

The unsprung ride broke the original eight-spoked cast-iron wheels and so these were replaced by Hackworth with his distinctive two piece cast-iron disc wheels, trued by wooden wedges between the concentric parts. Rail breakage had been reduced by this time with the use of stronger rails. These new malleable wrought iron rails had been the source of a rift between Stephenson and Losh, as Losh had originally expected to supply cast-iron rails from his ironworks, which Stephenson had briefly been a partner in. Stephenson though chose to use an improved iron rail from John Birkinshaw's Bedlington Ironworks instead.
