= George Stephenson =

English mechanical and civil engineer (1781–1848)

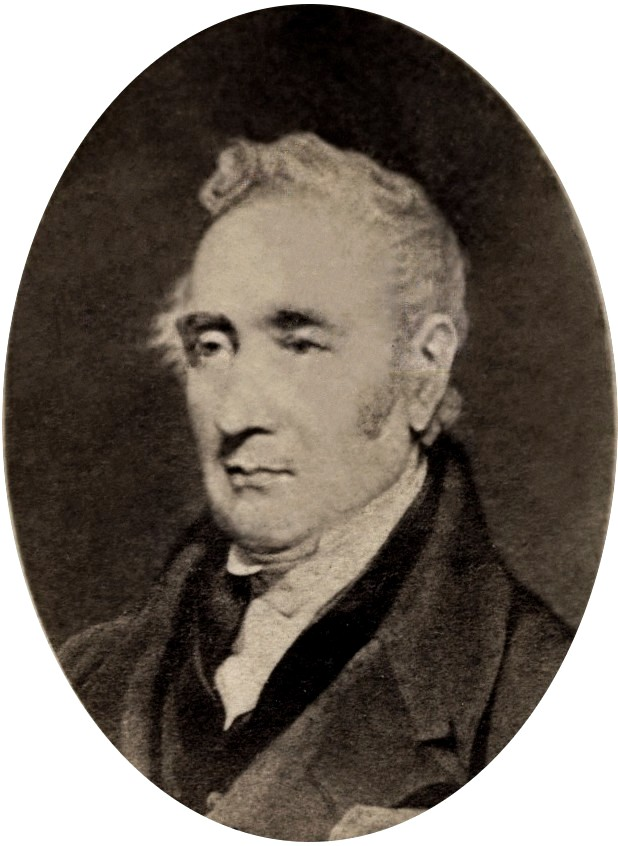
- Born: 9 June 1781; Wylam, Northumberland, England
- Died: 12 August 1848 (aged 67); Chesterfield, Derbyshire, England
- Resting place: Holy Trinity Church, Chesterfield
- Occupations: Civil engineer; mechanical engineer
- Spouse(s): Frances Henderson (1802–1806); Elizabeth Hindmarsh (1820–1845); Ellen Gregory (1848)
- Children: Robert Stephenson; Frances Stephenson (died in infancy)

George Stephenson (9 June 1781 – 12 August 1848) was an English civil engineer and mechanical engineer. Renowned as the "Father of Railways", Stephenson was considered by the Victorians as a great example of diligent application and thirst for improvement. His chosen rail gauge, sometimes called "Stephenson gauge", (Note: 'Stephenson gauge' was initially of 4 feet 8 inches (1,420 mm) in the North East of England. For the higher speeds of the Liverpool and Manchester Railway, this was expanded slightly to 4 feet 8 1/2 inches (1,435 mm) between the rails whilst keeping the same spacing between the wheels, making it more free-running. It is unclear how much of this was George Stephenson's initiative and how much was his son Robert's.) was the basis for the 4-foot-8 1/2-inch (1.435 m) standard gauge used by most of the world's railways.

Pioneered by Stephenson, rail transport was one of the most important technological inventions of the 19th century and a key component of the Industrial Revolution. Built by George and his son Robert's company Robert Stephenson and Company, the Locomotion No. 1 was the first steam locomotive to carry passengers on a public rail line, the Stockton and Darlington Railway in 1825. George also built the first public inter-city railway line in the world to use locomotives, the Liverpool and Manchester Railway, which opened in 1830. Following this, according to Encyclopedia Britannica, "Stephenson continued as the chief guide of the revolutionary transportation medium, solving problems of roadway construction, bridge design, and locomotive and rolling-stock manufacture. He built many other railways in the Midlands, and he acted as consultant on many railroad projects at home and abroad."

== Childhood ==
George Stephenson was born on 9 June 1781 in Wylam, Northumberland, which is 9 miles (15 km) west of Newcastle upon Tyne. He was the second child of Robert and Mabel Stephenson, neither of whom could read or write. Robert was the fireman for Wylam Colliery pumping engine, earning a very low wage, so there was no money for schooling. At 17, Stephenson became an engineman at Water Row Pit in Newburn nearby. George realised the value of education and paid to study at night school to learn reading, writing and arithmetic. He was illiterate until the age of 18.

In 1801 he began work at Black Callerton Colliery south of Ponteland as a 'brakesman', controlling the winding gear at the pit. In 1802 he married Frances Henderson and moved to Willington Quay, east of Newcastle. There he worked as a brakesman while they lived in one room of a cottage. George made shoes and mended clocks to supplement his income.

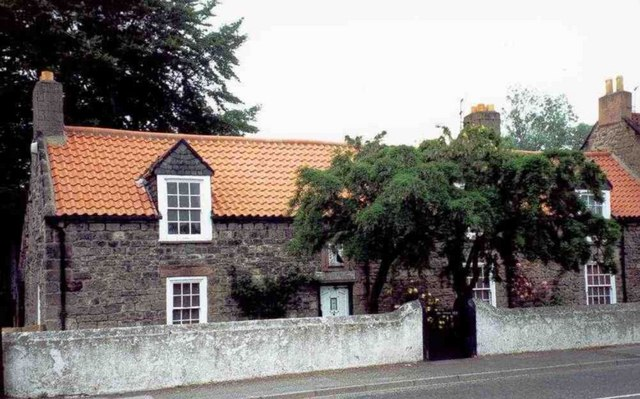
Dial Cottage, in West Moor, Killingworth. The sun-dial made and installed by George Stephenson can be seen above the front door.

Their first child Robert was born in 1803, and in 1804 they moved to Dial Cottage at West Moor, near Killingworth where George worked as a brakesman at Killingworth Pit. Their second child, a daughter, was born in July 1805. She was named Frances after her mother, but died after just three weeks and was buried in St Bartholomew's Church, Long Benton north of Newcastle.

In 1806 George's wife Frances died of consumption, which would nowadays be termed as tuberculosis. She was buried in the same churchyard as their daughter on 16 May 1806, though the location of the grave is lost.

George decided to find work in Scotland and left Robert with a local woman while he went to work in Montrose in Scotland. After a few months he returned, probably because his father had been blinded in a mining accident. He moved back into a cottage at West Moor and his unmarried sister Eleanor moved in to look after Robert. In 1811 the pumping engine at High Pit, Killingworth was not working properly and Stephenson offered to improve it. He did so with such success that he was promoted to enginewright for the collieries at Killingworth, responsible for maintaining and repairing all the colliery engines. He became an expert in steam-driven machinery.

== Early projects ==
=== The Safety Lamp ===
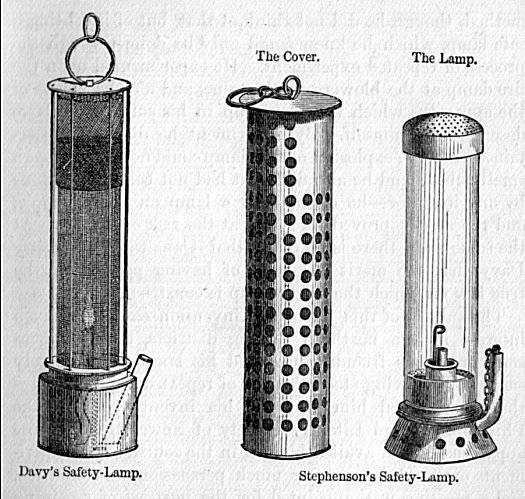
Stephenson's safety lamp at right, shown with Davy's lamp on the left

In 1815, aware of the explosions often caused in mines by naked flames, Stephenson began to experiment with a safety lamp that would burn in a gaseous atmosphere without causing an explosion. At the same time, the eminent scientist and Cornishman Humphry Davy was also looking at the problem. Despite his lack of scientific knowledge, Stephenson, by trial and error, devised a lamp in which the air entered via tiny holes, through which the flames of the lamp could not pass.

A month before Davy presented his design to the Royal Society, Stephenson demonstrated his own lamp to two witnesses by taking it down Killingworth Colliery and holding it in front of a fissure from which firedamp was issuing. The two designs differed; Davy's lamp was surrounded by a screen of gauze, whereas Stephenson's prototype lamp had a perforated plate containing a glass cylinder. For his invention Davy was awarded £2000, whilst Stephenson was accused of stealing the idea from Davy, because he was not seen as an adequate scientist who could have produced the lamp by any approved scientific method.

Stephenson, having come from the North-East, spoke with a broad Northumberland accent and not the 'Language of Parliament,' which made him seem lowly. Realizing this, he made a point of educating his son Robert in a private school, where he was taught to speak in Standard English with a Received Pronunciation accent. It was due to this, in their future dealings with Parliament, that it became clear that the authorities preferred Robert to his father.

A local committee of enquiry gathered in support of Stephenson, exonerated him, proved he had been working separately to create the 'Geordie Lamp', and awarded him £1,000, but Davy and his supporters refused to accept their findings, and would not see how an uneducated man such as Stephenson could come up with the solution he had. In 1833 a House of Commons committee found that Stephenson had equal claim to having invented the safety lamp. Davy went to his grave believing that Stephenson had stolen his idea. The Stephenson lamp was used almost exclusively in North East England, whereas the Davy lamp was used everywhere else. The experience gave Stephenson a lifelong distrust of London-based, theoretical, scientific experts.

In his book George and Robert Stephenson, the author L.T.C. Rolt relates that opinion varied about the two lamps' efficiency: that the Davy Lamp gave more light, but the Geordie Lamp was thought to be safer in a more gaseous atmosphere. He made reference to an incident at Oaks Colliery in Barnsley where both lamps were in use. Following a sudden strong influx of gas the tops of all the Davy Lamps became red hot (which had in the past caused an explosion, and in so doing risked another), whilst all the Geordie Lamps simply went out.

There is a theory that it was Stephenson who indirectly gave the name of "Geordies" to the people of the North East of England. By this theory, the name of the Geordie Lamp attached to the North East pit men themselves. By 1866 any native of Newcastle upon Tyne could be called a Geordie.

=== Locomotives ===
Cornishman Richard Trevithick is credited with steam engine research and development, leading to what has been variously described as "the first steam-powered passenger vehicle", or "his first high-pressure steam locomotive", in both cases referring to his unveiling and testing of the "Puffing Devil" (or simply, "Puffer") on 24 December 1801. This was a result of his refinements of the steam engine of James Watt toward "strong [high pressure] steam", Watt believing this direction of development too dangerous. Evident from both accounts is that this first strong steam "locomotive" operated without tracks, because it was three years later that Trevithick was successful in producing a steam engine that operated on rails. Later, he visited Tyneside and built an engine there for a mine-owner. Several local men were inspired by this, and designed their own engines.

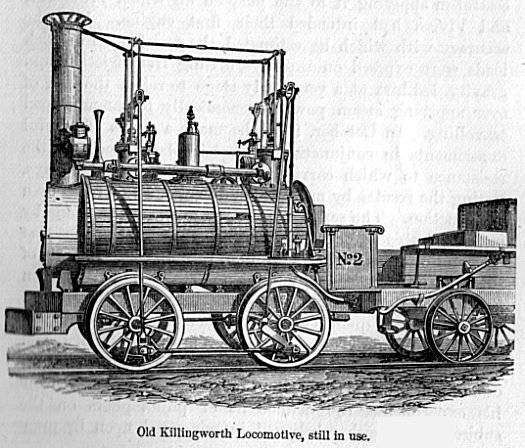
Early Stephenson locomotive in Samuel Smiles' Lives of the Engineers (1862). Called an 1816 Killingworth Colliery locomotive (often claimed to be Blücher), it looks more like the slightly later Hetton colliery railway locomotives whose 1852 replica Lyons was still operating in Smiles' time.

Stephenson designed his first locomotive in 1814, a travelling engine designed for hauling coal on the Killingworth wagonway named Blücher after the Prussian general Gebhard Leberecht von Blücher (It was suggested the name sprang from Blücher's rapid march of his army in support of Wellington at Waterloo). (Note: Recent scholarship holds that Stephenson's My Lord of 1814 pre-dated Blücher) Blücher was modelled on Matthew Murray's locomotive Willington, which George studied at Kenton and Coxlodge colliery on Tyneside, and was constructed in the colliery workshop behind Stephenson's home, Dial Cottage, on Great Lime Road. The locomotive could haul 30 tons of coal up a hill at 4 mph (6.4 km/h), and was the first successful flanged-wheel adhesion locomotive: its traction depended on contact between its flanged wheels and the rail.

Altogether, Stephenson is said to have produced 16 locomotives at Killingworth, although it has not proved possible to produce a convincing list of all 16. Of those identified, most were built for use at Killingworth or for the Hetton colliery railway. A six-wheeled locomotive was built for the Kilmarnock and Troon Railway in 1817 but was withdrawn from service because of damage to the cast-iron rails. Another locomotive was supplied to Scott's Pit railroad at Llansamlet, near Swansea, in 1819 but it too was withdrawn, apparently because it was under-boilered and again caused damage to the track.

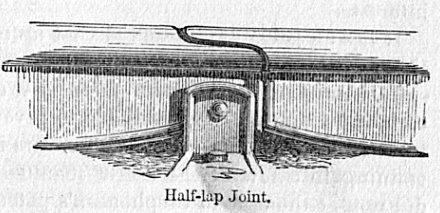
Fishbelly rail with half-lap joint, patented by Stephenson 1816

The new engines were too heavy to run on wooden rails or plate-way, and iron edge rails were in their infancy, with cast iron exhibiting excessive brittleness. Together with William Losh, Stephenson improved the design of cast-iron edge rails to reduce breakage; rails were briefly made by Losh, Wilson and Bell at their Walker ironworks.

According to Rolt, Stephenson managed to solve the problem caused by the weight of the engine on the primitive rails. He experimented with a steam spring (to 'cushion' the weight using steam pressure acting on pistons to support the locomotive frame), but soon followed the practice of 'distributing' weight by using a number of wheels or bogies. For the Stockton and Darlington Railway Stephenson used wrought-iron malleable rails that he had found satisfactory, notwithstanding the financial loss he suffered by not using his own patented design.

=== Hetton Railway ===
Stephenson was hired to build the eight-mile (13-km) Hetton colliery railway in 1820. He used a combination of gravity on downward inclines and locomotives for level and upward stretches. This, the first railway using no animal power, opened in 1822. This line used a gauge of 4 ft 8 in (1,422 mm) which Stephenson had used before at the Killingworth wagonway. Other locomotives includeThe Duke for the Kilmarnock and Troon Railway (1817–1824).

== The first railways ==
=== Stockton and Darlington Railway ===
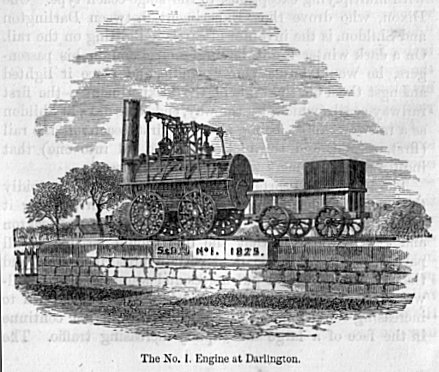
The No. 1 engine, called Locomotion, for the Stockton & Darlington Railway

In 1821, a parliamentary bill was passed to allow the building of the Stockton and Darlington Railway (S&DR). The 25-mile (40 km) railway connected collieries near Bishop Auckland to the River Tees at Stockton, passing through Darlington on the way. The original plan was to use horses to draw coal carts on metal rails, but after company director Edward Pease met Stephenson, he agreed to change the plans. Stephenson surveyed the line in 1821, and assisted by his 18-year-old son Robert, construction began the same year.

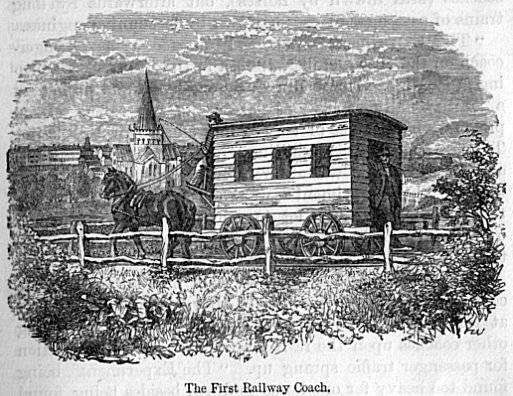
Experiment, the first railway carriage

A manufacturer was needed to provide the locomotives for the line. Pease and Stephenson had jointly established a company in Newcastle to manufacture locomotives. It was set up as Robert Stephenson and Company, and George's son Robert was the managing director. A fourth partner was Michael Longridge of Bedlington Ironworks. On an early trade card, Robert Stephenson & Co was described as "Engineers, Millwrights & Machinists, Brass & Iron Founders". In September 1825, the works at Forth Street, Newcastle, completed the first locomotive for the railway: originally named Active, it was renamed Locomotion and was followed by Hope, Diligence and Black Diamond. The Stockton and Darlington Railway opened on 27 September 1825. Driven by Stephenson, Locomotion hauled an 80-ton load of coal and flour nine miles (14 km) in two hours, reaching a speed of 15 miles per hour (24 kilometres per hour) on one stretch. The first purpose-built passenger car, Experiment, was attached and carried dignitaries on the opening journey. It was the first time passenger traffic had been run on a steam locomotive railway.

The rails used for the line were wrought-iron, produced by John Birkinshaw at the Bedlington Ironworks. Wrought-iron rails could be produced in longer lengths than cast-iron and were less liable to crack under the weight of heavy locomotives. William Losh of Walker Ironworks thought he had an agreement with Stephenson to supply cast-iron rails, and Stephenson's decision caused a permanent rift between them. The gauge Stephenson chose for the line was 4 feet 8 1/2 inches (1,435 mm) which subsequently was adopted as the standard gauge for railways, not only in Britain, but throughout the world.

=== Liverpool and Manchester Railway ===
Statue of George Stephenson at the National Railway Museum, York

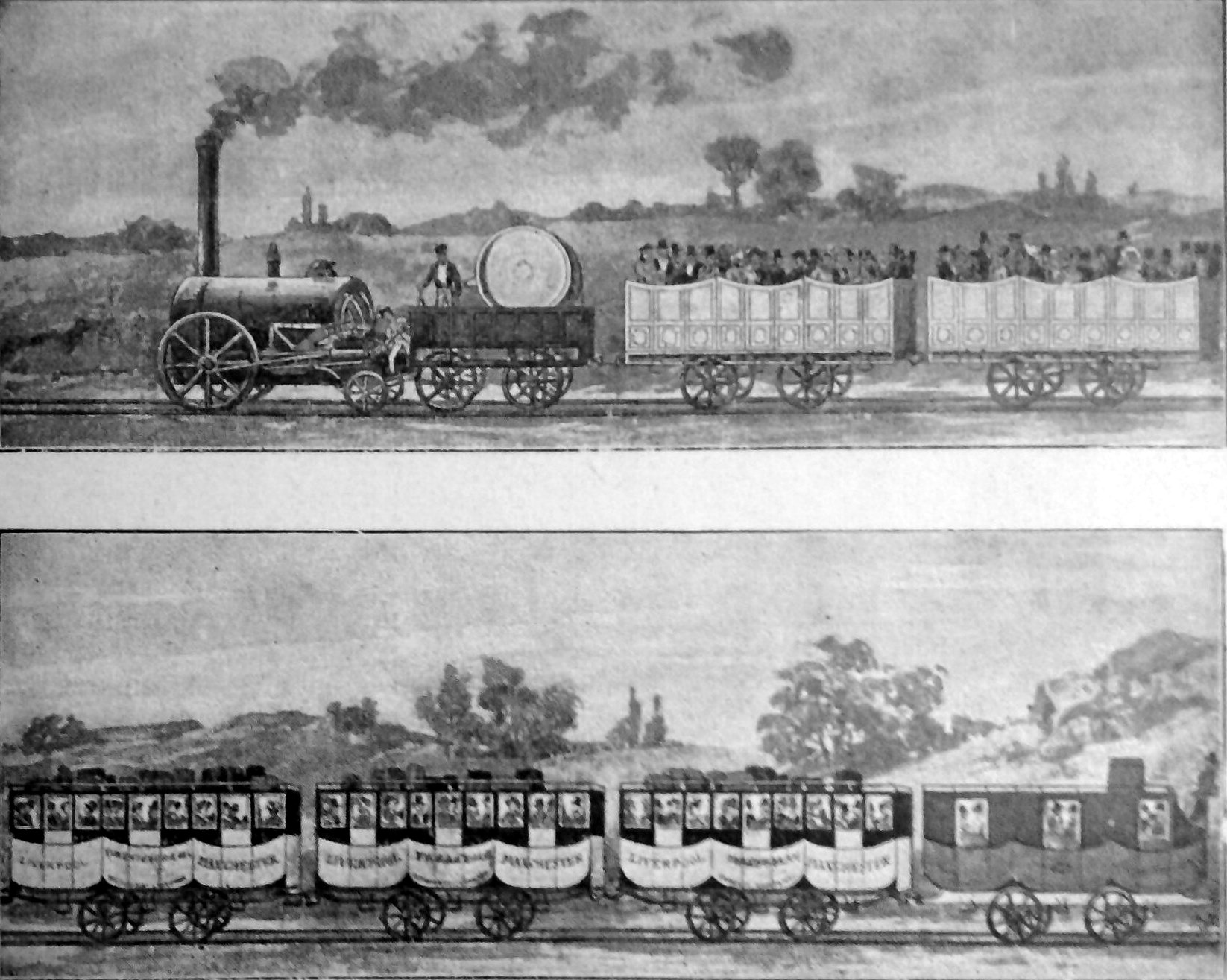
First passenger railway, L&MR

Stephenson had ascertained by experiments at Killingworth that half the power of the locomotive was consumed by a gradient as little as 1 in 260. He concluded that railways should be kept as level as possible. He used this knowledge while working on the Bolton and Leigh Railway, and the Liverpool and Manchester Railway (L&MR), executing a series of difficult cuttings, embankments and stone viaducts to level their routes. Defective surveying of the original route of the L&MR caused by hostility from some affected landowners meant Stephenson encountered difficulty during Parliamentary scrutiny of the original bill, especially under cross-examination by Edward Hall Alderson. The bill was rejected and a revised bill for a new alignment was submitted and passed in a subsequent session. The revised alignment presented the problem of crossing Chat Moss, an apparently bottomless peat bog, which Stephenson overcame by unusual means, effectively floating the line across it. The method he used was similar to that used by John Metcalf who constructed many miles of road across marshes in the Pennines, laying a foundation of heather and branches, which became bound together by the weight of the passing coaches, with a layer of stones on top.

As the L&MR approached completion in 1829, its directors arranged a competition to decide who would build its locomotives, and the Rainhill Trials were run in October 1829. Entries could weigh no more than six tons and had to travel along the track for a total distance of 60 miles (97 km). Stephenson's entry was Rocket, and its performance in winning the contest made it famous. George's son Robert had been working in South America from 1824 to 1827 and returned to run the Forth Street Works while George was in Liverpool overseeing the construction of the line. Robert was responsible for the detailed design of Rocket, although he was in constant postal communication with his father, who made many suggestions. One significant innovation, suggested by Henry Booth, treasurer of the L&MR, was the use of a fire-tube boiler, invented by French engineer Marc Seguin, that gave improved heat exchange.

The opening ceremony of the L&MR, on 15 September 1830, drew luminaries from the government and industry, including the Prime Minister, the Duke of Wellington. The day started with a procession of eight trains setting out from Liverpool. The parade was led by Northumbrian driven by George Stephenson, and included Phoenix driven by his son Robert, North Star driven by his brother Robert and Rocket driven by assistant engineer Joseph Locke. The day was marred by the death of William Huskisson, the Member of Parliament for Liverpool, who was struck by Rocket. Stephenson evacuated the injured Huskisson to Eccles with a train, but he died from his injuries. Despite the tragedy, the railway was a resounding success. Stephenson became famous, and was offered the position of chief engineer for a wide variety of other railways.

=== Stephenson's skew arch bridge ===
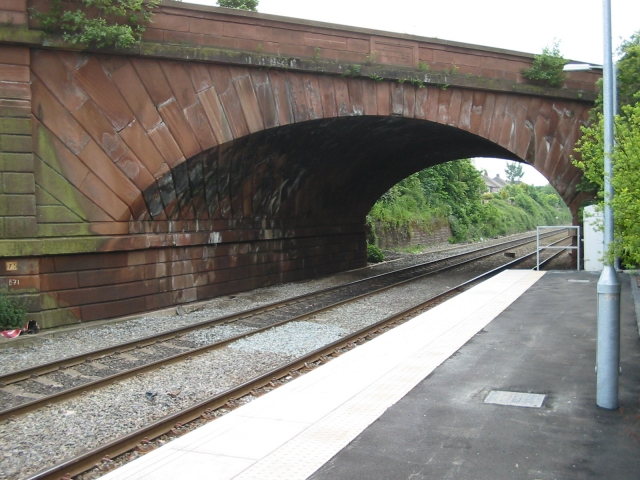
Stephenson's bridge

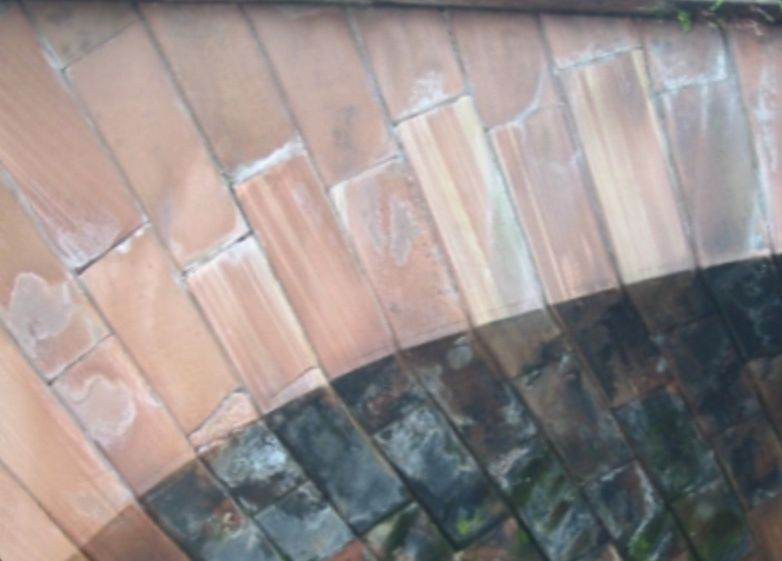
A close-up of the technique

1830 also saw the grand opening of the skew bridge in Rainhill over the Liverpool and Manchester Railway. The bridge was the first to cross any railway at an angle. It required the structure to be constructed as two flat planes (overlapping in this case by 6 ft (1.8 m)) between which the stonework forms a parallelogram shape when viewed from above. It has the effect of flattening the arch and the solution is to lay the bricks forming the arch at an angle to the abutments (the piers on which the arches rest). The technique, which results in a spiral effect in the arch masonry, provides extra strength in the arch to compensate for the angled abutments.

The bridge is still in use at Rainhill station, and carries traffic on the A57 (Warrington Road). The bridge is a listed structure.

== Later life ==
=== Life at Alton Grange ===
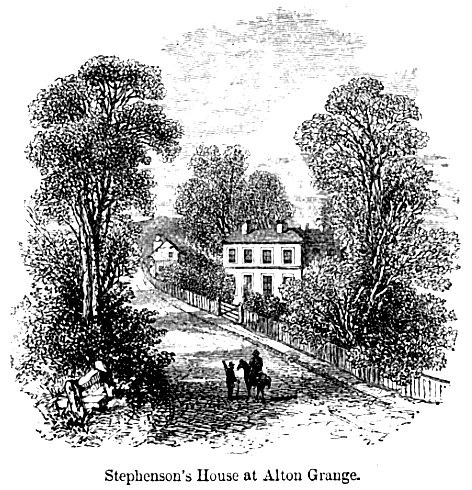
Stephenson's House at Alton Grange

George Stephenson moved to the parish of Alton Grange (now part of Ravenstone) in Leicestershire in 1830, originally to consult on the Leicester and Swannington Railway, a line primarily proposed to take coal from the western coal fields of the county to Leicester. The promoters of the line Mr William Stenson and Mr John Ellis, had difficulties in raising the necessary capital as the majority of local wealth had been invested in canals. Realising the potential and need for the rail link Stephenson himself invested £2,500 and raised the remaining capital through his network of connections in Liverpool. His son Robert was made chief engineer with the first part of the line opening in 1832.

During this same period the Snibston estate in Leicestershire came up for auction, it lay adjoining the proposed Swannington to Leicester route and was believed to contain valuable coal reserves. Stephenson realising the financial potential of the site, given its proximity to the proposed rail link and the fact that the manufacturing town of Leicester was then being supplied coal by canal from Derbyshire, bought the estate.

Employing a previously used method of mining in the midlands called tubbing to access the deep coal seams, his success could not have been greater. Stephenson's coal mine delivered the first rail cars of coal into Leicester dramatically reducing the price of coal and saving the city some £40,000 per annum. Stephenson remained at Alton Grange until 1838 before moving to Tapton House in Derbyshire.

=== Later career ===
The next ten years were the busiest of Stephenson's life as he was besieged with requests from railway promoters. Many of the first American railroad builders came to Newcastle to learn from Stephenson and the first dozen or so locomotives utilised there were purchased from the Stephenson shops. Stephenson's conservative views on the capabilities of locomotives meant he favoured circuitous routes and civil engineering that were more costly than his successors thought necessary. For example, rather than the West Coast Main Line taking the direct route favoured by Joseph Locke over Shap between Lancaster and Carlisle, Stephenson was in favour of a longer sea-level route via Ulverston and Whitehaven. Locke's route was built.

Stephenson tended to be more casual in estimating costs and paperwork in general. He worked with Joseph Locke on the Grand Junction Railway with half of the line allocated to each man. Stephenson's estimates and organising ability proved inferior to those of Locke and the board's dissatisfaction led to Stephenson's resignation causing a rift between them which was never healed.

Despite Stephenson's loss of some routes to competitors due to his caution, he was offered more work than he could cope with, and was unable to accept all that was offered. He worked on the North Midland line from Derby to Leeds, the York and North Midland line from Normanton to York, the Manchester and Leeds, the Birmingham and Derby, the Sheffield and Rotherham among many others.

Stephenson became a reassuring name rather than a cutting-edge technical adviser. He was the first president of the Institution of Mechanical Engineers on its formation in 1847. By this time he had settled into semi-retirement, supervising his mining interests in Derbyshire – tunnelling for the North Midland Railway revealed coal seams, and Stephenson put money into their exploitation.

=== Personal life ===
George first courted Elizabeth (Betty) Hindmarsh, a farmer's daughter from Black Callerton, whom he met secretly in her orchard. Her father refused marriage because of Stephenson's lowly status as a miner. George next paid attention to Anne Henderson where he lodged with her family, but she rejected him and he transferred his attentions to her sister Frances (Fanny), who was nine years his senior. George and Fanny married at Newburn Church on 28 November 1802. They had two children Robert Stephenson (1803) and Fanny (1805) but the latter died within months. George's wife died, probably of tuberculosis, the year after. While George was working in Scotland, Robert was brought up by a succession of neighbours and then by George's unmarried sister Eleanor (Nelly), who lived with them in Killingworth on George's return.

On 29 March 1820, George (now considerably wealthier) married Betty Hindmarsh at Newburn. The marriage seems to have been happy, but there were no children and Betty died on 3 August 1845.

On 11 January 1848, at St Chad's Church in Shrewsbury, Shropshire, George married for the third time, to Ellen Gregory, another farmer's daughter originally from Bakewell in Derbyshire, who had been his housekeeper. Seven months after his wedding, George contracted pleurisy and died, aged 67, at noon on Saturday 12 August 1848 at Tapton House in Chesterfield, Derbyshire. He was buried at Holy Trinity Church, Chesterfield, alongside his second wife.

Described by Rolt as a generous man, Stephenson financially supported the wives and families of several who had died in his employment, due to accident or misadventure, some within his family, and some not. He was also a keen gardener throughout his life; during his last years at Tapton House, he built hothouses in the estate gardens, growing exotic fruits and vegetables in a 'not too friendly' rivalry with Joseph Paxton, head gardener at nearby Chatsworth House, twice beating the master of the craft.

==== Descendants ====
George Stephenson had two children. His son Robert was born on 16 October 1803. Robert married Frances Sanderson, daughter of a City of London professional John Sanderson, on 17 June 1829. Robert died in 1859 having had no children. Robert Stephenson expanded on the work of his father and became a major railway engineer himself. Abroad, Robert was involved in the Alexandria–Cairo railway that later connected with the Suez Canal. George Stephenson's daughter was born in 1805 but died within weeks of her birth. Descendants of the wider Stephenson family continue to live in Wylam (Stephenson's birthplace) today. Also relatives connected by his marriage live in Derbyshire. Some descendants later emigrated to Perth, Australia, and Minnesota, with later generations remaining to this day.

This Stephenson engineering family is not to be confused with the lighthouse-building engineering family of Robert Stevenson, which was active in the same era.

== Legacy ==
=== Influence ===
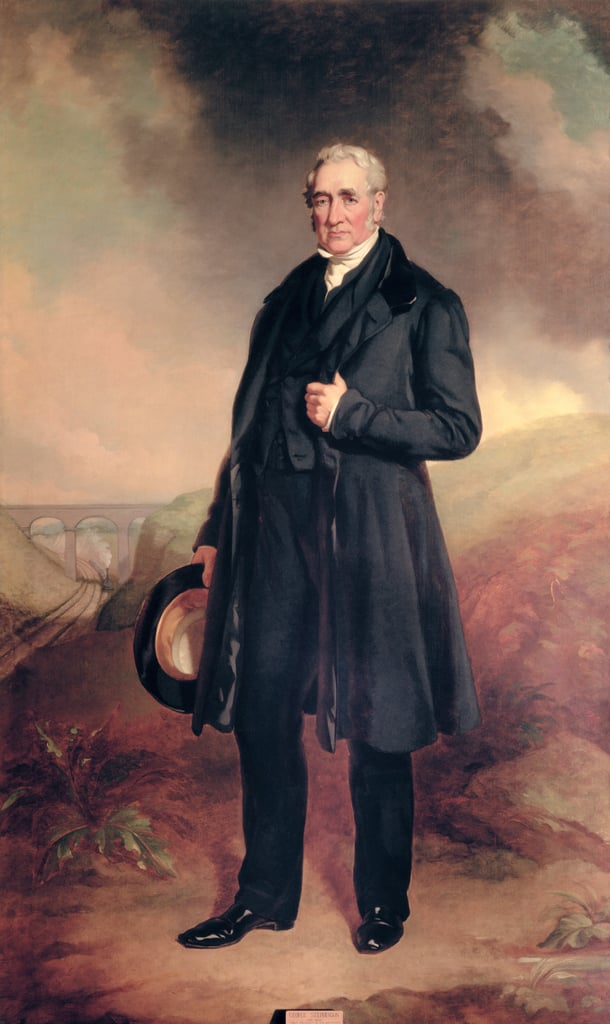
Portrait of George Stephenson by painter John Lucas

Britain led the world in the development of railways which acted as a stimulus for the Industrial Revolution by facilitating the transport of raw materials and manufactured goods. George Stephenson, with his work on the Stockton and Darlington Railway and the Liverpool and Manchester Railway, paved the way for the railway engineers who followed, such as his son Robert, his assistant Joseph Locke who carried out much work on his own account and Isambard Kingdom Brunel. Stephenson was farsighted in realising that the individual lines being built would eventually be joined, and would need to have the same gauge. The standard gauge used throughout much of the world is due to him. In 2002, Stephenson was named in the BBC's television show and list of the 100 Greatest Britons following a UK-wide vote, placing at no. 65.

The Victorian self-help advocate Samuel Smiles had published his first biography of George Stephenson in 1857, and although attacked as biased in the favour of George at the expense of his rivals as well as his son, it was popular and 250,000 copies were sold by 1904. The Band of Hope were selling biographies of George in 1859 at a penny a sheet, and at one point there was a suggestion to move George's body to Westminster Abbey. The centenary of George's birth was celebrated in 1881 at Crystal Palace by 15,000 people, and it was George who was featured on the reverse of the Series E five pound note issued by the Bank of England between 1990 and 2003. The Stephenson Railway Museum in North Shields is named after George and Robert Stephenson.

=== Memorials ===
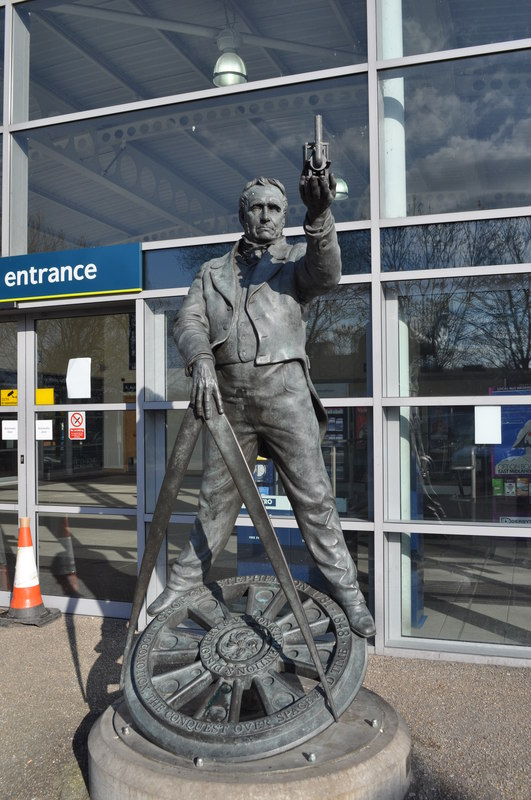
Stephenson's statue in Chesterfield

George Stephenson's Birthplace is an 18th-century historic house museum in the village of Wylam, Northumberland, England, and is operated by the National Trust; it is now only open to the public for special events. Dial Cottage at West Moor, his home between 1803–1815, remains in situ and is Grade II* listed, but the museum that once operated there has closed.

In 1862, a memorial to Stephenson by John Graham Lough was erected close to Newcastle Central Station, in his hometown of Newcastle upon Tyne. The memorial shows a bronze statue of Stephenson on a grit-stone base, with four further bronze figures (an engineer, blacksmith, miner, and plate-layer) at the four corners of the base. The statue is Grade II listed.

Chesterfield Museum in Chesterfield, Derbyshire, has a gallery of Stephenson memorabilia, including straight thick glass tubes he invented for growing straight cucumbers. The museum is in the Stephenson Memorial Hall, not far from both Stephenson's final home at Tapton House and Holy Trinity Church within which is his vault. In Liverpool, where he lived at 34 Upper Parliament Street, a City of Liverpool Heritage Plaque is situated next to the front door. A bronze statue of Stephenson was unveiled at Chesterfield railway station (in the town where Stephenson spent the last ten years of his life) on 28 October 2005, marking the completion of improvements to the station. At the event a full-size working replica of the Rocket was on show, which then spent two days on public display at the Chesterfield Market Festival.

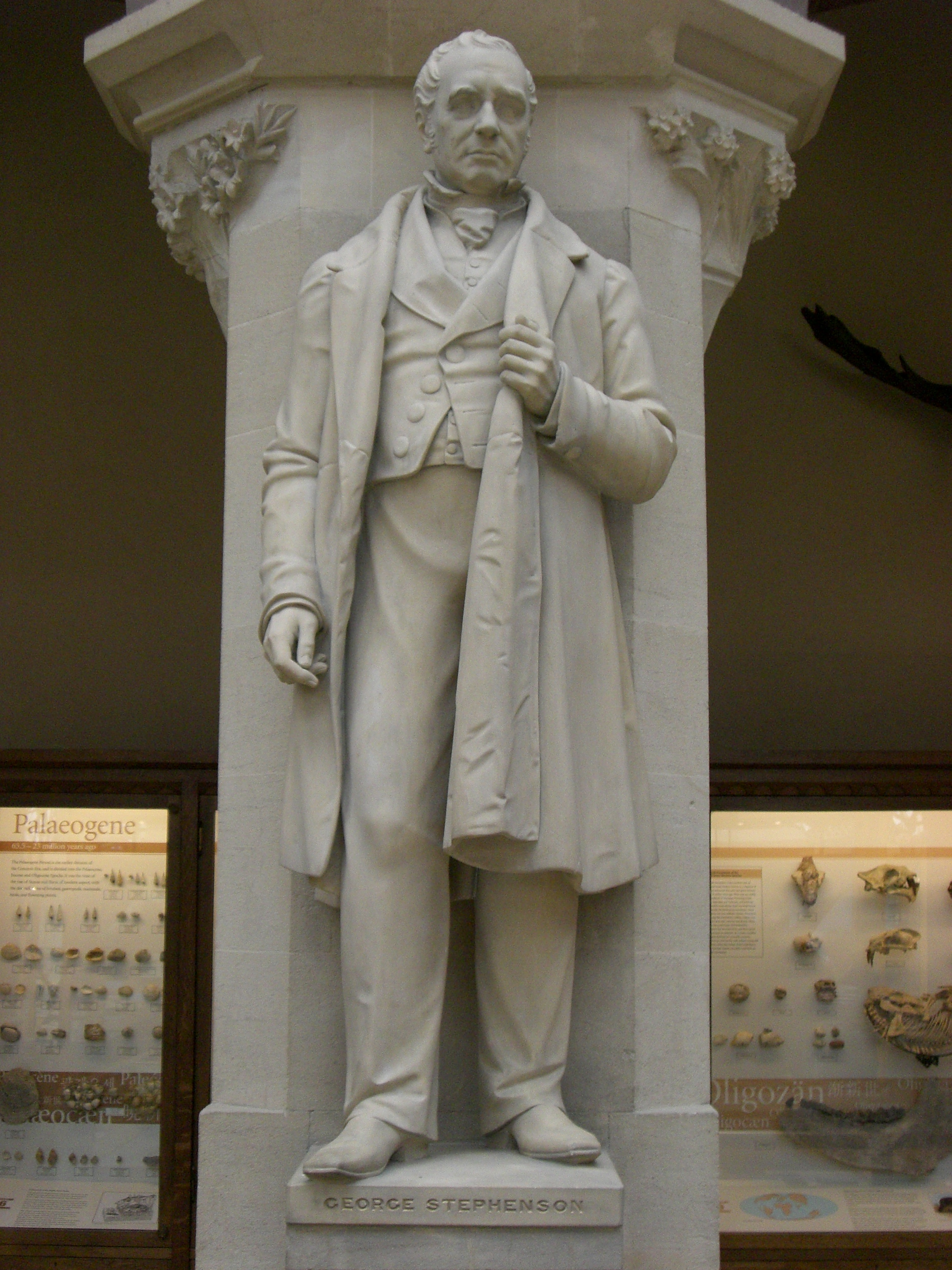
Statue of Stephenson at the Oxford University Museum of Natural History

Stephenson College at Durham University, founded in 2001 on Queen's Campus in Stockton-on-Tees but relocated to Durham in 2018, is named after him. Also named after him and his son is George Stephenson High School in Killingworth, Stephenson Memorial Primary School in Howdon, the Stephenson Railway Museum in North Shields, the Stephenson Locomotive Society, the Stephenson Centre, an SEBD Unit of Beaumont Hill School in Darlington, and the Stephenson Building, home of the school of engineering at Newcastle University. His last home in Tapton, Chesterfield is now part of Chesterfield College and is called Tapton House Campus. A statue of Stephenson is located at the Oxford University Museum of Natural History.

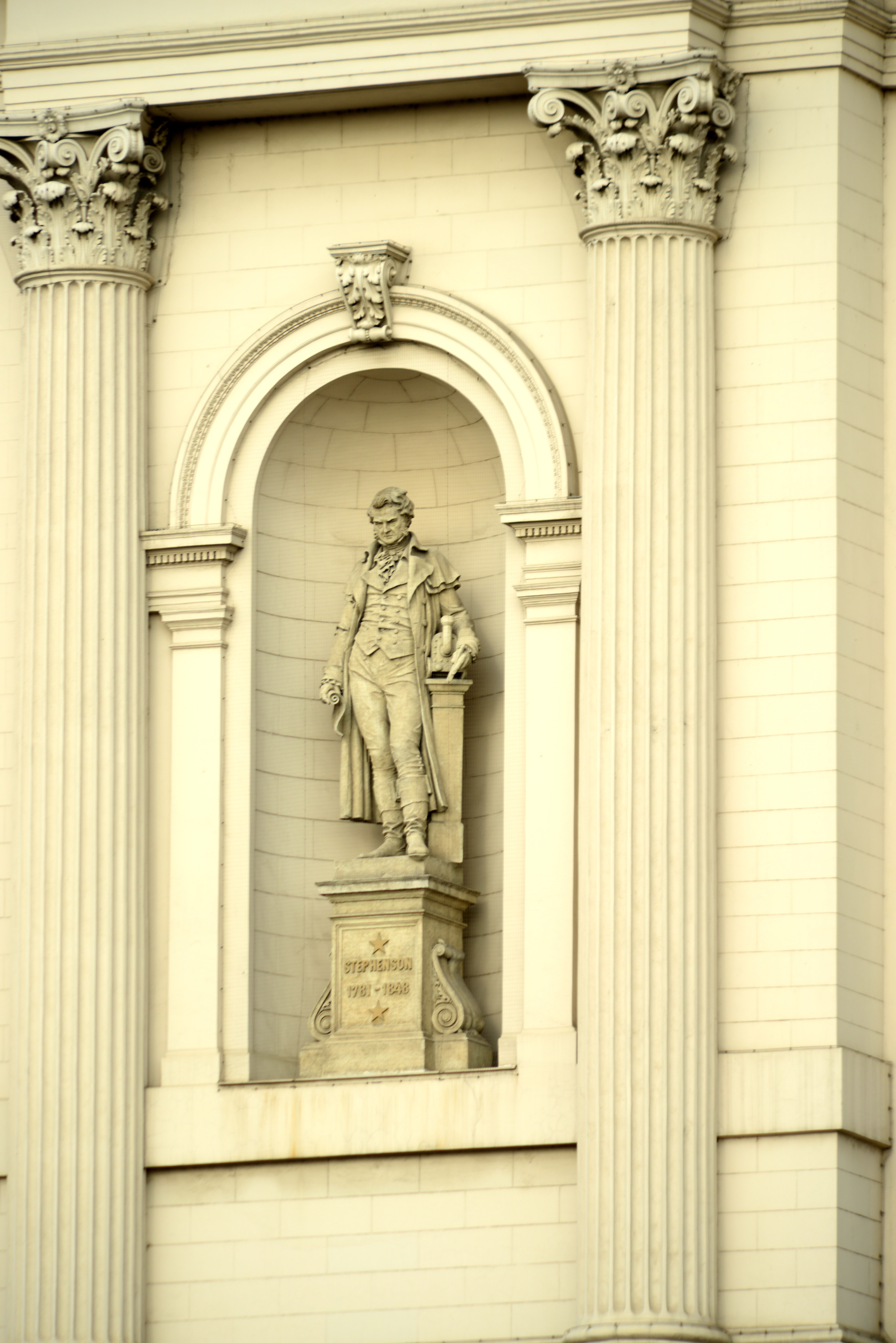
Stephenson statue in Budapest

From 1990 until 2003, Stephenson's portrait appeared on the reverse of Series E £5 notes issued by the Bank of England. Stephenson's face is shown alongside an engraving of the Rocket steam engine and the Skerne Bridge on the Stockton to Darlington Railway.

Stephenson's profile is carved in the facade of Lisbon's Victorian railway station. North-western Milan has the street Via Giorgio Stephenson in his honour. A large statue of Stephenson – paired with one of James Watt – adorns the main façade of Budapest Keleti station.

=== In popular culture ===
Stephenson was portrayed by actor Gawn Grainger on television in the 1985 Doctor Who serial The Mark of the Rani.

Harry Turtledove's alternate history short story "The Iron Elephant" depicts a race between a newly invented steam engine and a mammoth-drawn train in 1782. A station master called George Stephenson features as a minor character alongside an American steam engineer called Richard Trevithick, likely indicating that they were analogous rather than historical characters.

== See also ==
- History of Science and Technology
- Industrial Revolution
- Train
- Robert Stephenson
- Robert Stephenson and Company

== Footnotes ==
Professional and academic associations
First	President of the Institution of Mechanical Engineers; 1847–1848	Succeeded by Robert Stephenson
