= Susan Blanchard Elder =

American writer (1835–1923)

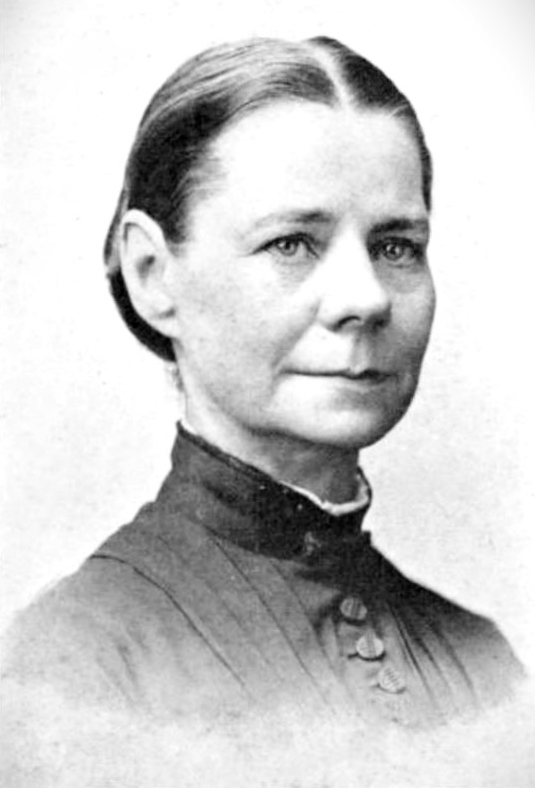
- Born: April 19, 1835; Fort Jessup, Sabine Parish, Louisiana, U.S.
- Died: November 3, 1923 (aged 88); Cincinnati, Ohio, U.S.
- Other names: Hermine
- Occupation: Writer
- Known for: Contributions to literature, particularly focusing on family, religion, and the American South
- Spouse: Charles D. Elder

Susan Blanchard Elder (April 19, 1835 – November 3, 1923) was an American writer known for her contributions to literature, particularly focusing on themes of family, religion, and the American South. She was born in Fort Jessup, Sabine Parish, Louisiana, to Albert Gallatin Blanchard, a military officer, and Susan Thompson. Despite her father's military obligations, which often took him away from home, Susan spent her formative years in both the North and South.

== Biography ==
=== Early life and education ===
Elder was born on April 19, 1835, in Fort Jessup, Sabine Parish, Louisiana, to Albert Gallatin Blanchard, a military officer in both the U.S. and Confederate armies, and Susan Thompson. Following her mother's death during her childhood and her father's military duties, she spent several of her formative years living with relatives in the North. She later returned to Louisiana as a teenager and received education at the Girls' High School of New Orleans and St. Michael's Convent of the Sacred Heart in St. James Parish.

=== Marriage and career ===
During her adolescence, using the pen name "Hermine," Elder began publishing poems, essays, and stories in local newspapers. Notable examples from this period include the poems "Babies" and "First Ride." In 1855, she converted to Catholicism and married Charles D. Elder, brother of William H. Elder, the Archbishop of Cincinnati. The couple relocated to Selma, Alabama, during the Civil War, where they established their home as a Confederate hospital. After the war, they returned to New Orleans, where Elder pursued a career in education, teaching math and natural science at various institutions.

=== Literary contributions ===
Elder's literary career flourished post-war, with her writings published in several Roman Catholic periodicals. She served on the editorial staff of the Morning Star from 1882 to 1890, contributing extensively to Catholic publications. Her works encompassed a range of genres, with a particular emphasis on historical novels. Notable publications include James the Second (1874) and The Leos of the Papacy (1879).

=== Legacy and later years ===
Susan Blanchard Elder's notable literary contributions include The Life of Abbé Adrien Rouquette (1913), a biographical study of the poet-priest and missionary to the Louisiana Choctaw Native Americans. Her novel Ellen Fitzgerald (1876) and patriotic work A Mosaic of Blue and Gray (1914) reflect her interest in Southern themes.

In her later years, Elder resided in Cincinnati with her daughter until her death on November 3, 1923.

== Bibliography ==
- Pierce, Jacklyn R. (February 2000). "Elder, Susan Blanchard". American National Biography. New York: Oxford University Press. doi:10.1093/anb/9780198606697.article.1600500. (subscription required)
- Davidson, James Wood (1869). The Living Writers of the South. Carleton. pp. 177–179. ISBN 978-0-608-42818-5.
- Tardy, Mary T. (1872). The Living Female Writers of the South. Gale Research Company. pp. 128–131. ISBN 978-0-8103-4286-6.
