= Lyon, Hetton colliery railway =

Lyon
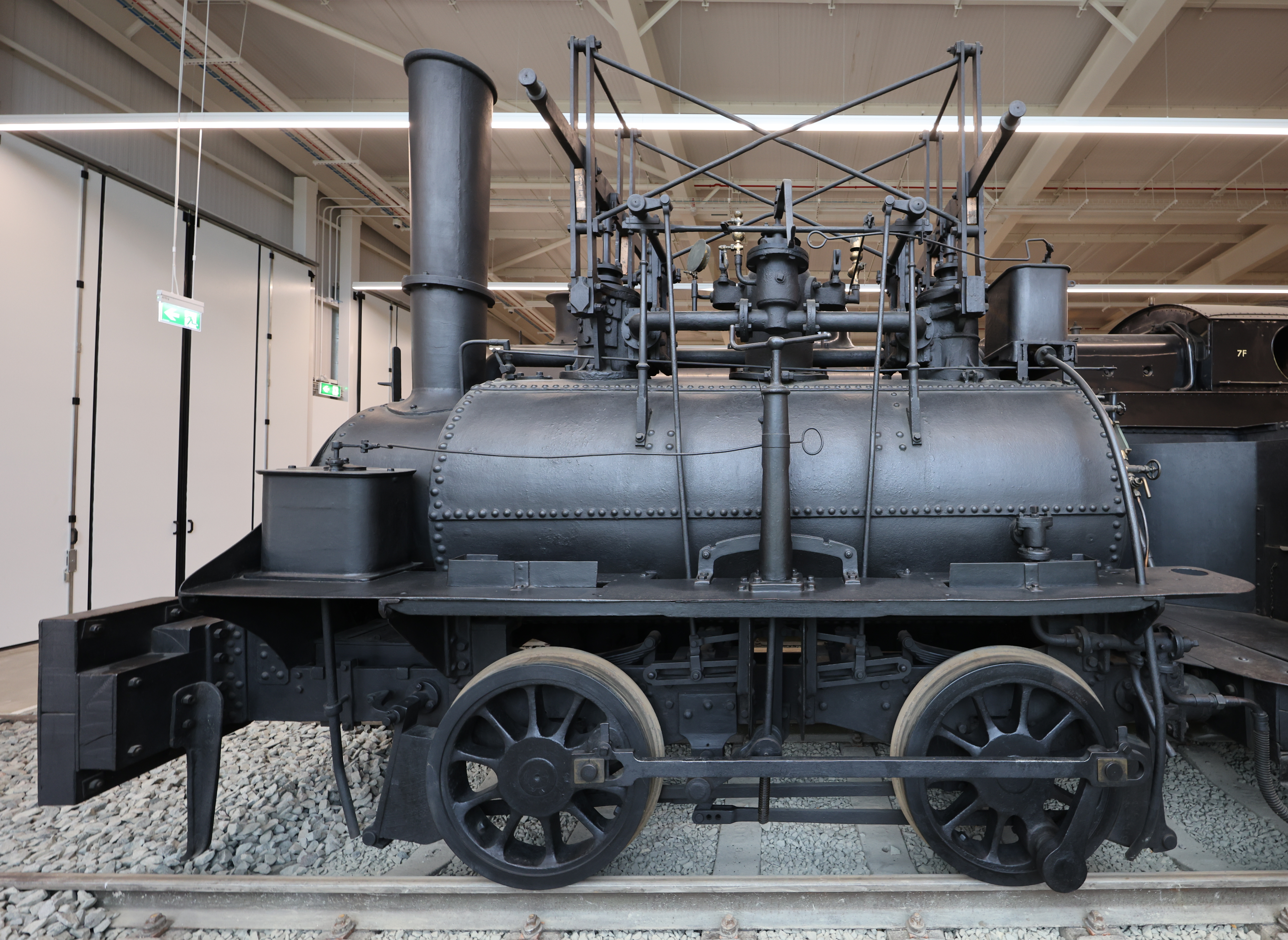
- In the Shildon museum, 2025
Type and origin
- Build date: 1852
- Rebuild date: 1882
Specifications
- Configuration
  - Whyte: 0-4-0
- Gauge: 4 ft 8 1/2 in (1,435 mm) standard gauge
- Driver dia.: 3 feet (0.91 m)
- Boiler pressure: 80 psi (550 kPa)
- Cylinders: 2
Career
- Withdrawn: 1912

The Hetton Colliery Lyon is an early British steam locomotive that still survives in preservation. It is remarkable for having continued working into the early 20th century.

== Hetton Colliery ==
The Hetton colliery railway opened in 1822 with steam traction. Although once thought to date from this time, Lyon is now thought to have been built by the colliery in 1851–52. Its designer is thought to be an engineer named Young. A descendant, David Young, now works on the restoration of steam engines at Beamish. Lyon would have been of archaic design by 1852. The view has been put forward that it was one of a pair of replicas built by Sir Lindsay Wood (1834–1920) from interest in his father Nicholas Wood's earlier designs. The other example was destroyed by a boiler explosion in 1858/1859.

== 1882 rebuilding ==
It was extensively rebuilt in 1882. This included modern features, such as paired Salter spring balance safety valves.

== Late service ==
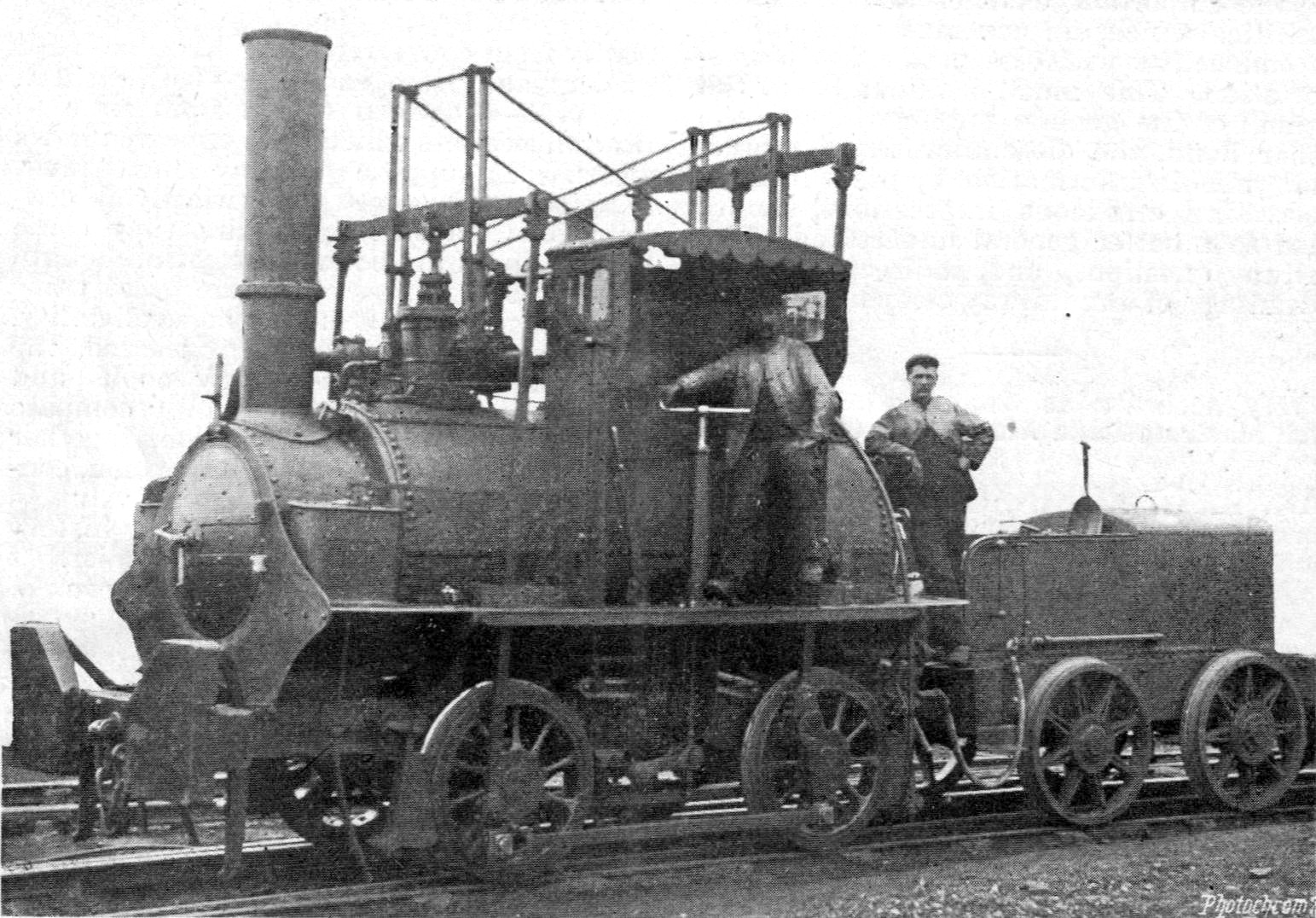
Photograph appearing in a 1905 edition of The Railway Magazine

The locomotive continued in service at Hetton colliery until either 1908 or 1912. This was already remarkable at the time and a photograph of it was published in The Railway Magazine in 1905.

It worked out its last days at the colliery driving machinery in the pit sawmill. (Note: A similar fate befell the Liverpool & Manchester Railway Lion, which survived into preservation by having been used as a stationary pumping engine.)

== Preservation ==
In 1925, the Stockton and Darlington Railway celebrated its centenary. The LNER organised a cavalcade of locomotives to commemorate this. Locomotion No. 1 was propelled by a dummy petrol engine in its tender, but Lyon was steamed and ran under its own power, leading the cavalcade of fifty three locomotives.

The locomotive became part of the initial collection of the National Railway Museum at York. In 1974 was loaned to the new Beamish Museum where it was initially displayed in the Colliery and latterly at the Waggonway, together with working replicas of contemporary locomotives. (Note: Now comprising Locomotion, Steam Elephant and Puffing Billy)

In 2006 it was moved to the Locomotion museum at Shildon, but returned to Beamish in May 2011.

== Dating ==
There is some debate over the locomotive's original construction date, and even its name. Lowe (1975) gives the name as Lyons, (Note: Although applying it to a different locomotive) but most current sources favour Lyon. Both are probably derived from the name of Hetton Lyons Colliery, which closed in 1960 and is now the site of an industrial estate and a country park.

The Hetton colliery railway used steam locomotives from the outset; four built in 1820 and one in 1822. They were developments of George Stephenson's earlier Killingworth design. These were of 0-4-0 arrangement with two vertical cylinders, one above each axle, and the wheels coupled by drive chains. They used steam springs for suspension, there not yet being a way of forging an adequate steel spring to carry the weight of a locomotive.

For many years, before and during preservation, it was thought that Lyon was one of this original group of locomotives, built in 1822. Lowe describes four named 1820 locomotives and an unnamed 1822 locomotive, which he identifies as this one, the only one to be preserved. Its designers were held to be George Stephenson and Nicholas Wood.

It is now thought to have first been constructed in 1852, some years after Stephenson's death. (Note: Stephenson died in 1848) The design is little changed from Stephenson locomotives of the 1820s (i.e. before Rocket) and this confused early researchers. The use of either the single flued boiler or the vertical cylinders were obsolete by Rocket. One distinctive difference from these locomotives was the enlarged smokebox with an easily opened door, providing more space for and easier cleaning of ashes. (Note: Samuel Smiles in 1857 illustrates this separate smokebox ahead of the boiler shell in what he describes as the 1816 Killingworth locomotive Nº 2, but it was not in use for Locomotion of 1825. It is possible that Smiles is illustrating a later modification to the Killingworth locomotives, or even mis-identifying Lyon, even though that would be a quite new locomotive at this time.)

== Vertical-boilered Lyons ==
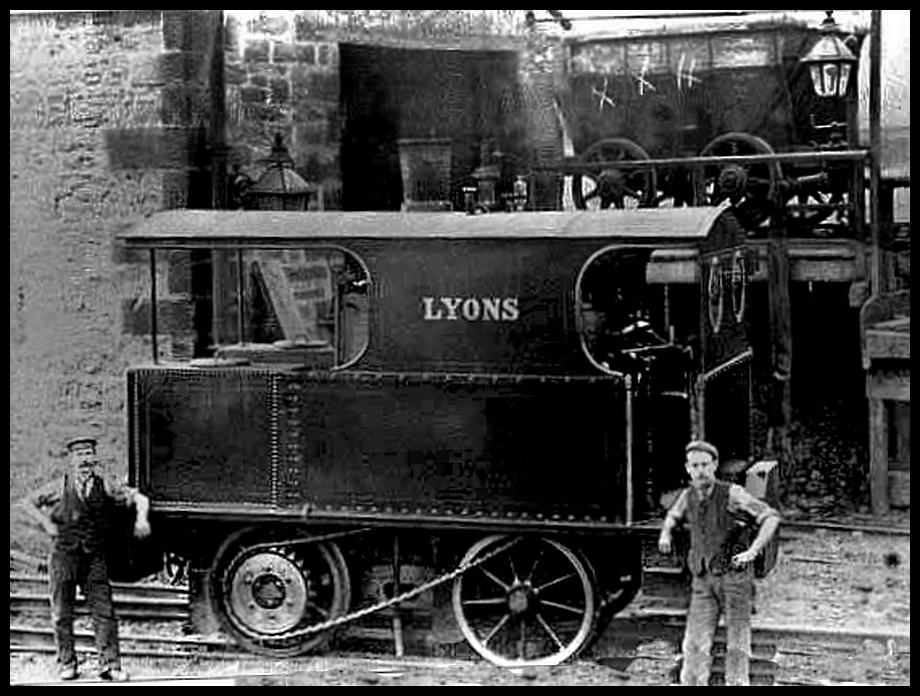
The vertical-boilered Lyons in 1901

Two quite separate locomotives, Lyons and Eppleton, were built at the colliery much later on, (Note: Some time between 1884, and Hetton's profitable expansion as a limited company, and 1901) similar to those also built locally by Head Wrightson. These were small vertical-boilered well tank, with chain drive from a small vertical engine. Lyons locomotive was described in The Locomotive Magazine in 1901.

Lowe's view is that Lyon dates from 1822 and the Lyons he describes is this later locomotive with a vertical boiler and chain drive.
