= Killingworth locomotives =

Early experimental steam locomotives

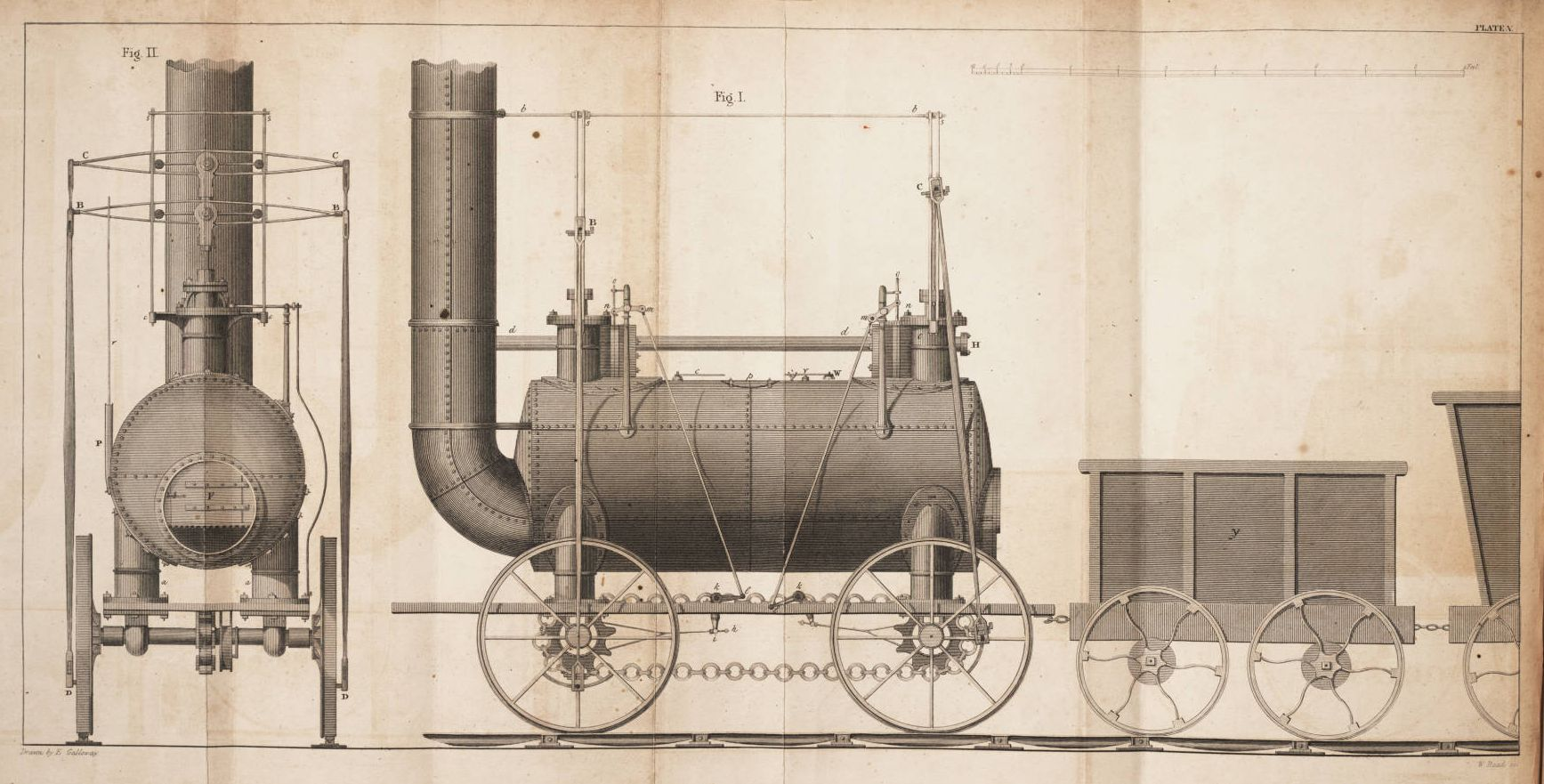
- One of the Killingworth engines
Type and origin
- Power type: Steam
- Builder: George Stephenson
- Build date: 1814
Specifications
- Gauge: 4 ft 8 in (1,422 mm)
- Loco weight: 6 long tons (6.1 t)
- Boiler: 2 ft 10 in (864 mm) dia × 8 ft 0 in (2,438 mm) long
- Cylinder size: 8 in × 24 in (203 mm × 610 mm)
- Loco brake: ?
- Train brakes: None
Career
- Operators: Killingworth Colliery

George Stephenson built a number of experimental steam locomotives to work in the Killingworth Colliery between 1814 and 1826.

== Background ==
George Stephenson was appointed as engine-wright at Killingworth Colliery in 1812 and immediately improved the haulage of the coal from the mine using fixed engines. But he had taken an interest in Blenkinsop's engines in Leeds and Blackett's experiments at Wylam colliery, where he had been born. By 1814 he persuaded the lessees of the colliery to fund a "travelling engine" which first ran on 25 July. By experiment he confirmed Blackett's observation that the friction of the wheels was sufficient on an iron railway without cogs but still used a cogwheel system in transmitting power to the wheels.

== Blücher ==
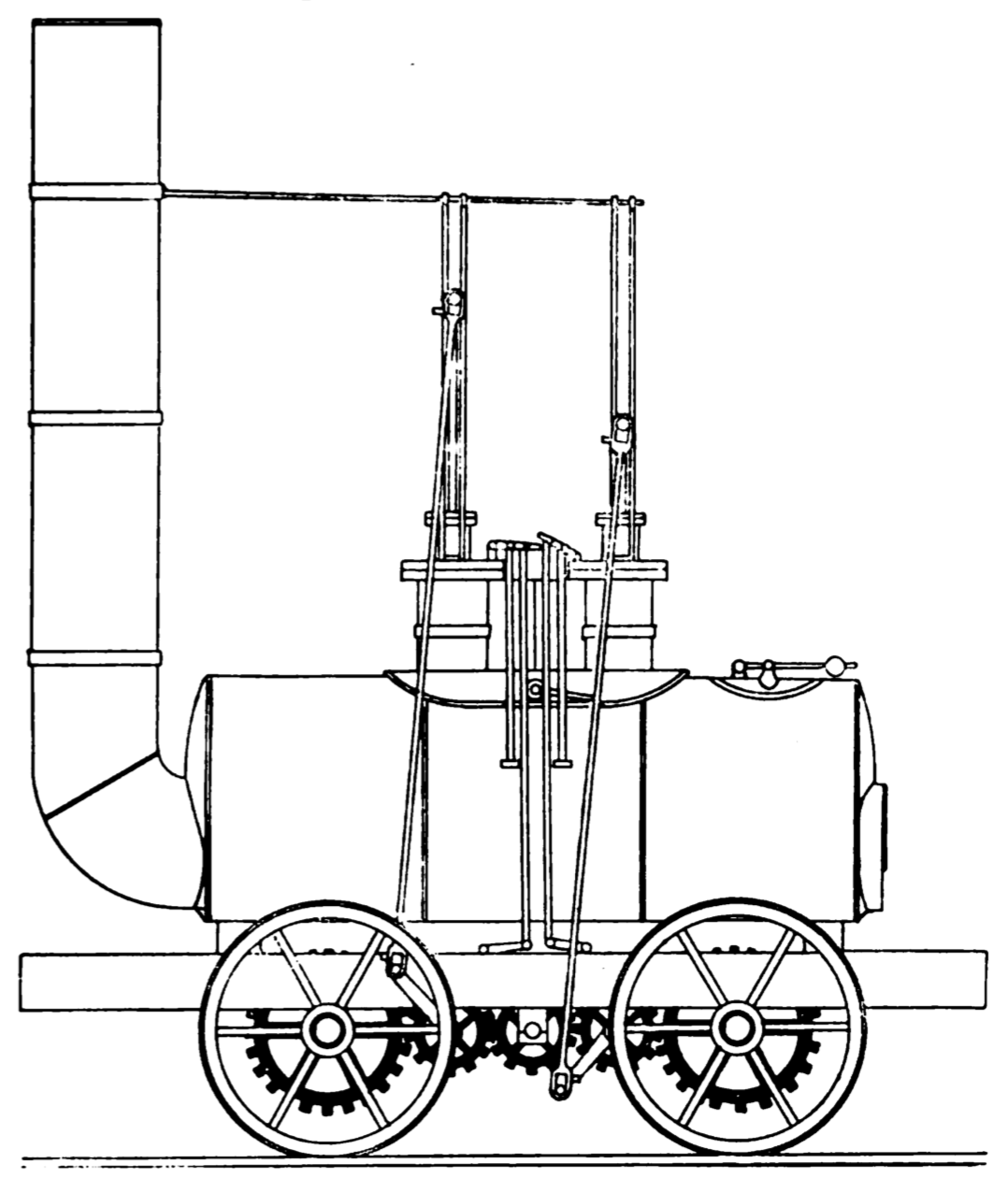
Drawing of Blücher by Clement E. Stretton

Blücher (often spelled Blutcher) was built by George Stephenson in 1814; the first of a series of locomotives that he designed in the period 1814–16 which established his reputation as an engine designer and laid the foundations for his subsequent pivotal role in the development of the railways. It could pull a train of 30 long tons (30 t) at a speed of 4 miles per hour (6.4 km/h) up a gradient of 1 in 450. It was named after the Prussian general Gebhard Leberecht von Blücher, who, after a speedy march, arrived in time to help defeat Napoleon at the Battle of Waterloo in 1815.

Stephenson carefully measured its performance and realised that overall it saved little money compared with the use of horses, even though the price of corn was at an all-time high because of the wars. He made one significant improvement by redirecting the steam outlet from the cylinders into the smoke stack, thereby increasing the efficiency of the boiler markedly as well as lessening the annoyance caused by the escaping steam.

Blücher's performance was described in the second 1814 volume of the Annals of Philosophy. The item started by recording a rack locomotive at Leeds (probably Salamanca) and continued: "The experiment succeeded so well at Leeds, that a similar engine has been erected at Newcastle, about a mile north from that town. It moves at the rate of three miles an hour, dragging after it 14 waggons, loaded each with about two tons of coals; so that in this case the expense of 14 horses is saved by the substitution of the steam-engine". The item continues to mention a locomotive without a rack wheel (probably Puffing Billy at Wylam).

Blücher did not survive: Stephenson recycled its parts as he developed more advanced models.

== 1815 locomotive ==
By 28 February 1815 Stephenson had made enough improvements to file a patent with the overseer of the colliery, Ralph Dodds. This specified direct communication between cylinder and wheels using a ball and socket joint. The drive wheels were connected by chains, which were abandoned after a few years in favour of direct connections. A new locomotive constructed on these principles was put into operation.

== Wellington ==
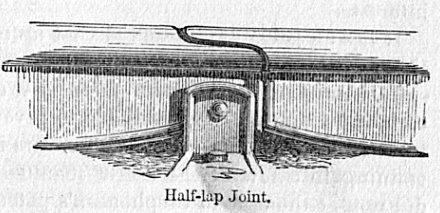
Half-lap jointed fishbelly rail patented in 1816

The big impediment revealed by the first two engines was the state of the permanent way and the lack of any cushioning suspension. The track was often carelessly laid and with rails of only 3 feet (91 cm) in length there were frequent derailments. He devised a new chair and used half-lap joints between the rails instead of butt-joints. Wrought iron replaced cast iron wheels and he used the steam pressure of the boiler to provide 'steam spring' suspension for the engine. These improvements were detailed in a patent filed with the iron-founder Mr. Losh of Newcastle on 30 September 1816.

Together with the head viewer, Nicholas Wood, Stephenson conducted in 1818 a careful series of measurements on friction and the effects of inclines, or declivities as they were generally called, using a dynamometer which they developed. These were to stand him in good stead in later developments of the railways.

Engines constructed on these principles from 1816 were being used until 1841 as locomotives and until 1856 as stationary engines. One of these was called Wellington and another My Lord.

== Killingworth Billy ==
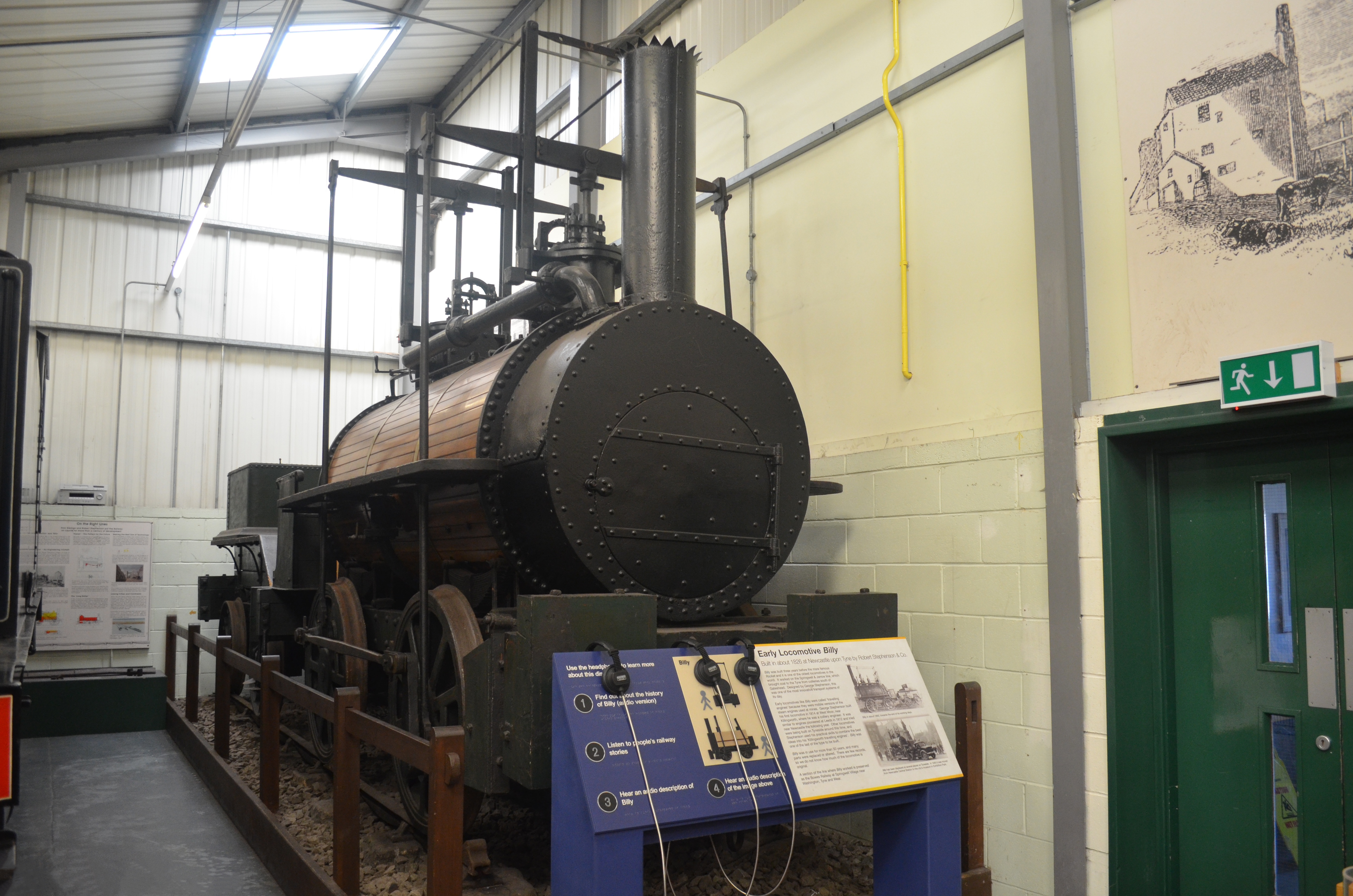
Killingworth Billy at the North Tyneside Steam Railway

The Killingworth Billy or Billy (not to be confused with Puffing Billy) was built to Stephenson's design at Killingworth Colliery’s workshops. Previously thought to have been built in 1826, an archeological investigation in 2018 revised its construction date back by a further decade to 1816, making Billy the third-oldest surviving locomotive and the oldest standard gauge locomotive.

Billy ran on the Killingworth Railway until 1881, when it was presented to the City of Newcastle-upon-Tyne. For the next fifteen years the locomotive stood on a plinth above the roadway at the Newcastle end of the High Level Bridge. It was then moved to Newcastle Central Station, where it remained on display until 1945, when it was moved to the Museum of Science and Industry in the city's Exhibition Park. It is currently preserved at the Stephenson Steam Railway Museum on North Tyneside.
