= Albert G. Blanchard =

Confederate Army general

Albert Gallatin Blanchard
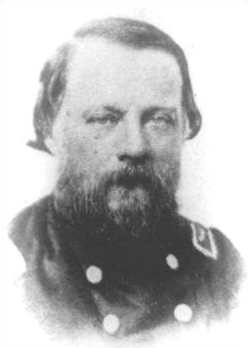
- Albert G. Blanchard
- Born: September 6, 1810; Charlestown, Massachusetts, US
- Died: June 21, 1891 (aged 80); New Orleans, Louisiana, US
- Burial place: St. Louis Cemetery No.2, New Orleans, Louisiana
- Military career
- Allegiance: United States; Confederate States of America
- Branch: US Army; Confederate States Army
- Service years: 1829–1840; 1846–1848 (USA); 1861–1865 (CSA)
- Rank: Major (USA); Brigadier General (CSA)
- Units: 3rd U.S. Infantry Regiment; 2nd Louisiana Volunteers; 12th U.S. Infantry Regiment
- Commands: 1st Louisiana Infantry Regiment; Blanchard's Brigade; Blanchard's Reserve Brigade
- Conflicts: Mexican-American War; American Civil War

Albert Gallatin Blanchard (September 6, 1810 – June 21, 1891) was a general in the Confederate army during the American Civil War. He was among the small number of high-ranking Confederates to have been born in the North. He served on the Atlantic Coast early in the war, commanding a brigade in Virginia before being reassigned to administrative duty due to his age and health. Furthermore, he then led troops during the Carolinas campaign in 1865.

== Early life and career ==
Blanchard was born in Charlestown, Massachusetts. He accepted an appointment to the United States Military Academy in West Point, New York, and graduated 26th in the Class of 1829. Among his classmates was Robert E. Lee. Initially given the rank of brevet second lieutenant in the 3rd U.S. Infantry, he was assigned to various bases on the Western frontier duty, as well as performing recruiting services and helping engineer improvement to the Sabine River. Blanchard served in the United States Army for eleven years before resigning his commission as a first lieutenant in 1840.

He had a son and daughter by his first wife who died young. His first daughter was Susan Blanchard who later became a noted writer. She married Charles D. Elder of New Orleans. General Blanchard's second wife was Marie Louise Herminie Benoist whom he married in January 1839. The couple moved to her hometown of New Orleans, Louisiana, in the 1840s. He entered the mercantile business there and served as a director of the city's public schools.

Blanchard returned to the army in May 1846 with the outbreak of the Mexican War, serving as a captain of the volunteer "Phoenix Company" in the 2nd Louisiana Infantry. Serving with distinction in the Battle of Monterrey and the Siege of Vera Cruz, he was commissioned as a major in the Regular Army in the 12th U.S. Infantry. After the war, he returned to New Orleans and became a teacher in the public schools until 1850. After working a few years as a surveyor, he went to work as secretary and treasurer for two local railroad companies, including the New Orleans and Carrollton Railroad.

== Civil War ==
When the Civil War erupted in 1861, Blanchard offered his services to his adopted state and received a commission as the colonel of the 1st Louisiana Infantry regiment. After drilling and training his men, they were transported to Norfolk, Virginia. In May, Blanchard took charge of two divisions under Maj. Gen. Benjamin Huger. He was promoted to brigadier general on September 21, 1861, and given command of a brigade posted at Portsmouth, Virginia. His brigade was present at the Battle of Seven Pines, but held in reserve. Afterward, he was replaced by Ambrose R. Wright because of his advancing age and the desire for a younger officer to lead the brigade in the field.

Blanchard served in a variety of administrative posts for much of the rest of the war. He served on the court of inquiry for Seth M. Barton in May 1864. In November, he was among the Confederate generals defending Augusta, Georgia, during Sherman's March to the Sea. He led the South Carolina Reserve Brigade in the division of Lafayette McLaws during the Carolinas Campaign, including at the battles of Averasborough and Bentonville.

== Postbellum activities ==
After the war, Blanchard returned to New Orleans and worked as an assistant city surveyor for the rest of his life. He was an active member of the New Orleans Academy of Sciences for many years.

He died at the age of 80 in New Orleans, Louisiana and was buried there in St. Louis Cemetery No. 1. Furthermore, he is one of nearly two dozen Confederate generals buried in Louisiana.

His diary of his Mexican War experiences is archived in the Louisiana State Museum.

== See also ==
- List of American Civil War generals (Confederate)
