= New Orleans and Carrollton Railroad =

Short-line rail system connecting New Orleans with surrounding neighborhoods

The New Orleans and Carrollton Railroad (originally Rail Road) was one of six short-line rail systems built to connect the city of New Orleans, Louisiana, with surrounding neighborhoods, in this case, four-and-a-half miles to the resort village of Carrollton. It was one of the first public transit trolley systems built in the urban United States.

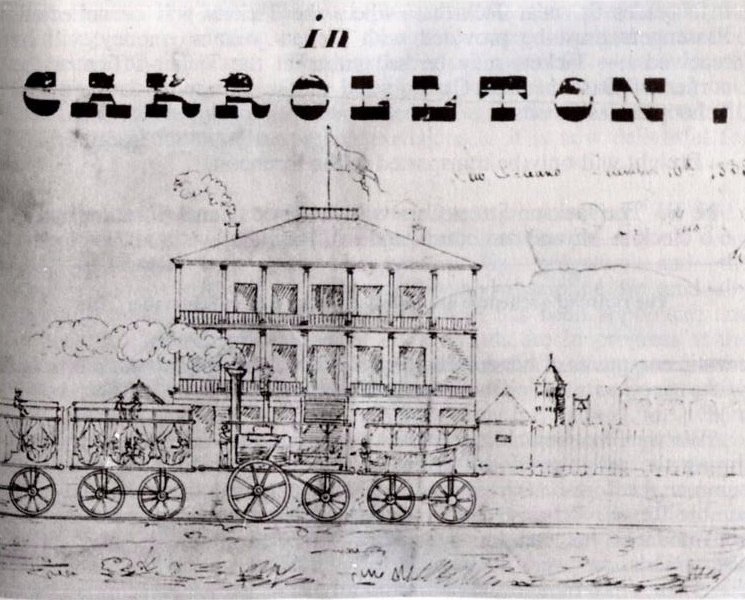
View of a 2-2-0 steam locomotive, probably by B. Hick and Sons, with carriages at the Carrollton Hotel 16 December 1835, by C. Rothaas

The line was chartered in 1833, and opened for business two years later. It was constructed with a track gauge of 4 ft 8 in (1,422 mm) and was the only one of the New Orleans suburban railways to use locomotives to pull the passenger cars (the other five used horses or mules). The street railroads provided low cost and convenient public transportation for New Orleans' residents. Prior to the Civil War, hundreds of people took the train to Carrollton to tour the famed Carrollton Gardens or to dine at the Carrollton House or another of the village's restaurants. Among the antebellum officials was the line's secretary, Albert Blanchard, who would become a Confederate brigadier general in the Civil War.

During the war, the line continued periodic operation, despite the Federal army occupying the city. Ridership and revenues were drastically reduced, and the railroad suffered financially.

Following the Civil War, the line was leased to former Confederate general P. G. T. Beauregard who had left the New Orleans, Jackson and Great Northern, who, with two financial backers, assumed control of the NO&CRR in April 1866. However, his partners proved untrustworthy, and Beauregard was publicly embarrassed when the line failed to pay its debts within a few years. However, the railroad survived. The line evolved into an urban tram line as the land along the route was developed and incorporated into the city of New Orleans. It is now the St. Charles Avenue Streetcar Line. In 1922 the New Orleans & Carrollton Rail Road was merged into New Orleans Public Service Incorporated (NOPSI), which consolidated the city's various streetcar lines and electrical production. In 1983, NOPSI became part of privately owned Entergy, and transferred all transportation operations to the New Orleans Regional Transit Authority (NORTA).

== See also ==
- Pontchartrain Railroad
- 4 ft 8 in gauge railway
- 4 ft 8 in (1,422 mm)
