= Pontchartrain Railroad =

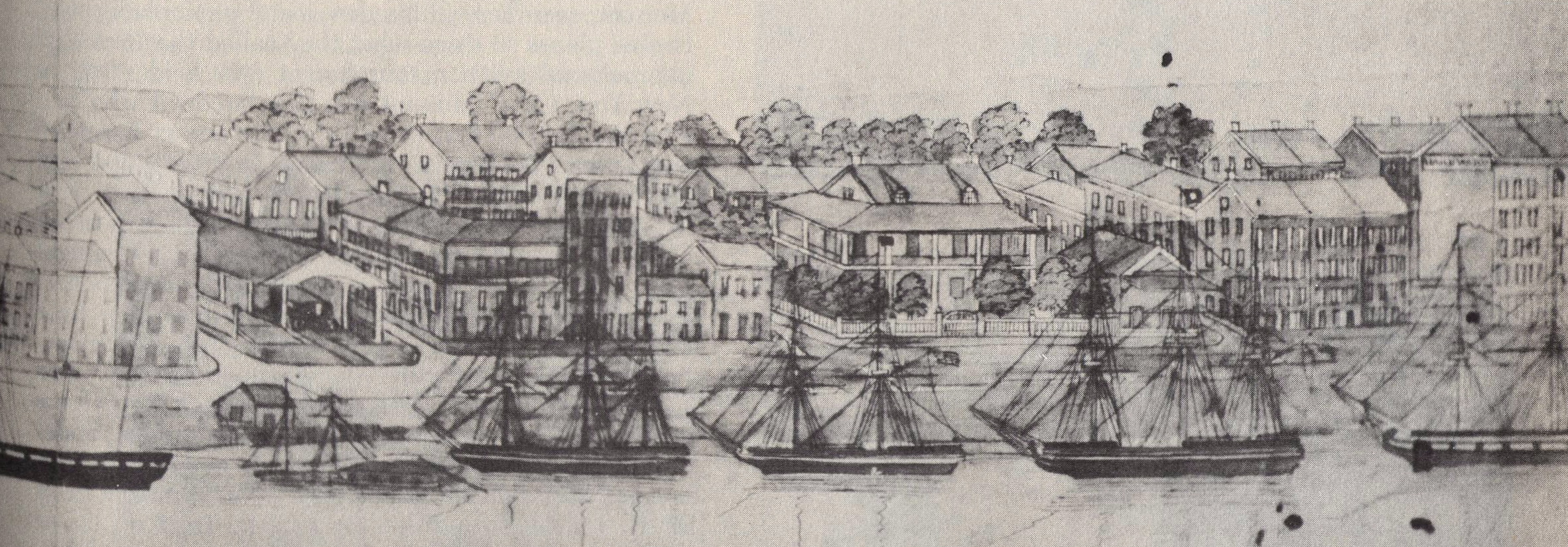
This 1836 sketch by G. W. Sully shows the riverfront terminal of the Pontchartrain Rail-Road on the left, at the head of Elysian Fields Avenue.

Pontchartrain Rail-Road was the first railway in New Orleans, Louisiana. Chartered in 1830, the railroad began carrying people and goods between the Mississippi River front and Lake Pontchartrain on April 23, 1831. It closed more than a hundred years later.

The 6-mile (10 km) long 4 ft 8 in (1,422 mm) gauge line connected the Faubourg Marigny neighborhood of New Orleans along the riverfront with the town of Milneburg on the Lakefront. When built, the majority of the distance of the route between neighborhoods at either end of the route was a mixture of farmland, woods, and swamp. The route of the railway ran down the center of Elysian Fields Avenue.

It was the third common carrier railroad to officially open for service to the public in the United States, following the Baltimore and Ohio and the South Carolina Canal and Rail Road Company.

== Early history ==
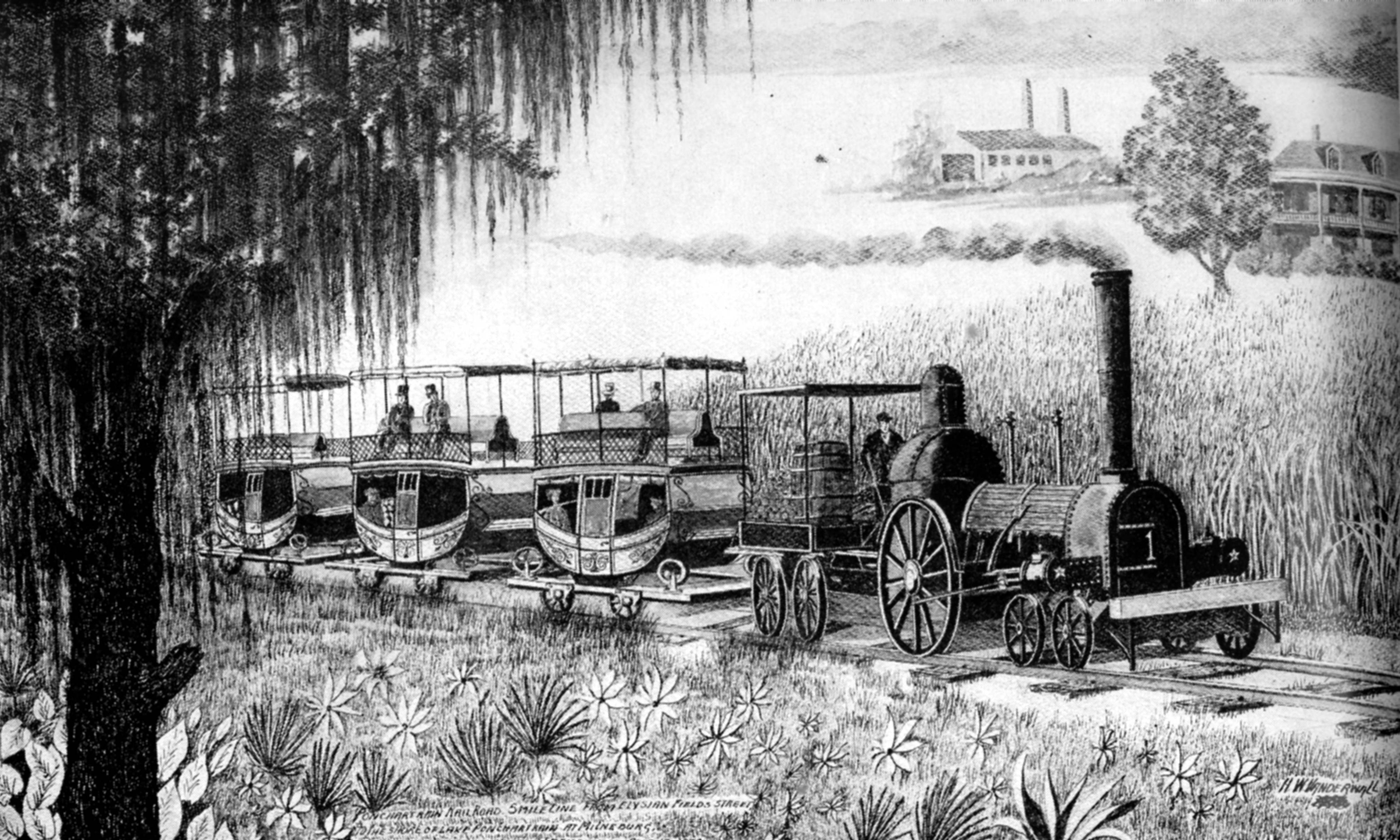
Pontchartrain Rail-Road in its early years, depicting a 4-2-0 locomotive and carriages, "Milneburg Train. Ponchartrain Railroad 5 mile line from Elysian Fields Street to the Shore of Lake Ponchartrain at Milneburg."

Meetings discussing building a railway between the river and lake began in 1828. The Pontchartrain Rail-Road was chartered on January 20, 1830. The right-of-way was approved by the New Orleans City Council on 15 March, and construction began immediately, with a pair of parallel railroad tracks. Some of the route included swampland that required up to 4 feet of fill to create a sufficient road bed. A 150 foot wide bed was constructed along the entire route, with the rail line laid with red cypress timbers and English rolled iron rails. Construction of the line was completed on April 14, 1831, and it officially opened on the 23rd, with horse drawn railway carriages. The first steam locomotive, "the Shields", arrived on June 15, 1832. This first locomotive proved unreliable; a second locomotive "the Pontchartrain" supplied from England by Rothwell, Hick & Co. proved better, allowing the line to advertise regular steam service of 7 round trips per day (9 on Sundays) starting on September 27, 1832. "The Shields" was cannibalized, the boiler used to run equipment at the railroad's machine shop.

At first, the passenger fare was 75 cents round trip. For some years both steam power and horse-drawn traffic ran on the line, with steam only gradually becoming dominant with the acquisition of more reliable locomotives. One horse-drawn car was kept on the line as late as 1861, although the line at the time also had five working locomotives.

For much of the 19th century, a significant portion of sea traffic to New Orleans came in not via the river but to Lake Pontchartrain. Thus the railway was important in transferring cargo between ocean-going ships docked at the lake and riverboats. Many passenger sea ships also arrived via the lake, and the railway took passengers the remainder of the way into the city.

For decades the passenger fare was 15 cents for a one way trip, 25 cents for a round trip. The railroad had terminals at the two ends of the line; stops would also be made at a small station at Gentilly Road, about the midpoint of the line, by advance request.

In 1871 the line was purchased by the New Orleans, Mobile and Texas Railroad.

In 1880 the Louisville and Nashville Railroad leased the line, and the following year purchased it outright.

The railway served passengers for the last time in 1932, with service from Milneburg to New Orleans replaced by buses.

== The line switches from shipping to recreation ==
In the late 19th century, the Pontchartrain Railroad became less important for commerce, as ships too large to use the Lakefront routes became common and the extensive network of long-distance railways grew. However, at the same time, the line became more important for recreation. Especially during the long summer, excursions from the city out to the lakefront became common, to enjoy the cooling breezes and the entertainments at Milneberg.

In the early 20th century rates were 10 cents for adults, 5 cents for children one way, and double for round trip.

Generations of New Orleanians fondly remembered the archaic veteran steam engine nicknamed "Smoky Mary" running on the line as late as the 1930s. The somewhat less outdated companion locomotive on the line was called "Puffing Billy".

== Final years ==
Thanks to the popularity of recreational excursions at Milneburg, business remained brisk for the Pontchartrain Railroad through the mid-1920s. After this, however, the railroad declined for two reasons. One was less demand for short-distance rail passenger service with expansion of electric streetcar routes and growth in automobile ownership. The final straw, however, was the closing of the Milneburg resorts while a land reclamation project dredged earth into the shallows of lake Pontchartrain there in the late 1920s and early 1930s. The last passenger service of the line was on March 15, 1932, the line having been in business for over a century.

Freight runs on the line continued to 1935, mostly servicing the Lakefront land reclamation project work which made the line obsolete.

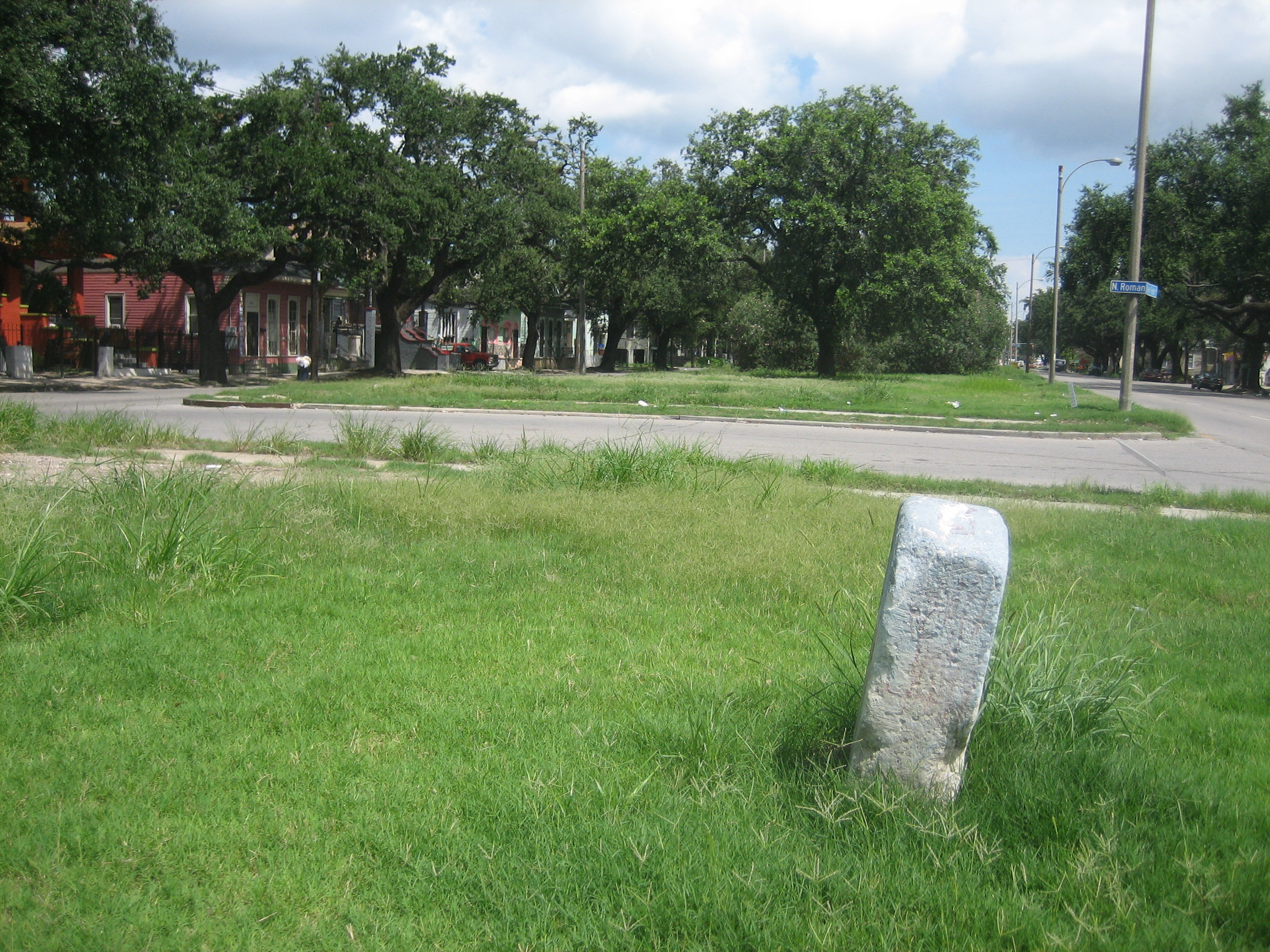
The Elysian Fields neutral ground, formerly the right-of-way of the Pontchartrain Rail-Road. The old mile-stone at the bottom right is one of the few surviving physical reminders of the long defunct railway.

== See also ==
- New Orleans and Carrollton Railroad
- 4 ft 8 in gauge railway
