= William Losh =

British chemist and industrialist (1770 – 1861)

William Losh (1770 in Carlisle – 4 August 1861, in Ellison Place, Newcastle) was a chemist and industrialist who is credited with introducing the Leblanc process for the manufacture of alkali to the United Kingdom.

== Life and work ==
Losh worked in a family business, Losh, Wilson and Bell, manufacturing chemicals in Walker-on-Tyne, near Newcastle upon Tyne, England. The firm manufactured akali and saltsake by processes patented by Archibald Cochrane. Losh went to Paris in 1802 where he learnt about the Leblanc process and then started to use it in his own factory.

Losh also became involved in the early development of the railways, when he collaborated with George Stephenson in the development of improved cast-iron rails that did not break as easily as existing rails. At the time, Losh had an ironworks in Walker, where the new rails could be manufactured. Subsequently, when Stephenson was building the Stockton and Darlington Railway, he decided to use wrought-iron rails obtained from the Bedlington Ironworks. This caused a permanent rift with William Losh, who had believed that he had an agreement with Stephenson to use his own rails.

Losh retired from the alkali business in 1831. In addition to being an alkali manufacturer he worked as a colliery agent and as consul for Prussia, the Scandinavian countries and, later, for Turkey.

== Bibliography ==
- Davies, Hunter (1975). George Stephenson. Weidenfeld and Nicolson. ISBN 0-297-76934-0.
- Hardie, David William Ferguson (1950). A History of the Chemical Industry of Widnes. London: Imperial Chemical Industries Limited, General Chemicals Division. ASIN B0007JBZRQ.
