= 4 ft 8 in gauge railways =

4 ft 8 in gauge railways are railways with a track gauge of 4 ft 8 in / 1,422 mm. This gauge is 1/2 inch (13 mm) less than 4 ft 8 1/2 in (1,435 mm) standard gauge, but is not considered narrow gauge despite the gauge. The first such railways were the Killingworth Railway and the Stockton and Darlington Railway (Note: Smiles (1904, p. 160) states that early tramroads had rails 4 ft 8 in (1,422 mm) apart, but Tomlinson (1915, pp. 82–83) challenges this, stating that the most common gauge of the early tramroads and waggonways was about 4 ft (1,219 mm), and some, such as the Wylam waggonway, had the rails 5 ft (1,524 mm) apart. The gauge of the S&DR was given in early documents as 4 ft 8 in (1,422 mm), but the distance between the rails was later measured as 4 ft 8 1/2 in (1,435 mm), and this became the standard gauge used by 60 per cent of railways worldwide. The difference of 1/2 inch (13 mm) is a mystery.)

== Similar gauges ==
- The Huddersfield Corporation Tramways, 4 ft 7 3/4 in (1,416 mm), the gauge is 3/4 inch (19 mm) less than 4 ft 8 1/2 in (1,435 mm)
- The Glasgow Corporation Tramways, 4 ft 7 3/4 in (1,416 mm)
- The Washington Metro 4 ft 8 1/4 in (1,429 mm), the gauge is 1/4 inch (6 mm) less than 4 ft 8 1/2 in (1,435 mm)
- The trams in Nuremberg for one time nominally used 1,432 mm (4 ft 8 3/8 in), the gauge is 1/8 inch (3 mm) less than 4 ft 8 1/2 in (1,435 mm)
- The MTR uses 1,432 mm (4 ft 8 3/8 in) on most lines.
- The Bucharest Metro uses 1,432 mm (4 ft 8 3/8 in)

== Railways ==
Country / territory	System / RR name	Notes
Netherlands	Trams in Amsterdam	In operation. Converted to 1,435 mm (4 ft 8 1/2 in) between 1900 and 1906
New Zealand	Trams in Dunedin	Defunct
UK	Clarence Railway	Became part of the North Eastern Railway in 1865
UK	Hetton colliery railway	Closed in 1959
UK	Killingworth Colliery railway Killingworth Railway; Killingworth tramway Killingworth wagonway	Four different names for the same line. Defunct
UK	Stockton and Darlington Railway	Became part of the North Eastern Railway in 1863
USA	Centreville Military Railroad	Defunct
USA	Green Mountain Cog Railway	
USA	Los Angeles and Independence Railroad	
USA	Manassas Gap Railroad	
USA	Montgomery and West Point Railroad	
USA	Mount Washington Cog Railway	In operation
USA	New Orleans and Carrollton Railroad	Became the St. Charles Streetcar Line, converted to 5 ft 2 1/2 in (1,588 mm)
USA	North Carolina Railroad	
USA	Pontchartrain Railroad	
USA	Raleigh and Gaston Railroad	
USA	Richmond, Petersburg and Carolina Railroad	
USA	Seaboard and Roanoke Railroad	
USA	West Feliciana Railroad	
USA	Western North Carolina Railroad	
USA	Wilmington and Weldon Railroad	

== See also ==
- 4 ft 7 3/4 in gauge
- List of 4 ft 8 in gauge railways
- List of track gauges
- List of tram track gauges

== Sources ==
- Allen, Cecil J. (1974) [1964]. The North Eastern Railway. Ian Allan. ISBN 0-7110-0495-1.
- Cook, Samantha (2005). New Orleans: Directions. Rough Guides. ISBN 1-84353-393-6.
- Smiles, Samuel (1904). Lives of the Engineers. The Locomotive. George and Robert Stephenson. John Murray. OCLC 220796785.
- Tomlinson, William Weaver (1915). The North Eastern Railway: Its rise and development. Andrew Reid and Company. OCLC 504251788.
