= Thomas Brandreth =

Thomas Brandreth may refer to:

- Thomas Shaw Brandreth (1788–1873), English inventor and classical scholar
- Thomas Brandreth (Royal Navy officer) (1825–1894), his son, Royal Navy admiral and Lord of the Admiralty
