= 1791 in literature =

This article contains information about the literary events and publications of 1791.

== Events ==
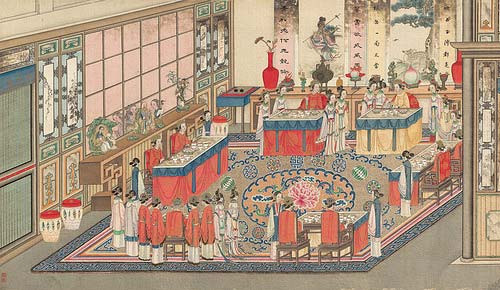
A piece from a series of brush paintings by the Qing dynasty artist Sun Wen (1818–1904), depicting a scene from the novel Dream of the Red Chamber.

- May 16 – James Boswell's Life of Samuel Johnson is published in 2 volumes in London on the 28th anniversary of their first meeting.
- September 10 – The Scottish poet and exciseman Robert Burns moves to Dumfries.
- unknown dates
  - Chinese writer and publisher Gao E and his partner Cheng Weiyan claim to have discovered Cao Xueqin's lost novel Dream of the Red Chamber.
  - The English poet Samuel Taylor Coleridge begins his course at Jesus College, Cambridge. He marks his transfer from Christ's Hospital school by composing the poem "On Quitting School".

== New books ==
=== Fiction ===
- Cao Xueqin (曹雪芹) and others – Dream of the Red Chamber (紅樓夢, first printed edition)
- Jean-Baptiste Louvet de Couvrai – Émilie de Varmont
- Elizabeth Inchbald – A Simple Story
- Ann Radcliffe – The Romance of the Forest
- Susanna Rowson – Charlotte, a Tale of Truth
- Marquis de Sade – Justine ou Les Malheurs de la vertu
- Charlotte Turner Smith – Celestina

=== Drama ===
- Antoine-Vincent Arnault – Marius à Minturne
- George Colman the Younger – The Surrender of Calais
- Hannah Cowley – A Day in Turkey
- Thomas Holcroft – The School for Arrogance
- Elizabeth Inchbald
  - Lovers' Vows
  - Next Door Neighbours
- John O'Keeffe – Wild Oats
- Frederick Reynolds – Notoriety

=== Poetry ===
- Robert Burns – "Tam o' Shanter"
- Erasmus Darwin – The Botanic Garden
- Christopher Smart – The Poems of the late Christopher Smart

=== Non-fiction ===
- James Boswell – Life of Samuel Johnson
- Olympe de Gouges – Declaration of the Rights of Woman and of the Female Citizen
- Isaac D'Israeli – Curiosities of Literature (Volume 1)
- Georg Forster – Views from the Lower Rhine (Volume 1)
- William Gilpin – Remarks on Forest Scenery and Other Woodland Views (3 volumes)
- Thomas Paine – Rights of Man (Part 1)
- Petrarch's View of Life (Latin dialogues De remediis utriusque fortunae translated by Susannah Dobson)
- Helen Maria Williams – Letters on the French Revolution

== Births ==
- January 15 – Franz Grillparzer, Austrian dramatist (died 1872)
- March 15 – Charles Knight, English publisher and author (died 1873)
- July 5 – Samuel Bailey, English philosopher and author (died 1870)
- August 17 – Richard Lalor Sheil, Irish politician, author and orator (died 1851)
- September 21 – István Széchenyi, Hungarian politician, writer and diarist (died 1860)
- October 26 – Charles Sprague, American poet and banker (died 1875)
- December 24 – Eugène Scribe, French dramatist (died 1861)

== Deaths ==
- January 11 – William Williams Pantycelyn, Welsh religious writer and hymnist (born 1717)
- March 2 – John Wesley, English preacher and religious writer (born 1703)
- April 2 – Honoré Gabriel Riqueti, comte de Mirabeau, French revolutionary and writer (born 1749)
- April 19 – Richard Price, Welsh moral philosopher and preacher (born 1723)
- June 12 – Francis Grose, English antiquary and lexicographer (born c. 1730)
- June 30 – Jean-Baptiste Descamps, French writer and painter (born 1714)
- July 1 - Charles O'Conor, Irish historian and antiquarian (born 1710)
- July 2 – Søren Abildgaard, Danish naturalist and writer (born 1718)
- November 22 – Johann Silberschlag, German theologian (born 1721)
