= Flying Dutchman (horse-powered locomotive) =

American horse-powered locomotive

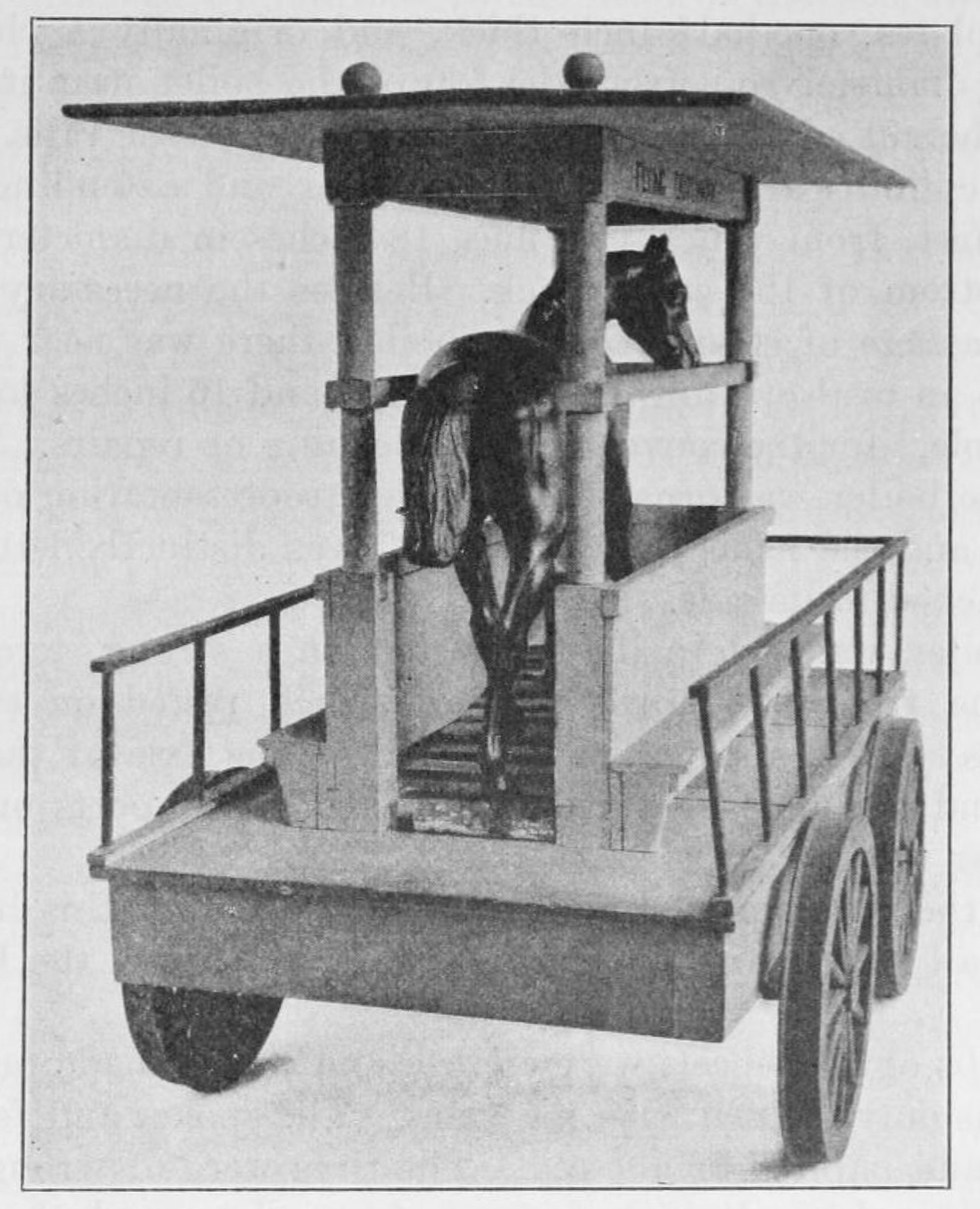
- Model from the collection of the Smithsonian Institution
Type and origin
- Power type: Horse
- Designer: Christian Edward Detmold
- Build date: 1829; 196 years ago
Specifications
Career
- Operators: South Carolina Canal and Railroad Company
- First run: 1830; 195 years ago
- Retired: 1830; 195 years ago

The Flying Dutchman was an American horse-powered locomotive operated by the South Carolina Canal and Railroad Company. It was built in New York by engineer Christian Edward Detmold and won an 1830 locomotive competition. Driven by a horse on a treadmill, it could carry 12 passengers at a speed of around 12 miles per hour (19 km/h). The South Carolina Canal and Railroad Company operated the Flying Dutchman on a 6-mile (9.7 km) stretch of track from early 1830. It was replaced by a steam-powered locomotive, the Best Friend of Charleston, by the end of the year.

== History ==
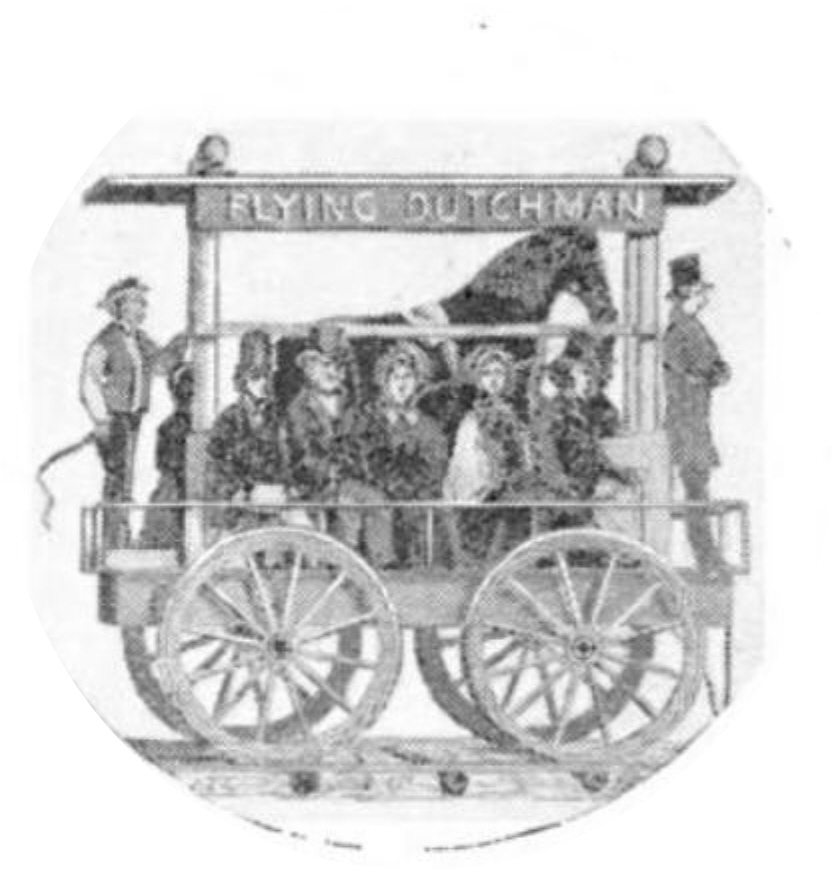
Depiction in Popular Mechanics, 1931

The recently founded South Carolina Canal and Railroad Company ran a competition for horse-powered locomotives in 1829. A$500 prize was offered for the best machine to be demonstrated. The Flying Dutchman was a locomotive designed and built in New York in 1829 by the engineer Christian Edward Detmold. It had a bench along either side that faced outwards, while the driving force was provided by a horse running on a treadmill in the center, connected to the axles by a series of gears. The Flying Dutchman was trialled by the railroad in 1830 and awarded the prize, having successfully carried 12 passengers at a speed of 12 miles per hour (19 km/h). The Flying Dutchman was in service on a 6-mile (9.7 km) section of the railroad, within months of the first section of track being started on January 9, 1830. A model of the Flying Dutchman is in the collection of the Smithsonian Institution.

== Replacement ==
Despite the victory of the Flying Dutchman, the railroad managers were persuaded by chief engineer Horatio Allen to transition to steam-powered locomotives. Allen was appointed to the role of chief engineer in September 1829 and in November presented a report on relative costs of horse and steam power. Allen had observed steam-powered locomotives in England and based his report on measurements taken at the Stockton and Darlington Railway, the world's first steam-powered public railway. On January 14, 1830, the directors of the South Carolina Canal and Railroad Company issued a resolution declaring that "the locomotive shall be alone used. The perfection of this power in its application to railroads is fast maturing and will certainly reach within the period of constructing our road a degree of excellence which will render the application of animal power a gross abuse of the gifts of genius and science". This was partly based on the expectation that there could be no great improvement in the breeding of horses but significant advances in steam locomotive technology were anticipated.

During 1830 the railroad also experimented with sail-powered cars. The first sail-powered vehicle ran on March 19, 1830, and carried 13–15 passengers at speeds of 10–15 miles per hour (16–24 km/h), though it also suffered an accident with its mast blown overboard. The first steam-powered locomotive to be built for public service in America, the Best Friend of Charleston, first ran on December 14, 1830. Capable of carrying 40–50 passengers at speeds of 30–35 miles per hour (48–56 km/h) it made its first excursion trip on January 15, 1831. Although the Best Friend of Charleston's career ended with a June 17, 1831, boiler explosion the railroad replaced it with another steam engine and never returned to horse-powered locomotives.

== Later horse-powered models ==
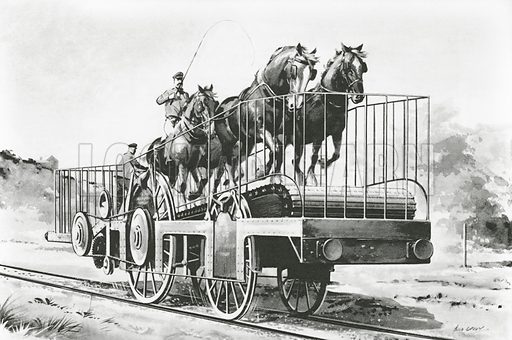
Masserano's Impulsoria of 1850

An Italian Professor of Philosophy, Dr Andrea Crestadoro, improved an existing design of the two or four horse-powered locomotive Impulsoria. Following his improvements Crestadoro exhibited it at The Great Exhibition held in the Crystal Palace in 1851. The final tale of horse-powered locomotives may be in Germany where an "Impulsoria" was exhibited in 1853.

== See also ==
- Cycloped, an English horse-powered locomotive that competed in the Rainhill Trials in October 1829.
