= Matthew Dobson =

English physician and physiologist (1732–1784)

Matthew Dobson (1732–1784) was an English physician and experimental physiologist. He is now remembered for his work on diabetes.

== Life and career ==
His parents were Joshua Dobson, a nonconformist minister at Lydgate, West Yorkshire, and Elizabeth, daughter of Matthew Smith who was minister at Mixenden. He matriculated at Glasgow University in 1750, where he graduated MA in 1753. He then moved to Edinburgh University, where he graduated MD in 1756. From the end of the decade he worked as a doctor in Liverpool.

Dobson worked with Matthew Turner and others to set up the Liverpool Academy of Art in 1769, a local reply to the Royal Academy's foundation in 1768. After a slow start, a first exhibition was held in 1774. (The 1810 foundation of the Liverpool Academy of Arts was in the nature of a fresh beginning.) In 1770, he was appointed physician to Liverpool Infirmary, as successor to John Kennion. He had a house in Harrington Street. When William Enfield wrote his History of Leverpool [sic] (1772), Dobson contributed to it.

About 1776 Dobson gave up his Liverpool practice, which was taken over by Joseph Brandreth. He was elected a Fellow of the Royal Society in 1778, and became head of the Liverpool Medical Library in 1779. In 1780, suffering from poor health, he retired to Bath, Somerset. He joined the Manchester Literary and Philosophical Society, established in 1781.

Dobson was physician, and eventually confidant to Hester Thrale. He played a key role in her second marriage to Gabriel Piozzi, persuading her daughter Queeney to accept Piozzi, whose banishment from the household he said was life-threatening for her mother.

Dobson died in Bath on 25 July 1784, incidentally on the day of Hester Thrale's second marriage, and was buried at Walcot. A memorial was put up in Toxteth Park chapel.

== Study group ==
Dobson was part of a medical study group for his local area that met on a quarterly basis. John Aikin of Chester and Warrington took part, with John Bostock, Thomas Percival and John Haygarth. Dobson provided information on influenza in Liverpool for the researches of Haygarth, a classmate from Edinburgh.

This group was closely associated with Joseph Priestley, Richard Price and radical politics. It also cooperated as part of Priestley's attempt to develop "pneumatic therapy": the medical use of newly isolated gases.

== Medical work ==
In his student days, Dobson worked with William Cullen at Glasgow University on evaporation. In 1775, Dobson for the first time identified as a sugar the sweet substance in the urine of patients with diabetes. He published his work as Experiments and Observations on the Urine in Diabetics (1776). It did not have a major clinical impact, the findings being still debated until the work of George Owen Rees in the middle of the 19th century. Dobson observed the sweet taste of the blood of diabetics (caused by hyperglycemia), and argued that the disease was not located in the kidneys, as was believed at the time. Initial use of specialised diets by physicians was not very successful. John Rollo cited Dobson in his research of the late 1790s, and established principles for a diabetic diet.

In 1775, Dobson experimented with a heated room as treatment, a line of research already explored by George Fordyce and Charles Blagden. His colleague Henry Park acted as guinea pig. He published the results as a letter to John Fothergill in Philosophical Transactions.

In 1779, Dobson reported success in using "fixed air" (carbon dioxide) in the treatment of scurvy. That year he published Medical Commentary on Fixed Air. The 1787 edition had an appendix by William Falconer. The work also advocated fixed air as a treatment for the stone. Dobson was interested in bladder stones from a statistical point of view, too, and gathered data from Norwich Hospital. In fact he made a wider survey of hospitals and their admissions in the 1779 edition, Norwich having the highest proportion of admitted patients for bladder stone. The figures were reprinted by Leonhard Ludwig Finke during the 1790s.

== Family ==
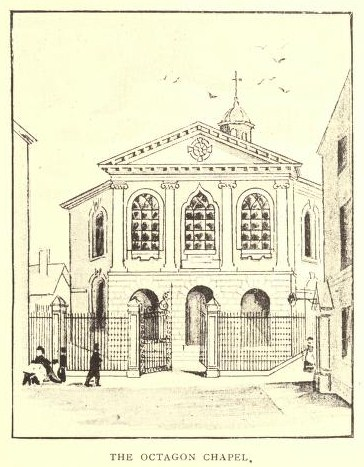
The Octagon Chapel, Liverpool, pen-and-ink sketch

In 1759, Dobson married Susannah Dobson (née Dawson), a translator from French. They had three children, at least two of whom were baptised at the Octagon Chapel, Liverpool. Dobson was an associate of Thomas Bentley in the construction of the chapel; and Nicholas Clayton, a classmate from Glasgow, was the first minister.
