= Impulsoria =

Horse-powered locomotive of 1850s Britain

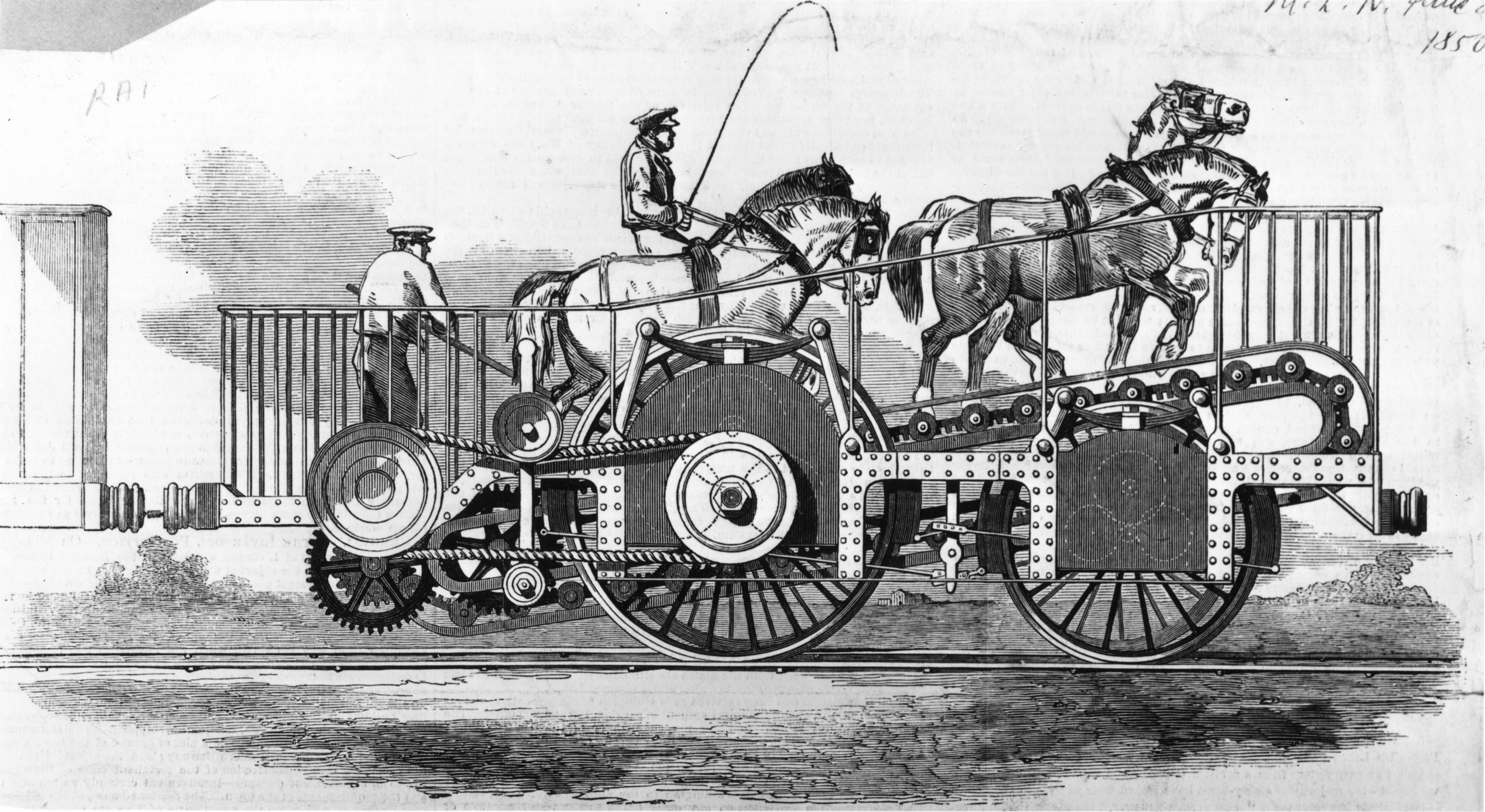
- Impulsoria in 1850
Type and origin
- Power type: Horse
- Designer: Clemente Masserano
- Build date: 1850
Specifications
- Configuration
  - Whyte: 2-2-0
- Driver dia.: 8 ft (2.4 m)
Performance figures
- Maximum speed: 20 mph (32 km/h)
- Power output: 2-4 bhp (in steady state)
Career
- Operators: London and South Western Railway

The Impulsoria was a locomotive constructed in 1850 that was powered via a gearbox by one-two to four horses on a treadmill following a design by Clemente Masserano. It undertook trials in London in 1850 and was exhibited at The Great Exhibition in 1851.

== Description ==
The invention of a successful mobile treadmill powered locomotive was made by Clemente Masserano from Pignerol in Italy. The idea was not new, but previous attempts in England, France, and Spain were unsuccessful. Using Masserano's designs, Impulsoria was built in Italy and transported to England. A syndicate was formed and it was trialled at the Nine Elms terminus of the South Western Railway line in London where it successfully completed a hill climb. The trials were supported by the directors of the South Western Railway and assisted by their Chief Engineer John Gooch. The device was said to be much cheaper to run than a steam locomotive. The device allowed a steam locomotive to be replaced by this vehicle, which used the power of two or four horses that had to walk up a treadmill, called a pedivella by Masserano. The power was transferred to the wheels by chains and notably the wheels had roller-bearings and a gearbox that allowed it to climb. It was said to be able to pull 30 wagons up an incline and could be used with two or four horses.

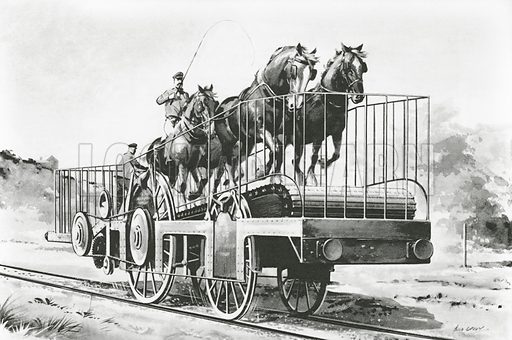
A sketch of Masserano's Impulsoria

The gear box allowed the horses to always walk at their best speed whilst the vehicle could then have a range of speeds and torques. Because of the gears, the top speed was not limited to the top speed of the horses. The gearbox allowed the horses to drive the vehicle in forward as well as reverse directions, and it was also possible to disengage the drive so that the vehicle could stop whilst the horses continued to walk up the treadmill.

During trials at Nine-Elms terminus of the South Western Railway, the two-horse Impulsoria travelled at 7 mph (11 km/h) pulling one wagon within the station. It was thought that a final version would reach 15 to 20 mph (24 to 32 km/h) and would outrun a steam engine.

== Cost and efficiency ==
The efficiency of the device was compared favourably with existing steam locomotives, which were thought to waste too much energy. The cost of operating the Impulsoria was estimated at two shillings per day per horse. During that eight-hour day it was estimated that the horses could propel Impulsoria eight times over a thirty-mile route.

== Exhibition ==
An Italian Professor of Philosophy, Dr Andrea Crestadoro, improved the design of this unusual device, and later took out related patents in 1852. With his improvements, he exhibited it at The Great Exhibition at the Crystal Palace in 1851. He subsequently took an interest in bibliography and became a librarian in Manchester. A similar vehicle, also called Impulsoria, was exhibited in 1853 in Germany and said to be the property of a Mr. Steinheil.

== See also ==
- Cycloped, an English horse-powered locomotive that competed in the Rainhill trials in October 1829.
- Flying Dutchman, an 1830 American horse-powered locomotive.
