= Cycloped =

Early locomotive powered by a horse

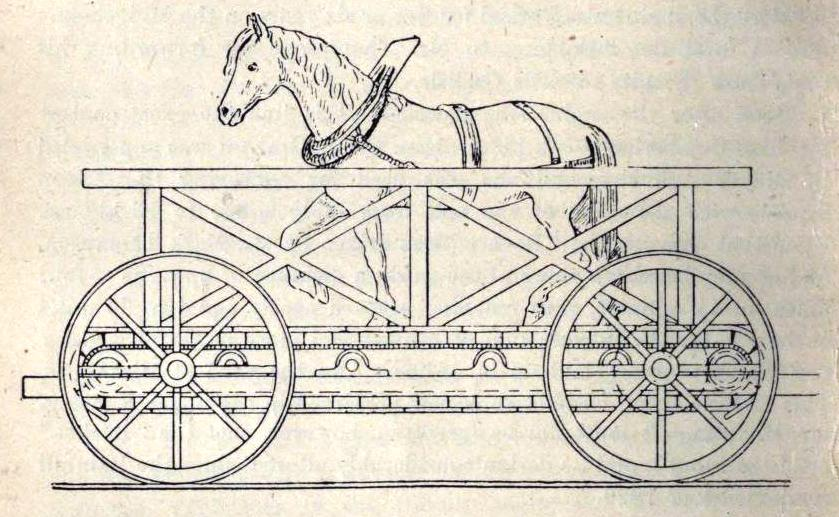
- Contemporary drawing of Cycloped
Type and origin
- Power type: Horse
- Builder: Thomas Shaw Brandreth of Liverpool
Specifications

Cycloped was an early horse-powered locomotive, built by Thomas Shaw Brandreth of Liverpool, which competed unsuccessfully in the Rainhill trials of October 1829.

== The Rainhill trials ==
The Cycloped was the only entry in the trials that did not rely on steam power, instead utilising a treadmill that was kept continually moving by a horse mounted on top.

Brandreth was one of the directors of the railway and some people believed that that gave the Cycloped an unfair advantage. But the Cycloped was an impractical idea and because of its failure to generate enough speed to equal its competitors—Burstall's Perseverance, Braithwaite's Novelty, Hackworth's Sans Pareil and Stephenson's Rocket—it ultimately lost the competition in the trials. Stephenson's Rocket eventually won the trials, maintaining an average speed of 13.8 mph (22.2 km/h) for a modest consumption of coal and water.

== Dandy wagons ==
Horses had been used to pull wagons on coal and mineral tramways and plateways for some years before this. Many of these tramways and plateways were arranged so that the line ran downhill from the mine to a river or coastal port. Loaded trains would descend under the power of gravity, with horses used to haul the empty trains back uphill.

Early examples with just one or two wagons together were pulled downhill by the horse, the horse also acting as brakes. Once improved mechanical brakes were available, longer trains of wagons could be controlled during their descent. The horses were carried downhill in a special dandy wagon, usually attached to the end of the run of loaded wagons. These dandy wagons were simple unpowered wagons, often with no more adaptation for horses than special doors to load and unload the animals.

== Other horse locomotives ==
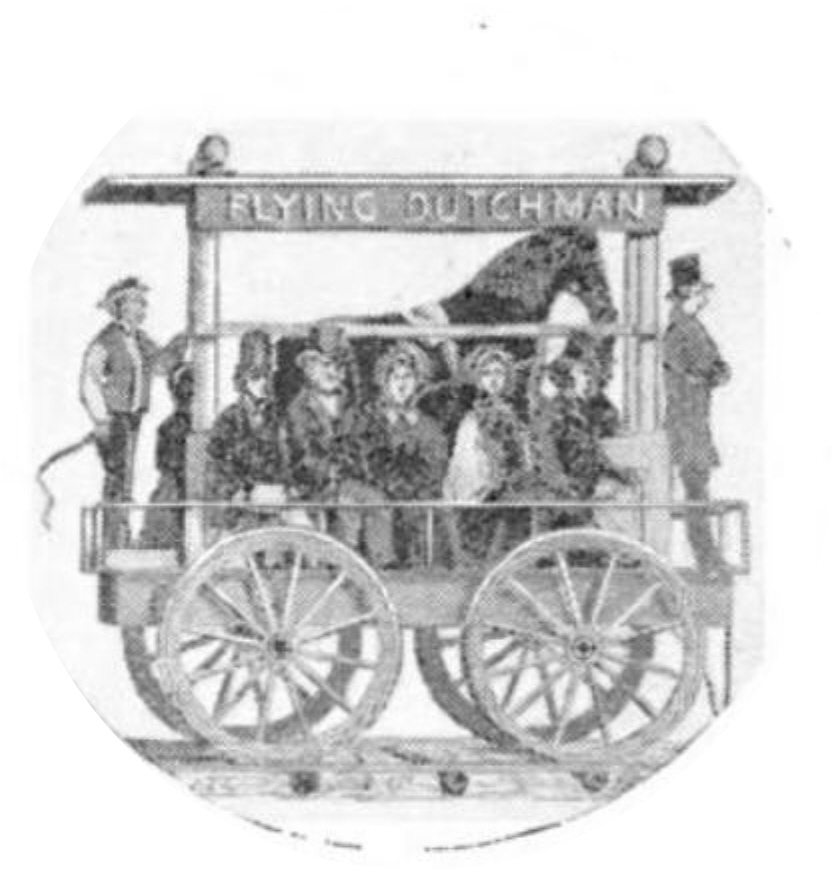
Flying Dutchman of the South Carolina Canal and Railroad Company, 1829

Horse locomotives were only used for a brief period between the development of passenger-carrying public railways and the provision of viable steam locomotives. Other horse-powered locomotives include the Flying Dutchman of the South Carolina Canal and Railroad Company, used briefly in 1830, and the Impulsoria, exhibited at the Great Exhibition in 1851.
