= The Alchemist Discovering Phosphorus =

Painting by Joseph Wright of Derby

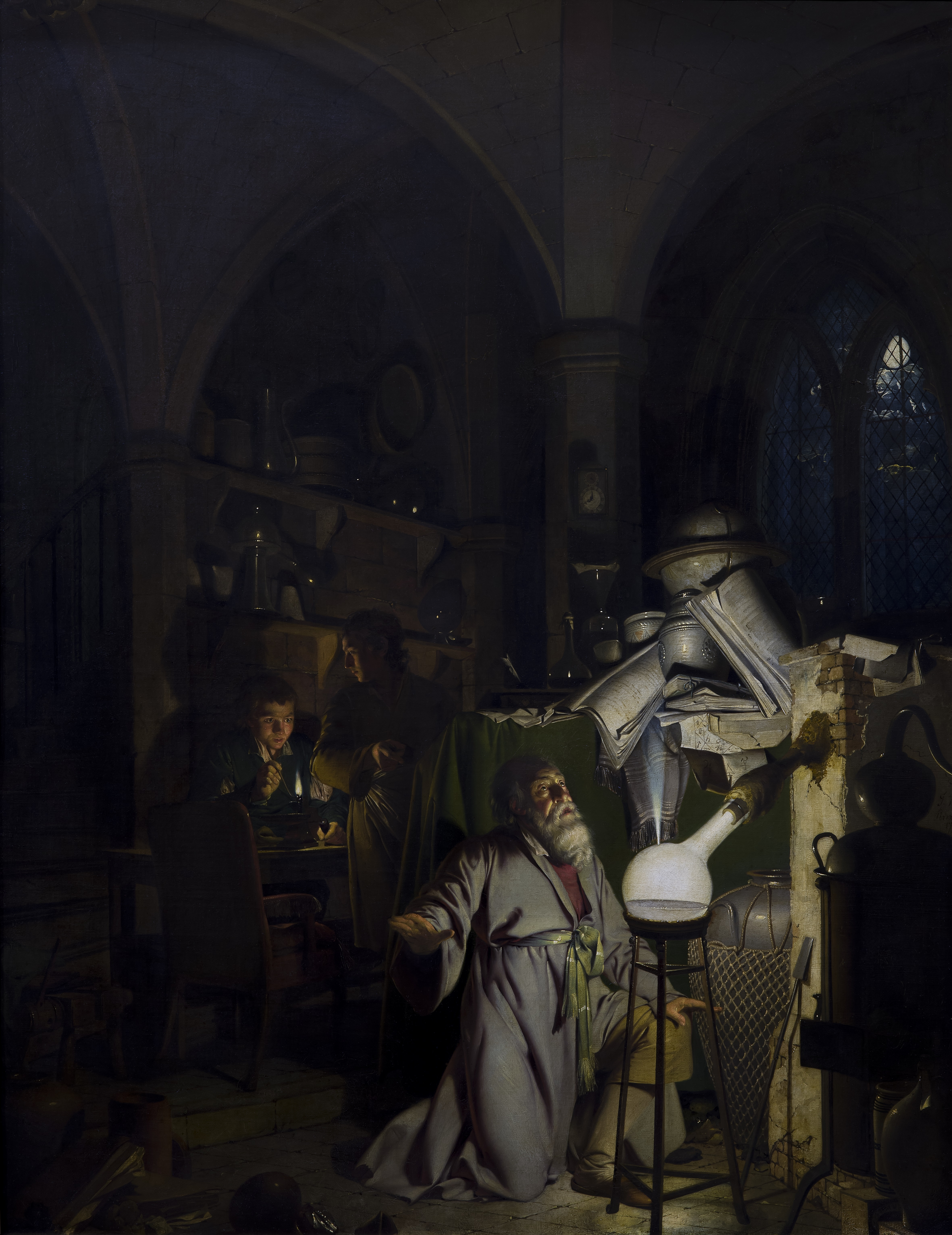
- Artist: Joseph Wright of Derby
- Year: 1771
- Dimensions: 127 cm × 101.6 cm (50 in × 40.0 in)
- Location: Derby Museum and Art Gallery, Derby

The Alchemist Discovering Phosphorus is a painting by Joseph Wright of Derby originally completed in 1771 then reworked in 1795. The full title of the painting is The Alchymist, in Search of the Philosopher's Stone, Discovers Phosphorus, and prays for the successful Conclusion of his operation, as was the custom of the Ancient Chymical Astrologers. It has been suggested that The Alchymist refers to the discovery of phosphorus by the Hamburg alchemist Hennig Brand in 1669. This story was often printed in popular chemical books in Wright's lifetime, and was widely known.

== Description ==
The picture shows the alchemist trying to produce the elusive Philosopher's stone, which could turn ordinary metal into gold, but instead, to his amazement, he discovers phosphorus. However, Wright does not picture the alchemist in a 17th-century background, but he romanticises the room by imagining medieval gothic arches and high, pointed windows as if he is in a church. He also gave a very favourable impression of the actual process, which involves the reduction by boiling of urine. A 1730 description of the manufacture of phosphorus described the need for 50 or 60 pails of urine that was both putrid and "bred worms".

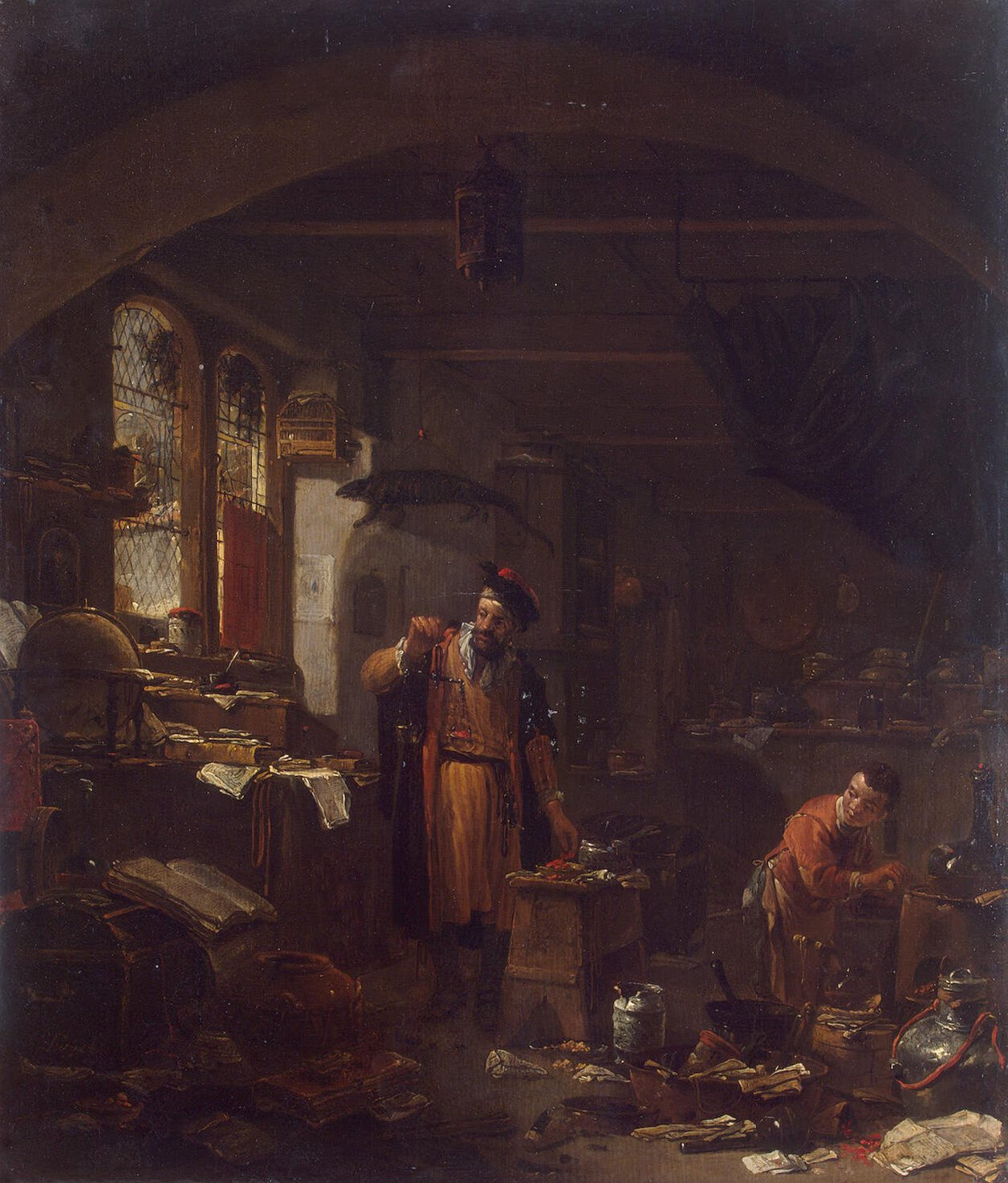
The Alchemist by Thomas Wijck

Wright also gives religious connotations to the painting. The alchemist kneels in front of a shining vessel, stretching out his hands in a similar gesture to that used by El Greco when painting St Francis receiving the Stigmata or St Jerome in Prayer. Benedict Nicolson compares his posture to that of one of Christ's disciples receiving communion. He believes that the layout of the painting may have been taken from Thomas Wijck's painting (left) of an alchemist, which also contains similar vaulting, a confusion of objects and a similar assistant who is singled out by the light. This painting from the previous century was on display in London during Wright's lifetime. However, it is clear from a sketch by Wright's companion, Peter Perez Burdett, that he had a strong influence on the design. His sketch of 4 February 1771 shows the vaulting and the layout of the painting, with the glass container as its focus. It is Burdett who says where to place the figure in the painting, and Burdett had already referred Wright to Matthew Turner so that Wright might fully understand the underlying science in the painting.

== History ==
Since its exhibition in 1771, the picture has provoked many contradictory interpretations. Its mystery disturbed 18th-century viewers, and although Wright was an internationally recognised artist, the painting was not sold when he first exhibited it. The picture travelled with Wright to Italy in 1773–1775, came back to England, was reworked in 1795, but was only sold four years after his death, when his possessions were auctioned at Christie's.The painting was reproduced as a mezzotint by William Pether, published in London on 1 September 1775.
