= Thomas Twyne =

Thomas Twyne (1543 – 1 August 1613 Lewes) was an Elizabethan translator and a physician of Lewes in Sussex, best known for completing Thomas Phaer's translation of Virgil's Aeneid into English verse after Phaer's death in 1560, and for his 1579 English translation of De remediis utriusque fortunae, a collection of 253 Latin dialogues written by the humanist Francesco Petrarca (1304–1374), commonly known as Petrarch.

Thomas was the son of John Twyne (c.1500–1581) of Bullington, Hampshire, himself a translator, schoolmaster, noted collector of antiquarian manuscripts and author of the Commentary De Rebus Albionicis (London, 1590). Tywne's son, Brian Twyne, became the first Keeper of the Archives of the University of Oxford.

Thomas was a native of Canterbury and was educated at Corpus Christi College, Oxford. He acted in the Richard Edwardes version of Palamon and Arcite, put on before Elizabeth I at Oxford in 1566, on which occasion the stage collapsed, killing and injuring a number of people. He enjoyed the patronage of Lord Buckhurst and greatly admired John Dee and his mystic philosophy.

== Epitaph ==
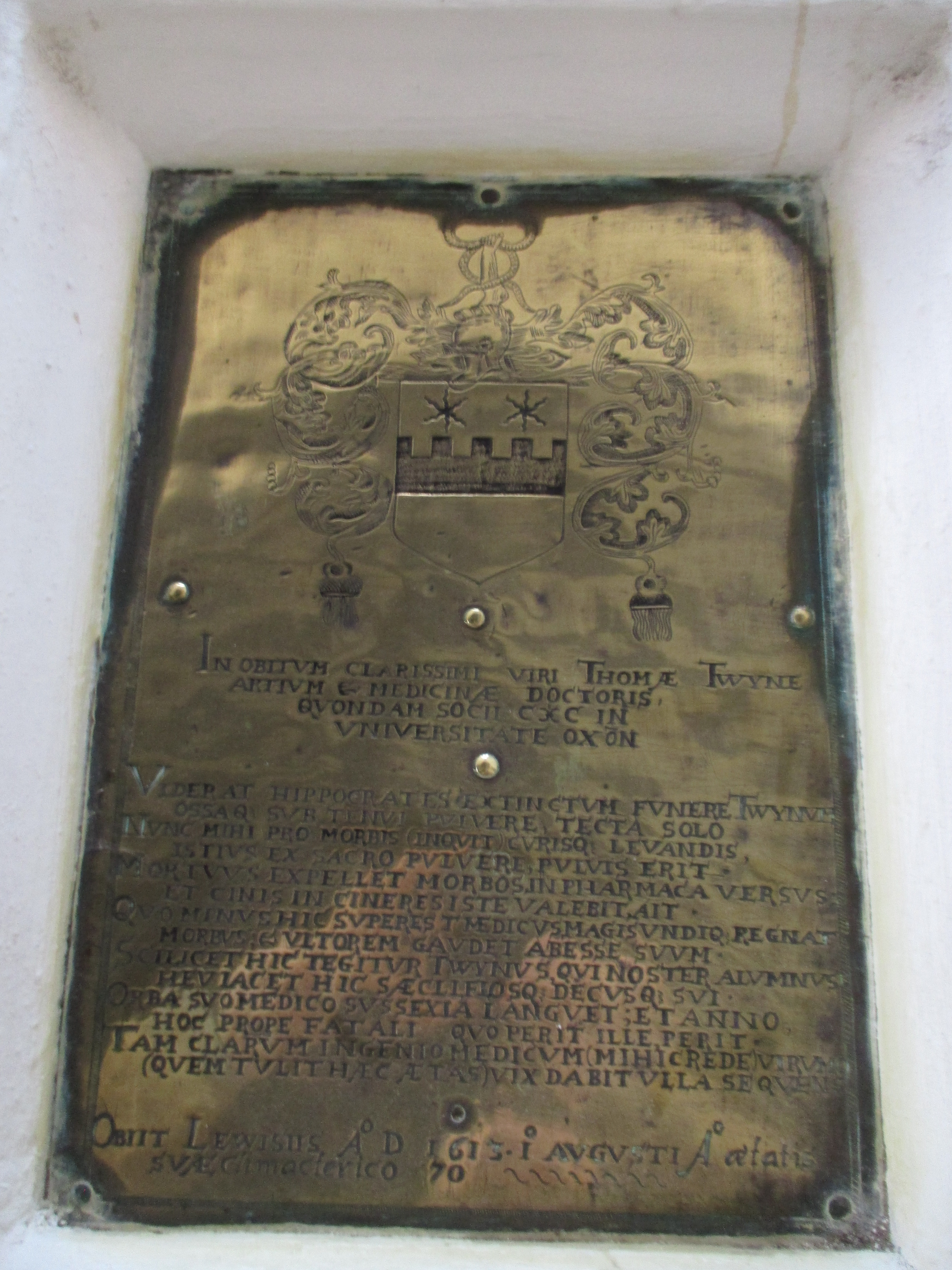
The memorial tablet to Thomas Twyne in St Anne's Church, Lewes

In St. Anne's Church on the hill at Lewes. The historian Thomas Walker Horsfield, F.S.A. (1792–1837) translated the rather florid Latin inscription:

Hippocrates saw Twyne lifeless and his bones slightly covered with earth. Some of his sacred dust (says he) will be of use to me in removing diseases; for the dead, when converted into medicine, will expel human maladies, and ashes prevail against ashes. Now the physician is absent, disease extends itself on every side, and exults its enemy is no more. Alas! here lies our preserver Twyne; the flower and ornament of his age. Sussex deprived of her physician, languished, and is ready to sink along with him. Believe me, no future age will produce so good a physician and so renowned a man as this has. He died at Lewes in 1613, on 1 August, in the tenth climacteric.

A modern edition of forty-six of Petrarch's dialogues, Phisicke Against Fortune, was published in 1993.

== Books ==
- Humphrey Lloyd (Llwyd, Lhuyd), Humphrey (1527–1568), Commentarioli Descriptionis Britannicae Fragmentum (Cologne, 1572), translated into English by Thomas Twyne as The Breviary of Britayne (London, 1573)
- Pierre Drouet's work translated by Thomas Twyne as A new counsell against the plague (1578)
- Maffeo Vegio, Supplement to the Twelfth Book of the Aeneid as translated by Thomas Twyne, 1584
