= Thomas Brandreth (Royal Navy officer) =

Royal Navy Admiral (1825–1894)

Admiral Sir Thomas Brandreth KCB
- Born: 6 August 1825
- Died: 10 December 1894 (aged 69)
- Spouse: Madeline Colvin (m. 1866)
- Military career
- Allegiance: United Kingdom
- Branch: Royal Navy
- Rank: Admiral
- Commands: Royal Naval College, Greenwich
- Awards: KCB

Admiral Sir Thomas Brandreth KCB (6 August 1825 – 10 December 1894), was a Royal Navy officer and instructor, who served as Third Naval Lord and Controller of the Navy from 1882 until 1885.

== Early life ==
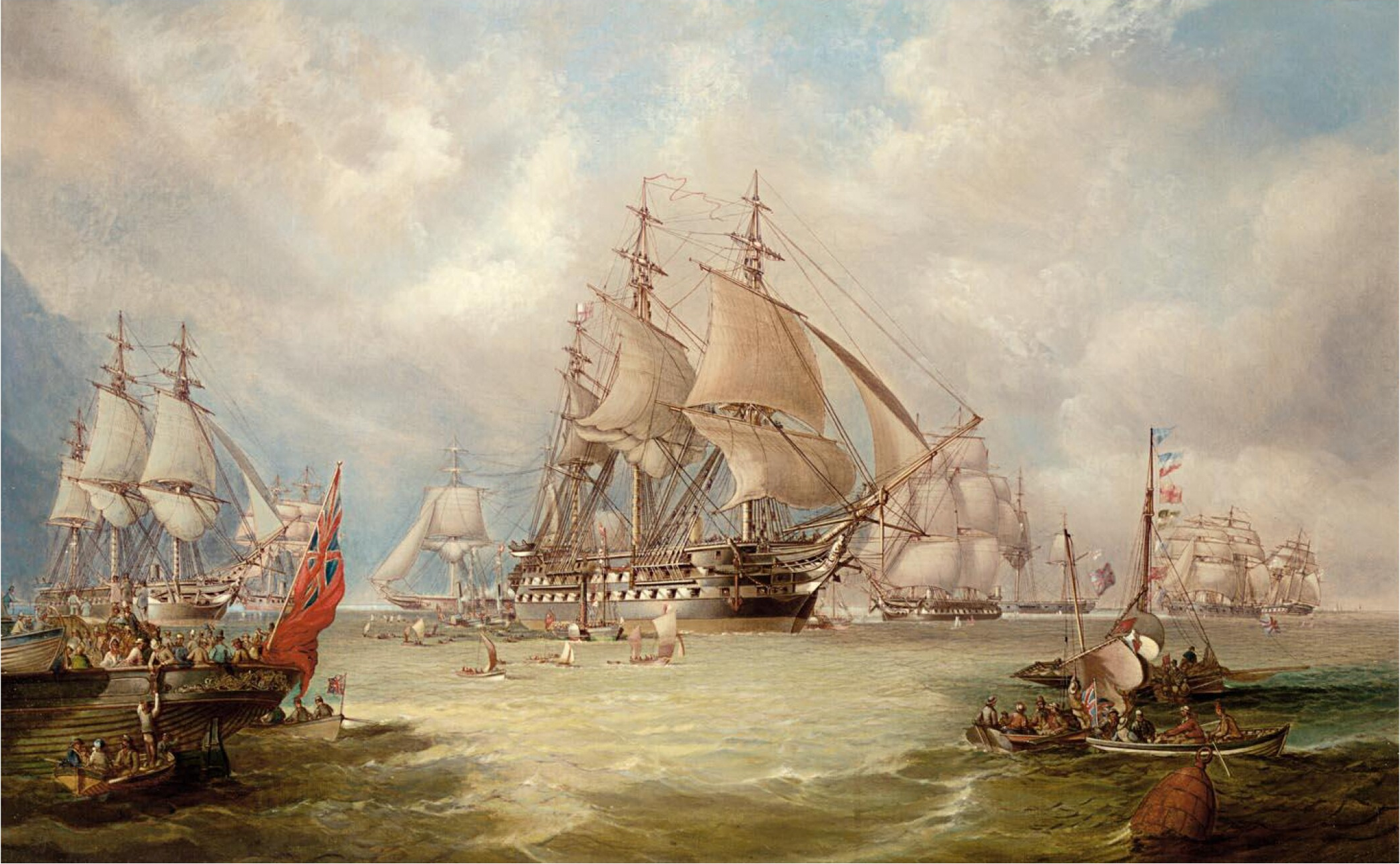
Brandreth commanding HMS Edgar in 1865

Descended from Cheshire gentry, he was a grandson of Dr Joseph Brandreth and like his father educated at Eton College, before being commissioned into the Royal Navy in 1838.

== Naval career ==
Appointed Lieutenant in 1845, Brandreth served in the Crimean War being promoted in 1863 Captain in command of HMS Edgar then in 1869 of HMS Lord Warden. Captain of HMS Excellent Gunnery Training School from 1874, promoted Captain-Superintendent of Sheerness Dockyard in 1877 and Admiral-Superintendent of Chatham Dockyard in 1879, Brandreth was appointed as Third Naval Lord and Controller of the Navy in 1881.

Admiral Brandreth served from 1885 until 1888 as President of the Royal Naval College, Greenwich, before retiring in 1890.

== Family ==
The son of Thomas Shaw Brandreth FRS and Harriet Byrom, his brother-in-law was Dr James Alexander Gordon and among his cousins was Benjamin Brandreth.

He married in 1866 Madeline Colvin (1843–1916), daughter of Alexander Colvin, an East India merchant, and had issue:

- Colvin Brandreth (1867–1913), who married 1903 Edith Tarleton (1866–1951), daughter of Admiral Sir John Tarleton, leaving issue:
  (a son Commander Thomas Brandreth (1910–1980) and a daughter Mrs Finetta Chamberlain (1907–2004).

Military offices
Preceded by Sir William Stewart	Third Naval Lord and Controller of the Navy; 1881–1885	Succeeded by Sir William Graham
Preceded by Sir William Luard	President, Royal Naval College, Greenwich; 1885–1888	Succeeded by Sir William Graham
