= Thomas Wijck =

Dutch painter

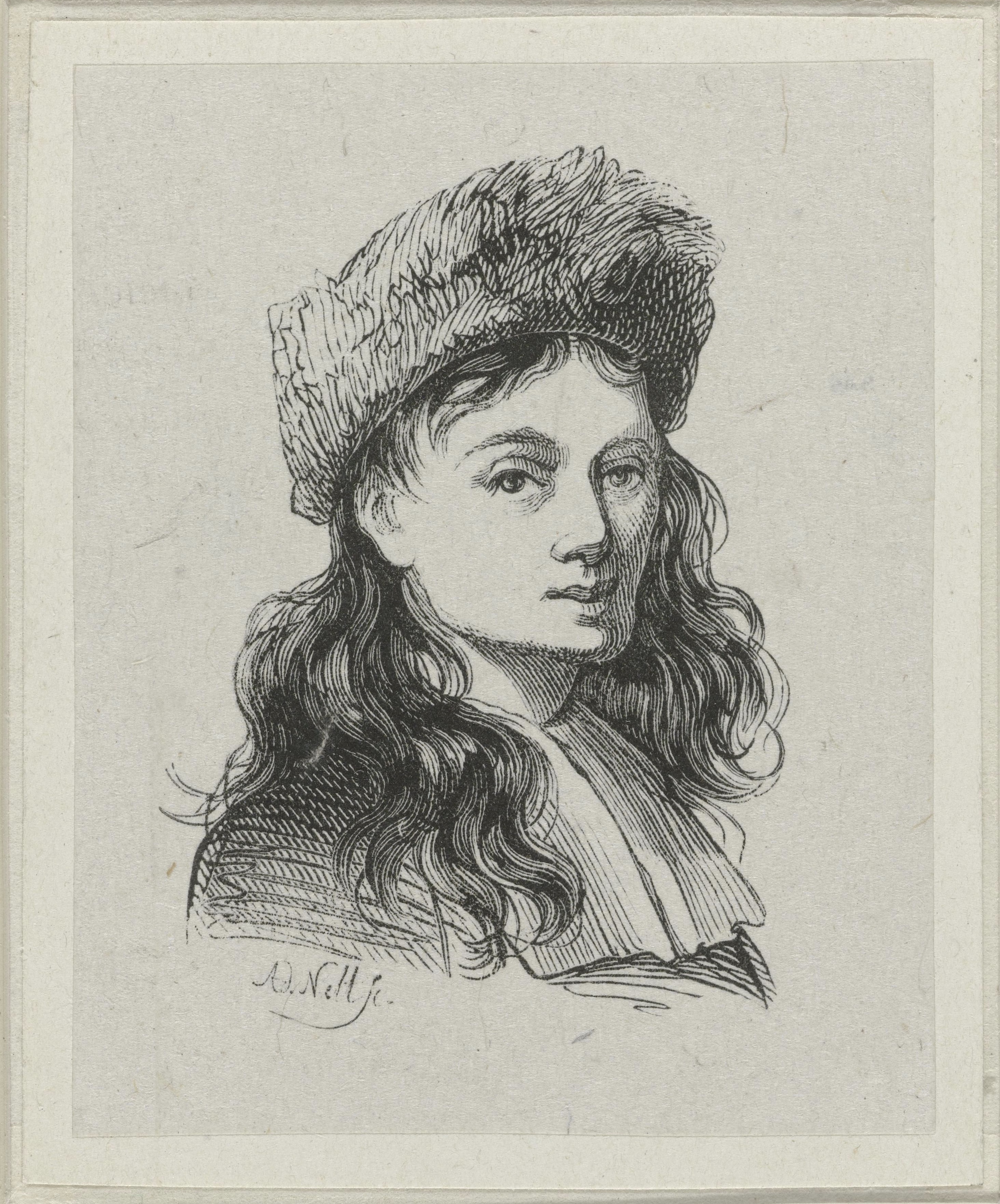
- 19th century portrait of Thomas Wijck by Adolphe Frédéric Nett
- Born: 1616; Beverwijk, Dutch Republic
- Died: 1677 (aged 60–61); Haarlem, Dutch Republic
- Known for: Painting
- Movement: Dutch Golden Age painting

Thomas Wijck (also Thomas Wijk, or Thomas Wyck; 1616–1677) was a Dutch painter of port views and genre paintings.

== Biography ==
Wijck was born into an artist family and received his training from his father. He journeyed to Italy, presumably by 1640, the year in which a ‘Tommaso fiammingo, pittore’ (Thomas the Fleming, painter) is documented as residing in Rome in the Via della Fontanella. Although this evidence of his residence in Rome around this time has been questioned, a number of his pictures depict scenes in and around Rome which would indicate a visit to the city at some point. He also resided in the environs of Naples, where he executed many sketches which he subsequently worked up into drawings of coast views.

In 1642 Wijck returned to the northern Netherlands, where he became a member of the Haarlem Guild of St. Luke. In 1660 he was appointed Dean of the Haarlem Guild.

He went to England about the time of the Restoration and was much employed. He was followed there by his son and pupil Jan Wyck, who remained in Britain for the rest of his career and played an important role in the development of English sporting painting. Thomas Wyck was also the teacher of the Haarlem painter Jan van der Vaart, who later also immigrated to England.

He died in Haarlem in August 1677. Pieter Mulier II was a follower of his style.

== Work ==
He excelled in Italianate paintings of shipping and seaports, populated with many figures, very frequently odd characters such as alchemists and misers. His style resembles that of the loose group of Dutch and Flemish genre painters working in Rome who are called the 'Bamboccianti' and were influenced by the genre paintings of Pieter van Laar. He also painted fairs, public markets, and the interiors of chemists’ laboratories.

Thomas Wijck's painting of an alchemist is said to have influenced Joseph Wright of Derby's similar picture. Both pictures contain similar vaulting, a confusion of objects and an assistant who is singled out by the light.

Thomas Wijck painted a View of London before the fire, and another of the north bank of the Thames, from Southwark, exhibiting the mansions of the nobility in the Strand. He also painted the “Fire of London” more than once.

== Gallery ==
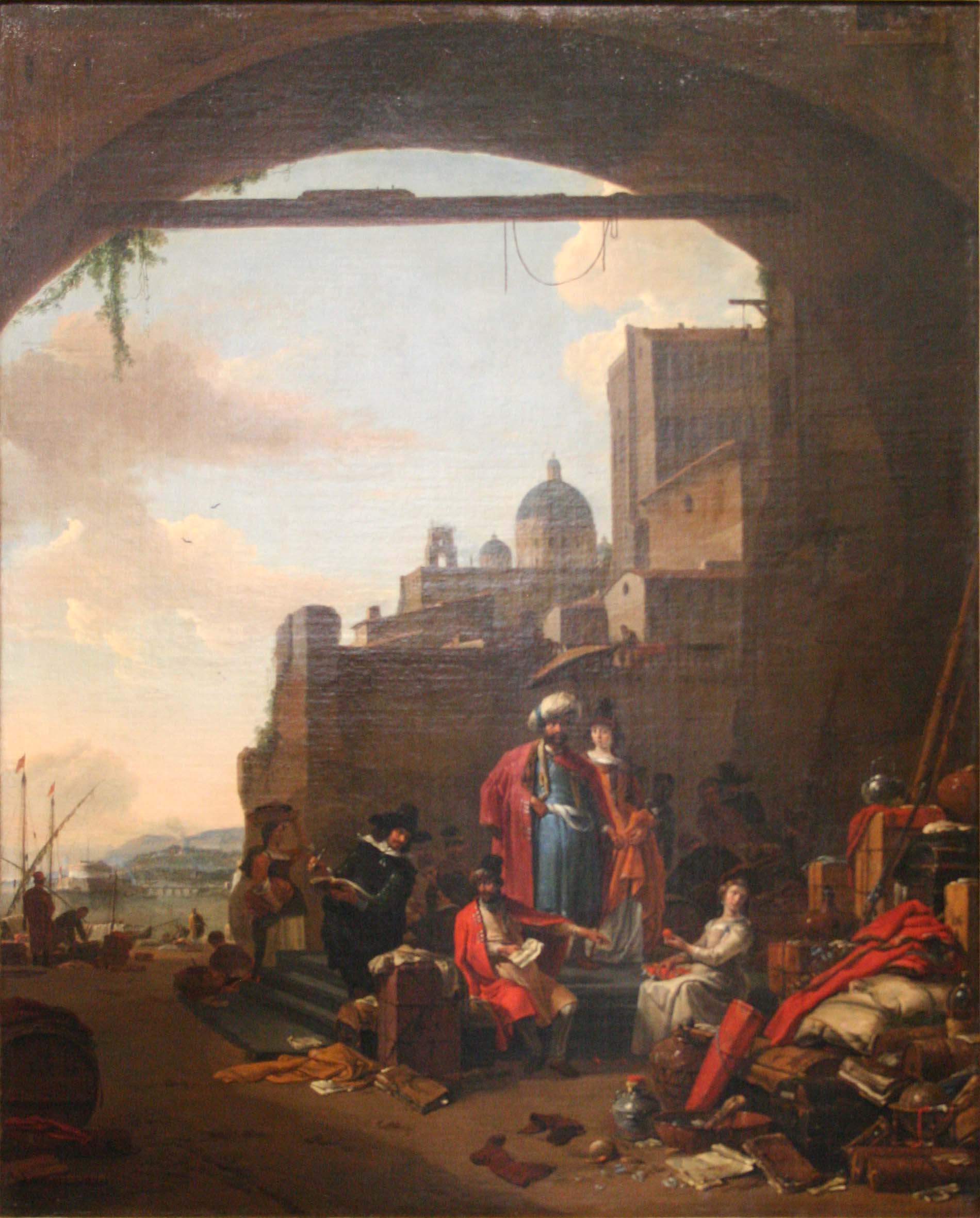
The corsair and the Jew

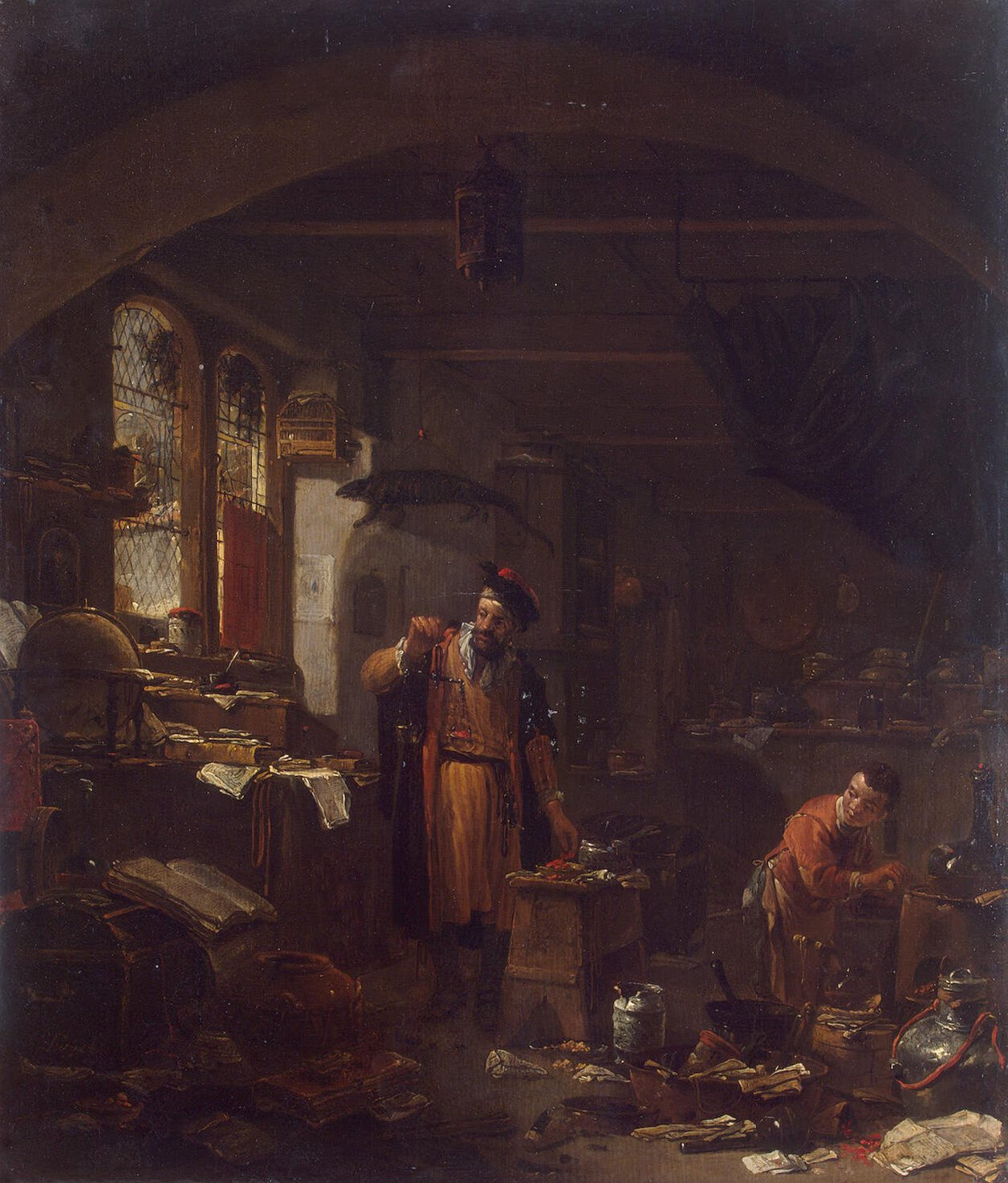
The Alchemist

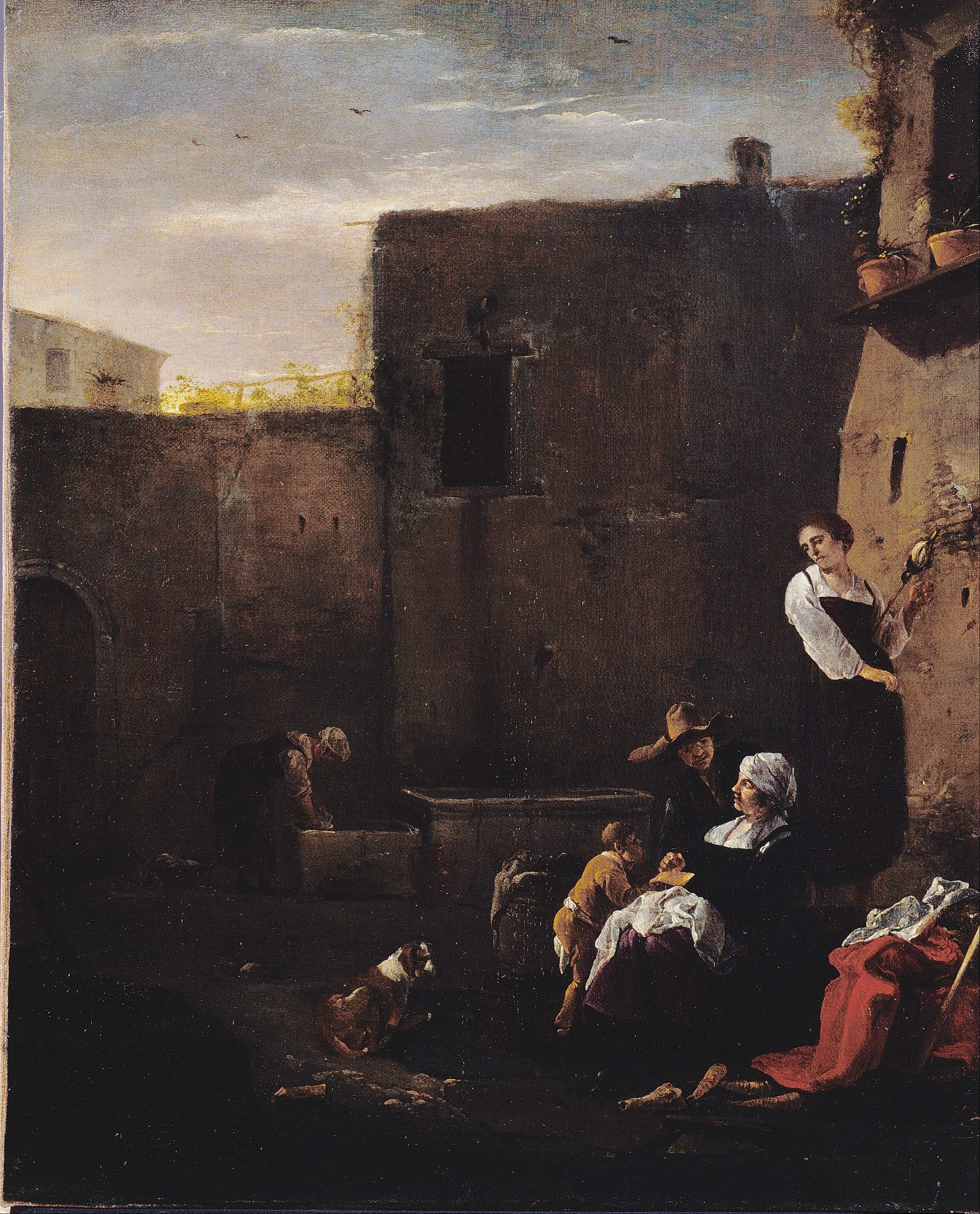
Italian Courtyard

A Scholar in his Study

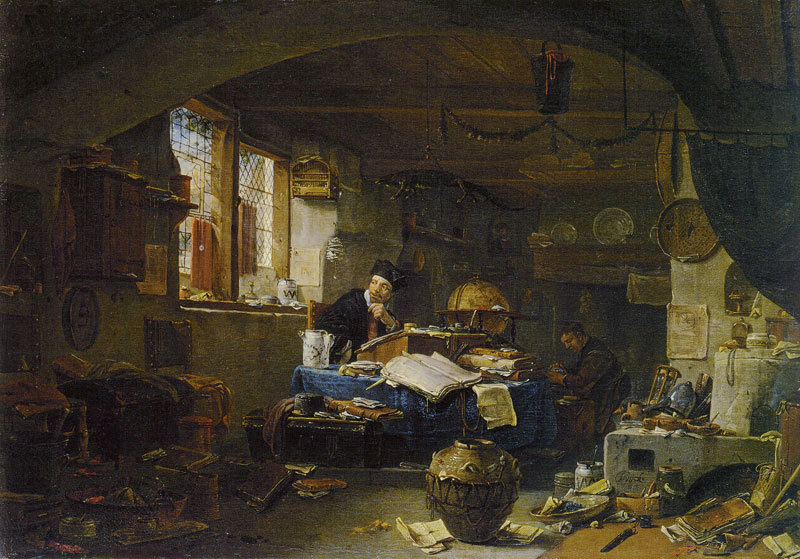
The alchemist in his laboratory

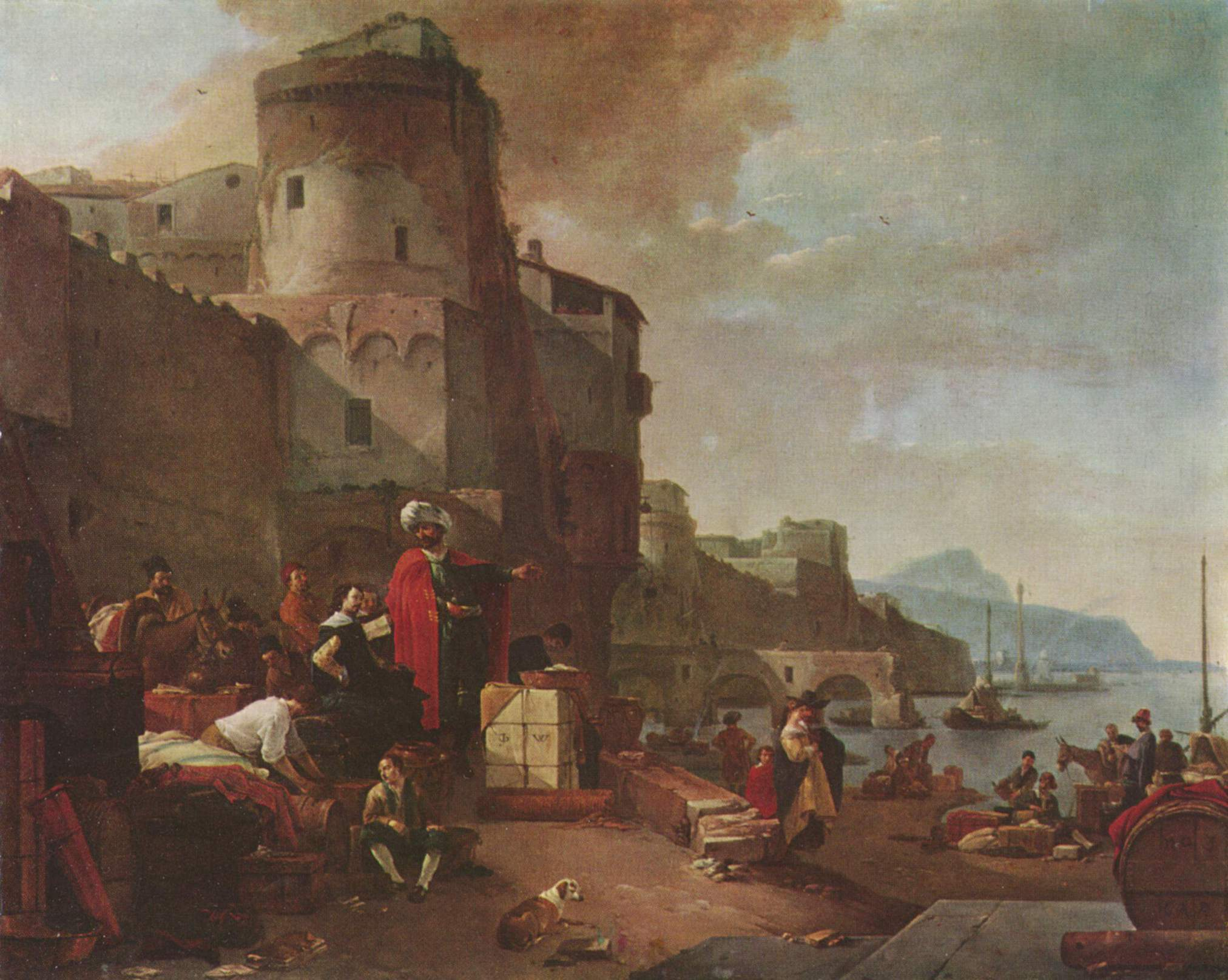
Italian port
