= William Graham (Royal Navy officer) =

Royal Navy Admiral (1826–1907)

Admiral Sir William Graham GCB
- Born: 10 September 1826
- Died: 31 May 1907 (aged 80); Bath, Somerset
- Military career
- Allegiance: United Kingdom
- Branch: Royal Navy
- Rank: Admiral
- Commands: Royal Naval College, Greenwich
- Conflicts: Crimean War; Second Opium War
- Awards: Knight Grand Cross of the Order of the Bath

Admiral Sir William Graham, GCB (10 September 1826 – 31 May 1907) was a Royal Navy officer who went on to be Third Naval Lord and Controller of the Navy.

== Naval career ==
Graham was appointed a lieutenant in the Royal Navy in 1849 and served in the Baltic Sea during the Crimean War in 1855 and at the capture of Canton during the Second Opium War in 1857. Promoted to captain in 1863, he was given command of HMS Danae, HMS Immortalité, HMS Resistance, HMS Black Prince and then HMS Aurora. He was appointed Captain of the training school HMS Britannia in 1875, Admiral-Superintendent of Malta Dockyard in 1882 and Third Naval Lord and Controller of the Navy in 1886. His last appointment was as President of the Royal Naval College, Greenwich in 1888.

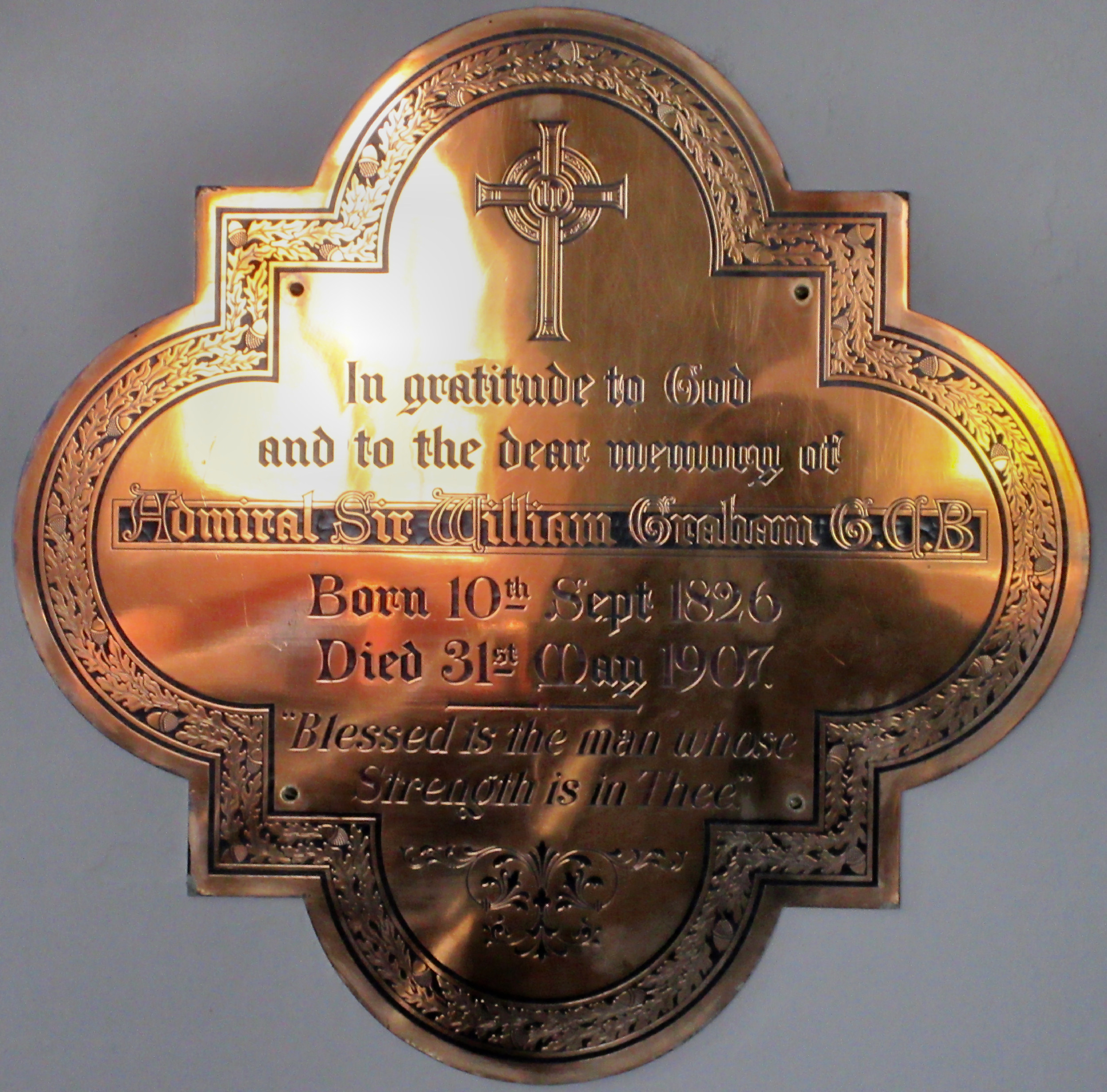
Memorial in St Andrew's Church, Ham

He died at 13 Pulteney Street in Bath in 1907.

Military offices
Preceded by John McCrea	Admiral Superintendent, Malta Dockyard; 1882–1885	Succeeded by William Ward
Preceded by Sir Thomas Brandreth	Third Naval Lord and Controller of the Navy; 1886–1888	Succeeded by Sir John Hopkins
Preceded by Sir Thomas Brandreth	President, Royal Naval College, Greenwich; 1888–1891	Succeeded by Sir Richard Hamilton
