= Manchester Library & Information Service =

Public library service in Manchester, England

Coordinates: 53.479242°N 2.248737°W

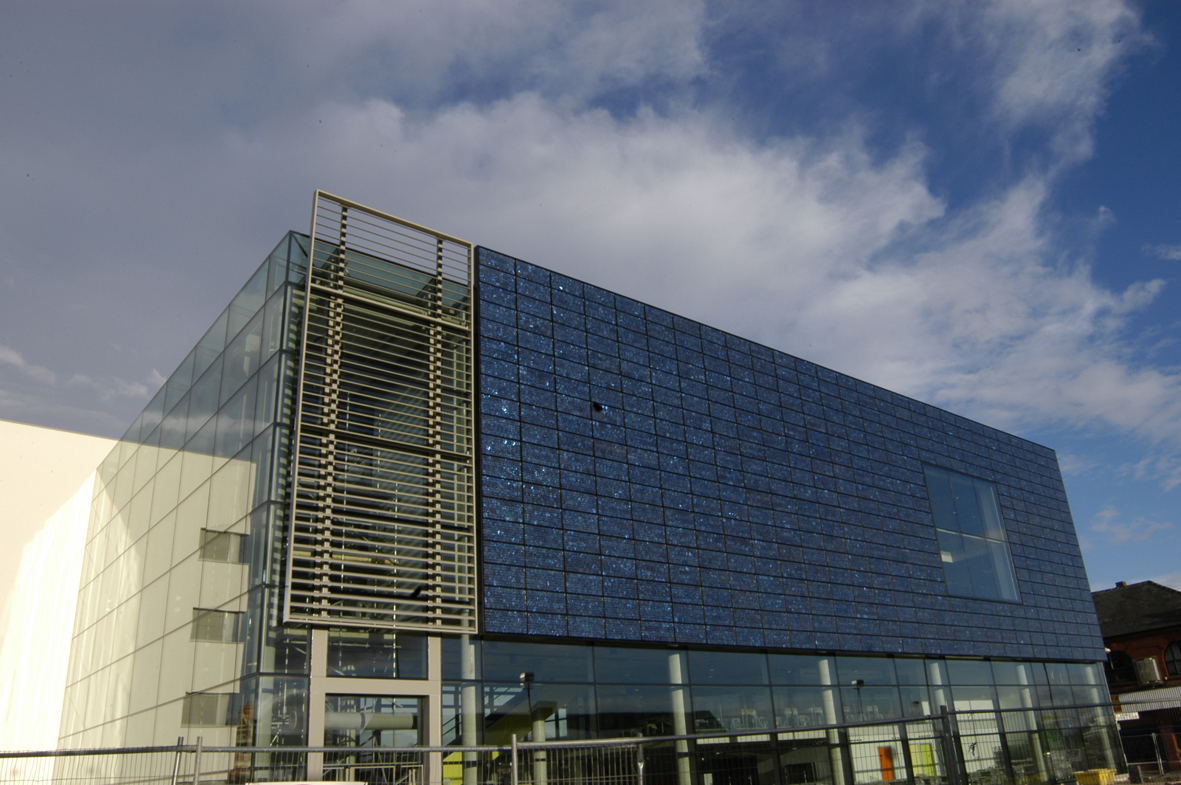
North City Library, Manchester, UK

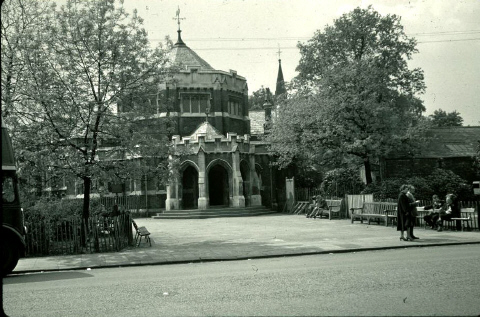
Didsbury Library

There are 24 public libraries in Manchester, England, including the famous Central Library in St Peter’s Square.

The oldest community library still in use is Levenshulme Library in South Manchester, built in 1903. Levenshulme Library is also a Carnegie library, having been built with money donated by Scottish-American businessman and philanthropist Andrew Carnegie, who funded the building of over 2,500 libraries across the world. Two new multimillion-pound libraries have recently opened in North Manchester as part of a major regeneration scheme, including the eco-designed North City Library in Harpurhey. and The Avenue Library and Learning Centre in Higher Blackley.

== History ==
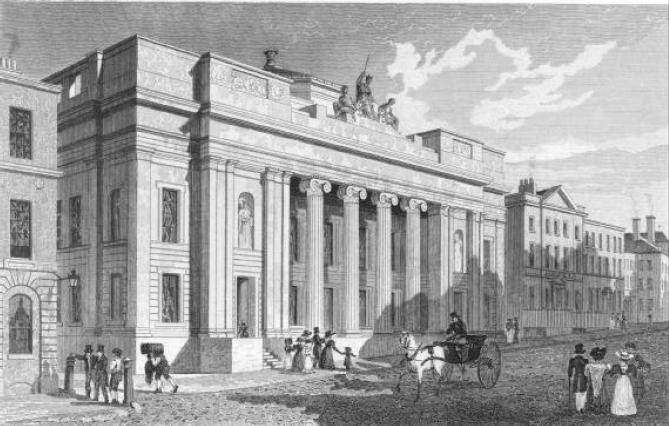
The original Manchester Town Hall

Coat of arms as used by the libraries in 1899

Seal as used by the libraries in 1899

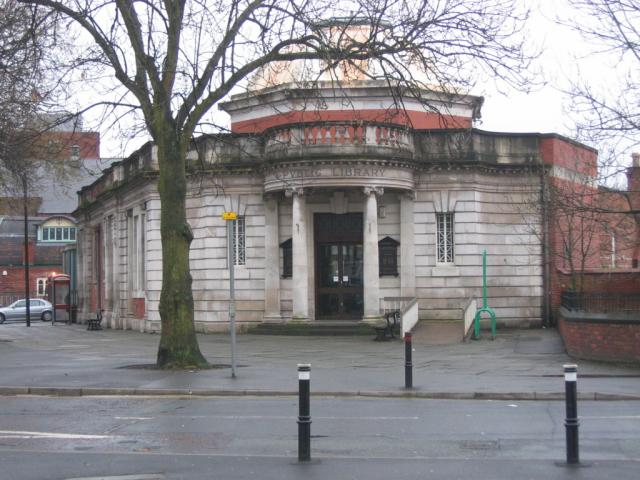
Chorlton Library

There has been a public library service in Manchester since 1852, when the Manchester Free Library opened in the Hall of Science, Campfield, on the site of what is now the Museum of Science and Industry. Famous figures such as Charles Dickens and William Thackeray attended and spoke at its inauguration. Manchester had taken advantage of powers granted by the Public Libraries Act 1850 (13 & 14 Vict. c. 65) to become the first local authority to establish a rate-supported public lending and reference library. Andrea Crestadoro, Chief Librarian of the city 1864–1879, is credited with being the first person to propose that books could be catalogued by using keywords that did not occur in the title of the book.

In 1915 the libraries consisted of a reference library, 24 lending libraries, a foreign library, the Henry Watson Music Library and the Thomas Greenwood Library for Librarians. The number of volumes altogether exceeded half a million and the stock of the lending libraries was arranged according to the Dewey Decimal Classification. The library was housed in temporary buildings in Piccadilly on the site of the former Manchester Royal Infirmary. The Moss Side library contained special collections on Thomas de Quincey, Mrs. Gaskell and the Brontës and the foreign library was temporarily housed at the Cheetham branch. The Henry Watson Music Library contained 30,000 volumes and hundreds of thousands of pieces of music; the Thomas Greenwood Library for Librarians contained about 15,000 volumes. After the vacation of the first town hall in King Street the building was reused for the public lending library.

== Branch libraries ==
These include libraries in Chorlton-cum-Hardy, Hulme, Withington and Didsbury. The Withington Library (1927), on Wilmslow Road, was designed by Henry Price.

In 1971 there were 20 branch libraries and services were provided by four mobile libraries or by caravans to a further 19 areas.

== Central Library building project, 2010–13 ==
The Central Library was closed from 2010 to 2013 for major refurbishment and expansion. During the closure its books were stored in a disused part of the Winsford salt mine. Some of its services were available at a temporary location nearby. A new community library for the city centre on Deansgate was provided. The community library occupied Elliott House, Deansgate (between Lloyd Street and Jackson's Row).

== Librarians ==
=== Chief Librarians ===
- Edward Edwards, 1850–1858
- Robert Wilson Smiles, 1858–1864
- Andrea Crestadoro, 1864–1879
- Charles W. Sutton, 1879–1920
- L. Stanley Jast, 1920–1931
- Charles Nowell, 1932–1954
- D. I. Colley, 1955–1974
- Kenneth W. King, 1975 - ?

=== Directors of Libraries ===
- David Owen, 1980-1998
- Paul Catcheside, 1998-2000
- Lis Phelan, 2000-2003
- Vicky Rosin MBE, 2003-2005

=== Heads of Libraries ===
- Nicky Parker, 2005-2009
- Neil MacInnes OBE, 2010-2015

=== Heads of Libraries, Galleries and Culture ===
- Neil MacInnes OBE, 2015-

=== Other librarians ===
- Ernest Axon (c. 1915)
- L. George Lovell (c. 1975)
