= Thomas Shaw Brandreth =

English mathematician, inventor and classicist (1788–1873)

Thomas Shaw Brandreth, FRS (24 July 1788 – 27 May 1873) was an English mathematician, inventor and classicist.

== Early life and education ==
Brandreth was the son of a Cheshire physician, Joseph Brandreth. He studied at Eton and received a BA from Trinity College, Cambridge in 1810 as Second Wrangler, second Smith's Prizeman, and chancellor's medalist, attesting to his keen intelligence. He received his MA in 1813, and was subsequently elected to a fellowship at Trinity. He then entered the Inns of Court, initially at Lincoln's Inn in 1810, but he migrated to the Inner Temple in 1813 and was called to the bar in 1818. He entered legal practice at Liverpool, but was much diverted from advancement by his interest in inventions.

== Inventions ==
Elected a Fellow of the Royal Society in 1821 for mathematical achievements, he had by that time invented a logometer (an early slide rule), and went on to design and patent a friction wheel and a clock escapement. These achievements led him into friendship with George Stephenson, and he played a role in the survey and engineering of the Liverpool and Manchester Railway, particularly the crossing of Chat Moss. However, he resigned as a director of the line shortly before its completion.

In the early days of railroading, it was by no means clear that the steam locomotive would come to be the principal form of propulsion for trains. Brandreth invented a machine which used a horse galloping on a treadmill as its source of motive power. A prototype, the Cycloped, participated in the Rainhill Trials in 1829, but it had to be withdrawn when the horse broke through the floor of the machine. In any case, the trials proved the superiority of steam motive power in all but exceptional circumstances.

== Family, judicial office, and Homer ==
Brandreth married a Harriet Byrom, of Fairview (a suburb of Liverpool), in 1822, by whom he had two daughters and five sons, among them Thomas Brandreth, a distinguished naval officer. A move to London further diminished his legal practice, and he ultimately declined the offer of a judgeship in Jamaica and retired to Worthing and devoted himself to the education of his children.

In retirement, he again took up the study of classical literature, and made a lengthy inquiry into the use of the digamma in the works of Homer. His studies were published in 1844 as A Dissertation on the Metre of Homer; and reflected in an edition of the Iliad with digammas. This was followed by a well-received translation of the Iliad into blank verse in 1846. Brandreth died in Worthing in 1873. He took an interest of local affairs, becoming a justice of the peace for West Sussex and taking a hand in the improvement of the town's infrastructure.
