= Matthew Turner (physician) =

British physician and writer (died 1788)

Matthew Turner (died 1788), a Liverpool physician, is considered (for example by Berman, 1990) to be the author or co-author of the 1782 pamphlet, Answer to Dr. Priestley's Letters to a Philosophical Unbeliever, the first published work of avowed atheism in Britain. Turner was also a pioneer in the use of ether for medical purposes, and wrote a pamphlet on the subject. In a footnote, Turner was the man who introduced Josiah Wedgwood to Thomas Bentley in Liverpool, a friendship which led to the formation of the company that produced the famous pottery.

Turner was a friend of Peter Perez Burdett and his scientific knowledge was referred to Joseph Wright of Derby when he constructed his painting of The Alchemist Discovering Phosphorus in 1771 which is now in Derby Museum and Art Gallery.
