= Timothy Burstall =

British Railway Pioneer

Timothy Burstall (1776–1860) was a British engineer and pioneer in the field of locomotive construction.

== Biography ==
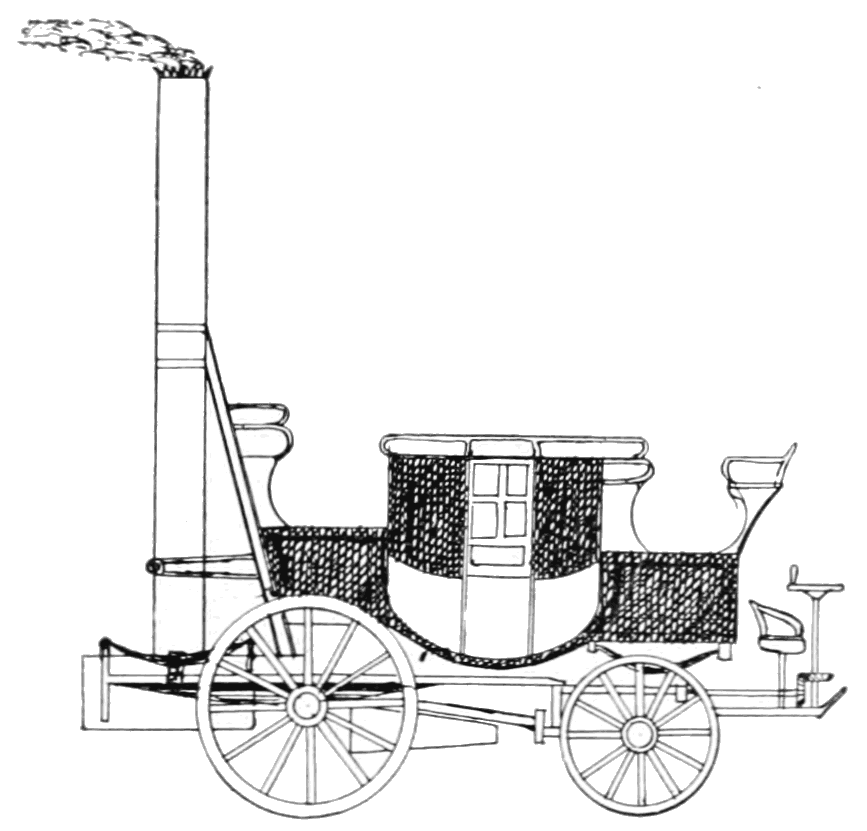
Burstalls and Hills Steam Car of 1824

Only fragmentary information is available on Burstall's life and work. In 1824 he collaborated with John Hill under the name of Burstall and Hill of London to construct a two-axle road steam carriage for passenger freight and mail transport, following it in the following year by the Patent No. 5090 dated February 3, 1825. During test drives, however, it was found that the machine was not up to the vibrations caused by the bad roads and suffered too much damage.

In 1826, Burstall and Hill filed another patent (No. 5405 from August 22) for a three-axle steam car, in which the boiler was to rest on its own base separately from the car body. In October of the same year, this second steam car reached speeds of up to 6 miles per hour during test drives on Ferry Road in Glasgow. In late July 1827, the car's boiler exploded while driving on a property on Westminster Road in London, injuring John Hill's younger brother.

== Burstall's locomotive Perseverance ==
In 1829, Burstall built the Perseverance locomotive to take part in the Rainhill race. However, the machine was damaged during transport when the heavy freight cart pulled by horses overturned on the road to the trials. Burstall spent five days repairing the Perseverance while the other locomotives were being tested. When he had finally set her up on the sixth and last day, it turned out to be far too underpowered: During the trials the winning machine, Rocket had reached a speed of 30 miles per hour (48 km / h) with a train load of 13 tons, Burstall's locomotive only managed 6 miles during the first test runs without load and thus remained well below the required minimum speed of 10 mph. Burstall then withdrew his machine from the competition and received an extraordinary expense bonus of £26.

After the failure in Rainhill, Burstall no longer appeared as a locomotive designer and the references to his work become sparse. In 1841 he was recorded working as a civil engineer in Somerset, and in 1860 he died in Glasgow.

== Family ==
Burstall was married twice: on 9 February 1804 he was married to Charlotte Radwell in the Church of St. Martin-in-the-Fields in London, and on 14 November 1825 he married Mariann Price in Leith. The second marriage produced two sons in 1830 and 1838, both of whom, like their father, were given the name Timothy.

== Sources ==
- Carlson, Robert (1969). The Liverpool and Manchester Railway Project 1821–1831. Newton Abbot: David and Charles. ISBN 0-7153-4646-6. OCLC 468636235. OL 4538910W.
- Chapman Frederick Marshall: A History of Railway Locomotives down to the End of the Year 1831. The Locomotive Publishing Co. Ltd., 1928
- William Fletcher: Steam Locomotion on Common Roads. E. & F. N. Spon, 1891
- James W. Lowe: British Steam Locomotive Builders. Guild Publishing, 1975
- Christopher McGowan: The Rainhill Trials. Little, Brown Book Group Limited, 2004
- Thomas, R. G. H. (1980). The Liverpool & Manchester Railway. London: B. T. Batsford. ISBN 0713405376. OCLC 6355432. OL 6395958W.
