= Perseverance (Rainhill Trials) =

Early steam locomotive

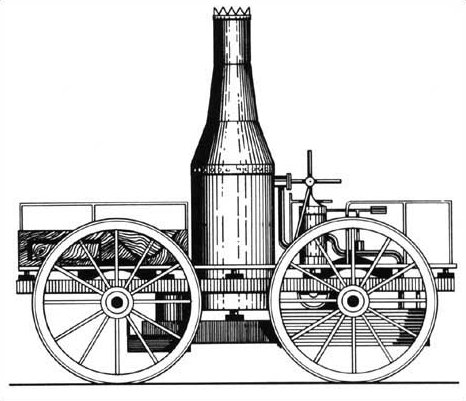
Type and origin
- Power type: Steam
- Builder: Burstall and Hill
Specifications

Perseverance was an early steam locomotive that took part in the Rainhill trials. Built by John Reed Hill of London and Timothy Burstall of Leith; the name of the locomotive was taken from "Persevere", Leith's town motto.

Perseverance was damaged on the way to the trials and Burstall spent the first five days trying to repair his locomotive. It ran on the sixth and final day of the trials but only achieved a speed of 6 mph (9.7 km/h). Burstall and Hill were awarded a consolation prize of £25.

Burstall and Hill used roller bearings for the axles, an important step in locomotive development. The design, adapted from a road-going steam coach, incorporated 2 cylinders, a vertical boiler and weighed 2.9 tons.

== See also ==
- Rothwell, Hick & Co. - built a similar locomotive after the Rainhill Trials.
