= Andrea Crestadoro =

Librarian and inventor (1808–1879)

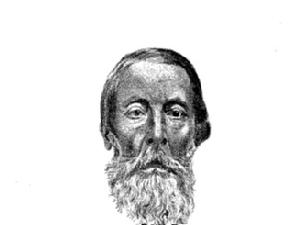
- Sketch from 1879
- Born: 1808; Genoa
- Died: 1879 (aged 70–71)
- Occupations: Librarian and curator
- Spouse: Margaret Elizabeth Chittleburgh
- Parent: John Baptista Crestadoro

Dr. Andrea Crestadoro (1808–1879) was a bibliographer who became Chief Librarian of Manchester Free Library, 1864–1879. He is credited with being the first person to propose that books could be catalogued by using keywords that did not occur in the title of the book. His ideas also included a metallic balloon, reform of the tax system, and improvements to a railway locomotive – the Impulsoria – that was powered by four horses on a treadmill.

== Biography ==
Andrea Crestadoro was born in Genoa in 1808 and was educated there before he studied for his doctorate in philosophy at the University of Turin. He came to notice in 1849 when he left his position as Professor of Philosophy at the University of Turin to come to England to further his interest in mechanical devices. In England he took out a number of patents including improvements to the Impulsoria.

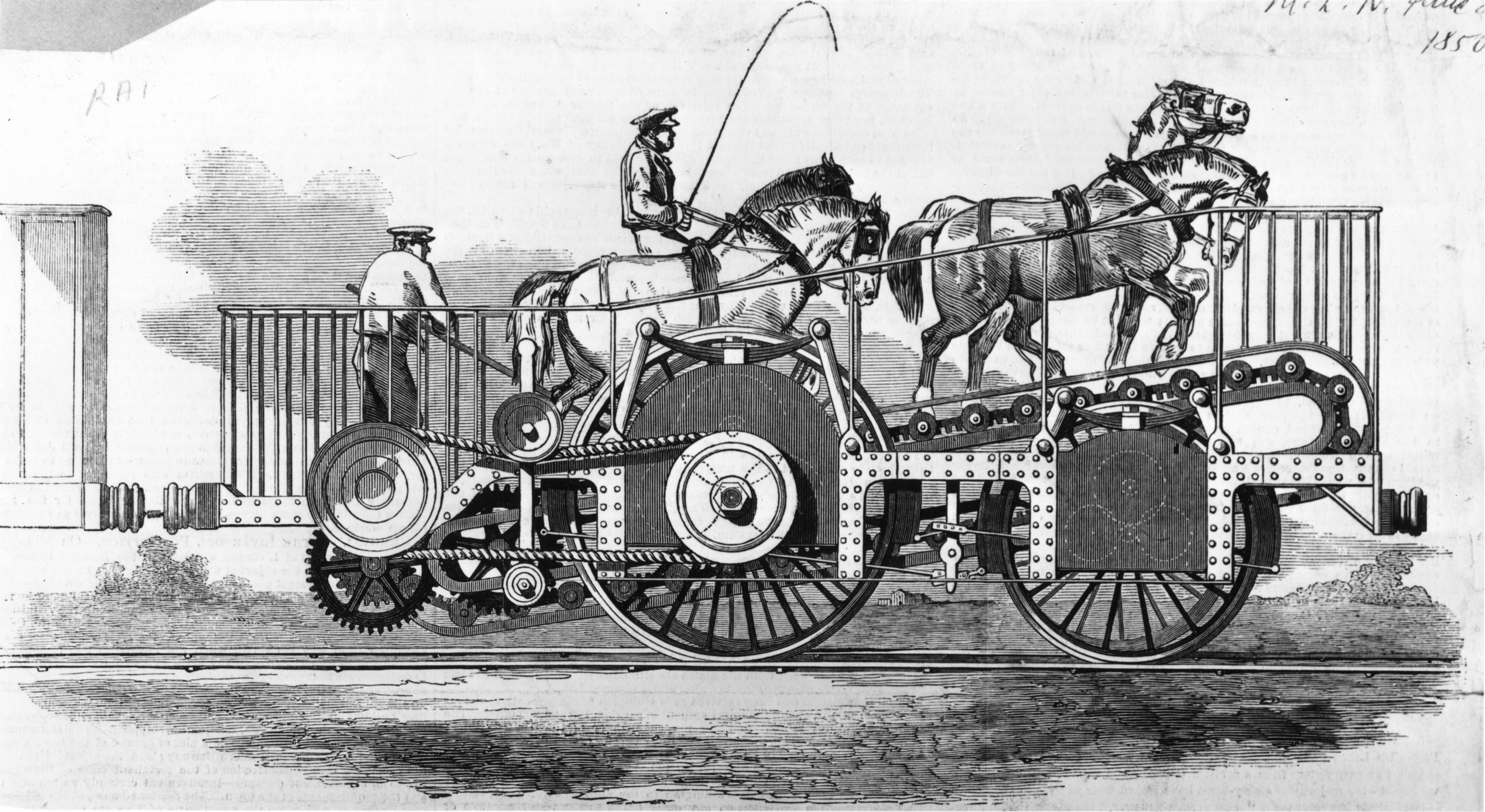
The Impulsoria in 1850

Crestadoro improved the design of an unusual device called the Impulsoria, which was a mobile treadmill-powered locomotive. The invention was made by Clemente Masserano, who was from Pignerol in Italy. Following his improvements Crestadoro exhibited the Impulsoria at The Great Exhibition held in the Crystal Palace in 1851. The power was transferred to the wheels using chains and a gearbox that allowed it to climb. It was said to be able to pull 30 wagons up an incline and could be used with two or four horses.

Another suggestion from Crestadoro was to replace the paddle wheels or propellers on steamships with a smooth cylinder. He argued that the paddles or propeller blades were unnecessary, proposing smooth cylinders instead, which he suggested would gain traction by being immersed in the water.

Crestadoro was given the task of creating a catalogue for the Manchester Library. He is credited with being the first person to propose that books could be catalogued by using keywords that did not occur in the title of the book. The system was called keyword in titles, which was first proposed for Manchester libraries in 1864. This system was developed many years later as Key Word in Context (KWIC) by Hans Peter Luhn and was used in early computer based indexing.

Crestadoro was an acquaintance of Anthony Panizzi, Principal Librarian of the British Museum and he was employed as a reader there. Exasperated by the delays in the publication by the British Museum of a Catalogue of Printed Books, Crestadoro wrote The Art of Making Catalogues of Libraries: Or A Method To Obtain In A Short Time A Most Perfect, Complete, And Satisfactory Printed Catalogue Of The British Museum Library which was published anonymously in 1856. The catalogue was to include 800,000 books but it had been in progress for over 20 years and consumed generous grants that had far exceeded £100,000 in 1853.

Crestadoro published books on a number of subjects. His 1868 book proposed a method of dispensing with both gas and ballast by using a metallic balloon for flight. This too was exhibited at Crystal Palace in 1868. At the end of his life he was publishing ideas for the fairer allocation of taxation. After Crestadoro died in 1879 it was discovered that there was a partly built glider in one of the Manchester libraries.

== Works ==
- The Art Of Making Catalogues Of Libraries: Or A Method To Obtain In A Short Time A Most Perfect, Complete, And Satisfactory Printed Catalogue Of The British Museum Library, 1856
- Catalogue of the books in the Manchester free library: Reference department
- Air locomotion dispensing with gas and ballast, 1868
- On the best and fairest mode of raising the public revenue, 1876
- Taxation Reform Or the Best and Fairest Means of Raising the Public Revenue, Paper at the Congress of the National Association for the Promotion of Social Science, Section Economy and Trade, Cheltenham, 1878
