= Susannah Dobson =

- Born: Susannah Dobson (née Dawson) c.1742 Toxteth
- Died: 29 September 1795 (aged 52–53)
- Occupation: translator
- Spouse: Dr Matthew Dobson
- Children: 3

Susannah Dobson née Dawson (c. 1742 – 29 September 1795) was a translator from the south of England, the daughter of John Dawson of "the parish of St Dunstan, London". She was notably concerned with the 14th-century Italian humanist Petrarch.

== Life ==
Susannah Dawson married in 1759 a physician and medical writer, Dr Matthew Dobson of Liverpool, where she wrote her Life of Petrarch. He died in Bath, Somerset in 1784. Their three children were Susannah (born 1764), Dawson (born 1766), and Elisa (1760/1761–1778). It has also been suggested that Susannah Dawson was born in Toxteth, near Liverpool, in 1742.

Frances Burney mentions that in 1780 Susannah Dobson had ambitions to join Mrs Thrale's circle, but the latter was not keen: "Mrs Dobson... persecutes me strangely as if with violent & undesired Friendship; yet Mrs Lewis says She is jealous." One modern view of what Thrale wrote is that it implied Dobson was a lesbian. Burney wrote of her, "Though coarse, low-bred, forward, self-sufficient, and flaunting, she seems to have a strong masculine understanding." Her husband, Dr Dobson, had become Mrs Thrale's physician. Samuel Johnson, however, praised her as a "Directress of rational conversation".

Susannah Dobson died 30 September 1795, and was buried at St Paul's, Covent Garden.

== Works ==
In 1775, Dobson published in two volumes her Life of Petrarch, collected from "Mémoires pour la vie de François Petrarch" (by Jacques-François de Sade). According to a modern account, in "rendering down the Abbé de Sade's massive French original, she probes the actions and feelings of another age." Among her contemporaries who praised it were the novelists Clara Reeve and Elizabeth Benger. It was reprinted in 1777, and several times up to a sixth edition in 1805. She claimed in 1780 that it had earned her £400.

Dobson's second work was to translate and abridge Sainte-Palaye's The Literary History of the Troubadours, which appeared in 1779. In 1784, she translated the same author's Memoirs of Ancient Chivalry, and in 1791 Petrarch's De remediis utriusque fortunae, as Petrarch's View of Human Life.

Also ascribed to Susannah Dobson are the anonymous didactic Dialogue on Friendship and Society (1777) and Historical Anecdotes of Heraldry and Chivalry, an original scholarly work published in Worcester (1795).
