= De remediis utriusque fortunae =

Collection of Latin dialogues written by Petrarch

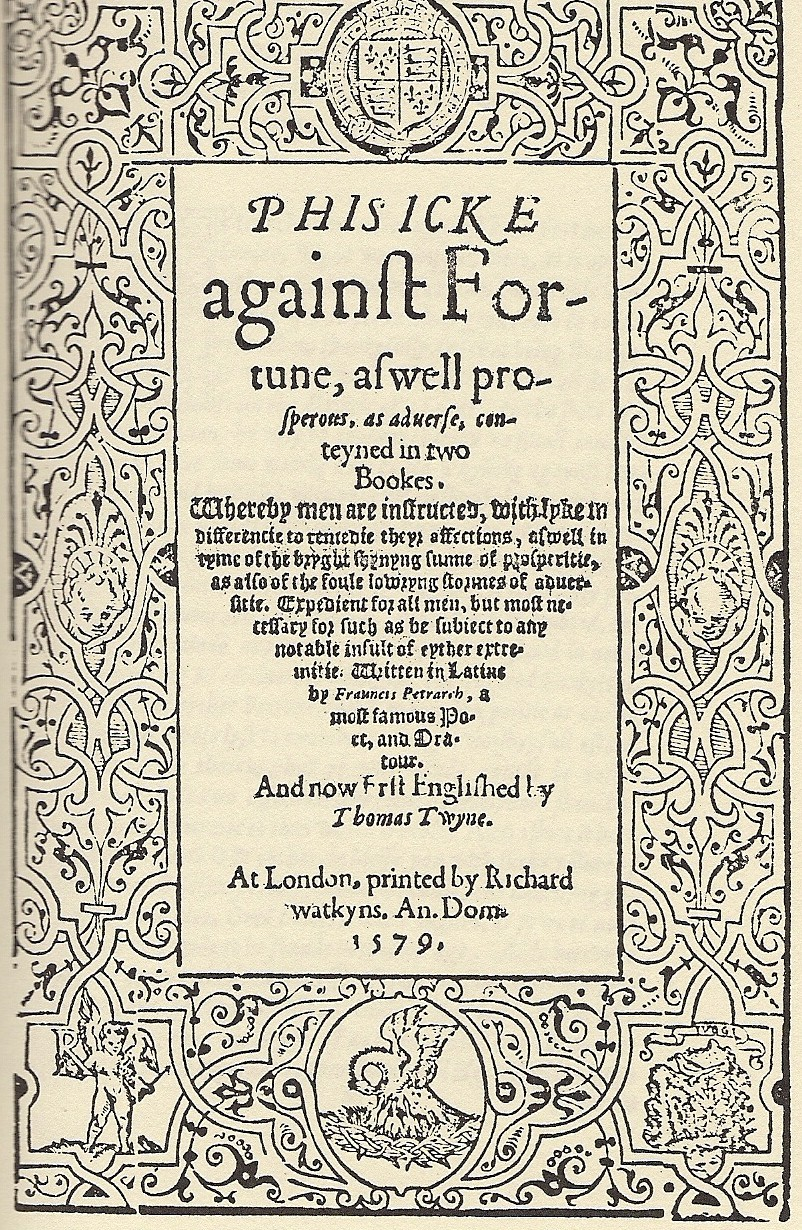
Phisicke Against Fortune book cover of 1579

De remediis utriusque fortunae ("Remedies for Fortunes") is a collection of 254 Latin dialogues written by the Italian humanist Francesco Petrarca (1304–1374), commonly known as Petrarch. The work was composed between (1354–1366) and was one of the most widely circulated of Petrarch's latin works. The work was organized into two sections one on prosperity the other on adversity.

== Content ==
De remediis is divided into two books. Book I (De prosperis) contains 122 dialogues on the dangers of good fortune and Book II (De adversis) which contains 132 dialogues on adversity. With a total of 254 dialogues. These dialogues are between allegorical entities including "Joy", "Hope" and "Reason."

The dialogues display remarkably lucid ideas that are cogently expressed. Drawing on classical sources, Petrarch expounded on refinement in taste and intellect, on finesse and propriety in speech and style.

The writing is a bouquet of moral philosophy, set out to show how thought and deed can generate happiness on the one hand, or sorrow and disillusionment on the other. In a recurring theme throughout the dialogues, Petrarch advises humility in prosperity and fortitude in adversity.

The dialogue is a development of a type seen in Seneca's De remediis fortuitorum. It also draws on Cicero's Tusculan Disputations and Seneca's De tranquillitate animi.

== Composition ==
Petrarch began work on De remediis around 1354, when he addressed a dedicatory letter to Azzo da Correggio. Composition occurred when Petrarch was based in Milan under Visconti patronage from 1354 to 1362, then in Venice and Padua until 1366.

Petrarch substantially revised and retitled the work over the following six years which was completed on, October 4 1366.

== Print History ==
Over 150 complete manuscripts and 94 abridged or translated copies have been recorded, making De remediis one of the most widely circulated Latin prose works of the late medieval period.

The first printed edition appeared in 1468. For 1520, Sebastian Brant was involved in publishing an edition in Strassburg.

The 254 woodcut illustrations by the anonymous Master of Petrarch for the 1532 German edition are considered masterpieces of the German Renaissance.

In 1579, the dialogues were translated into English by the Elizabethan physician Thomas Twyne (1543–1613) as Phisicke Against Fortune, and by Susannah Dobson in 1791 as Petrarch's View of Human Life.
