= Rainhill trials =

Locomotive motive power competition (1829)

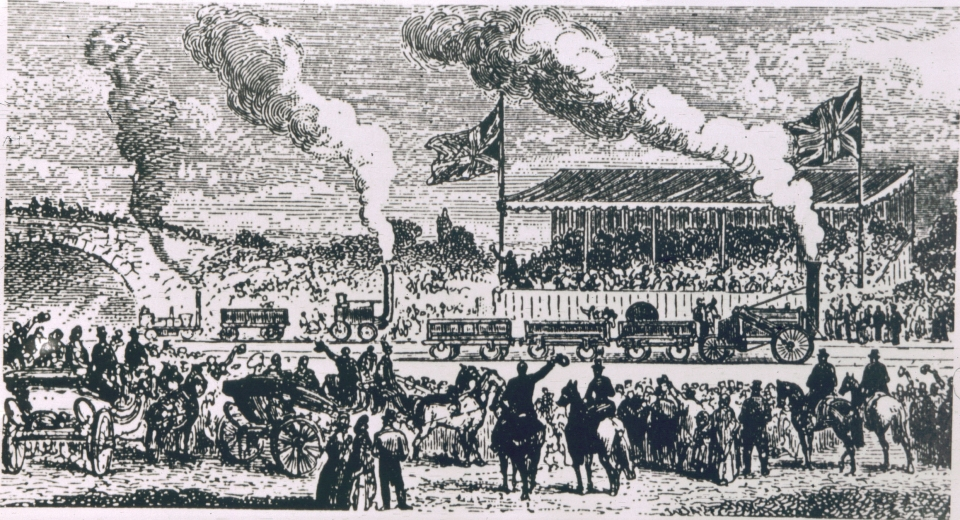
Later conjectural drawing of the Rainhill trials. In the foreground is Rocket and in the background are Sans Pareil (right) and Novelty.

The Rainhill trials were a competition run from 6 to 14 October 1829 to test George Stephenson's argument that locomotives would have the best motive power for the nearly-completed Liverpool and Manchester Railway (L&MR). Ten locomotives were entered, of which five were able to compete, running along a 1 mile (1.6 km) length of level track at Rainhill in Lancashire (now Merseyside).

Stephenson's Rocket was the only locomotive to complete the trials and was declared the winner. The directors of the L&MR accepted that locomotives should operate services on their new line, and George and Robert Stephenson were given the contract to produce locomotives for the railway.

== Background ==
The directors of the Liverpool and Manchester Railway had originally intended to use stationary steam engines to haul trains along the railway using cables. They had appointed George Stephenson as their engineer of the line in 1826, and he strongly advocated for the use of steam locomotives instead. As the railway was approaching completion, the directors decided to hold a competition to decide whether locomotives could be used to pull the trains; these became the Rainhill trials. A prize of £500 (equal to £47,460 today) was offered to the winner of the trials.

Three engineers were selected as judges: John Urpeth Rastrick, a locomotive engineer of Stourbridge; Nicholas Wood, a mining engineer from Killingworth with considerable locomotive design experience; and John Kennedy, a Manchester cotton spinner and a major proponent of the railway.

== Rules ==
The L&MR company set the rules for the trials. The rules went through several revisions; the final set, under which the competition was held, was:

"The weight of the Locomotive Engine, with its full complement of water in the boiler, shall be ascertained at the Weighing Machine, by eight o'clock in the morning, and the load assigned to it shall be three times the weight thereof. The water in the boiler shall be cold, and there shall be no fuel in the fireplace. As much fuel shall be weighed, and as much water shall be measured and delivered into the Tender Carriage, as the owner of the Engine may consider sufficient for the supply of the Engine for a journey of thirty-five miles. The fire in the boiler shall then be lighted, and the quantity of fuel consumed for getting up the steam shall be determined, and the time noted."

"The Tender Carriage, with the fuel and water, shall be considered to be, and taken as a part of the load assigned to the Engine."

"Those engines which carry their own fuel and water, shall be allowed a proportionate deduction from their load, according to the weight of the Engine."

"The Engine, with the carriages attached to it, shall be run by hand up to the Starting Post, and as soon as the steam is got up to fifty pounds per square inch (3.4 bar), the engine shall set out upon its journey."

"The distance the Engine shall perform each trip shall be one mile and three quarters (2.8 km) each way, including one-eighth of a mile (200 m) at each end for getting up the speed and for stopping the train; by this means the Engine, with its load, will travel one and a-half mile (2.4 km) each way at full speed."

"The Engines shall make ten trips, which will be equal to a journey of 35 miles (56 km); thirty miles (48 km) whereof shall be performed at full speed, and the average rate of travelling shall not be less than ten miles per hour (16 km/h)." (Note: The only other passenger railway in the world at that time, the Stockton and Darlington Railway, had an average speed of only about 8 miles per hour (13 km/h).)

"As soon as the Engine has performed this task (which will be equal to the travelling from Liverpool to Manchester), there shall be a fresh supply of fuel and water delivered to her; and, as soon as she can be got ready to set out again, she shall go up to the Starting Post, and make ten trips more, which will be equal to the journey from Manchester back again to Liverpool."

"The time of performing every trip shall be accurately noted, as well as the time occupied in getting ready to set out on the second journey."

"The gauge of the railway to be 4 ft 8 1/2 in (1,435 mm)."

== Entries ==
Ten locomotives were officially entered for the trials, but on the day the competition began – 6 October 1829 – only five were available to run:

- Cycloped, a horse-powered locomotive built by Thomas Shaw Brandreth.
- Novelty, the world's first tank locomotive, built by John Ericsson and John Braithwaite.
- Perseverance, a vertical boilered locomotive, built by Timothy Burstall.
- Rocket, designed by George and Robert Stephenson; built by Robert Stephenson and Company.
- Sans Pareil, built by Timothy Hackworth.
The entrants at the Rainhill trials
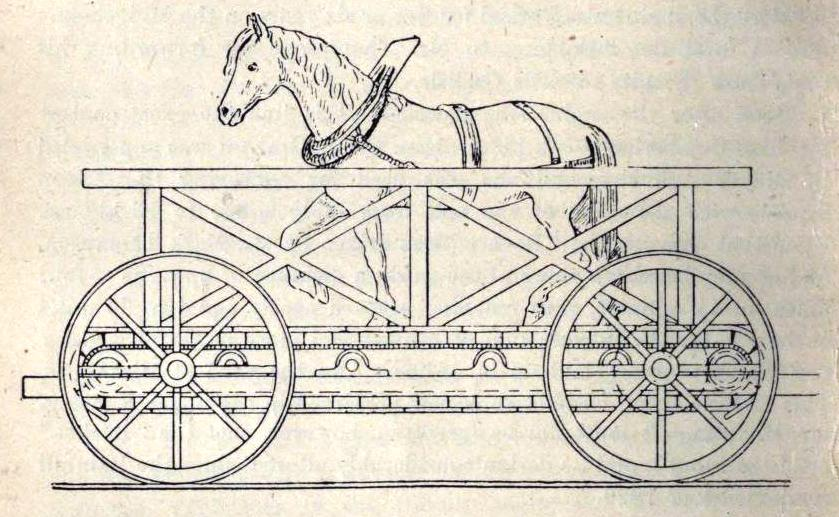
Brandreth's Cycloped

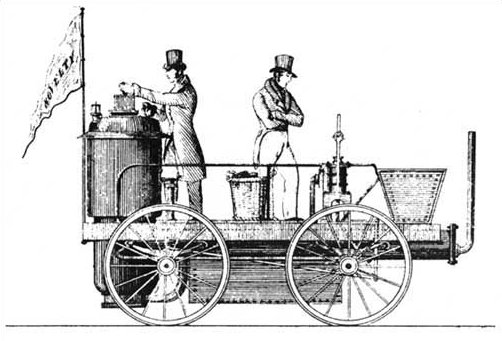
Ericsson and Braithwaite's Novelty

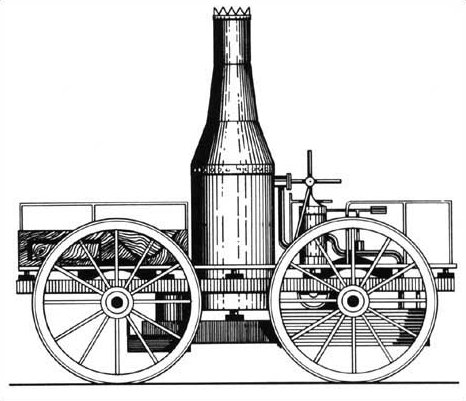
Burstall's Perseverance

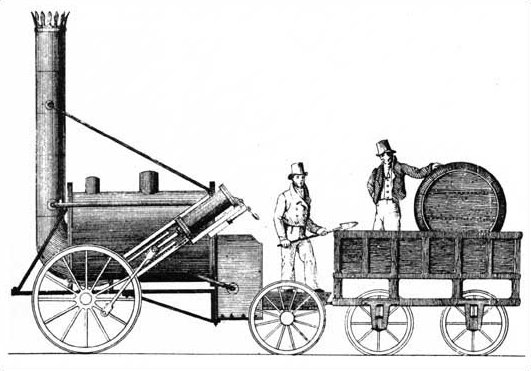
Stephenson's Rocket

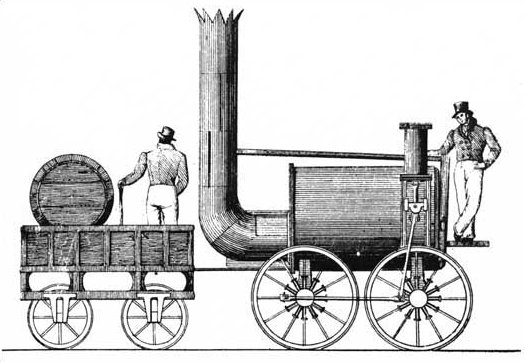
Hackworth's Sans Pareil

== Competition ==
The length of the L&MR that ran past Rainhill village was straight and level for over 1 mile (1.6 km) and was chosen as the site for the trials. The locomotives were to run at Kenrick's Cross, on the mile east from the Manchester side of Rainhill Bridge. Two or three locomotives ran each day, and several tests for each locomotive were performed over the course of six days. Between 10,000 and 15,000 people turned up to watch the trials, and bands provided musical entertainment.

Cycloped was the first to drop out of the competition. It used a horse walking on a drive belt for power and was withdrawn after an accident caused the horse to burst through the floor of the engine.

The next locomotive to retire was Perseverance, which was damaged in transit to the competition. Burstall spent the first five days of the trials repairing his locomotive, and though it ran on the sixth day, it failed to reach the required 10 miles per hour (16 km/h) speed and was withdrawn from the trial. It was granted a £25 consolation prize (equal to £2,373 today).

Sans Pareil nearly completed the trials, though at first there was some doubt as to whether it would be allowed to compete as it was 300 pounds (140 kg) overweight. It completed eight trips before cracking a cylinder. Despite the failure it was purchased by the L&MR, where it ran for two years before being leased to the Bolton and Leigh Railway.

The last locomotive to drop out was Novelty which used advanced technology for the time and was lighter and considerably faster than the other locomotives in the competition. It was the crowd favourite and reached a then-astonishing 28 miles per hour (45 km/h) on the first day of competition. It later suffered damage to a boiler pipe which could not be fixed properly on site. Nevertheless, it ran the next day and reached 15 miles per hour (24 km/h) before the repaired pipe failed and damaged the engine severely enough that it had to be withdrawn.

The Rocket was the only locomotive that completed the trials. It averaged 12 miles per hour (19 km/h) and achieved a top speed of 30 miles per hour (48 km/h) hauling 13 tons, so it was declared the winner of the £500 prize (equal to £47,460 today). The Stephensons were given the contract to produce locomotives for the L&MR.

The Times carried a full report of the trials on 12 October 1829, from which the following extract are taken:

THURSDAY – THIRD DAY: Mr. Stephenson's engine, "The Rocket," weighing 4 tons 3 cwt., performed, to-day, the work required by the original conditions. The following is a correct account of the performance: The engine, with its complement of water, weighed 4 tons 5 cwt., and the load attached to it was 12 tons 15 cwt., and, with a few persons who rode, made it about 13 tons. The Journey was 1.21 mile each way, with an additional length of 220 yards at each end to stop the engine in, making in one Journey 3[?] miles. The first experiment was of 35 miles, which is exactly ten journeys, and, including all the stoppages at the ends, was performed in 3 hours and 10 minutes, being upwards of 11 miles an hour. After this a fresh supply of water was taken in, which occupied 16 minutes, when the engine again started, and ran 35 miles in 2 hours and 52 minutes, which is upwards of 12 miles an hour, including all stoppages. The speed of the engine, with its load when in full motion, was from 14 to 17 miles an hour; and had the whole distance been in one continuing direction, there is no doubt but the result would have been 16 miles an hour. The consumption of coke was very moderate, not exceeding half a ton in the whole 70 miles. At several parts of the journey the engine moved at 18 miles an hour. SATURDAY – FIFTH DAY: In the expectation of witnessing the Novelty perform its appointed task, the attendance of company on the ground was more numerous today than it had been on several of the preceding days. Three times its own weight having been attached to the engine, the machine commenced its task, and performed it at the rate of 16 miles in the hour. Mr. Stephenson's engine, the Rocket, also exhibited today. Its tender was completely detached from it, and the engine alone shot along the road at the almost incredible rate of 32 miles in the hour. So astonishing was the celerity with which the engine, without its apparatus, darted past the spectators, that it could be compared to nothing but the rapidity with which the swallow darts through the air. Their astonishment was complete, every one exclaiming involuntarily, "The power of steam".

== Additional trials ==
After the Rainhill trials, Rocket was tested on the Whiston incline and was able to haul eight tons at 16 miles per hour (26 km/h) and 12 tons at 12 1/2 miles per hour (20.1 km/h) up the 1:96 gradient.

== Re-enactments ==
=== Rocket 150 ===
In May 1980, the Rocket 150 celebration was held to mark the 150th anniversary of the opening of the Liverpool and Manchester Railway and the trials the year before.

A replica of Novelty was built for the event, which was also attended by replicas of Sans Pareil and Rocket (plus coach). On the first day of the Trials, the Rocket came off the rails as it was exiting the Bold Colliery sidings and buckled the rim of one of its large drive wheels. That evening, senior staff from a St Helens road transport company met a former colleague of the builder of the Rocket replica at a Liverpool hotel and agreed that, in the early hours of the following morning, they would urgently manufacture some steel parts (wedges) in their nearby workshops, to fix the bent drive wheel before the second day's parade commenced. At the same time, British Rail agreed to put a team of staff into the sidings at Bold to straighten the bent rails. Both activities were achieved on time and the Rocket ran successfully on the following two days of the Trials, though Sans Pareil was pushed by Lion and Novelty was on a wagon hauled by LMS Stanier Class 5 4-6-0 5000. As the line was then not electrified, the Advanced Passenger Train was also pushed, but by the latest diesel, Class 56, 077.

The 'Grand Cavalcade' on each of the three days featured up to 40 steam and diesel locomotives and other examples of modern traction, including:

- Lion, at the time of Rocket 150 the oldest operable steam locomotive in existence
  (The British-built US locomotive John Bull, seven years older, was steamed again in 1981)
- LNER Class A3 4-6-2 No. 4472 Flying Scotsman
- LMS 5XP Jubilee Class 4-6-0 No. 5690 Leander
- LNER Class A4 4-6-2 No. 4498 Sir Nigel Gresley
- LNER Class V2 2-6-2 No. 4771 Green Arrow
- GWR 2551 Collett Goods No. 3205
- LMS Ivatt Class 4 2-6-0 No. 43106
- BR Standard Class 9F 2-10-0 No. 92220 Evening Star, the last steam locomotive to be built by British Railways
- LMS Princess Royal Class 4-6-2 No. 6201 Princess Elizabeth

Two Class 86 locomotives 86214 Sans Pareil and 86235 Novelty were painted in a variation of the Large Logo Rail Blue livery where the BR logo was replaced by the Rocket 150 motif on a yellow background.

=== 2002 Restaging ===
In a 2002 restaging of the Rainhill trials using replica engines, neither Sans Pareil (11 out of 20 runs) nor Novelty (10 out of 20 runs) completed the course. In calculating the speeds and fuel efficiencies, it was found that Rocket would still have won, as its relatively modern technology made it a much more reliable locomotive than the others. Novelty almost matched it in terms of efficiency, but its firebox design caused it to gradually slow to a halt due to a buildup of molten ash (called "clinker") cutting off the air supply. The restaged trials were run over the Llangollen Railway, Wales, and were the subject of a 2003 BBC Timewatch documentary.

For the restaging, major compromises were made both for television and because of the differences in crew experience and the fuel used, and because of modifications made to the replicas for modern safety rules and modern materials and construction methods, as well as following operating experience. Comparisons were made between the engines only after calculations took into account these differences.
