= Joseph Brandreth =

English physician (1745–1815)

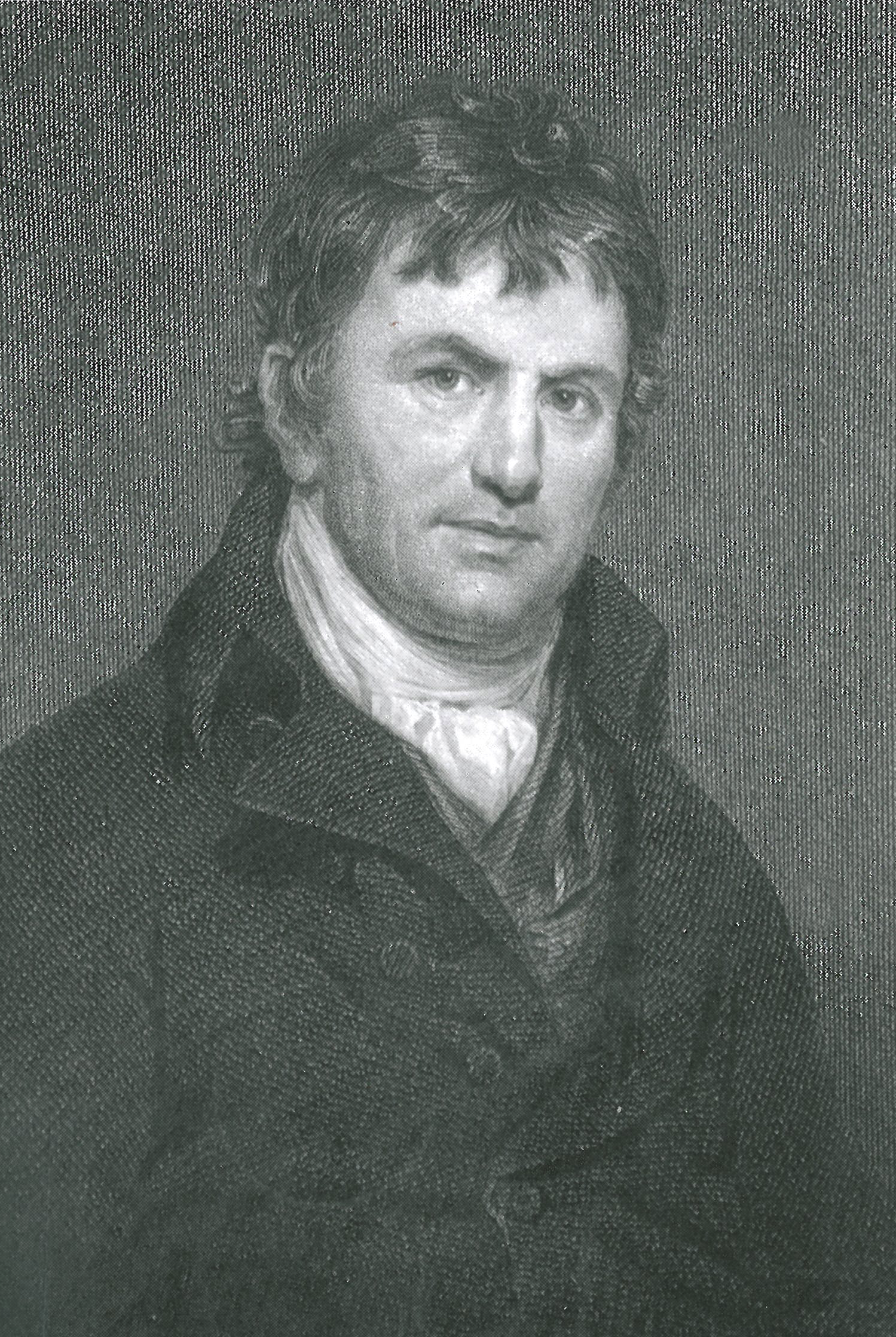
- Born: 10 October 1745; Ormskirk, Lancashire, England
- Died: 10 April 1815 (aged 69); Liverpool, Lancashire, England
- Known for: Physician to the Duke of Gloucester and Elizabeth, Countess of Derby

Joseph Brandreth M.D. (10 October 1745 – 10 April 1815) was an 18th-century English medical practitioner, who served as Physician to the Duke of Gloucester.

He was born at Ormskirk, Lancashire, in 1745. After taking a doctorate of Medicine at Edinburgh in 1770, where his thesis, De Febribus intermittentibus, was published, Brandreth exercised his profession in his native town until about 1776, when he succeeded to the practice of Matthew Dobson, in Liverpool, on Dr Dobson's retirement to Bath. He was appointed to the staff of the Infirmary in 1780, and was the first doctor in Liverpool to realise the value of applying cold water on fever. This remedy was described by Brandreth in a paper entitled On the Advantages arising from the Topical Application of Cold Water and Vinegar in Typhus and On the Use of Large Doses of Opium in certain cases. He practised in Liverpool for the remainder of his life, and became an eminently successful and popular practitioner. He was a man of wide and various reading, and possessed a most accurate and tenacious memory, which he attributed to his habit of depending on it without referring to notes. He established the Dispensary at Liverpool in 1778, and for thirty years gave great attention to the Infirmary. The Infirmary had 84 beds, and Brandreth and other senior physicians and surgeons gave their services free of charge. The discovery of the utility of applying cold in fever is ascribed to him. This remedy he described in a paper On the Advantages arising from the Topical Application of Cold Water and Vinegar in Typhus, and on the Use of Large Doses of Opium in certain Cases.

The most famous physician in Liverpool at this time was James Currie, who also led a distinctive life devoted to the services of mankind. Alongside Dr Currie, Brandreth was admitted to the Freedom of the Borough in 1802. Brandreth is also considered one of the leading physicians of Liverpool in the Hanoverian era.

Dr Joseph Brandreth lived on Church Street in the centre of Liverpool for some time during his practice. He died at Liverpool on 10 April 1815.

== Early life and family ==
Joseph Brandreth was born in 1745 at Ormskirk, Lancashire, England. Ormskirk is a market town situated on what was the ancient highway between Liverpool and Preston. He married Catherine Pilkington (1751–1827), daughter and co-heiress of John Pilkington of Anderton by his wife Catherine Shaw. Their marriage lasted 35 years, and produced 5 children. The family lived at 3 Paradise Street, then at 44 School Lane in Liverpool.

== Commemorations ==
The Brandeth Club of Ormskirk was founded by Dr Gerard Sanderson, Consultant Physician to the Ormskirk and District National Hospital, and named after Dr Joseph Brandreth who had lived at Ormskirk and, in his day, achieved great distinction as a physician.

There is a memorial to Dr Joseph Brandreth in the parish church of St Peter and St Paul, Ormskirk, which has the following inscription:

The Good Samaritan Memorial in Ormskirk Parish Church to Dr. Joseph Brandreth

SACRED to the MEMORY of JOSEPH BRANDRETH MD

PHYSICIAN to HIS ROYAL HIGHNESS the DUKE OF GLOUCESTER

The RT HON. EDWARD the EARL & ELIZABETH COUNTESS of DERBY

He was many years first Physician to the LIVERPOOL INFIRMARY

And zealously exerted himself in establishing the DISPENSARY.

His Industry and Talents raised him to the head of his Profession

While the kindness of his heart rendered him universally beloved.

Born 10th October 1745 - Died 10th April 1815

This Memorial was erected by his Widow

CATHERINE BRANDRETH

Who died 22nd April 1827, aged 75.
