= Henry Booth =

English railway pioneer businessman

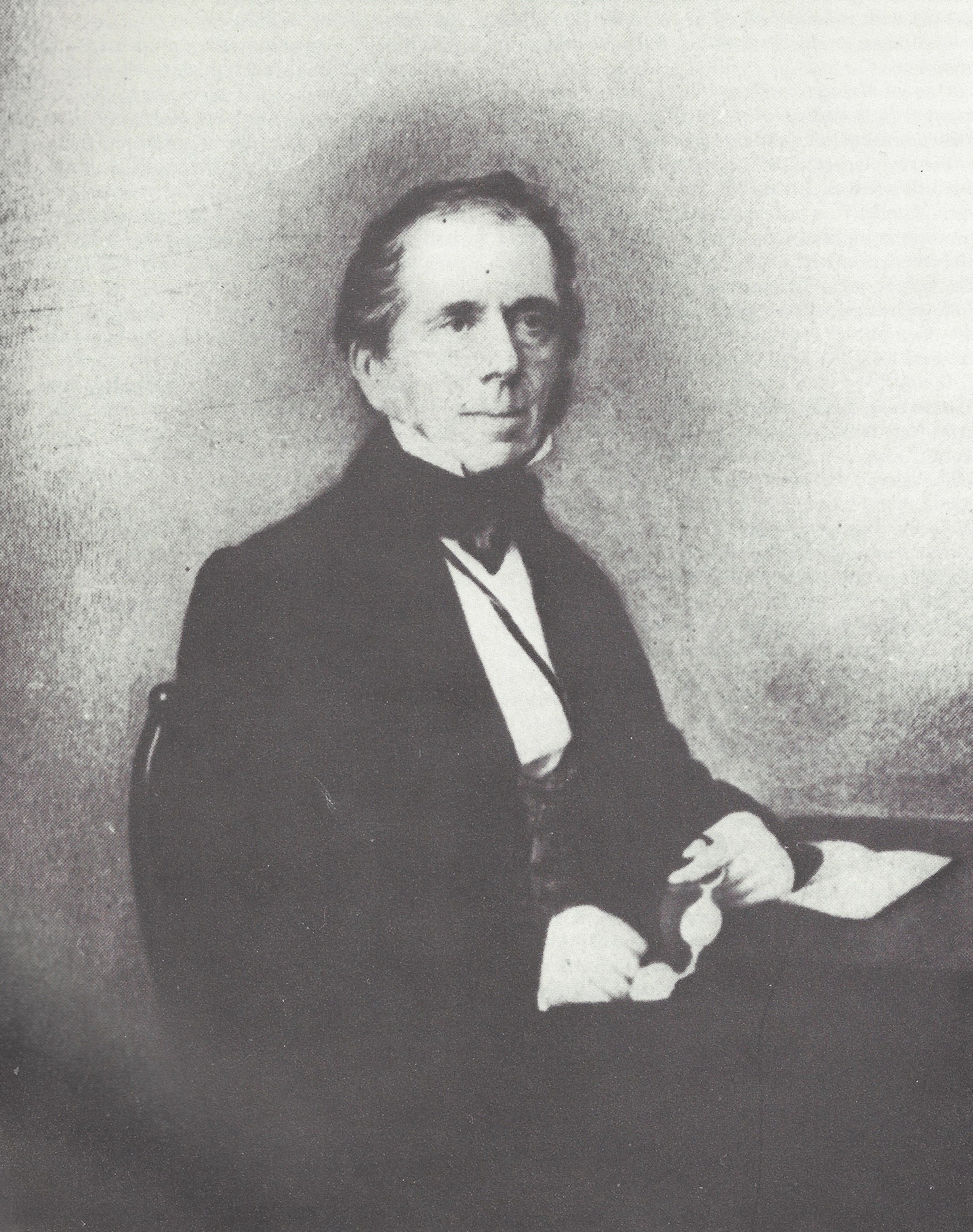
- Born: 4 April 1788; Liverpool, Lancashire
- Died: 28 March 1869 (aged 80); Liverpool, Lancashire
- Occupations: Corn merchant; Rail pioneer, businessman
- Known for: Liverpool & Manchester Railway; London North Western Railway
- Spouse: Ellen née Crompton (m. 1812)
- Children: 2 sons, 3 daughters (incl. Caroline Avison & Emily Boult)
- Relatives: Thomas Booth, Sheriff of Cheshire (cousin); Rt Hon. Charles Booth (great-nephew); Sir Alfred Booth, 1st Baronet (great-great-nephew)

Henry Booth (4 April 1788 – 28 March 1869) was a British corn merchant, businessman and engineer, known especially for pioneering the construction and management of the Liverpool & Manchester Railway (L&M), the world's first steam locomotive rail transportation of both passengers and freight.

== Biography ==
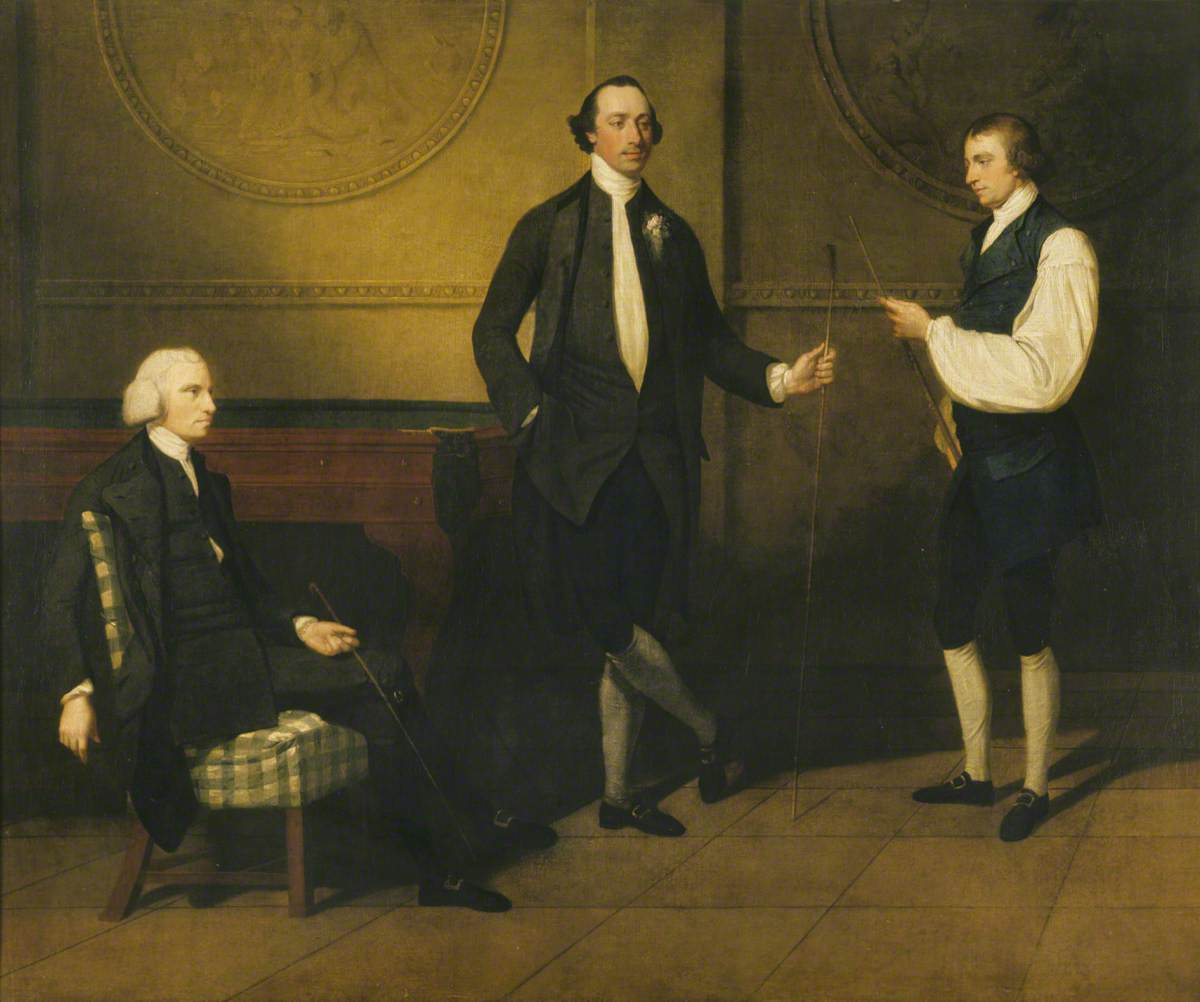
Billiards at the Booth family seat, Twemlow Hall, Cheshire circa 1770

Born in 1788 on Rodney Street, Liverpool, his father Thomas Booth (1749–1832) was the fifth son of Henry Booth (1715–1787), a yeoman farmer of Orford, Lancashire, and great-nephew of the Revd Dr Charles Everard, Rector of Brereton and Mary née Booth (1693–1787), of Twemlow, Cheshire.

Thomas and his younger brother George Booth apprenticed to corn merchant Dobson in 1767, and c. 1774 began business as corn factors on their own account at 17 King Street, Liverpool. As eldest son, it was expected Henry would follow his father in the business and he was sent to Dr. Shepherd, a Presbyterian minister in the nearby Lancashire village of Gateacre for instruction. He showed an aptitude for reading books, poetry, practical mechanics and was noted for a good eye for proportion. Booth initially found employment in his father's business, noted for not being particularly successful, before branching out with his own corn merchant business.

... the five young men who, beyond all others, helped to set the Age of Steam firmly on its way. The five men were: George Stephenson's own son Robert; two of his pupils, Joseph Locke and John Dixon, Timothy Hackworth, the locomotive superintendent of the Stockton & Darlington Railway; and Henry Booth

— Nock, O. S.

Booth coat of arms

=== 1820–1830 building the railway ===
His father Thomas Booth had been an original member of the L&M project original provisional committee in 1822. Henry later replaced his father and quickly became noted for organisational and promotional skills and enthusiasm for the endeavour which was to an extent stalling by 1823 and least in part due to the difficulties and over-commitment of William James. Appointed as Committee Secretary noted as second only to fellow corn merchant, Joseph Saunders, in commitment to the project Booth was one of the four members of a working party sent to visit other railways at Bedlington Ironworks, Killingworth and Hetton Collieries, returning with a report recommending steam locomotive haulage for the L&M. A meeting of 20 May 1824 accepted the report but also took the steps to forming a joint-stock company, Booth writing the prospectus which was issued on 29 October 1824.

1825 saw Booth give up his corn merchant interests to concentrate on the L&M project. The initial Enabling Bill for the L&M presented to Parliament was defeated in 1825, with George Stephenson under-performing. Stephenson was more of a self-taught rather than formally trained civil engineer and his situation was not helped by some of his subordinate engineers who had made significant errors in the submission became apparent. While Booth requested no scapegoats to be made, one of Stephenson's engineers committed suicide.

The L&M used the Rennie brothers for a further submission to build the railway in 1826. The revised presentation focused on the use of stationary engines with mobile locomotives only to be considered if their technology improved. With focus away from locomotives and the pro-stationary engine and the Rennies involved, the Enabling Bill emerged from committee stage in late March, passing the House of Commons in early April, then the Lords and received Royal Assent in early May 1826. With the Bill enacted, Booth, Saunders and other pro-locomotive directors recalled Stephenson to build the railway, much to the Rennies' chagrin.

On 29 May 1826 following the successful Liverpool & Manchester Railway Enabling Act, at a meeting of subscribers Booth was appointed Treasurer with a salary of £500 a year, and continued to fulfil the posts of Treasurer, Secretary and later General Manager of the L&MR. (Note: For practical purposes nowadays the Company Treasurer would take on those functions now for the Chief Executive Officer)

=== Rainhill and Rocket ===
As the building of the railway continued toward conclusion the board was split as whether to use stationary engines or mobile locomotives particularly over the significant inclines around Rainhill, Lancashire. Booth was in favour of locomotive haulage; however locomotives being built were mostly orientated towards freight haulage to and from mines and not for higher speed passenger work. The single flue design used by locomotives was one of the constraints to raising steam due to the limited heating surface between the hot tubes and water in the boiler. That this was understood was indicated by the reverse flue in Hawkworth's Royal George, the most powerful locomotive of the time, which reversed the main flue. Booth and the L&MR board initially gave the Stephensons £100 to experiment with a multi-tube boiler, however the result was not successful. Lancashire Witch, which was initially to have had a multi-tube boiler eventually emerged with a single main flue and two subsidiary flues.

On 20 April 1829 the board of the Liverpool & Manchester Railway project passed a resolution for a competition to be held to prove their railway could be reliably operated by steam locomotives, there being advice from eminent engineers of the age that stationary engines would be required. A prize of £500 was offered as an incentive to the winner, with strict conditions a locomotive would need to meet to enter the trial. Booth and the Stephensons partnered to produce a premium engine with a multi-tube boiler that was to become Stephenson's Rocket and which was to win the Rainhill Trials in October 1829.

There are suggestions it was Booth who proposed the basic design of the first multi-tubular boiler as used on the Rocket, built in late 1829 for the L&M Railway. The first record of Booth first referring to "method of producing steam without smoke", or multi-tube boiler, occurs in the minutes of a L&MR board meeting in spring 1827. French entrepreneur Marc Seguin also claimed the invention as his.

=== 1831–1845 Liverpool & Manchester operations ===
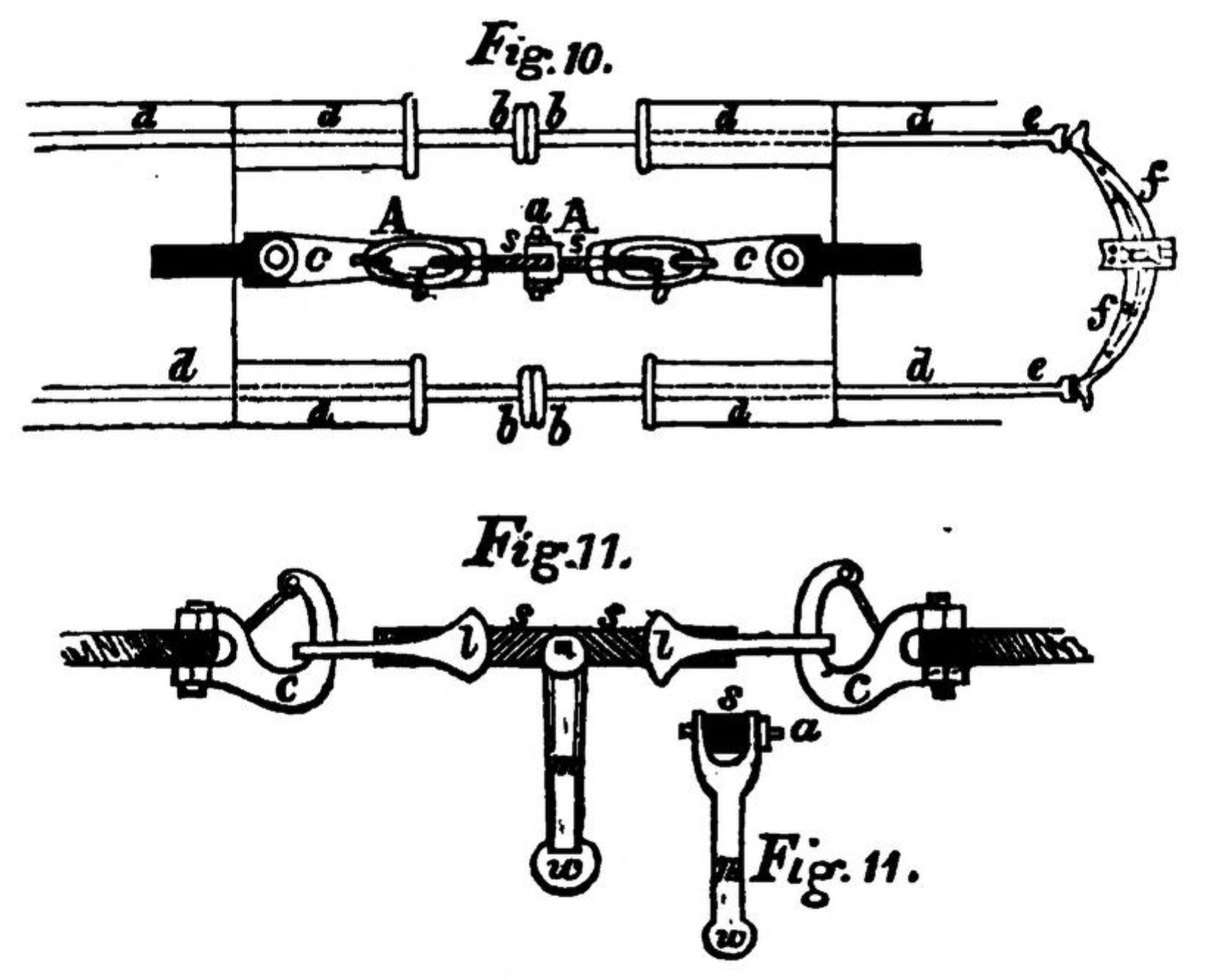
Booth's screw-link coupling design

Booth was the Company Treasurer of the L&MR for all 15 years of its operating life, the railway taking over from the Stockton & Darlington as the model to follow. Challenges arose needing to be overcome, especially in the early pioneering years, and Booth's contributions to the railway continued to be recognised with his salary being increased from £750 to £1,000 in 1834 and four years later to £1,500. Although Treasurer, (Note: Booth was one of many in the company to bring forth suggestions and inventions.) Booth made some technical contributions to the railway including lubrication of certain parts of locomotives using grease rather than oil. Booth is also connected with the use of buffers for the coach rolling stock, even having to account to parliament on the matter in 1832 and introducing and devised an arrangement with an additional set of springs with double hanging shackles for first-class coaches. (Note: The earliest L&M coaches were connected with chains then replaced by springs in 1831 ... there was severe jolting on setting off and see-sawing in motion)

Booth was a leading proponent of working all British railways to one standard time.

=== After the LNWR merger ===
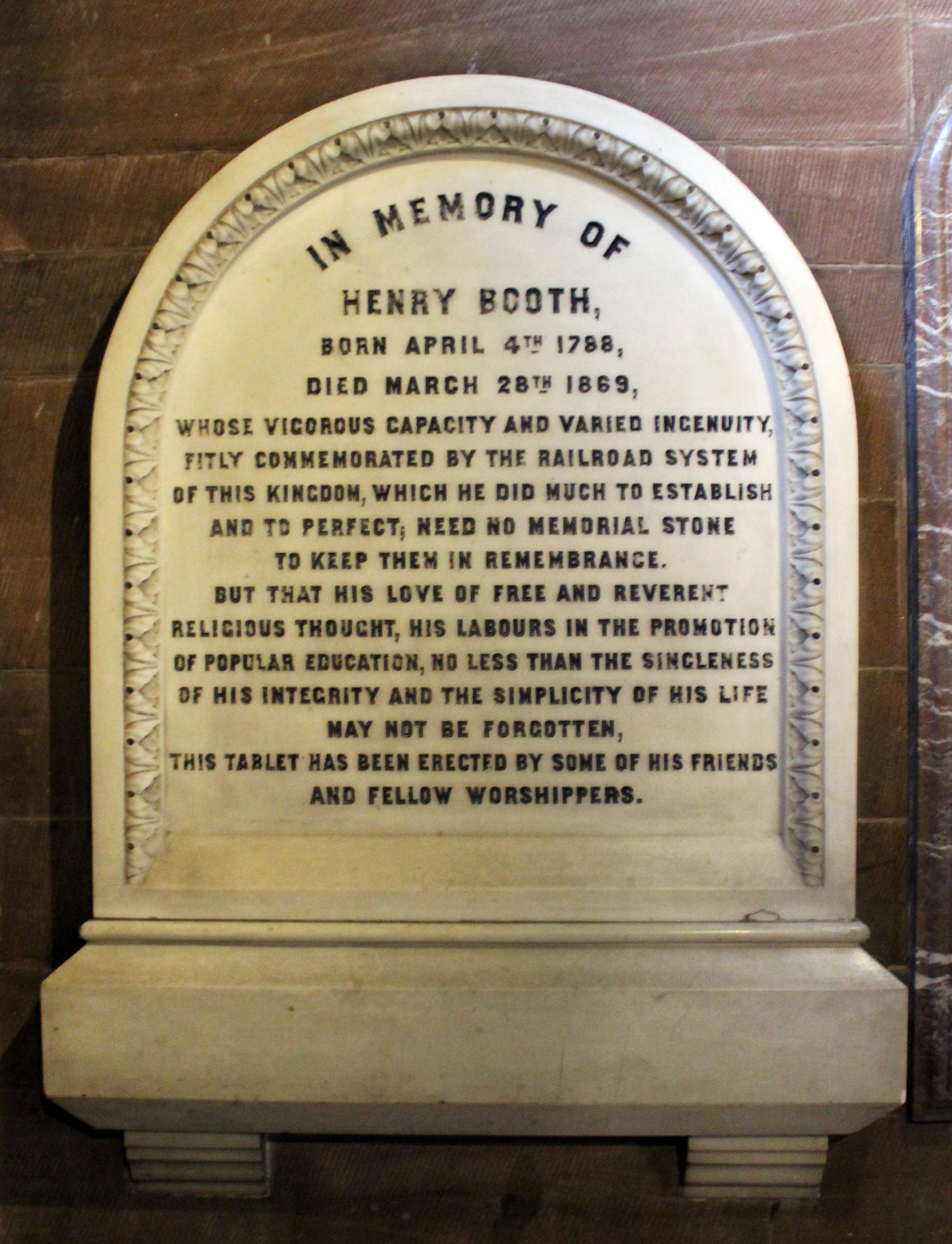
Memorial tablet to Henry Booth in Ullet Road Church, Liverpool.

On the formation of the London & North Western Railway (LNWR) on 16 July 1846, he became a director of the new large company, serving until 18 May 1859. He also served as the company secretary for the LNWR's Northern Division for a year, being the first person to do so.

== Inventions ==
Booth is credited with the invention of the screw coupling; there is a statue of him holding one at St George's Hall, Liverpool, and a bust of him at the Science Museum, London.

== See also ==
- Booth baronets
