= 0-2-2 =

Locomotive wheel arrangement

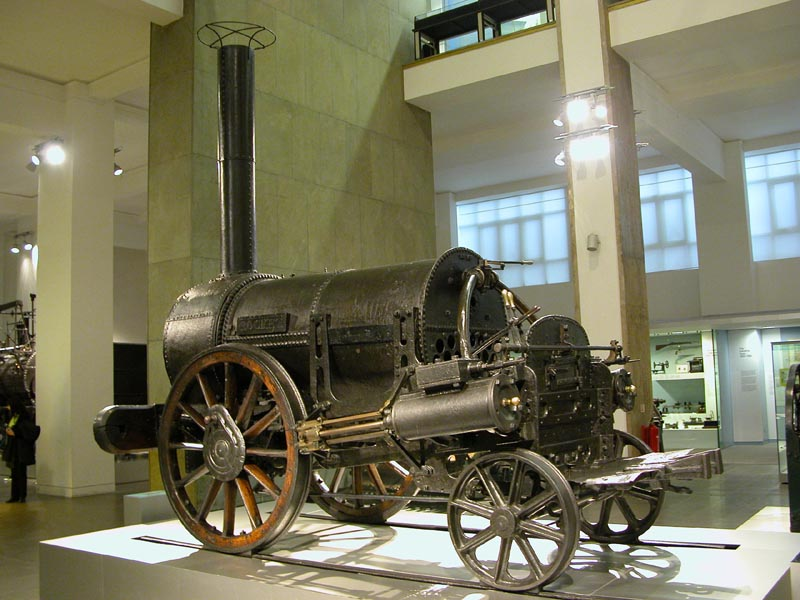
Stephenson's Rocket, the first 0-2-2 locomotive. This is the condition after rebuilding, with the cylinders lowered from their original position

An 0-2-2, in the Whyte notation for the classification of steam locomotives by wheel arrangement, is one that has no leading wheels, followed by two coupled driving wheels, with two trailing wheels. The configuration was briefly built by Robert Stephenson and Company for the Liverpool and Manchester Railway.

== Equivalent classifications ==
Other equivalent classifications are:

- UIC classification: A1 (also known as German classification and Italian classification)
- French classification: 011
- Turkish classification: 12
- Swiss classification: 1/2

== Liverpool & Manchester Railway ==
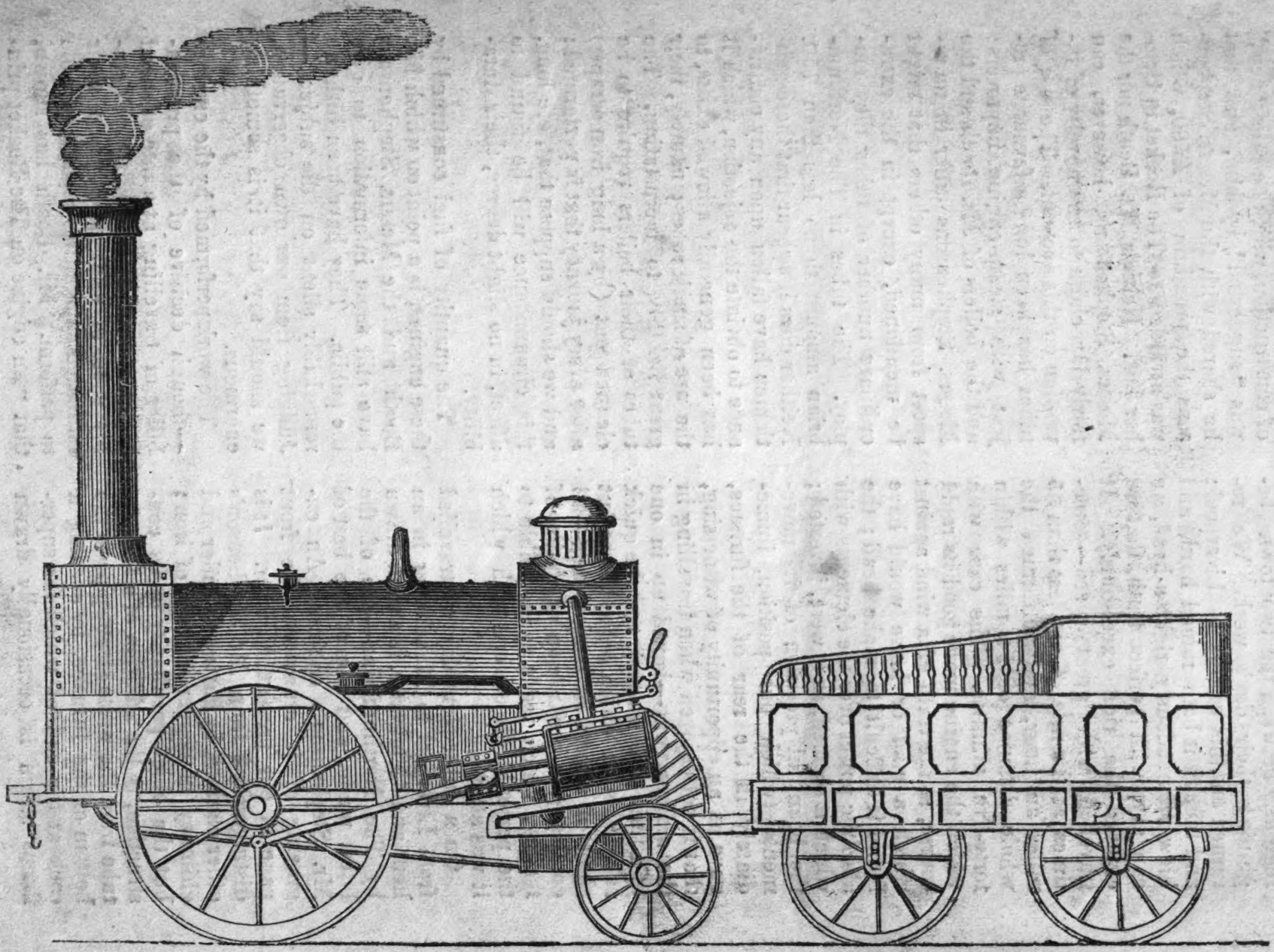
Locomotive Northumbrian as depicted in the October 16, 1830 issue of Mechanics' Magazine.

=== Rocket ===
The 0-2-2 or Northumbrian wheel arrangement was first used for Stephenson's Rocket, their entry for the Rainhill Trials of 1829, a competition to choose a locomotive design for the new Liverpool and Manchester Railway. Stephenson recognised that the rules of the competition favoured a fast, light locomotive of only moderate hauling power. Although George Stephenson's previous designs had been heavy four-coupled freight locomotives, Rocket was almost entirely new. Stephenson was an advocate of the adhesion railway, against the fashion of the time, and believed that the light loads for Rainhill would even allow just a single driving axle. This allowed the simplification of not requiring either a chain drive between the axles or Stephenson's invention of the external coupling rods.

Achieving adequate traction required more of Rocket's weight to be over the driving axle than the carrying axle. The heavy boiler was placed forwards, with the axle beneath it, giving a 0-2-2 layout rather than 2-2-0. The cylinders were set at a steep angle, as used the year before for Lancashire Witch, rather than the typical vertical cylinders of this period. The cylinders were thus over the firebox and both driver and fireman shared a footplate at the same, rear, end of the engine. Previously they had often been separated to their own ends of the engine.

=== Novelty ===
Ericsson and Braithwaite's entry for the Trials, their Novelty, was an 0-2-2 well tank locomotive. Both the driving wheels and trailing wheels were the same size, and there may also have been the facility to fit a coupling chain drive to give better adhesion "when needed". Novelty has also been described as a [2-2-0WT design, as there is no clear "front" or "rear" to this design.

=== Northumbrian ===
Rocket was the only locomotive to complete the trials successfully and Stephenson became the supplier of locomotives to the L&MR.

The 0-2-2 arrangement was subsequently used by Robert Stephenson and Company on eight locomotives supplied to the Liverpool and Manchester Railway after 1829:, Meteor, Comet, Dart, Arrow, Phoenix, North Star, Northumbrian, and Majestic. Like the rebuilt Rocket, these had their cylinders set low in a near-horizontal position.

The Northumbrian type was superseded by the 2-2-0 Planet type. These reversed the layout, placing the cylinders inside, between the frames, and below the smokebox at the front. The inside cylinders were closer together, giving less of a rocking couple and so were less prone to yawing oscillation at speed. Placing the cylinders below the smokebox also permitted shorter steampipes and exhaust pipes to the blastpipe, giving better efficiency. Northumbrians were the last, and only, production locomotives with this wheel arrangement.

After the Planets, most passenger locomotives began to use a 2-2-2 arrangement, with an additional front carrying axle to give better riding at speed.

== Tank engines ==
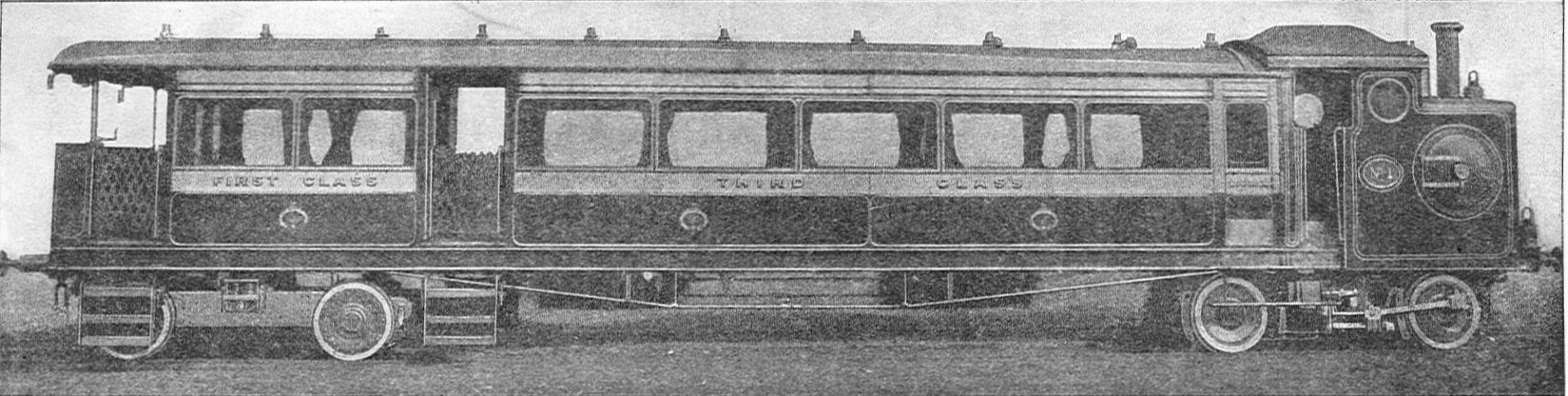
Railmotor with 0-2-2 locomotive unit c.1905

In the early 20th Century a number of railmotors were built by various railway companies in the UK where the locomotive section had an 0-2-2 wheel arrangement, but they were designed to operate semi-permanently coupled to a coach unit.

The LSWR C14 class used a similar layout, but reversed as a 2-2-0T. Their low adhesive weight gave them a poor performance and half of them were rebuilt as the 0-4-0T S14.

== Preserved examples and Replicas ==
Location	Address	Railroad	Road number/Name	Track gauge	builder	Year(s) built	Notes
National Railway Museum	York England	Brampton Railway	Rocket	4 ft 8 1/2 in (1,435 mm)	Robert Stephenson and Company	1829	was originally at the Science Museum, London now permanently at the National Railway Museum
Henry Ford Museum	Dearborn, Michigan US	Liverpool and Manchester Railway	Rocket	4 ft 8 1/2 in (1,435 mm)	Robert Stephenson and Company	1929	Replica
Museum of Science and Industry, Chicago	Chicago, Illinois US	Liverpool and Manchester Railway	Rocket	4 ft 8 1/2 in (1,435 mm)	R. & W. Hawthorn, Leslie and Company	1929	Replica
National Railway Museum	York England	Liverpool and Manchester Railway	Rocket	4 ft 8 1/2 in (1,435 mm)	Robert Stephenson and Company	1935	A cut away replica of Stephenson's Rocket located in the Great Hall at the National Railway Museum in York originally at the Science Museum, London on display with the original
National Railway Museum	York England	Liverpool and Manchester Railway	Rocket	4 ft 8 1/2 in (1,435 mm)	Locomotion Enterprises	1979	a working replica of Stephenson's Rocket located in the Great Hall at the National Railway Museum in York
