= Northumbrian (locomotive) =

1830's British locomotive

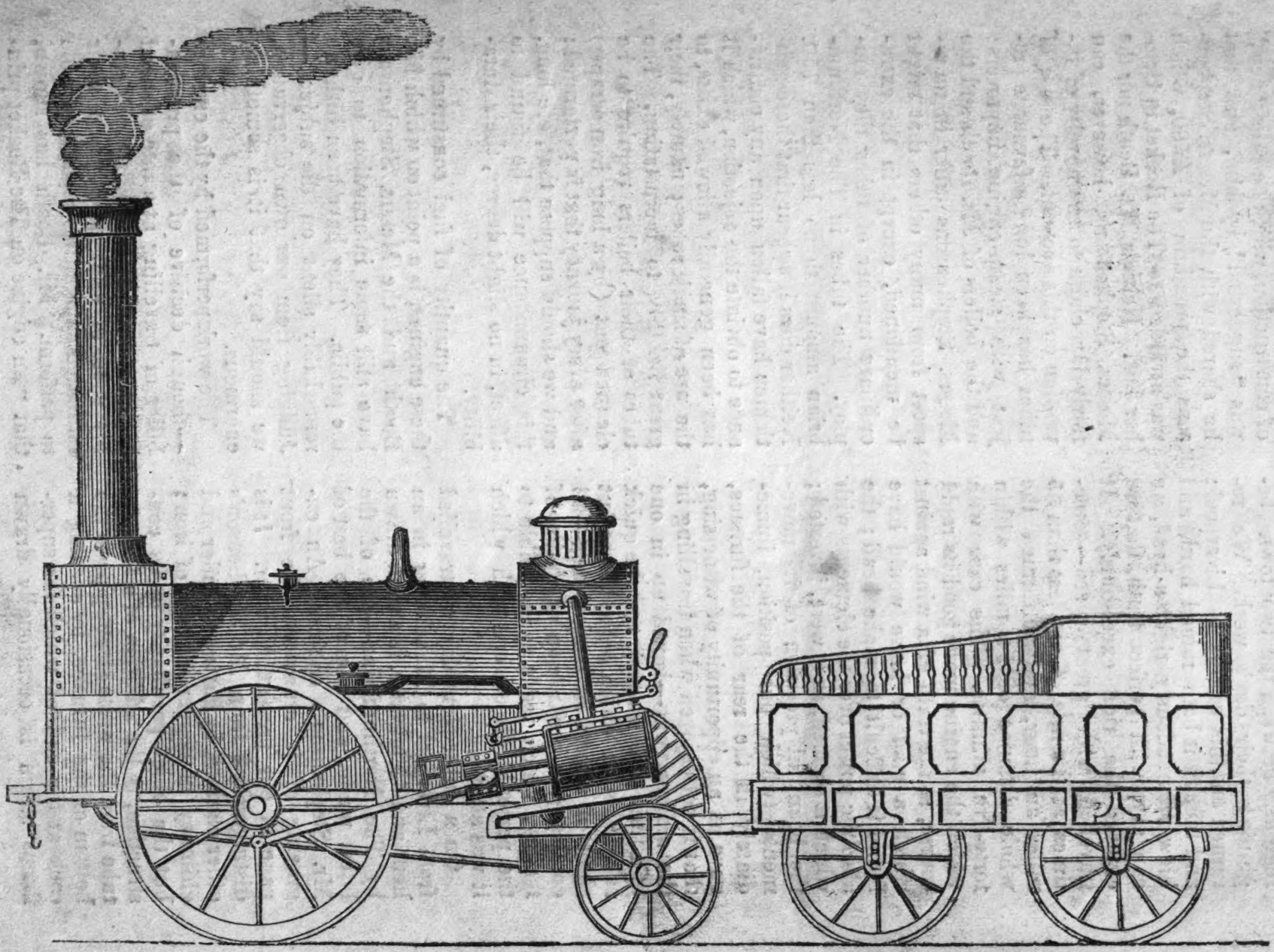
- Northumbrian as depicted in the October 16, 1830 issue of Mechanics' Magazine
Type and origin
- Power type: Steam
- Builder: Robert Stephenson and Company
- Build date: 1830
Specifications
- Configuration
  - Whyte: 0-2-2
- Gauge: 1,435 mm (4 ft 8 1/2 in)
- Driver dia.: 4 feet 4 inches (1.32 m)
- Axle load: 6,500 lb (2.95 t; 2.90 LT; 3.25 ST)
- Total weight: 25,500 lb (11.6 t; 11.4 LT; 12.8 ST)
- Fuel type: Coke
Career
- Operators: Liverpool and Manchester Railway

Northumbrian was an early steam locomotive built by Robert Stephenson in 1830 and used at the opening of the Liverpool and Manchester Railway (L&M). It was the eighth of Stephenson's nine 0-2-2 locomotives in the style of Rocket, but it introduced several innovations, which were also incorporated into Majestic, the last of the class.

== Design ==
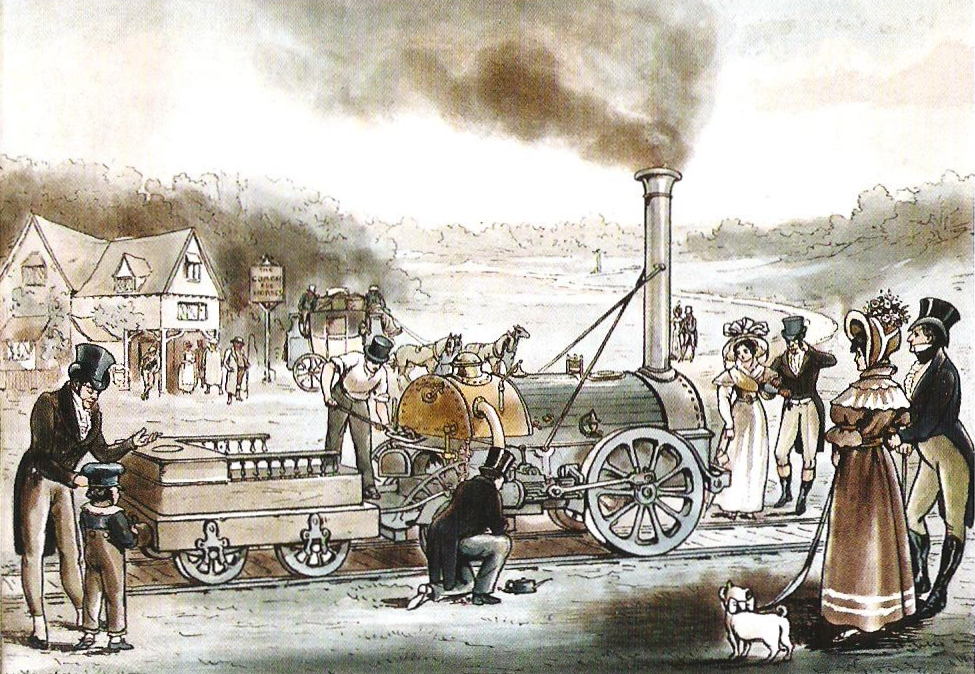
1894 lithograph illustration depicting Northumbrian

Northumbrian was the first 'locomotive' boiler that had both the firebox in a water jacket at one end and smokebox to collect ashes at the other. Dawson describes it as the first of a "modern" (steam locomotive) boiler while Hollingsworth notes virtually all successors followed this layout. Other features included plate frames, a proper tender, and the cylinders set at a relatively low angle to the horizontal, giving smoother running.

Northumbrian suffered from a number of poor design aspects. As the next iteration of locomotive development, one notable issue was while weight had increased from Rocket's 4 tons to over 7 tons, most of it was on the trailing wheels instead of the drivers. This led to adhesion problems and was partly why successor locomotive Planet was built as a 2-2-0 in the same year.

== Service ==
Northumbrian was handed over on 31 July 1830 at the price of £700, the cost being justified by more extensive use of copper and improved running characteristics. At the official opening ceremony of the L&M on 15 September 1830 with eight trains Northumbrian headed the first listed train with the Duke of Wellington as a prestige passenger and George Stephenson on the footplate. Northumbian was offered to the London and Birmingham Railway for £450 in 1836, this was refused and it is possible the locomotive was broken up.
