= Locomotive Seguin =

Seguin tubular steam locomotive (1829)

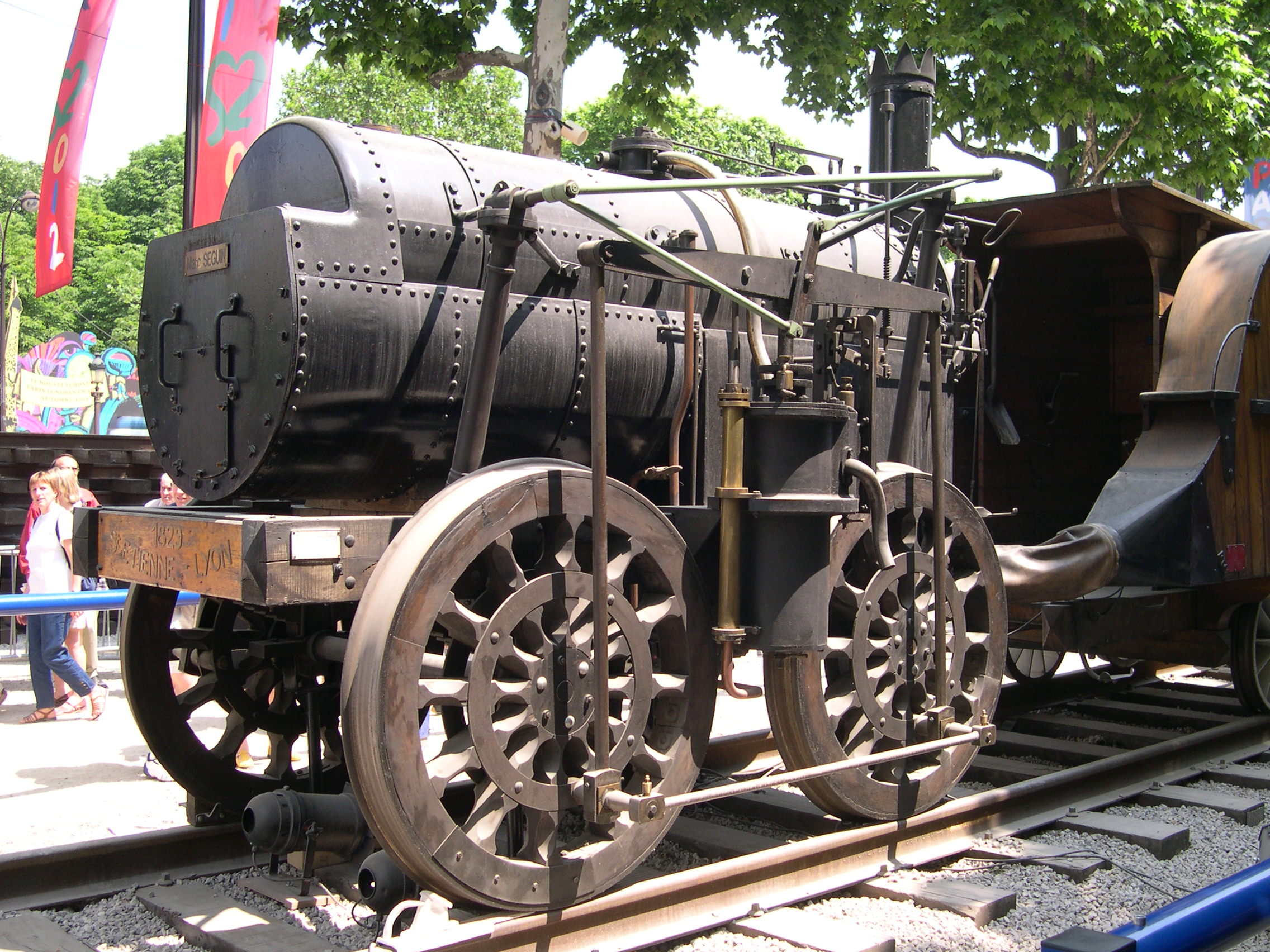
- Seguin locomotive replica
Type and origin
- Power type: Steam
- Builder: Marc Seguin
- Build date: 1829-1835
- Total produced: 12
Specifications
- Configuration
  - Whyte: 0-4-0
- Wheel diameter: 1,150 mm (3 ft 9 in)
- Loco weight: 4.5 t (4.4 long tons; 5.0 short tons)
- Boiler pressure: 0.4 MPa (58 psi)
- Cylinders: 2, vertical
Performance figures
- Maximum speed: 30 km/h (19 mph)
Career
- Operators: Saint-Étienne–Lyon railway
- Delivered: 1831
- First run: October 1st 1829
- Disposition: All scrapped, one replica built

Locomotive Seguin is the first steam locomotive to use a tubular boiler, a groundbreaking invention that multiplied the developed power by sixfold. Boiling is achieved by circulating the combustion gases in multiple 'fire tubes' passing through the heating body, significantly increasing the thermal exchange surface and efficiency. The boiler produced 1,200 kg (2,600 lb) of steam per hour instead of 300 kg (660 lb), enabling the locomotive to reach a speed of 30 km/h (19 mph) instead of 16 km/h (9.9 mph). Marc Seguin patented this invention on December 12, 1827, and it was initially applied to boats navigating the Rhône River. The Seguin locomotive was built in twelve iterations at the Perrache workshops between 1829 and 1835.

== History ==
The locomotive first ran on October 1, 1829, just a few days before George Stephenson's Rocket, with whom Marc Seguin maintained continuous communication. It was used on the second French railway line, connecting Saint-Étienne to Lyon from 1830 to 1832, where it started passenger service in 1831.

A replica of the locomotive was built between 1982 and 1987 by Gaston Monnier, a mechanical engineering professor at a technical high school in Paris and the founding president of ARPPI (Association for the Reconstruction and Preservation of Industrial Heritage).

== See also ==
- Marc Seguin
- Steam locomotive
- History of the steam engine
