= Novelty (locomotive) =

Early experimental locomotive

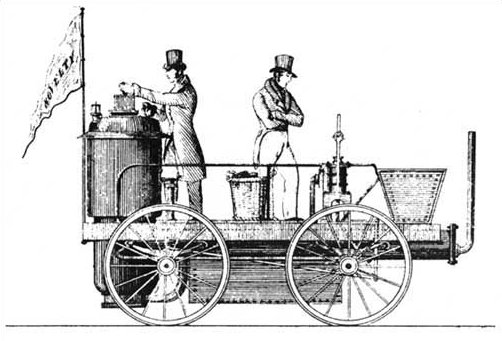
- Contemporary drawing of Novelty
Type and origin
- Power type: Steam
- Builder: John Ericsson and John Braithwaite
Specifications
- Configuration
  - Whyte: 0-2-2WT
- Loco weight: 2 long tons 3 cwt (4,800 lb or 2.2 t)
- Fuel type: coke
Career
- Operators: St Helens and Runcorn Gap Railway

Novelty was an early steam locomotive built by John Ericsson and John Braithwaite to take part in the Rainhill Trials in 1829.

It was an 0-2-2WT locomotive and is now regarded as the first tank engine. It had a unique design of boiler and a number of other novel design features (perhaps explaining the choice of name); however several major components had significant design weaknesses which ultimately resulted in its failure at the Trials.

== Novelty in the Rainhill Trials ==
=== Ericsson and Braithwaite Partnership ===
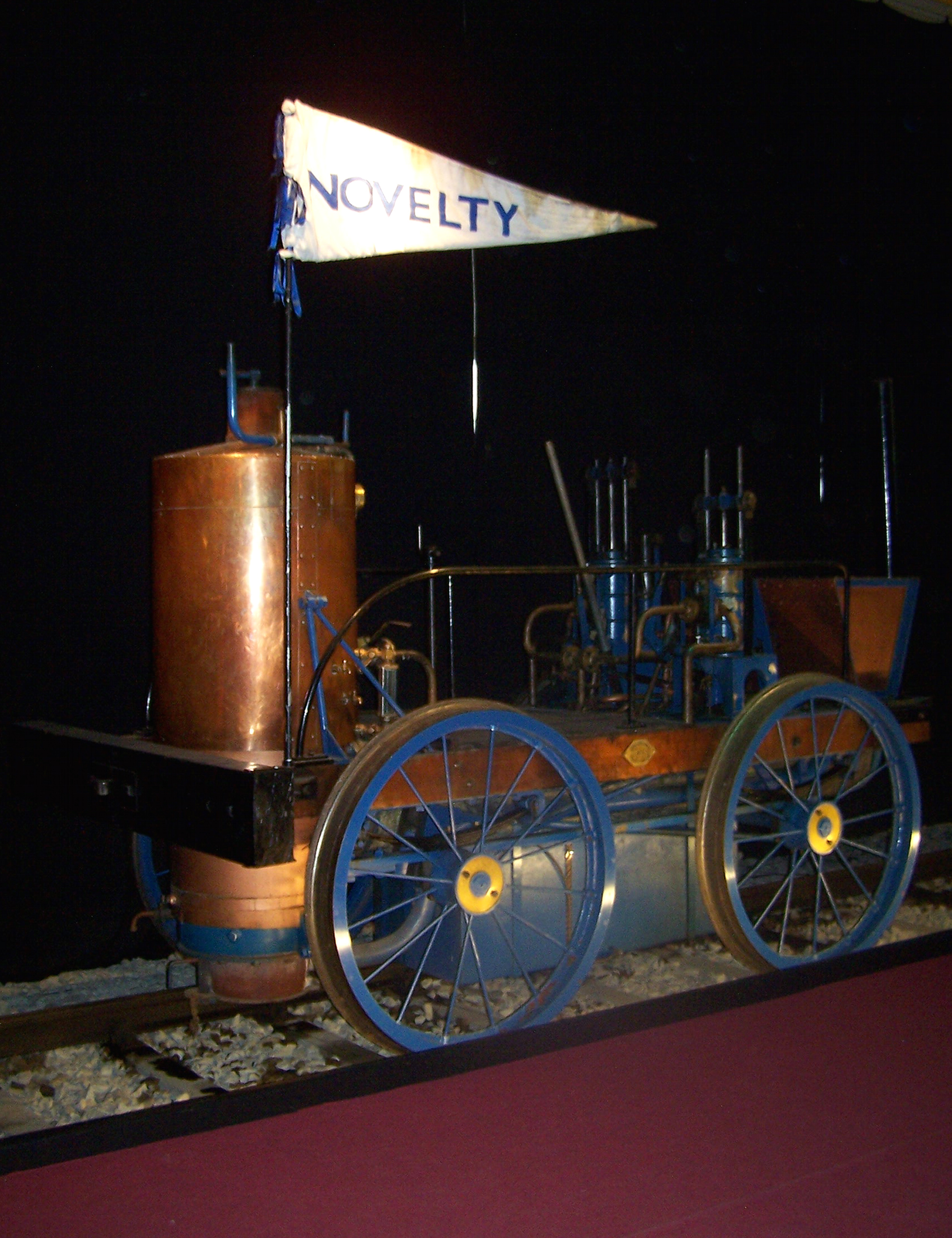
Replica of the Novelty in the Transport Museum in Nuremberg during the exhibition "Adler, Rocket and Co."

During the late 1820s Ericsson and Braithwaite were working together building horse drawn fire engines with steam pumps. These used a boiler designed by Ericsson and were built in the London works of John Braithwaite.

These fire engines were known for their ability to raise steam quickly and looked similar to Novelty.

Charles Vignoles has also been associated with Novelty, but his practical involvement is not known. He may have aligned himself with the engine because of a continuing feud with George Stephenson.

=== Building the engine ===
It is said that Ericsson and Braithwaite only found out about the Rainhill Trials seven weeks before the event was due to take place, when Ericsson received a letter from a friend referring to a "Steam Race". This incredibly short space of time has led people to suggest that Novelty is in fact a converted fire engine. It is more likely that it used a number of the same parts as their fire engines and these parts may even have been built for an existing order and diverted to Novelty.

Novelty was constructed in the London Workshop belonging to Braithwaite and transported to Liverpool by boat. There was no time to test Novelty in London before transportation, and following test runs at Rainhill before the trials, modifications were carried out with the help of Timothy Hackworth.

=== The boiler ===
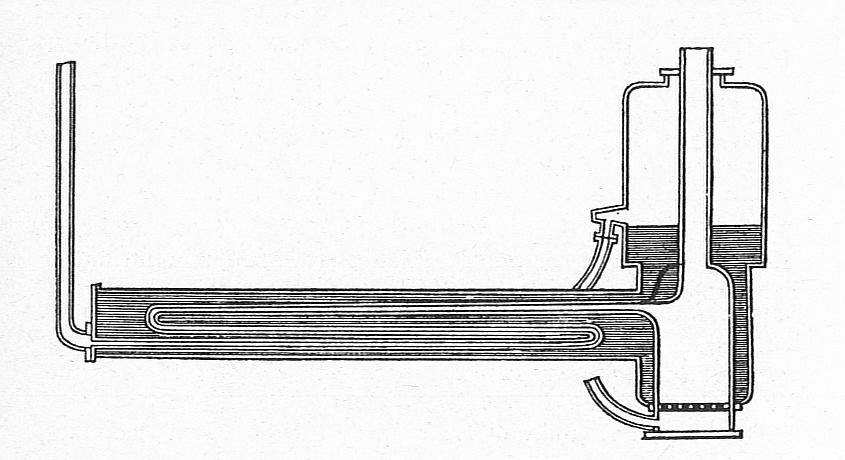
Section through the boiler, firebox to the right

The boiler used on Novelty was designed by John Ericsson. The design was scientific for the era but proved to be hard to build and maintain compared with the boiler design adopted for Rocket and most steam locomotives since.

The most prominent feature for the boiler is the vertical copper firebox (the large vessel to the right in the illustration here). Within the vertical vessel was the inner firebox and the space between the two was filled with water (to a level just about the same as the driver’s ankle). (Coke) fuel was added from the top, where a tube passed down through the top of the firebox. This firebox construction was not dissimilar to some types of vertical boiler, but this was only part of Ericsson’s design.

Like George Stephenson, Ericsson understood that a large area was needed to extract heat from the hot gases. This he did in a long horizontal tube filled with water which ran under the full length of the engine. It can be seen in the illustration on top of this page, sticking out to the right, with the vertical chimney attached to it. Within the horizontal section was a tube carrying the hot gases, this formed an ‘S’ shape so the gases made three passes through the water. This S-shaped tube was also tapered causing the gases to speed up as they cooled down. In practice this tube is almost impossible to clean.

The resulting boiler was the shape of a hammer and was required to be fitted to the frame before the footplate, cylinders or blower could be added.

The boiler used a ‘Forced Draught’ provided by a mechanical blower (the triangular structure on the right in the illustration). This forced air along a pipe and into the sealed ashpan (below the fire). Few steam locomotives have ever used a forced draught like this, the main reason is that in order to add fuel either the draft must be stopped or some form of airlock fitted. Novelty used an airlock to feed the fuel in, but there was still a chance of flame and hot gases being blown into the face of the fireman.

The blower was driven from the rods linking the cylinders to the wheels, thus the draught was proportional to the speed of the engine, not to how hard it is working as with a blastpipe. It is assumed that either the blower was worked by hand when the engine was standing or the drive wheels were lifted off the rails. Details of the blower design are not known for certain.

Water was forced into the boiler using a pump driven off one of the cylinders (this was normal practice at the time).

=== Drive to the wheels ===
At this time, engineers were worried about uneven wear on pistons and cylinders when they were mounted horizontally, so most were mounted vertically, but vertical cylinders driving directly on the wheels (as on Sans Pareil) caused problems with poor riding and did not work well with the springs.

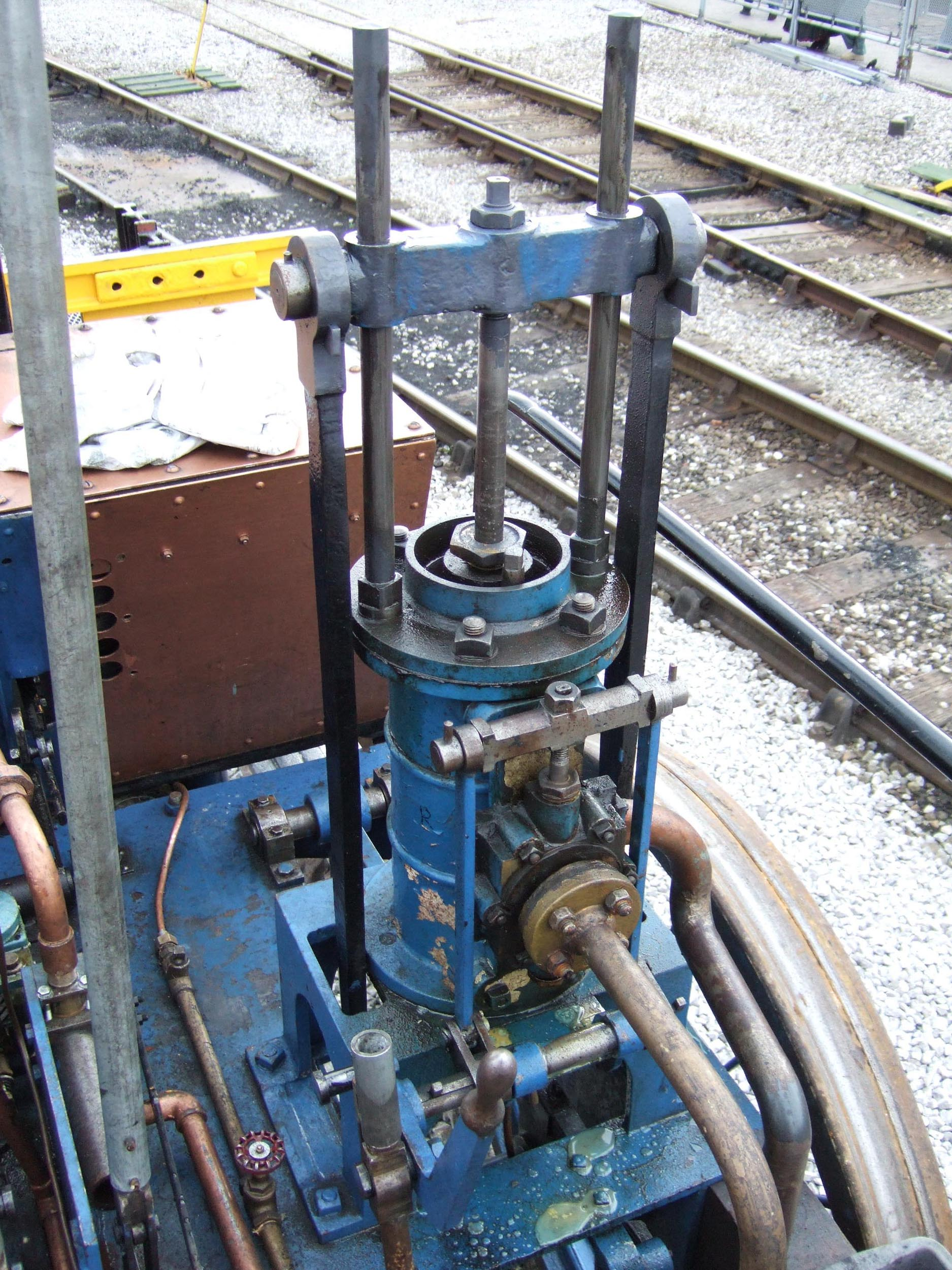
Cylinder on replica of Novelty

On Novelty, the cylinders were mounted vertically towards the rear of the engine (to the right of the men in the illustration). Directly below were bell cranks which changed the drive to horizontal. Connecting rods linked the bell cranks to the crank axle (the axle on the left in the illustration).

The valve gear took a similar route to the drive. One effect of this was it had multiple pins and links, resulting in lost motion. The wheels themselves were of the suspension type (similar to a bicycle wheel).

While Novelty appears to be an 0-4-0 locomotive as it had equal-sized wheels, it is actually an 0-2-2WT. Only the wheels under the firebox (those to the left on the illustration here) were driven, the other wheels were not normally connected to the drive, although they could be coupled by a chain 'when necessary'.

=== The first tank locomotive ===
Novelty was the first tank locomotive as it carried its water in a well tank between its wheels.

As one of the rules for the Rainhill Trials related to the weight of the engine without a tender, a special allowance had to be made for Novelty.

=== Performance in the Trials ===
In the preparations for the trials, Novelty was shown to be lightweight and quick to raise steam.

Novelty was the crowd’s favourite to win the Trials. This may be because it looked like a steam carriage (which people associated with speed and improvements in transport) or possibly because it did not look like a typical colliery engine of the time. In the demonstration runs that took place on the first day of the trials, Novelty managed a high speed of around 28 miles per hour (45 km/h)

Novelty was the first locomotive to be tested. Starting on the second day of the trials, it began the planned series of runs but quickly the blower failed and repairs had to be made. The repairs took up all of the next day. However, when Novelty next ran the water feed pipe burst and more repairs had to be made, which seem to have included a seal on the boiler. At the time, the boilers were sealed with a cement-like substance which required days - if not weeks - to set properly. Time would not allow this and the seal quickly failed once the trial runs were restarted. The recurring boiler problems prompted Ericsson and Braithwaite to withdraw from the Trials.

Before it failed, the Stephensons were said to be seriously worried by Novelty, as it was well-suited to meet the conditions of the trial. For one thing the Stephensons considered the weight to be pulled to be too light for a practical railway.

== After the Rainhill Trials ==
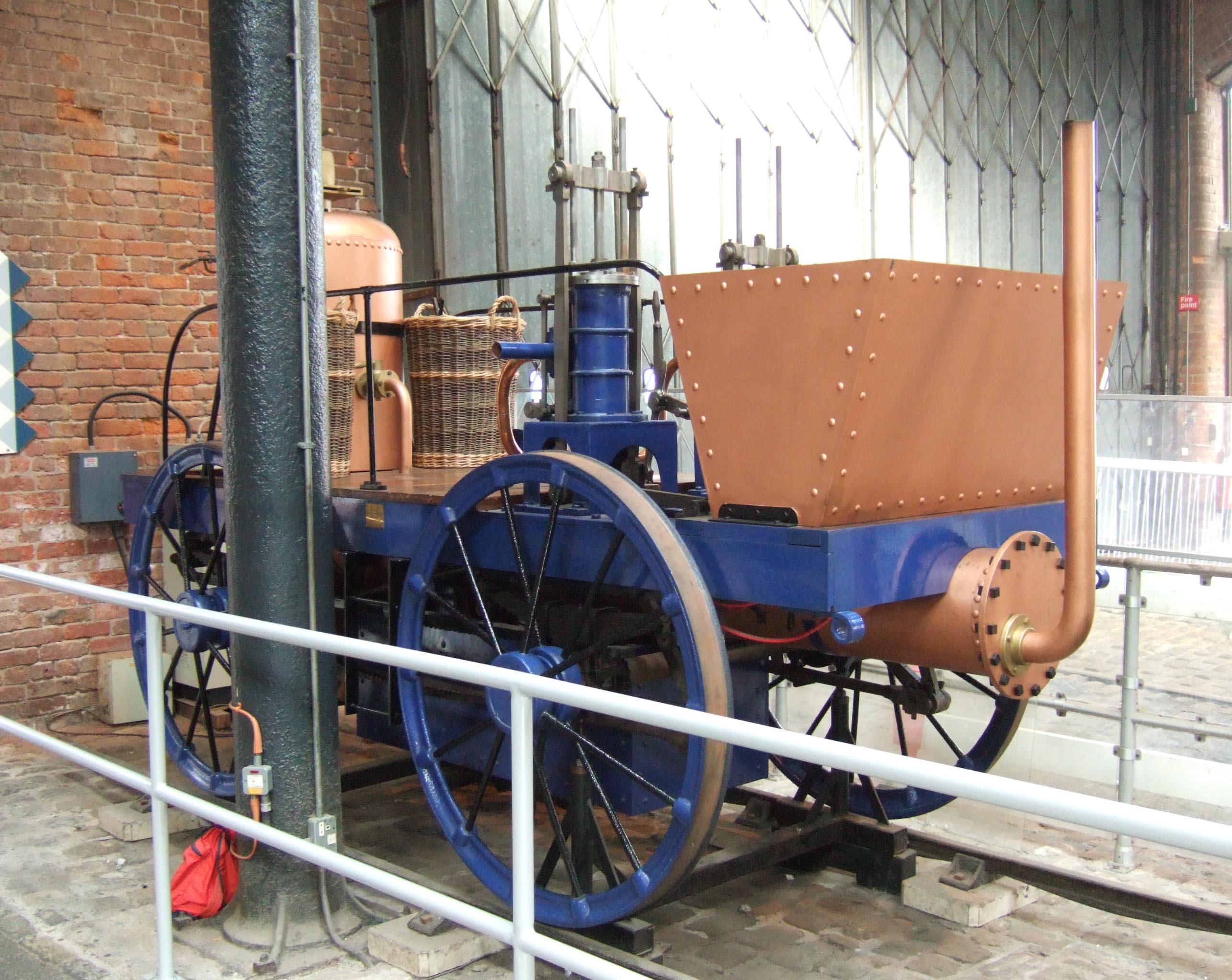
Full-size model that includes parts from the original Novelty

Once all the repairs were completed, Novelty made a number of successful demonstration runs but it was too late to have any effect on the competition. It is sometimes claimed that one of these demonstration runs included the locomotive reaching a speed of over 60 miles per hour (97 km/h), but there is little to support this and it may be a misinterpretation of a newspaper report trying to give an impression of the speeds that the Rainhill engines were achieving.

Two further engines were built by Ericsson and Braithwaite named William IV and Queen Adelaide. These were generally larger and more robust than Novelty and differed in several details (for example, it is thought that a different design of blower was used which was an ‘Induced Draught’ type, sucking the gases from the fire). The pair ran trials on the Liverpool and Manchester Railway but the railway declined to purchase the new designs.

Novelty was transferred to the St Helens and Runcorn Gap Railway and worked there for a few years. During its time there (around 1833) it received new cylinders and a new boiler. Somehow, all the wheels and both cylinders (assumed to be the original one not those from the 1833 rebuild) survived to preservation.

During 1929 the original wheels and one cylinder were incorporated into a full-scale, non-working model that is now on display in the Manchester Museum of Science and Industry. This early replica was rebuilt in 1988 and currently includes batteries and an electric motor to allow it to move (all wheels are driven making the engine a 4wBE), although the steam components are non-functional. The other cylinder is on display at Rainhill Public Library.

No other British locomotives are known to have been built in this style. Comparisons are made with 20th-century vertical-boiler engines, such as those by Sentinel of Shrewsbury, but the principles were different.

== The replica ==
For the Rocket 150 event in 1980, a completely new replica of Novelty was constructed by Locomotion Enterprises in the Springwell Workshop of the Bowes Railway. It was a fully working replica that was built to look correct when display at the planned event. However, multiple changes were made to reduce the construction costs and meet modern standards. It has been suggested that the replica was built to last no longer than the three days of the Rocket 150 event.

Some of the differences between the original and replica are:

- Carbon steel used instead of wrought iron

Wrought iron was no longer commercially produced, while carbon steel was understood by every commercial fabricator.

- Boiler built from welded steel instead of copper

A copper boiler would have been expensive in materials and would have needed specialist skills while welded steel had much in common with industrial pressure vessels.

- Blower built from plywood and painted copper colour

The blower is likely to have been the subject of development work, plywood being much cheaper and easier to work with. Additionally few people would get close enough to tell the difference.

- Handbrake fitted to act on both wheels

This may have been fitted after the ‘Rocket 150’ event.

- Boiler fitted with gauge glass and Bourdon pressure gauge

Requirements for any steam boiler, vital if the engine was to be operated safely.

- Safety valve is "pop" type rather than "dead weight"

Firstly the pop valves were a type used in industry; secondly the dead-weight type could be held down (so it would never work properly); and thirdly a dead-weight valve tends to bounce and thus waste steam.

- A larger boiler containing approximately twice the volume of water

This is mainly as a result of the construction methods used (flanged joints on the barrels and standard steel pipe for the flue tube). It is also gave bigger water spaces between the inside and outside plates. In consequence, the fire grate must have been considerably smaller than on the original.

For unknown reasons, the wheels of the replica were built with narrow treads. It is possible that wheels were scaled off a model in the London Science Museum. As a result, it was unable to travel over modern pointwork.

During the Rocket 150 event, Novelty was carried on a Well wagon, supported in such a way as to allow the engine to be run and its wheels to rotate freely.

Following the Rocket 150 event, Novelty was steamed on a small number of occasions in Manchester. Around 1982, it was sold to the Swedish Railway Museum, Gävle, and left the UK.

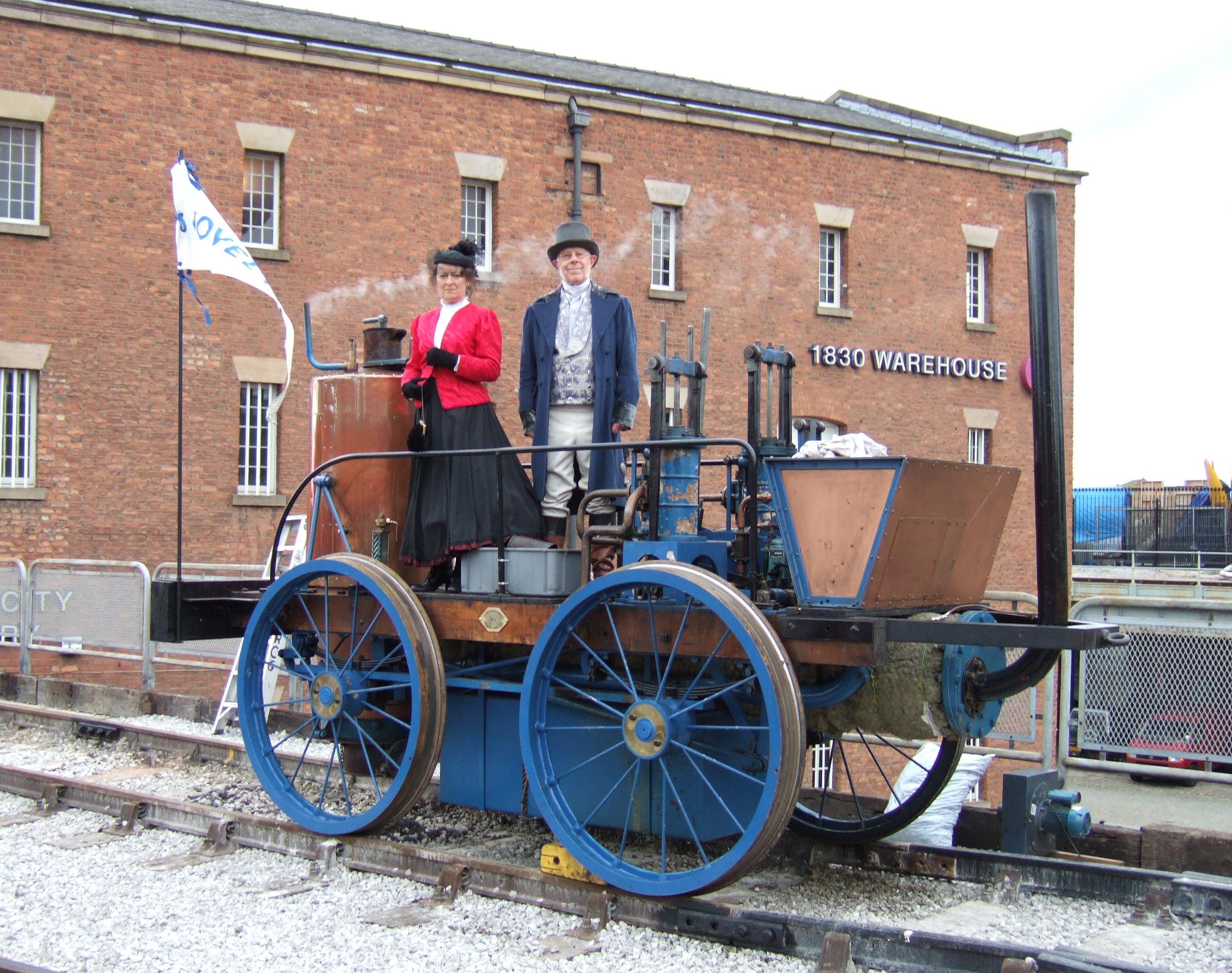
Replica of Novelty at Manchester, September 2005

During July 2002, Novelty was collected from its then home in the Ängelholm, for use in a TV programme. It was returned to Sweden during the spring of 2003, but made a short visit to the Museum of Science and Industry in Manchester during the autumn of 2005. It also made a short visit to the Nuremberg Transport Museum in 2010.

=== 2002 Restaging – The Television Programme ===
For the BBC TV programme Timewatch – Rocket and its Rivals the replica of Novelty was transported to the National Railway Museum in York. Here it was completely dismantled to allow examination of the boiler and working parts. Several items needed to be attended to before the locomotive could be run:

- Full boiler inspection for insurance purposes
- Minor boiler repairs
- Modifications to the wheels to allow safe operation on normal railways
- Cleaning and repainting of the water tank
- Releasing of several water valves that had seized
- Partial repaint

Of this work, the major item was the modification of the wheels. The solution adopted by the National Railway Museum Workshop was to employ a metal fabricator to cut four rings from 40 mm (1.6 in)-thick steel plate. These were cut with enough precision not to need any further machining. The rings were then bolted to the existing wheels and were a complete success.

Following re-assembly, the locomotive was steam tested at York before transport to Carrog station on the Llangollen Railway. Early tests showed up two major problems: firstly the linkage to the blower was not strong enough, and secondly operating the water feed pump caused serious priming of the boiler. It was later shown that the feed pump was five times the size of that required for the engine. This, causing air to be fed into the horizontal boiler tube, probably caused the priming.

To fully recreate the Rainhill Trials, 20 return runs along a section of the Llangollen Railway were required (between Carrog and Glyndyfrdwy stations). Novelty was only able to complete 10 runs before the fire became completely filled with clinker. The inability to clear clinker from the fire in this type of boiler was a major problem, the only way being to drop the fire completely and start again.

During the runs for the restaging of the trials Novelty was run with an electric fan (powered by a petrol generator) in place of the blower. Even allowing for this in the final calculation Novelty was much more efficient than Sans Pareil.

For the Restaging, the replica of Novelty was too slow to meet the requirements of the original trials and did not complete the course. The maximum speed attained at any point was 17 miles per hour (27 km/h), possibly because the main steam pipe from the boiler was restricting the flow to the cylinders.

With all the obvious differences between the original and the replica, added to the fact that the locomotive crew used had only four days experience of operating the locomotive, it cannot be said that in this restaging of the trial the replica gave the performance that the original could have achieved if more time had been made available in 1829.

== Other locomotives named Novelty ==
Excluding the original and the replicas, the following locomotives have carried the name Novelty:

- LNWR Newton Class No. 1682, built May 1868, replaced June 1892;
- LNWR Improved Precedent Class No. 1682, built June 1892, scrapped July 1928;
- LMS Royal Scot Class No. 6127, built 1927 (renamed in June 1936);
- LMS Jubilee Class No. 5733, built November 1936, withdrawn September 1964;
- British Rail Class 86, No. 86 235 (ex-E3194), built 1965, named to commemorate Rocket 150, (later renamed).
