= Marc Seguin =

French engineer and inventor

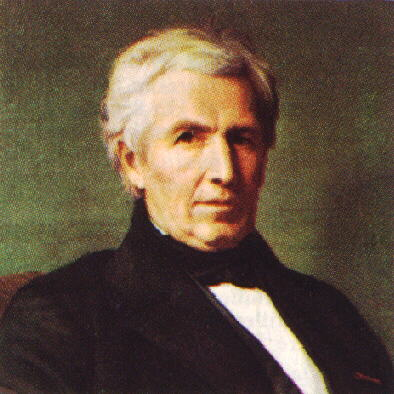
- Marc Seguin
- Born: 20 April 1786; Annonay
- Died: 24 February 1875 (aged 88); Annonay
- Education: Conservatoire national des arts et métiers
- Known for: suspension bridge, tubular steam-engine boiler
- Scientific career
- Fields: Inventor, Engineer

Marc Seguin (20 April 1786 – 24 February 1875) was a French engineer, inventor of the wire-cable suspension bridge and the multi-tubular steam-engine boiler.

== Early life ==
Seguin was born in Annonay, Ardèche to Marc François Seguin (1757–1832), the founder of Seguin & Co., and Thérèse-Augustine de Montgolfier (1764–1843), a niece of the pioneer hot air balloonist Joseph Montgolfier.

== Career ==
=== Bridges ===
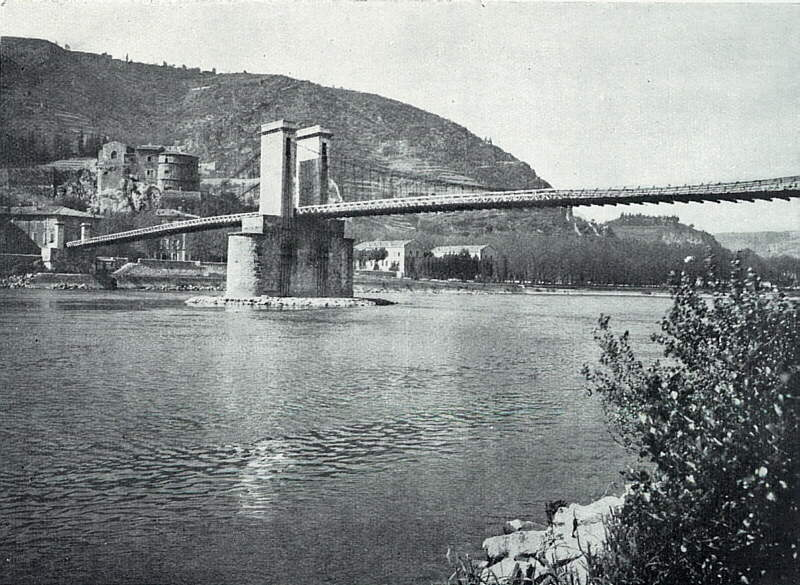
Marc Seguin suspension bridge near Annonay, 1825

Seguin was an inventor and entrepreneur who developed the first suspension bridge in continental Europe. He built and administered 186 toll-bridges throughout France. At the 1823 Exposition des produits de l'industrie française a model was exhibited of a planned suspension bridge which would span the Rhône from Tain-l'Hermitage to Tournon-sur-Rhône. The bridge, designed by Seguin, was completed in 1825.

=== Steam locomotives ===
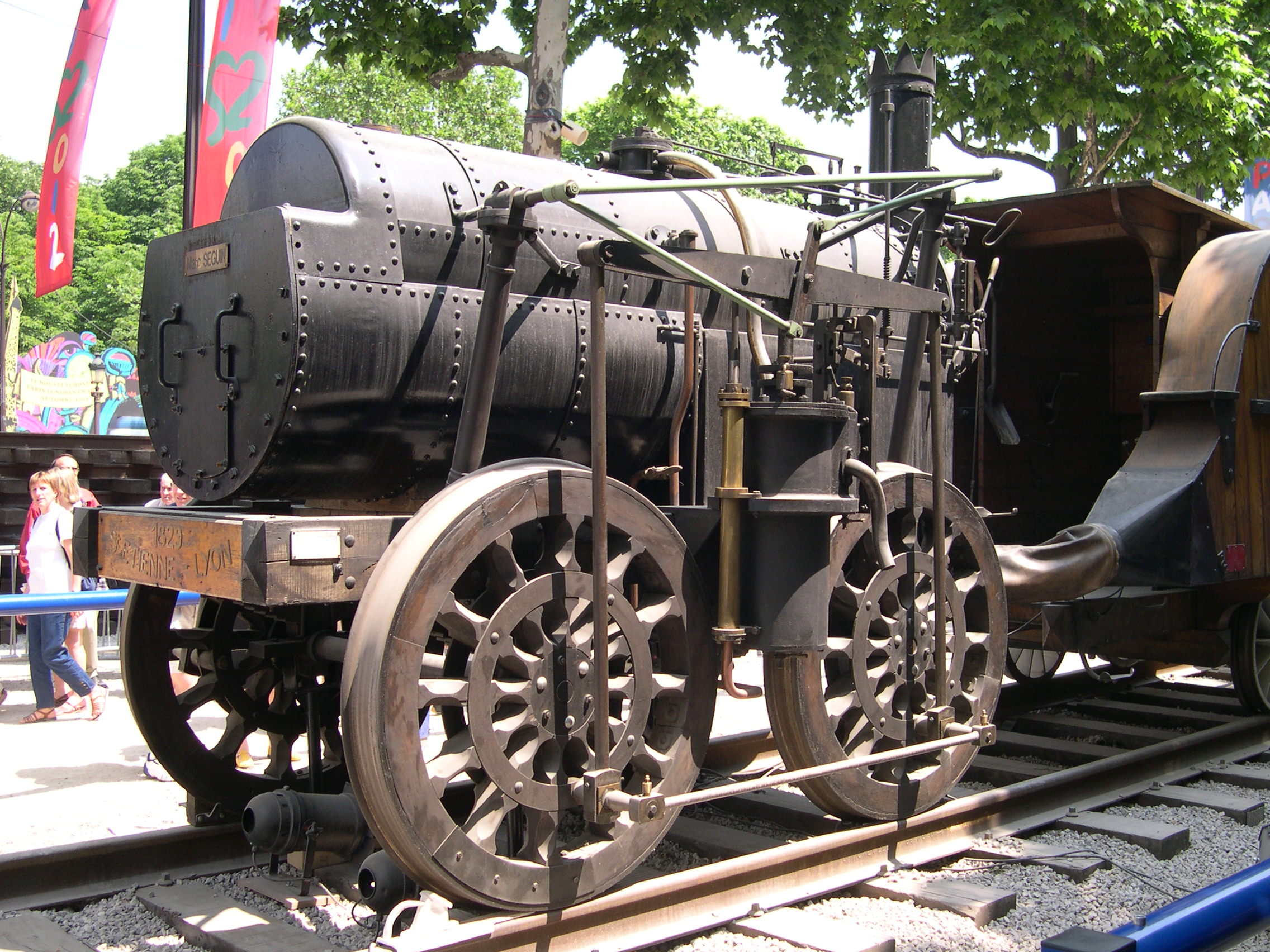
Replica of 1829 locomotive Marc Seguin at the Champs Elysées Expo Train Capitale, Paris, 2003.

Shortly after the Stockton and Darlington Railway in England opened (1825) he visited it and observed George Stephenson's Locomotion in operation and acquired two of his engines, which however proved unreliable in French conditions. In 1829, he delivered two steam locomotives of his own design to the Saint-Étienne–Lyon railway. These used an innovative multi-tube boiler and also prominent mechanically-driven fans to provide draught on the fire, rather than Stephenson's blastpipe. This boiler resembled the later Scotch marine boiler in some aspects, in that the boiler had a large single flue from the furnace, then many small-diameter fire-tubes returning to a chimney above the firebox door. Uniquely, Seguin's design also arranged the furnace in a large square water-jacketed firebox beneath the boiler to provide a large grate area and greater heating capacity. Robert Stephenson had also made the same decision with his Rocket, but placed his firebox separately and behind the main boiler shell. Seguin's boiler enabled steam-engine trains to increase power and velocity from 4 miles per hour to 25 miles per hour, making railroad a more viable mode of transportation.

=== Other businesses ===
Inventor and entrepreneur, teaming with his brothers, Camille, Jules, Paul and Charles, as well as his brother in law Vincent Mignot he continued his father's successful business in textiles, paper, gas-lighting, coal mines, construction and added to it a railroad company and a bridge construction business.

== Honours ==
Marc Seguin was voted into the Académie des Sciences in 1845, was made a Knight (Chevalier) of the Légion d'honneur in 1836 and an Officer in 1866, and wrote numerous books on the use of physics and mathematics in building bridges and locomotives engines. His name is one of the 72 names inscribed on the Eiffel Tower.

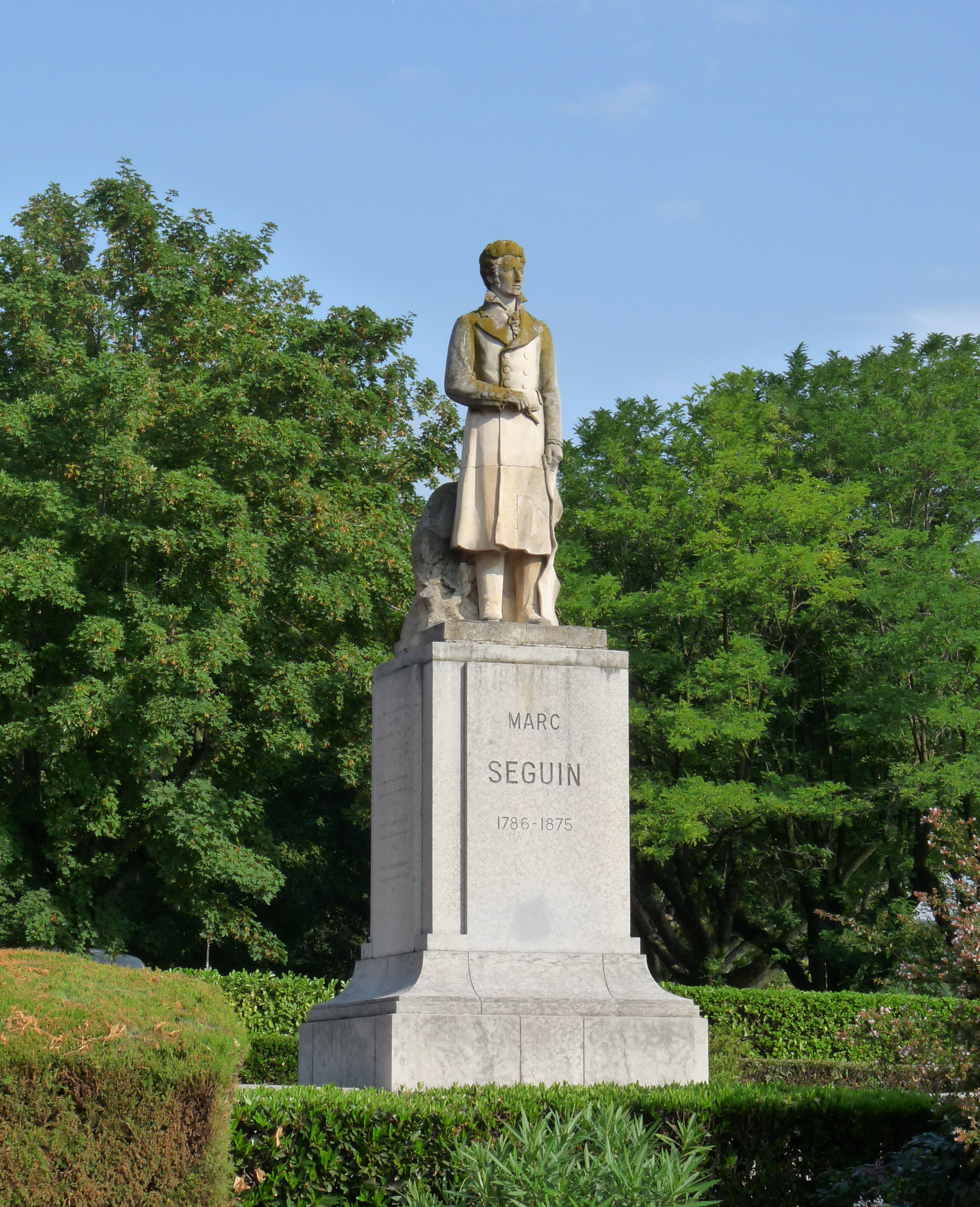
Statue of Marc Seguin in Tournon-sur-Rhône

== See also ==
- List of works by Eugène Guillaume
- Locomotive Seguin
