= Lancashire Witch =

Early 1828 British steam locomotive

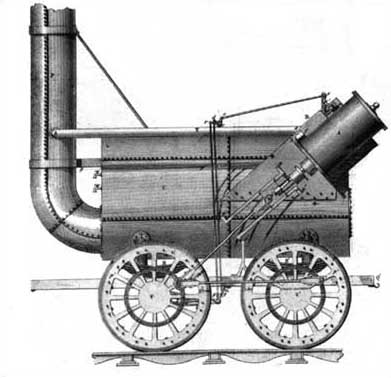
Type and origin
- Power type: Steam
- Designer: Robert Stephenson
- Builder: Robert Stephenson and Company
- Build date: 1828
Specifications
- Configuration
  - Whyte: 0-4-0
- Gauge: 4 ft 8 1/2 in (1,435 mm)
- Loco weight: 7 long tons (7,100 kg)
- Fuel type: coke
- Cylinders: 2
- Cylinder size: 9 in × 24 in (230 mm × 610 mm)
Performance figures
- Maximum speed: 8.8 miles per hour (14.2 km/h)
Career
- Operators: Bolton and Leigh Railway
- First run: June 1828

Lancashire Witch was an early steam locomotive built by Robert Stephenson and Company in Newcastle-upon-Tyne in 1828. It was a development of Locomotion.

== Description ==
Lancashire Witch was an 0-4-0 locomotive with rear mounted cylinders inclined at 45 degrees driving to the front wheels. The rear wheels were powered via coupling rods. The boiler had two flue tubes (Note: (Nock 1957, pp. 14–15) Indicates the design had flues bent at the end, with at least at one point having the design of a large central flue and two smaller side flues) and the locomotive burnt coke, aided by bellows on the tender. It was the first locomotive with steel springs. It was the first locomotive built by Robert Stephenson and Company.

== History ==
The locomotive that was to become Lancashire Witch was ordered by the board of the Liverpool and Manchester Railway (L&MR) in January 1828. The boiler was to incorporate a series a small flues, this evolved into a large central flue and two smaller side flues bent at the end. Four months after the order, the L&MR board transferred the locomotive to the Bolton and Leigh Railway (B&LR) (which opened in June 1828) where it was used as well as the L&MR. It was initially used to construct the B&LR, where it was shown hauling 58 long tons (59 t; 65 short tons) up a gradient of 1 in 432 (2.3‰ or 0.23%) at 8.8 miles per hour (14.2 km/h).

== Postage stamps ==
Lancashire Witch appeared on two postage stamps issued by Funafuti-Tuvalu on 24 December 1984.

== Other locomotives ==
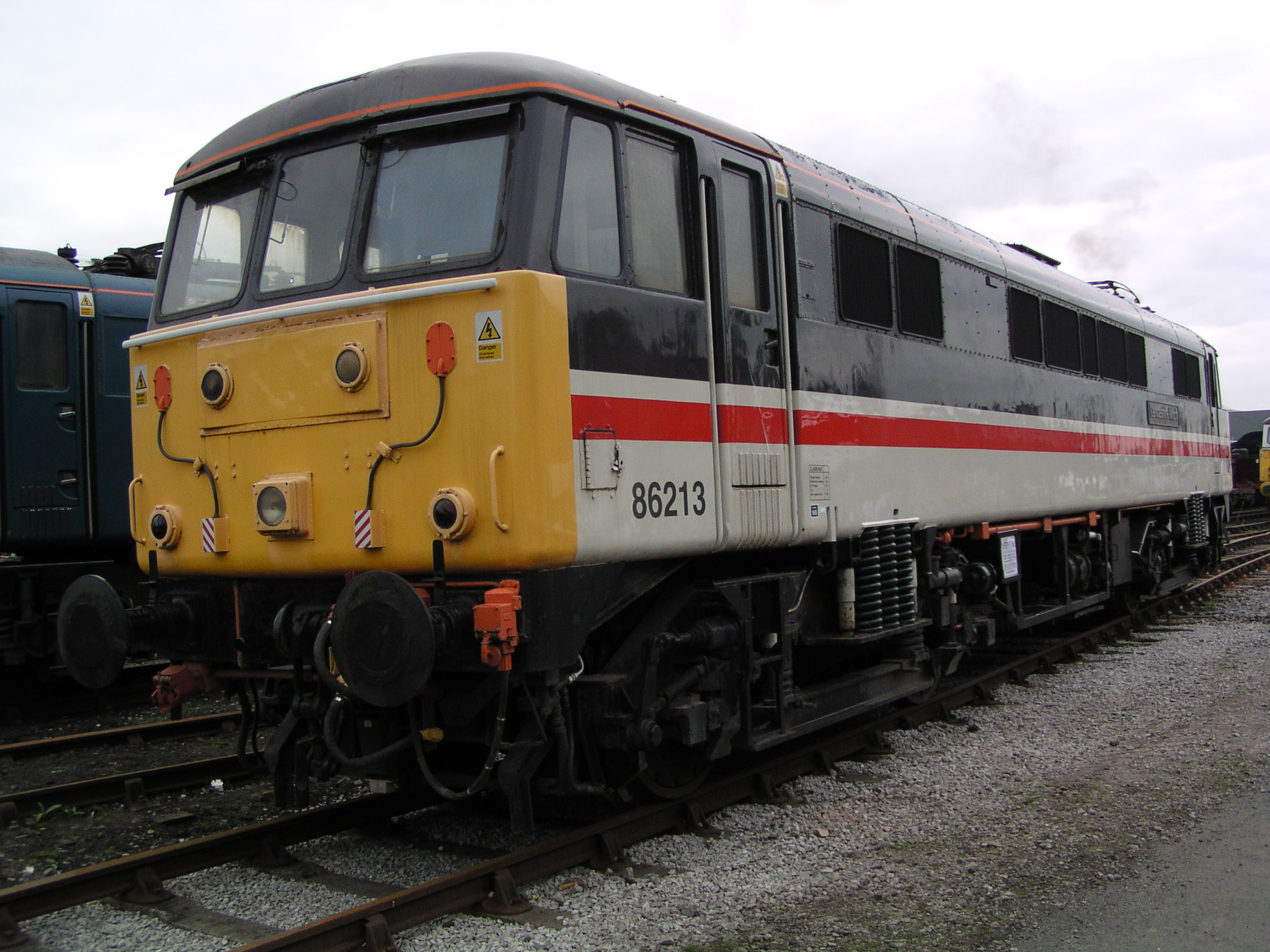
British Rail 86 213 was also named Lancashire Witch

London, Midland and Scottish Railway Royal Scot Class 4-6-0 locomotive 6125 was named Lancashire Witch in March 1928. Later that year an engraved brass plaque was added, depicting the original locomotive of 1828. The name and engraved plaque were removed in July 1935, and on 30 July 1936 a new name 3rd Carabinier was unveiled at a ceremony. The Royal Scot class loco was built by the North British Locomotive Company at Glasgow in September 1927 and withdrawn in October 1964 as 46125.

Class 86 locomotive 86 213 was named Lancashire Witch. This locomotive has been preserved in operational condition by the AC Locomotive Group.

== References and notes ==
=== Bibliography ===
- Nock, O. S. (1957). Steam locomotive, the unfinished story of steam locomotives and steam locomotive men on the railways of Great Britain. George Allen & Unwin. OCLC 2665292. OL 6231650M.
- Goodman, John (1994). Greenwood, William (ed.). LMS Locomotive Names. Lincoln: RCTS. ISBN 0-901115-79-7.
- Skempton, Sir Alec (2002). A Biographical Dictionary of Civil Engineers in Great Britain and Ireland: 1500 to 1830. Thomas Telford. ISBN 0-7277-2939-X.
- Stretton, Clement E. (1989) [1896]. The Development of the Locomotive (5th ed.). London: Bracken Books. ISBN 1-85170-247-4.
