= Timeline of steam power =

Steam power developed slowly over a period of several hundred years, progressing through expensive and fairly limited devices in the early 17th century, to useful pumps for mining in 1700, and then to Watt's improved steam engine designs in the late 18th century. It is these later designs, introduced just when the need for practical power was growing due to the Industrial Revolution, that truly made steam power commonplace.

== Development phases ==
=== Early examples ===
- Circa 30-20 BC – Vitruvius provides the earliest known description of an aeolipile in his work de Architectura, noting hollow bronze vessels that, when water within boils, emit a “violent wind”.
- 1st century AD – Hero of Alexandria describes an aeolipile, as an example of the power of heated air or water. The device consists of a rotating ball spun by steam jets; it produced little power but is nevertheless the first known device moved by steam pressure. He also describes a way of transferring water from one vessel to another using pressure. The methods involved filling a bucket, the weight of which worked tackle to open temple doors, which were then closed again by a deadweight once the water in the bucket had been drawn out by a vacuum caused by cooling of the initial vessel.
- 1125: In Reims, according to William of Malmesbury, an organ was powered by heated water. He claims it was built by Pope Sylvester II.
- Late 15th century AD: Leonardo Da Vinci described the Architonnerre, a steam-powered cannon.
- 1551: Taqi al-Din Muhammad ibn Ma'ruf describes a steam turbine-like device for rotating a spit.
- 1601: Giovanni Battista della Porta performs experiments on using steam to create pressure or a vacuum, building simple fountains similar to a percolator.
- 1606: Jerónimo de Ayanz y Beaumont receives a patent for a steam-powered device for pumping water out of mines.
- 1615: Salomon de Caus, who had been an engineer and architect under Louis XIII, publishes a book showing a device similar to that of Porta.
- 1629: Giovanni Branca suggests using a steam turbine device similar to that described by Taqi al-Din but intended to be used to power a series of pestles working in mortars.
- 1630: David Ramsay is granted a patent for various steam applications, although no description is given and the patent also covers a number of unrelated inventions. He refers to a "fire engine", and this term is used for many years.

=== Development of a practical steam engine ===
- 1663: Edward Somerset, 2nd Marquis of Worcester, publishes a selection of his inventions. One is a new sort of steam pump, essentially two devices like de Caus', but attached to a single boiler. A key invention is the addition of cooling around the containers to force the steam to condense. This produces a partial vacuum inside the chambers, which is used to draw a volume of water into the containers through a pipe, thus forming a pump. He builds one of very large size into the side of Raglan Castle, apparently the first "industrial scale" steam engine. He has plans to build them for mining, but dies before he can set up his company.
- 1680: Christiaan Huygens publishes memoirs describing a gunpowder engine that drives a piston. It is historically notable as the first known description of a piston engine.
- 1698: Thomas Savery introduces a steam pump he calls the Miner's Friend. It is almost certainly a direct copy of Somerset's design. One key improvement is added later, replacing the cold water flow on the outside of the cylinder with a spray directly inside it. A small number of his pumps are built, mostly experimental in nature, but like any system based on suction to lift the water, they have a maximum height of 32 feet (and typically much less). In order to be practical, his design can also use the pressure of additional steam to force the water out the top of the cylinder, allowing the pumps to be "stacked", but many mine owners were afraid of the high risk of explosion and avoided this option. (Savery engines were re-introduced in the 1780s to recirculate water to water wheels driving textile mills, especially in periods of drought).
- c. 1705: Thomas Newcomen develops the atmospheric engine, which, unlike the Savery pump, employs a piston in a cylinder; the vacuum pulling the piston down to the bottom of the cylinder when water is injected into it. The engine enabled a great increase in pumping height and the draining of deeper mines than possible when using vacuum to pull the water up. Savery holds a patent covering all imagined uses of steam power, so Newcomen and his partner John Calley persuade Savery to join forces with them to exploit their invention until the expiration of the patent in 1733.
- 1707: The French inventor Denis Papin publishes a study on steam power, including a number of ideas. One uses a Savery-like engine to lift water onto a water wheel for rotary power. The study also proposes replacing the water of a Savery engine with a piston, which is pulled on by the vacuum in a cylinder after steam inside is condensed, but he was unable to build the device.
- 1718: Jean Desaguliers introduces an improved version of the Savery engine, which includes safety valves and a two-way valve that operated both the steam and cold water (as opposed to two separate valves). It is not commercially employed.

=== The Newcomen Engine: Steam power in practice ===
- 1712: Newcomen installs his first commercial engine.
- 1713: Humphrey Potter, a boy charged with operating a Newcomen engine, installs a simple system to automatically open and close the operating valves. The engine can now be run at 15 strokes a minute with little work other than firing the boiler.
- 1718: Henry Beighton introduces an improved and much more reliable version of Potter's operating system.
- 1720: Leupold designs an engine based on expansion, which he attributes to Papin, in which two cylinders alternately receive steam and then vent to the atmosphere. Although likely a useful design, it appears none were built.
- 1733: Savery's 1698 patent expires, ending the royalty payments Newcomen had been required to make. By this time about 100 Newcomen engines have been built. Over the next 50 years engines are installed in collieries and metal mines all over England, notably in Cornwall, and are also used for municipal water supply and pumping water over water wheels, especially in ironworks.
- 1755: Josiah Hornblower installs the first commercial Newcomen engine in the USA, at the Schuyler Copper Mine in what is now North Arlington in Bergen County, New Jersey, using parts imported from the UK.
- 1769: John Smeaton experiments with Newcomen engines, and also starts building improved engines with much longer piston stroke than previous practice. Later engines, which marked probably the high point of Newcomen engine design, deliver up to 80 horsepower (around 60 kW).
- 1775: By this date about 600 Newcomen engines erected in the UK.
- 1779: The crank first applied by James Pickard to a Newcomen engine, producing rotary motion. Pickard patents this the following year, but the patent is unenforceable.
- 1780: Newcomen engines continue to be built in large numbers (about a thousand between 1775 and 1800), especially for mines but increasingly in mills and factories. Many have Watt condensers added after the patent expires (see below). Several dozen improved Savery engines are also built.

=== Watt's engine ===
- 1765: James Watt invents the separate condenser, the key being to relocate the water jet, (which condenses the steam and creates the vacuum in the Newcomen engine) inside an additional cylindrical vessel of smaller size enclosed in a water bath; the still-warm condensate is then evacuated into a hot well by means of a suction pump allowing the preheated water to be returned to the boiler. This greatly increases thermal efficiency by ensuring that the main cylinder can be kept hot at all times, unlike in the Newcomen engines where the condensing water spray cooled the cylinder at each stroke. Watt also seals the top of the cylinder so that steam at a pressure marginally above that of the atmosphere can act on top of the piston against the vacuum created beneath it.
- 1765: Matthew Boulton opens the Soho Manufactory engineering works in Handsworth.
- 1765: Ivan Polzunov builds a two-cylinder Newcomen engine for powering mine ventilation in Barnaul, Russia. It includes an automated system for governing the water level in the boiler.
- 1769: James Watt is granted a patent on his improved design. He is unable to find someone to accurately bore the cylinder and is forced to use a hammered iron cylinder. The engine performed poorly, due to the cylinder being out of round, allowing leakage past the piston. However, the increase in efficiency is enough for Watt and his partner Matthew Boulton to license the design based on the savings in coal per year, as opposed to a fixed fee. It would take Watt ten years in total to get an accurately bored cylinder.
- 1774: John Wilkinson invents a boring machine capable of boring precise cylinders. The boring bar goes completely through the cylinder and is supported on both ends, unlike earlier cantilevered boring tools. Boulton in 1776 writes that "Mr. Wilkinson has bored us several cylinders almost without error; that of 50 inches diameter, which we have put up at Tipton, does not err on the thickness of an old shilling in any part".
- 1775: Watt and Boulton enter into a formal partnership. Watt's patent is extended by Act of Parliament for 25 years until 1800.
- 1776: First commercial Boulton and Watt engine built. At this stage and until 1795 B&W only provided designs and plans, the most complicated engine parts, and support with on-site erection.
- 1781: Jonathan Hornblower patents a two-cylinder "compound" engine, in which the steam pushes on one piston (as opposed to pulling via vacuum as in previous designs), and when it reaches the end of its stroke is transferred into a second cylinder that exhausts into a condenser as "normal". Hornblower's design is more efficient than Watt's single-acting designs, but similar enough to his double-acting system that Boulton and Watt are able to have the patent overturned by the courts in 1799.
- 1782: First Watt rotative engine, driving a flywheel by means of the sun and planet gear rather than a crank, thus avoiding James Pickard's patent. Watt secures further patents in this year and 1784.
- 1783: Watt builds his first "double acting" engine, which admits steam so as to alternately act on one side of the piston then on the other, and the introduction of his parallel motion linkage allows the transmission of the power of the piston motion to be transmitted to the beam on both strokes. This change enables use of a flywheel imparting steady rotary motion controlled by a governor, thus making it possible for the engine to drive machinery in non speed critical applications like milling, breweries and other manufacturing industries. Because the centrifugal governor alone had poor response to load changes, Watt's engine was not suitable for cotton spinning.
- 1784: William Murdoch demonstrates a model steam carriage working on "strong steam". He is dissuaded from patenting his invention by his employer, James Watt.
- 1788: Watt builds the first steam engine to use a centrifugal governor for the Boulton & Watt Soho factory.
- 1790: Nathan Read invented the tubular boiler and improved cylinder, devising the high-pressure steam engine.
- 1791: Edward Bull makes a seemingly obvious design change by inverting the steam engine directly above the mine pumps, eliminating the large beam used since Newcomen's designs. About 10 of his engines are built in Cornwall.
- 1795: Boulton and Watt open their Soho Foundry, for the manufacture of steam engines
- 1799: Richard Trevithick builds his first high-pressure engine at Dolcoath tin mine in Cornwall.
- 1800: Watt's patent expires. By this time about 450 Watt engines (totaling 7,500 hp) and over 1,500 Newcomen engines have been built in the UK.

=== Improving power ===
- 1801: Richard Trevithick builds and runs Camborne road engine.
- 1801: Oliver Evans builds his first high-pressure steam engine in the U.S. (Ptd. 1804)
- 1804: Richard Trevithick builds and runs single-cylinder flywheel locomotive on the 9-mile Pen-y-Darran tramway. Due to plate breakages the engine is installed at Dowlais for stationary use.
- 1804: John Steel builds locomotive to Trevithick's model at Gateshead for Mr Smith. This is demonstrated to Christopher Blackett who refuses it for reasons of excess weight.
- 1804: Arthur Woolf re-introduces Hornblower's double-cylinder designs now that Watt's patents have expired. He goes on to build a number of examples with up to nine cylinders as boiler pressures increase through better manufacturing and materials.
- 1808: Christopher Blackett relays track at Wylam Colliery.
- 1808: Richard Trevithick demonstrates the passenger carrying railway with his "steam circus" (using the locomotive Catch Me Who Can on a circular track) in London.
- 1811: Blackett employs Thomas Waters to build a new flywheel locomotive.
- 1811: Blackett instructs Timothy Hackworth to build hand-cranked chassis to prove feasibility of smooth rail for traction.
- 1811: Second Wylam locomotive built by Blackett's development team consisting of Timothy Hackworth, William Hedley, and Jonathan Foster.
- 1812: Blenkinsop develops rack railway system in collaboration with Matthew Murray of Leeds Round Foundry - single-flue boiler; vertical cylinders sunk into boiler.
- 1813: Third Wylam locomotive built, with 8 wheels to spread axle load.
- 1815: George Stephenson builds Blücher - similar to Blenkinsop model.
- 1825: Robert Stephenson & Co build Locomotion for Stockton and Darlington Railway.
- 1827: Timothy Hackworth builds highly efficient Royal George with centrally-placed blastpipe in the chimney for Stockton and Darlington Railway.
- 1829: Robert Stephenson & Co successfully competes at Rainhill Trials with The Rocket against Hackworth's Sans Pareil and Braithwaite's and Ericsson's Novelty.
- 1830: Stephensonian locomotive configuration appears with Stephenson's Planet type along with Edward Bury's Liverpool - horizontal cylinders placed beneath smokebox; drive to rear crank - bar frames. Liverpool Manchester Line opens with tumultuous acclaim
- 1849: George Henry Corliss develops and markets the Corliss-type steam engine, a four-valve counterflow engine with separate steam admission and exhaust valves. Trip valve mechanisms provide sharp cutoff of steam during admission stroke. The governor is used to control the cut off instead of the throttle valve. The efficiency of Corliss engines greatly exceeds other engines of the period, and they are rapidly adopted in stationary service throughout industry. The Corliss engine has better response to changes in load and runs at a more constant speed, making it suitable for applications such as thread spinning.
- 1854: John Ramsbottom publishes a report on his use of oversized split steel piston rings which maintain a seal by outward spring tension on the cylinder wall. This allows much better sealing (compared to earlier cotton seals) which leads to significantly higher system pressures before "blow-by" is experienced.
- 1862: The Allen steam engine (later called Porter-Allen) is exhibited at the London Exhibition. It is precision engineered and balanced allowing it to operate at from three to five times the speed of other stationary engines. The short stroke and high speed minimize condensation in the cylinder, significantly improving efficiency. The high speed allows direct coupling or the use of reduced sized pulleys and belting.
- 1862: The steam engine indicator is exhibited at the London Exhibition. Developed for Charles Porter by Charles Richard, the steam engine indicator traces on paper the pressure in the cylinder throughout the cycle, which can be used to spot various problems and to optimize efficiency. Earlier versions of the steam engine indicator were in use by 1851, though relatively unknown.
- 1865: Auguste Mouchout invents the first device to convert solar energy into mechanical steam power, using a cauldron filled with water enclosed in glass, which would be put in the sun to boil the water.
- 1867: Stephen Wilcox and his partner George Herman Babcock patent the "Babcock & Wilcox Non-Explosive Boiler", which uses water inside clusters of tubing to generate steam, typically with higher pressures and more efficiently than the typical "firetube" boilers of that time. Babcock & Wilcox-type boiler designs become popular in new installations.
- 1881: Alexander C. Kirk obtained the necessary high pressure boilers for the first practical installation of a triple expansion marine engine in SS Aberdeen.
- 1884: Charles Algernon Parsons develops the steam turbine. Used early on in electrical generation and to power ships, turbines were bladed wheels that created rotary motion when high pressure steam was passed through them. The efficiency of large steam turbines was considerably better than the best compound engines, while also being much simpler, more reliable, smaller and lighter all at the same time. Steam turbines would eventually replace piston engines for most power generation.
- 1893: Nikola Tesla patents a steam powered oscillating electro-mechanical generator. Tesla hoped it would become competitive with steam turbines in producing electric current but it never found use outside his laboratory experiments.
- 1897: Stanley Brothers begin selling lightweight steam cars, over 200 being made.
- 1899: The Locomobile Company begins manufacture of the first production steam-powered cars, after purchasing manufacturing rights from the Stanley Brothers.
- 1902: The Stanley Motor Carriage Company begins manufacture of the Stanley Steamer, the most popular production steam-powered car.
- 1903: Commonwealth Edison Fisk Generating Station opens in Chicago, using 32 Babcock & Wilcox boilers driving several GE Curtis turbines, at 5,000 and 9,000 kilowatts each, the largest turbine-generators in the world at that time. Almost all electric power generation, from the time of the Fisk Station to the present, is based on steam driven turbine-generators.
- 1913: Nikola Tesla patents a bladeless steam turbine that utilizes the boundary layer effect. This design has never been used commercially due to its low efficiency.
- 1923: Alan Arnold Griffith publishes An Aerodynamic Theory of Turbine Design, describing a way to dramatically improve the efficiency of all turbines. In addition to making newer power plants more economical, it also provides enough efficiency to build a jet engine.
- 1933: George and William Besler of the United States are the first aviators (and to this date only aviators) to successfully fly on steam power on April 12, 1933 with a converted Travel Air 2000 biplane, using a 90° V-twin compound engine of their own design.
- 2009: On August 25, 2009, Team Inspiration of the British Steam Car Challenge broke the long-standing record for a steam vehicle set by a Stanley Steamer in 1906, setting a new speed record of 139.843 mph (225.055 km/h) over a measured mile at Edwards Air Force Base, in the Mojave Desert of California.
- 2009: On August 26, 2009, Team Inspiration broke a second record by setting a new speed record of 148.308 mph (238.679 km/h) over a measured kilometer.
- Steam turbines are made to 1,500 MW (2,000,000 hp) to generate electricity.

== See also ==
- Steam engine
- Steam power during the Industrial Revolution
- Maritime timeline
- Timeline of heat engine technology
