= Flued boiler =

Type of boiler used to make steam

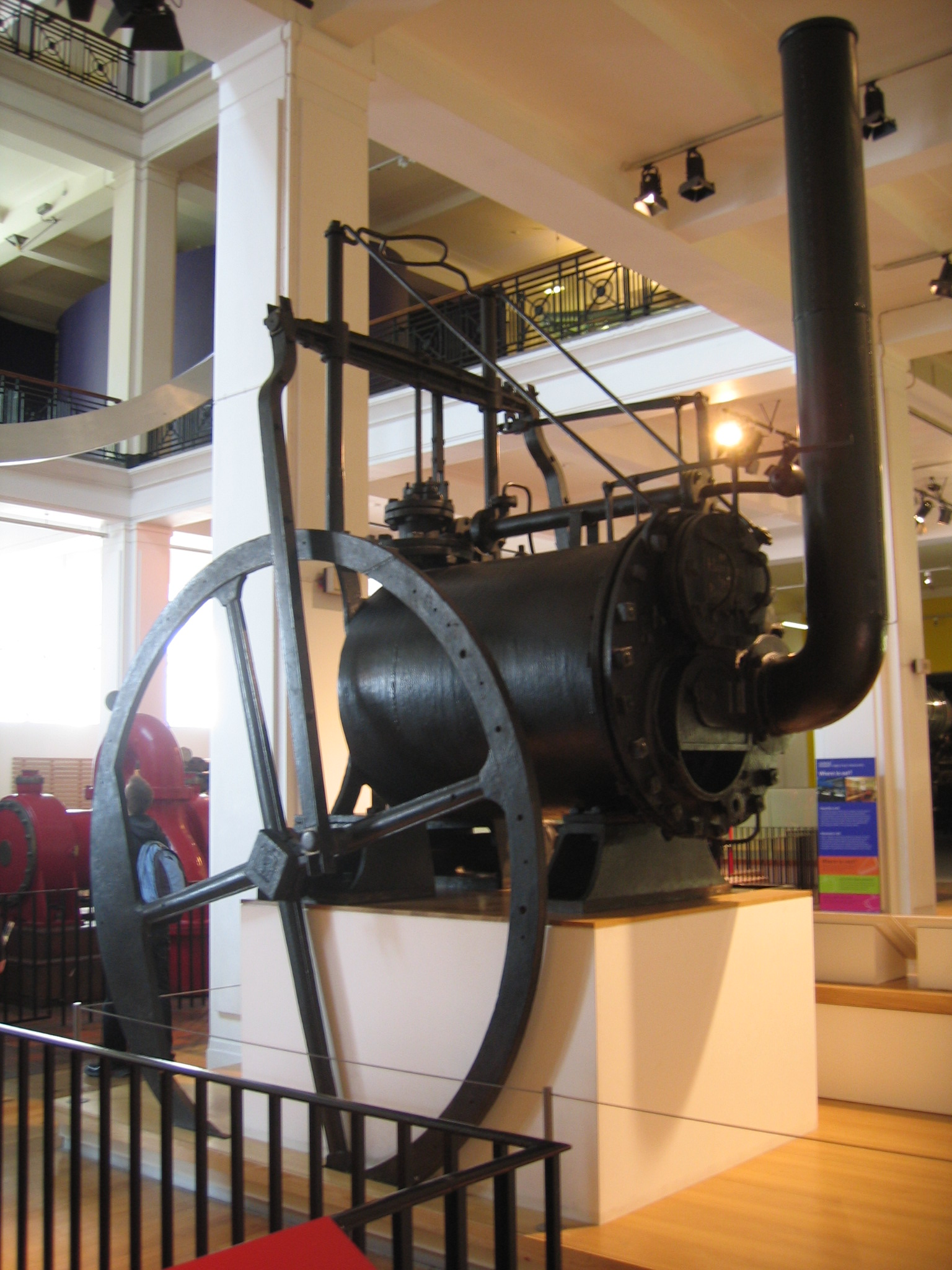
Trevithick's engine of 1806 is built around an early example of a flued boiler (specifically, a return-flue type)

A shell or flued boiler is an early and relatively simple form of boiler used to make steam, usually for the purpose of driving a steam engine. The design marked a transitional stage in boiler development, between the early haystack boilers and the later multi-tube fire-tube boilers. A flued boiler is characterized by a large cylindrical boiler shell forming a tank of water, traversed by one or more large flues containing the furnace. These boilers appeared around the start of the 19th century and some forms remain in service today. Although mostly used for static steam plants, some were used in early steam vehicles, railway locomotives and ships.

Flued boilers were developed in an attempt to raise steam pressures and improve engine efficiency. Early haystack designs of Watt's day were mechanically weak and often presented an unsupported flat surface to the fire. Boiler explosions, usually beginning with failure of this firebox plate, were common. It was known that an arched structure was stronger than a flat plate and so a large circular flue tube was placed inside the boiler shell. The fire itself was on an iron grating placed across this flue, with a shallow ashpan beneath to collect the non-combustible residue. This had the additional advantage of wrapping the heating surface closely around the furnace, but that was a secondary benefit.

Although considered as low-pressure (perhaps 25 psi (1.7 atm)) today, this was regarded as high pressure compared to its predecessors. This increase in pressure was a major factor in making locomotives (i.e. small self-moving vehicles) such as Trevithick's into a practical proposition.

== Centre-flue boilers ==
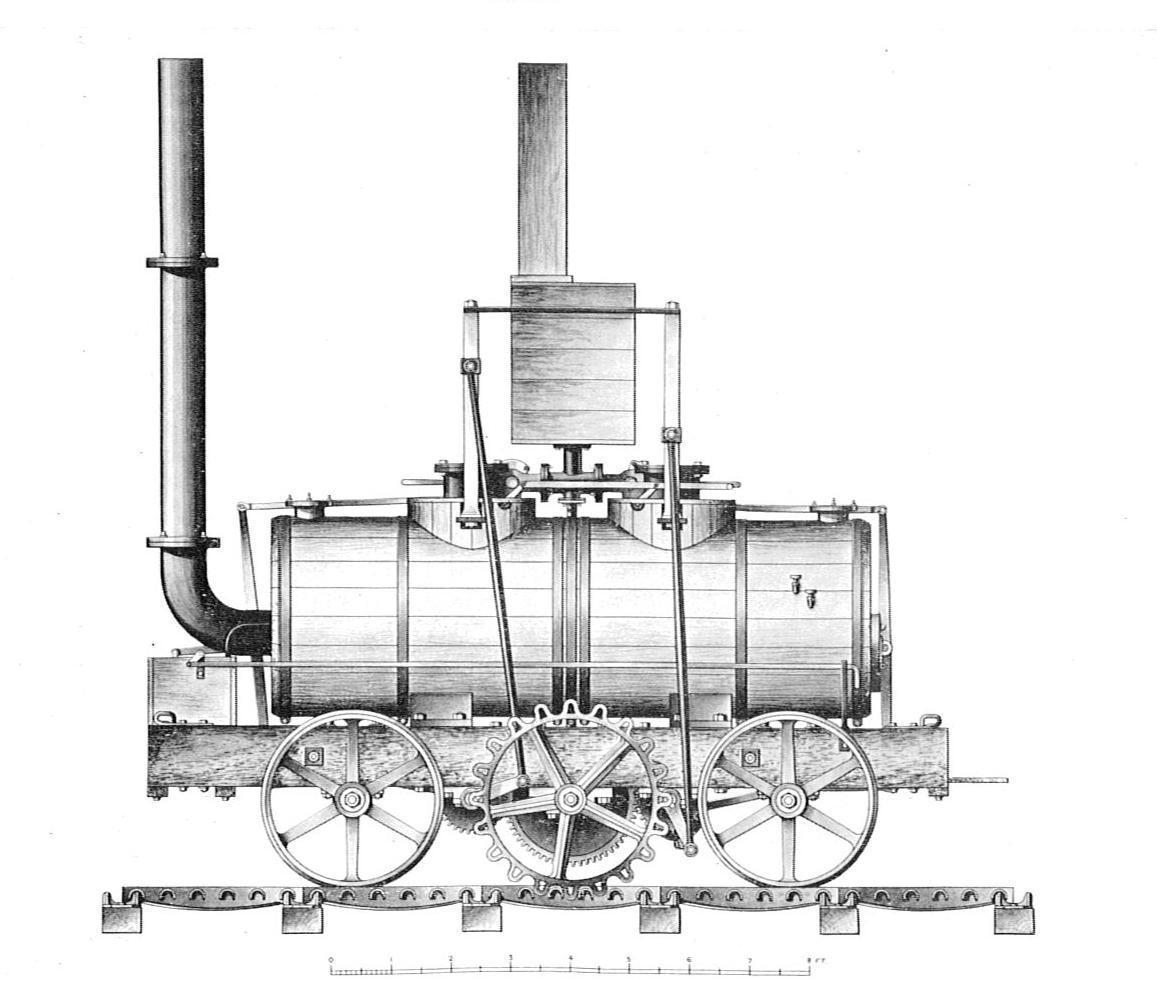
Middleton locomotive

The simplest boiler for locomotives had a single straight flue. It was widely used by many of the early locomotive makers, including Blenkinsop's locomotives for the Middleton Railway and Stephenson's Locomotion No. 1.

This type of boiler is simple to manufacture and strong enough to support "high pressure" (for the period) steam with expansive working in the cylinders. There is also good gas flow through the large flue, so that the fire receives sufficient draught from the action of a tall chimney alone. However it also has little heating area, so is inefficient and burns a large amount of coal.

== Return-flue boilers ==
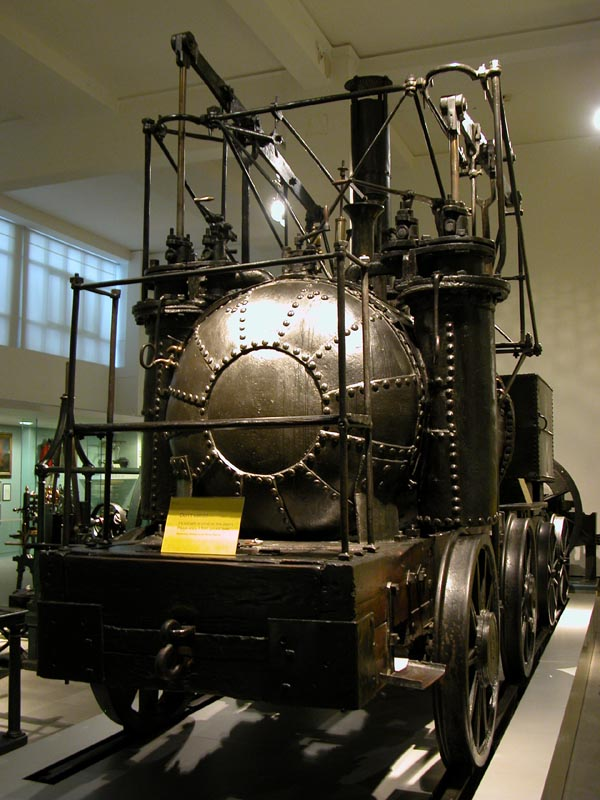
Puffing Billy of 1813, showing the domed end of its return-flue boiler (centre of picture)

A simple flue must be long if it is to offer adequate heating area. In a short boiler shell, such as required for a steam locomotive, this may be done by using a U-shaped return flue that bends back on itself.

Richard Trevithick had already used a return flue with his first 1802 Coalbrookdale locomotive design and 1804 "Pen-y-Darren" engine. These boilers were heavily built of cast iron, short and flat-ended. His 1804/5 "Newcastle" locomotive (actually built in Gateshead) began to show one characteristic feature of the return-flued boiler, a prominent dome shape to resist steam pressure in the solid end opposite both furnace and chimney. In this case the boilermaking, now of wrought iron plates, was likely complicated by Trevithick's single long-travel horizontal cylinder (9 in × 36 in (230 mm × 910 mm) bore × stroke) which emerged through this domed end. This did make work easier for the fireman however, as he was no longer trying to reach a firedoor beneath the long crosshead of the piston.

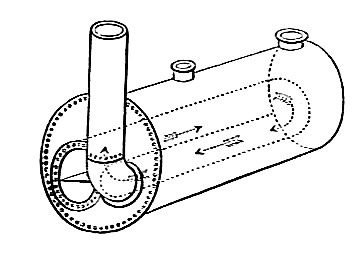

William Hedley used this pattern of boiler for his 1813 locomotives Puffing Billy and Wylam Dilly. Through the Wylam colliery and its owner Christopher Blackett, Hedley would have been familiar with Trevithick's engine.

Timothy Hackworth's 0-6-0 Royal George of 1827 also used a return-flued boiler, although it is best known for its pioneering use of a deliberate blastpipe to encourage draught on the fire. His lighter weight 0-4-0 version for the Rainhill Trials, Sans Pareil was very similar. Even though they appeared antiquated as soon as the Trials were over, the Canadian Samson of this pattern was built in 1838 and still in service in 1883.

=== Huber boilers ===
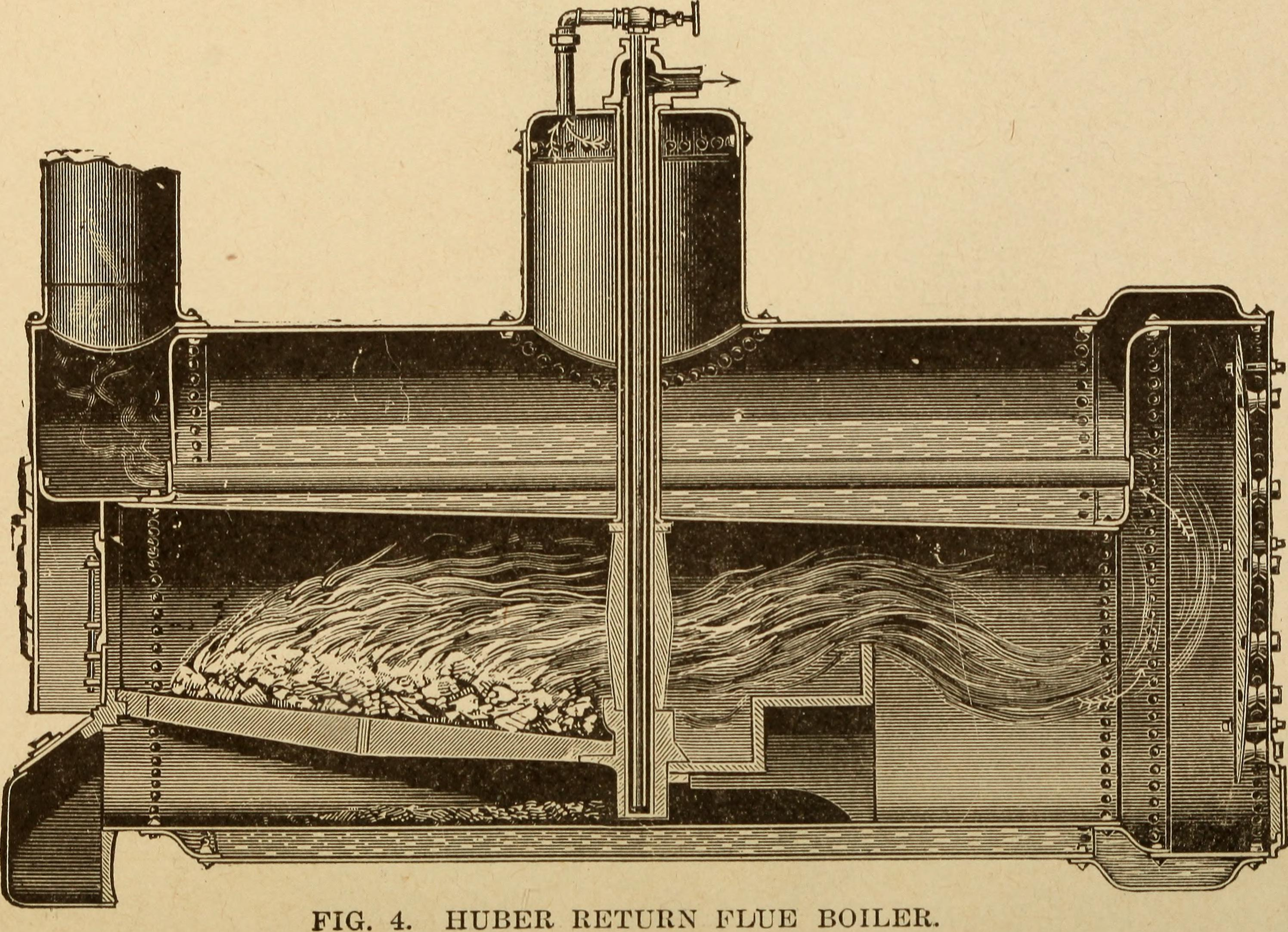
Huber boiler

External images
- "New Huber" traction engine
- Huber traction engine of 1897
- Huber advertisement, and boiler sectional diagram

The last return-flue boilers constructed (other than some stationary boilers) are often considered to be those built by the Huber Co. of Marion, Ohio for their "New Huber" traction engines, from 1885 to 1903.

These were not, however, return-flue boilers in the sense used here, but rather return-tube boilers. They had a single large cylindrical furnace tube, a combustion chamber external to the boiler's pressure shell, then multiple, narrow fire-tubes returning to a horseshoe-shaped smokebox above and around the firedoor. The proximity of this smokebox to the fireman led to their nickname of "belly burners". Their design thus has more in common with the horizontal launch-type boilers (as used by Sir Arthur Heywood) or the Scotch marine boiler than they do with the simple single-flue boiler.

By this time, the locomotive boiler had become ubiquitous for traction engines. Compared to this, the advantage of the Huber boiler was that the firetubes could be replaced more easily, without needing to work from within an enclosed firebox.

== Cornish boiler ==
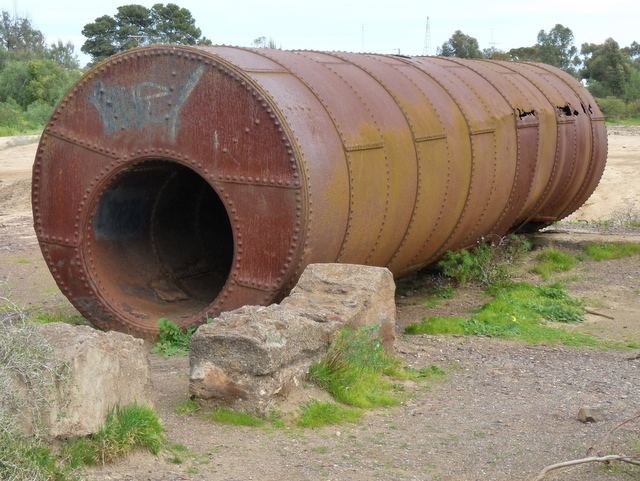
Cornish boiler

The simplest form of flued boiler was Richard Trevithick's "high-pressure" Cornish boiler, first installed at Dolcoath mine in 1812. This is a long horizontal cylinder with a single large flue containing the fire. As the furnace relied on natural draught, a tall chimney was required at the far end of the flue to encourage a good supply of air (oxygen) to the fire.

For efficiency, Trevithick's innovation was to encase beneath the boiler with a brick-built chamber. Exhaust gases passed through the central flue and then routed outside and around the iron boiler shell. To keep the chimney clear of the firing space, the brick flue passed first underneath the centre of the boiler to the front face, then back again along the sides and to the chimney.

Cornish boilers had several advantages over the preceding wagon boilers: they were composed of mostly curved surfaces, better to resist the pressure. Their flat ends were smaller than the flat sides of the wagon boiler and were stayed by the central furnace flue, and sometimes by additional long rod stays. A less obvious advantage was that of boiler scale. Wagon or haystack boilers were heated from beneath and any scale or impurities that formed a sediment settled upon this plate, insulating it from the water. This reduced heating efficiency and could in extremis lead to local overheating and failure of the boiler plates. In the flued boiler, any sediment fell past the furnace flue and settled out at the bottom of the boiler shell, where it had less effect.

In model engineering, the Cornish boiler, particularly when fitted with Galloway tubes (see Lancashire Boiler, below), is an excellent choice for gas-fired boilers and model steam boats. It is simple to build and as efficient as any small-scale boiler.

== Butterley boiler ==
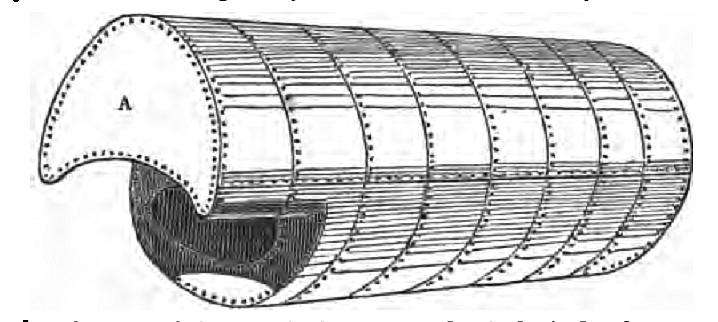
Butterley boiler, from Fairbairn's lecture of 1851

The Butterley or "whistle mouth" boiler is a little-known design derived from the Cornish pattern, produced by the noted Butterley boilerworks of Derbyshire. It is basically a Cornish boiler with the lower half of the shell around the furnace removed, so as to permit a large fire to be lit. This made it popular in the textile mills of the Pennines, where the hard Northern coal was of less calorific value than the Welsh coal used in the South West and required a larger fire. Alternatively it may be considered as a shortened Cornish boiler with a wagon boiler placed in front of it with a larger fire beneath that. It suffers the same drawback as the wagon boiler: the concave firebox plate is mechanically weak and this either limits the working pressure or requires extra mechanical staying.

== Lancashire boiler ==
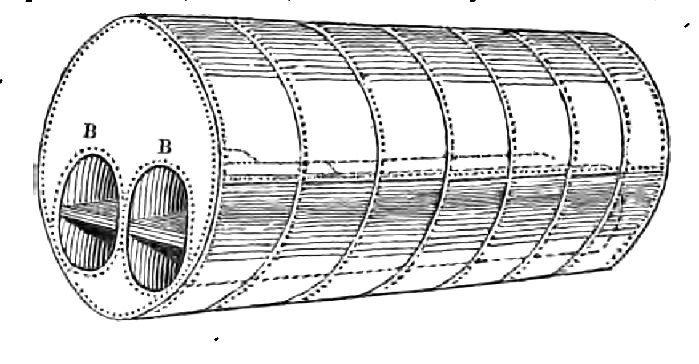
Lancashire boiler, from Fairbairn's lecture

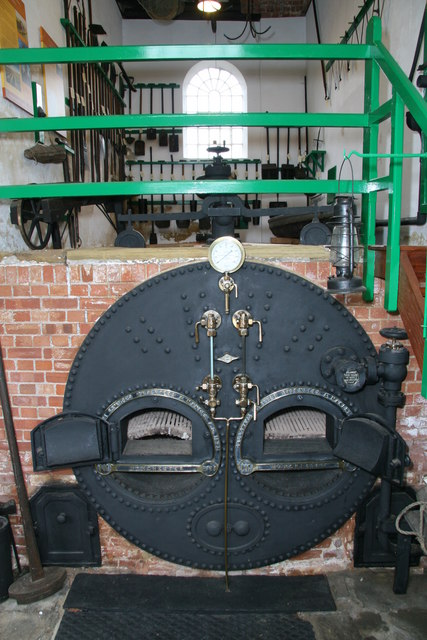
Lancashire boiler at Pinchbeck Pumping Station

The Lancashire boiler is similar to the Cornish, but has two large flues containing the fires instead of one. It is generally considered to be the invention of William Fairbairn and John Hetherington in 1844, although their patent was for the method of firing the furnaces alternately, so as to reduce smoke, rather than the boiler itself. Stephenson's early 0-4-0 locomotive "Lancashire Witch" had already demonstrated the use of twin furnace tubes within a boiler 15 years earlier.

Fairbairn had made a theoretical study of the thermodynamics of more efficient boilers, and it was this that had led him to increase the furnace grate area relative to the volume of water. A particular reason for this was the so-far poor adoption of the Cornish boiler in the cotton mills of Lancashire, where the harder local coal couldn't be burned satisfactorily in the smaller furnace, in favour of the older low-pressure wagon boiler and its large grate.

The difficulties of the Cornish boiler were that a boiler of any particular power would require a known area of furnace tube as the heating area. Longer tubes required a longer and more expensive boiler shell. They also reduced the ratio of grate area relative to the heating area, making it difficult to maintain an adequate fire. Increasing the tube diameter reduced the depth of water covering the furnace tube and so increased the need for accurate control of water level by the fireman, or else the risk of boiler explosion. Fairbairn's studies of hoop stress in cylinders also showed that smaller tubes were stronger than larger tubes. His solution was simple: to replace one large furnace tube with two smaller ones.

The patent showed another advantage of twin furnaces. By firing them alternately and closing the firebox door between firings, it was also possible to arrange a supply of air past the furnace (in the case of a Lancashire boiler, through the ashpan beneath the grate) which would encourage the flue gases produced by the fire to burn more completely and cleanly, thus reducing smoke and pollution. A key factor in this was the distinctive shuttered rotating air damper in the door, which became a feature from the 1840s.

The use of two flues also has a strengthening effect, acting as two long rod stays that support the end plates.

Later developments added Galloway tubes (after their inventor, patented in either 1848 or 1851) crosswise water tubes across the flue, thus increasing the heated surface area. As these are short tubes of large diameter and the boiler continues to use relatively low pressure, this is still not considered a water-tube boiler. The tubes are tapered to make their installation through the flue easier.

Lancashire boilers often show corrugated flues, which absorb thermal expansion without straining the riveted seams. Another development was the "kidney flue" or Galloway boiler, where the two furnaces join together into a single flue, kidney-shaped in cross-section. This widened and flat-topped flue was stayed by the use of Galloway tubes.

Its maximum pressure is 20 bar (290 psi). The maximum diameter of the boiler is 3 m (9.8 ft), has two fire tubes of length varying from 6–10 m (20–33 ft) and diameter of .8–1 m (2.6–3.3 ft)

Although the Lancashire boiler is considered to be an antiquated design, provided that the flue is long enough it can be reasonably efficient. This does lead to a bulky boiler though, particularly for its length, and this has always limited its use to stationary installations. It was the standard boiler in Lancashire cotton mills.

== Fairbairn's five-tube boiler ==
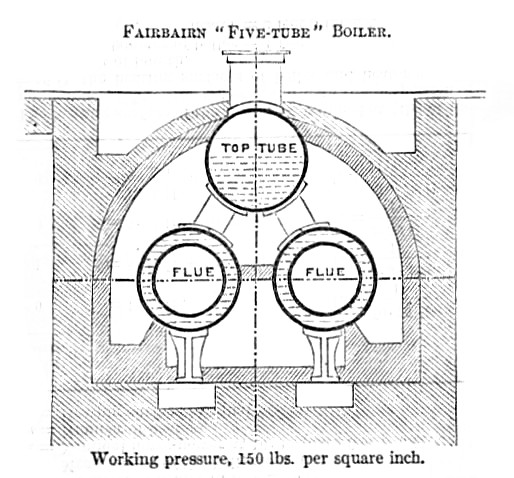
Fairbairn five-tube boiler, end section

William Fairbairn's work on the Lancashire boiler had demonstrated the efficiency virtues of multiple furnaces relative to a reduced water volume. It was also widely understood that higher steam pressures improved the efficiency of engines. Fairbairn's research on the strength of cylinders led him to design another improved boiler, based around far-smaller tube diameters, which would thus be able to operate at higher pressures, typically 150 psi (1,000 kPa). This was the "five tube" boiler, whose five tubes were arranged in two nested pairs as water drum and furnace, with the remaining tube mounted above them as a separate steam drum. The water volume was extremely low compared to previous boiler designs, as the furnace tubes almost filled each of the water drums.

The boiler was successful according to its goals and provided two large furnaces in a small water capacity. The separate steam drum also aided the production of "dry" steam, without the carryover of water and risk of priming. However it was also complex to manufacture, and did not offer a great deal of heating area for the work involved. It was soon superseded by multi-tube boilers such as the Fairbairn-Beeley and the Scotch boilers.

== See also ==
- Scotch marine boiler
