= Blackett of Wylam =

Branch of the Blackett family of County Durham, England

The Blacketts of Wylam were a branch of the Blackett family of Hoppyland, County Durham, England and were related to the Blackett baronets.

John Blackett was High Sheriff of Northumberland in 1692, He married Mary, daughter and heir of Richard Errington.

John Blackett (died 1714) was the son of John (above), grandson of Christopher Blackett of Hoppyland (1612–1675) and the great-nephew of Sir William Blackett. In 1685 he acquired two farms at Wylam, Northumberland, and the Manor estate including the mineral rights, from the exploitation of which the family was to benefit greatly. John was High Sheriff of Northumberland in 1714. His residence was Wylam Hall. He married Elizabeth, daughter of John Bacon.

John Blackett (1712–1769), his son, High Sheriff in 1738, sold the families Co Durham properties and established coal mining and Wylam Colliery in the township in the mid 18th century. The waggonway connecting the colliery to the River Tyne at Lemington was built in 1748 and the colliery continued to flourish until about 1870. He married twice: firstly Dorothy, daughter of Edward Grey, and secondly Elizabeth Crosbie. He was succeeded by another John.

The family were keenly involved in the development of steam power for the improvement of coal transportation. George Stephenson was born in Wylam in 1781. William Hedley, Timothy Hackworth and Jonathan Forster all worked at Wylam Colliery for Christopher Blackett (1751–1829), and there produced the famous early steam locomotives Puffing Billy (1813–1814) and Wylam Dilly (1815)
