= Christopher Blackett =

British colliery and newspaper owner and railway innovator (1751–1829)

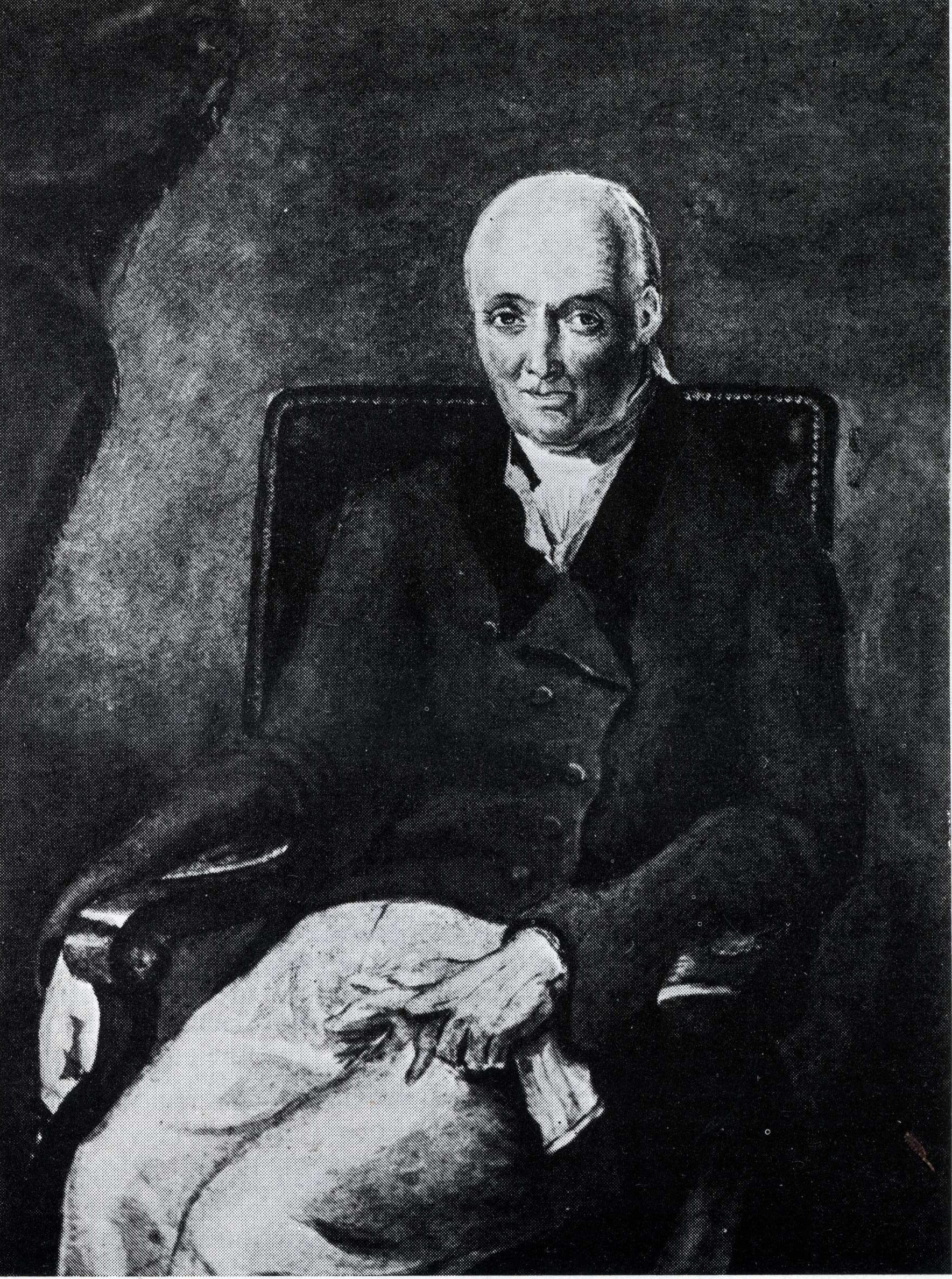
Portrait of Christopher Blackett

Christopher Blackett (c. 1751 – 25 January 1829) owned the Northumberland colliery at Wylam that built Puffing Billy, the first commercial adhesion steam locomotive. He was also the founding owner of The Globe newspaper in 1803.

== Life ==
Blackett was born a Blackett of Wylam and the eldest son by the second marriage of John Blackett, a High Sheriff of Northumberland, whose family descended from Christopher Blackett, an elder brother of Sir William Blackett, and Alice Fenwick, sole heir of her father. In 1659 the coal-rich manor of Wylam passed by inheritance from the Fenwicks to Christopher Blackett (ancestor of article subject) and around 1748 the Wylam waggonway was constructed by John Blackett. This enabled coal to be transported five miles from Wylam colliery to the staithes at Lemington, then on the River Tyne.

The Christopher Blackett of this article succeeded to the lordship of the Manor of Wylam and its collieries in 1800. Prior to this he had been Postmaster of Newcastle and agent for the Blackett-Beaumont Lead Mines in the North Pennines.

In 1804 Christopher Blackett ordered a locomotive from Richard Trevithick. Christopher Blackett owned the Globe newspaper in London which he established in 1803. Norman Hill suggests this is how he encountered Trevithick. Blackett's commissioned engine from Trevithick must have been a sizeable work in 1804. It was made by John Whinfield at Pipewell in Gateshead. It was too heavy for the wooden rails of the waggonway: Whinfield and Blackett fell out.

Blackett then ordered that the waggonway be relaid with cast-iron plate rails. That undertaken, in 1808 Blackett asked Trevithick for another locomotive and was curtly told Trevithick had "discontinued the business". Next, Blackett instructed his viewer (manager), William Hedley, assisted by his foreman smith, Timothy Hackworth to build an alternative locomotive. After several experiments Puffing Billy and Wylam Dilly were constructed in 1813-14 and were hauling coal waggons from Wylam to Lemington. Christopher Blackett's son and heir, Christopher Blackett, and his son John Frederick Burgoyne Blackett both became Members of Parliament. In 1855 his youngest son, Rev John Alexander Blackett (1803–1865), inherited the Whitfield, Northumberland estates of his wife's uncle, William Ord, and changed his name to Blackett-Ord.

== Significance ==
Using the published sources like Philip Brooks (Sources below) the conclusion about Christopher Blackett's importance to the development of the steam locomotive in the United Kingdom is that he was not an engineer but the entrepreneur prepared to invest in the very foundations of steam locomotive technology. Norman Hill wrote, "the importance of Christopher Blackett's place in the introduction of the steam locomotive engine has been sadly overlooked". Brooks wrote of Christopher that he had been instrumental in encouraging the development of locomotives and without his tenacity, the important experiments carried out might never have taken place.

Puffing Billy can still be seen in the Science Museum, London. Wylam Dilly can still be seen in the National Museum of Scotland in Edinburgh. They are the two oldest-surviving railway locomotives in the world.

== Sources ==
- Brooks, P.R.B. (1975), Wylam and its Railway Pioneers, Wylam Parish Council, Wylam
- Hill, Norman (2007), "Timothy Hackworth's Essential Place in Early Locomotive Development", Railway Archive, no. 16, Lightmoor Press, Witney
- Kirtley, Allan; Longbottom, Patricia; Blackett, Martin (2013). A History of the Blacketts. The Blacketts. ISBN 978-0-9575675-0-4.
- Purdue, A.W. (2004). The Ship that Came Home. Third Millennium Publishing. ISBN 1-903942-24-1.
- Young, Robert (1975). Timothy Hackworth and the Locomotive. Shildon.
