= Hackworth Park =

Park in England

- Interactive map of Hackworth Park
- Type: Park
- Location: Shildon, County Durham
- Coordinates: 54°37′50″N 1°38′50″W
- Operator: Shildon Town Council
- Open: All year

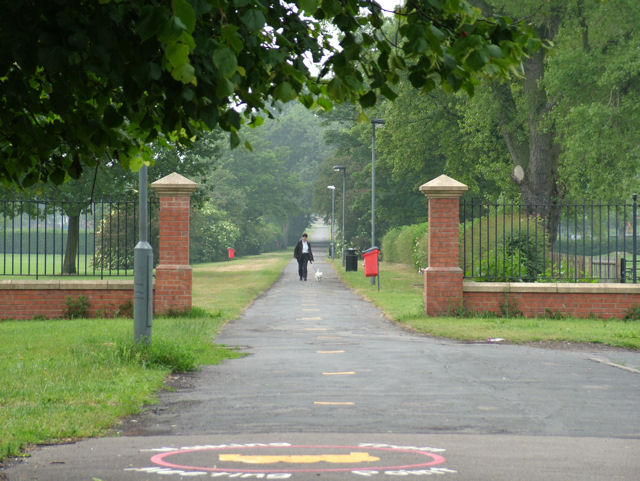
Hackworth Park

Hackworth Park (alternately the Recreation Ground) is a park in Shildon, County Durham, England. It was named after Timothy Hackworth, a railway pioneer from the town.

== History ==
The park was opened on Saturday 28 September 1912. To celebrate the opening there was a procession which included horses, cyclists, the fire brigade, miners lodges and two brass bands. On 30 August 1913 the bandstand was opened. There are two drinking fountains in the park; the first was given by the committee of the old Shildon Working Men's Club and has an ornate canopy with a centre column and herons surrounding the drinking tube. The second is octagonal, it has 8 roundels between dragon's heads depicting a railway locomotive designed by Timothy Hackworth and is Grade II listed with Historic England. The park was named after Timothy Hackworth, a railway pioneer who came from Shildon, there is a statue of him in the park, the original statue was vandalised and moved to the nearby National Railway Museum Shildon with a modern replacement put in its place. The Surtees Rail Trail passes through the park, it is now a footpath that follows the former Surtees Railway Branch Line, which was a private railway created by the Surtees family to link their collieries to the main line.

== Facilities ==
Shildon Town Council and Shildon Civic Hall are at the park. There are also playing fields, tennis courts and football pitches.
