= Sans Pareil =

Early British locomotive

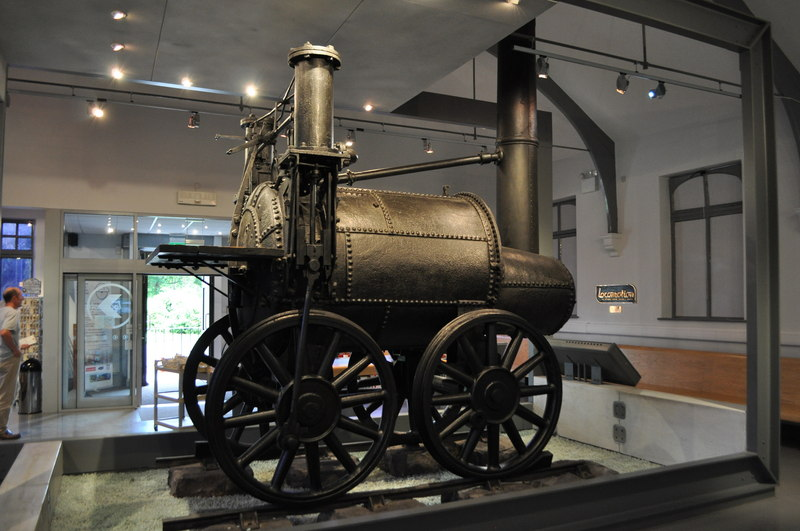
- The original locomotive preserved at Locomotion, in Shildon
Type and origin
- Power type: Steam
- Builder: William Hedley and Timothy Hackworth
Specifications
- Configuration
  - Whyte: 0-4-0
- Driver dia.: 54 in (1.372 m)
- Loco weight: 4.25 long tons (4.32 t; 4.76 short tons)
- Fuel type: Coke
- Cylinders: 2
- Cylinder size: 7 in × 18 in (178 mm × 457 mm)
Career
- Operators: Liverpool and Manchester Railway, Bolton and Leigh Railway

Sans Pareil is a steam locomotive built by Timothy Hackworth, which took part in the 1829 Rainhill Trials on the Liverpool and Manchester Railway held to select a builder of locomotives. The name is French and means 'peerless' or 'without equal'.

== Design ==
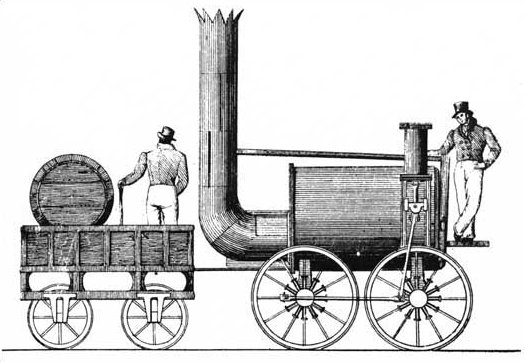
Drawing of Sans Pareil from 1829

While an extremely capable locomotive for the day, its technology was somewhat antiquated compared to George and Robert Stephenson's Rocket, the winner of the Rainhill Trials and the £500 prize money. Instead of the fire tube boiler of Rocket, Sans Pareil had a double return flue. To increase the heating surface area, the two flues were joined by a U-shaped tube at the forward end of the boiler; the firebox and chimney were both positioned at the same end, one on either side. Sans Pareil had two cylinders, mounted vertically at the opposite end to the chimney, and driving one pair of driving wheels directly - the other pair were driven via connecting rods, in the typical steam locomotive fashion.

== Rainhill Trials ==
At the Rainhill Trials, Sans Pareil was excluded from the prize because it was slightly over the maximum permitted weight. Nevertheless, it performed very well, but had a strange rolling gait due to its vertical cylinders and the draft from the blastpipe was, in Hackworth's trademark style, very strong, so most of the coke was expelled out of the chimney unburnt. It was this more than its antiquated design that caused its poor fuel economy. It was pulled out of the competition because of a cracked cylinder; the design thickness for the cylinder walls was some 1 3/4 inches (44 mm) but, at the point of failure, it was found to be a mere 5/8 inch (16 mm).

The manufacture of the cylinders had been contracted out to Robert Stephenson & Co., which was accused by Hackworth's supporters of sabotage but, as he had had over twenty cylinders cast and chose the best two for the locomotive, foul play on the part of the Stephensons was unlikely. After the trials, the Liverpool and Manchester Railway bought Sans Pareil, along with Rocket. It was leased subsequently to the Bolton and Leigh Railway, where it ran until 1844. It was then used by John Hargreaves as a stationary boiler at the Coppull Colliery, in Chorley, until 1863.

Thereafter, Sans Pareil was restored and presented to the Patent Office Museum in 1864, which later became the Science Museum, by John Hick MP.

The engine now resides on static display at the Locomotion Museum, in Shildon, County Durham.

== Replica ==
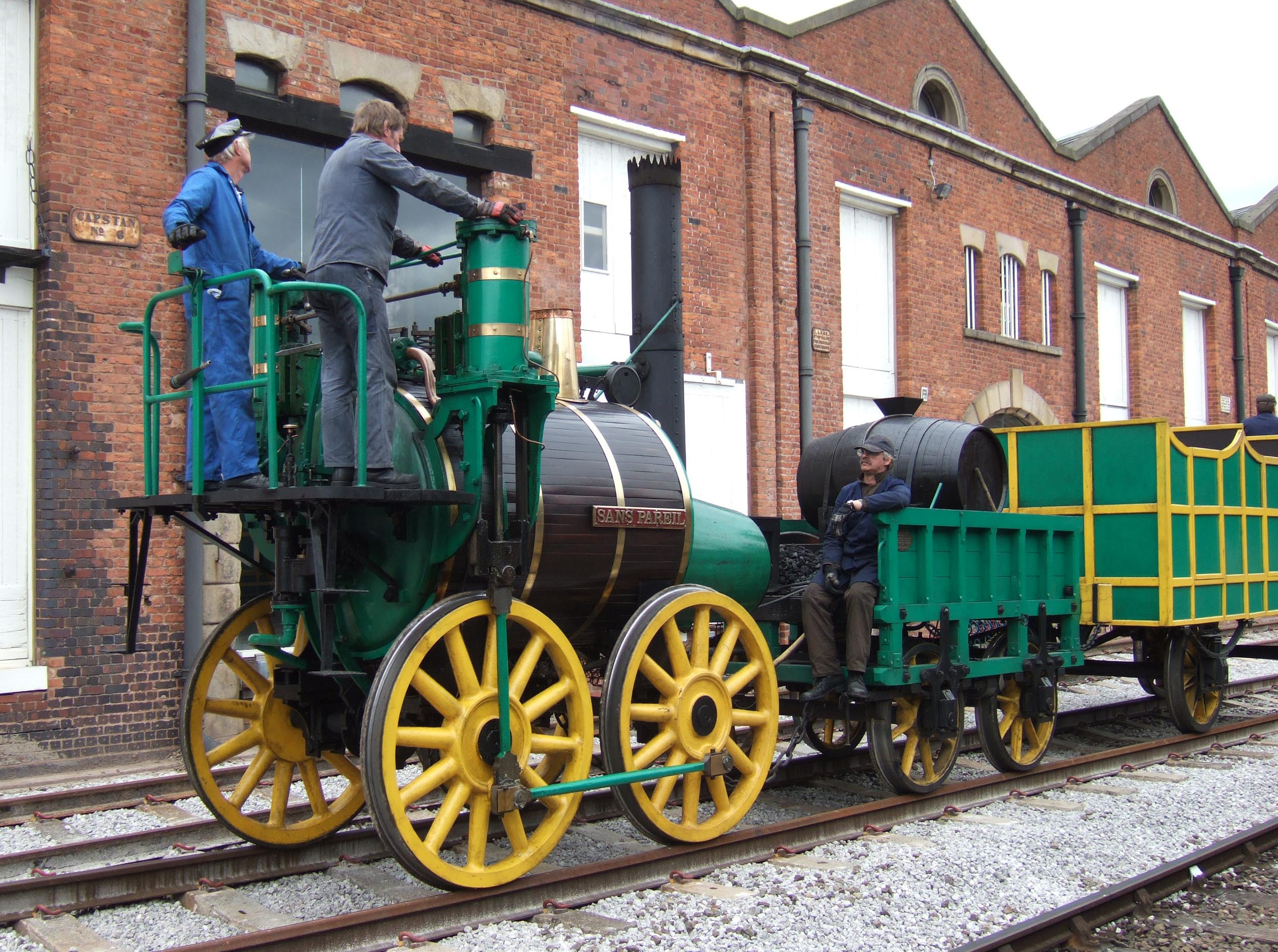
The working replica of Sans Pareil making demonstration runs at the Science and Industry Museum, in Manchester

A replica locomotive, built in 1979, is now preserved by the National Railway Museum at its Locomotion Museum annex, along with what remains of the original locomotive.

== Models ==
In the late 1970s, the company L-S LOC AG in Basel, Switzerland, built several live steam models, including Sans Pareil, in several batches of 500 pieces. The Stephenson’s Rocket followed and the Crampton locomotive was the last model produced in the early 1980s. In order to have a consistent appearance, all visible surfaces of all models were gold plated.

== Eponymous locomotives ==
- LMS Royal Scot Class 4-6-0 steam locomotive no. 6126 carried the name. It was built by the North British Locomotive Company at Glasgow in September 1927; it was withdrawn in October 1963, as 46126 Royal Army Service Corps
- Class 86 electric locomotive no. 86214 carried the name between 1980 and 2005. It was built at Doncaster Works in 1965 and was repainted into a special livery to mark the 150th Anniversary of the Rainhill Trials in 1980; it was scrapped in 2006.
