= Puffing Billy (locomotive) =

Preserved early British steam locomotive

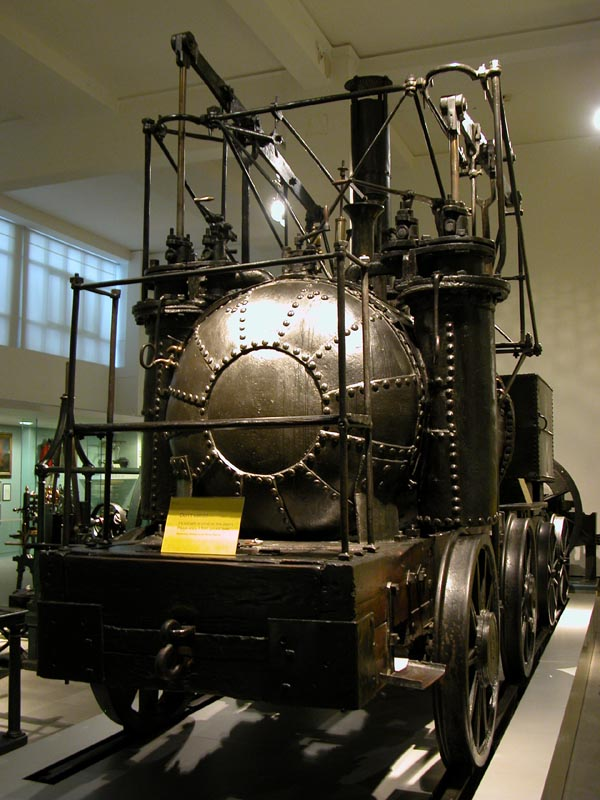
- Puffing Billy as seen from the front
Type and origin
- Power type: Steam
- Builder: William Hedley, Jonathan Forster and Timothy Hackworth
- Build date: 1814; 212 years ago
Specifications
- Configuration
  - Whyte: 0-4-0, rebuilt as 0-8-0 with geared drive, then reverted to 0-4-0
- Gauge: 5 ft (1,524 mm)
- Driver dia.: 39 in (991 mm)
- Loco weight: 8.25 long tons (8.38 t; 9.24 short tons)
- Fuel type: Coal
- Boiler pressure: 50 psi (0.34 MPa)
- Cylinders: 2
- Cylinder size: 9 in × 36 in (229 mm × 914 mm)
Performance figures
- Maximum speed: 5 mph (8 km/h)
Career
- Operators: Wylam Colliery
- Retired: 1862
- Current owner: Science Museum, London
- Disposition: static display

Puffing Billy is the world's oldest surviving steam locomotive, constructed in 1813–1814 by William Hedley, enginewright Jonathan Forster and blacksmith Timothy Hackworth for Christopher Blackett, the owner of Wylam Colliery near Newcastle upon Tyne, in the United Kingdom. It was employed to haul coal chaldron wagons from the mine at Wylam to the docks at Lemington in Northumberland.

== History ==
=== Precursors ===
The first steam-powered locomotive on rails was built by Richard Trevithick in either 1802 or 1804. He built several locomotives, and although the success of his 1802 locomotive at Coalbrookdale is questioned, his 1804 locomotive ran near the Pen-y-Darren Ironworks in Merthyr Tydfil, South Wales successfully enough to haul five wagons of iron for nine miles, winning a wager. Its excessive weight cracked the iron rails, rendering it impractical, and steam locomotives were not adopted at the time.

In 1810, the Durham Coalfield was disrupted by a major strike over the Bond system. During this time Christopher Blackett, owner of the Wylam Colliery, took advantage of the pit's idleness to experiment with the idea of a locomotive-hauled tramway worked purely by adhesion, rather than the Blenkinsop rack system that would be used on the Middleton. These began with a simple hand-cranked wagon, converted from a coal wagon chassis with the addition of a central drive shaft and geared drives to the axles.

As this experiment was successful, by 1812 it was followed by Wylam's first prototype 'travelling engine', worked by steam. This was based on a combination of the test wagon, with a single cylinder engine and boiler atop it. Little is known of the design, although it has been said to have been inspired by Trevithick's Pen-y-darren locomotive. It is unclear whether the single cylinder was vertical or horizontal, and whether the boiler had a single straight flue or a return flue. It may have been nicknamed Grasshopper. The 'travelling engine' was successful as a prototype, but underpowered and prone to stalling when overloaded or faced by a gradient. It was however convincing enough as a demonstration to encourage Blackett to fund further locomotives.

=== Prototypes ===
Puffing Billy was one of three similar engines built by Hedley, the resident engineer at Wylam Colliery, to replace the horses used as motive power on the tramway. In 1813, Hedley built for Blackett's colliery business on the Wylam Colliery line the prototypes, Puffing Billy and Wylam Dilly. They were both rebuilt in 1815 with ten wheels, but were returned to their original condition in 1830 when the railway was relaid with stronger rails.

In the September 1814 edition of Annals of Philosophy two locomotives with rack wheels are mentioned (probably Salamanca and Blücher), then there is mention of "another steam locomotive at Newcastle, employed for a similar purpose [hauling coals], and moving along without any rack wheel, simply by its friction against the rail road". From the context, this is at a different location to Blücher, so is probably Puffing Billy.

Puffing Billy remained in service until 1862, when Edward Blackett, the owner of Wylam Colliery, lent it to the Patent Office Museum in South Kensington, London (later the Science Museum). He later sold it to the museum for £200. It is still on display there. Its sister locomotive, Wylam Dilly, is preserved in the National Museum of Scotland in Edinburgh.

Two replicas exist: one, built in a Royal Bavarian State Railways workshop in 1906, is at the German Museum, Munich; the other, at Beamish Museum, was first run in 2006.

== Design ==
Puffing Billy incorporated a number of novel features, patented by Hedley, which were to prove important to the development of locomotives. It had two vertical cylinders, one on each side of the boiler, and partly enclosed by it, and drove a single crankshaft beneath the frames, from which gears drove and also coupled the wheels allowing better traction.

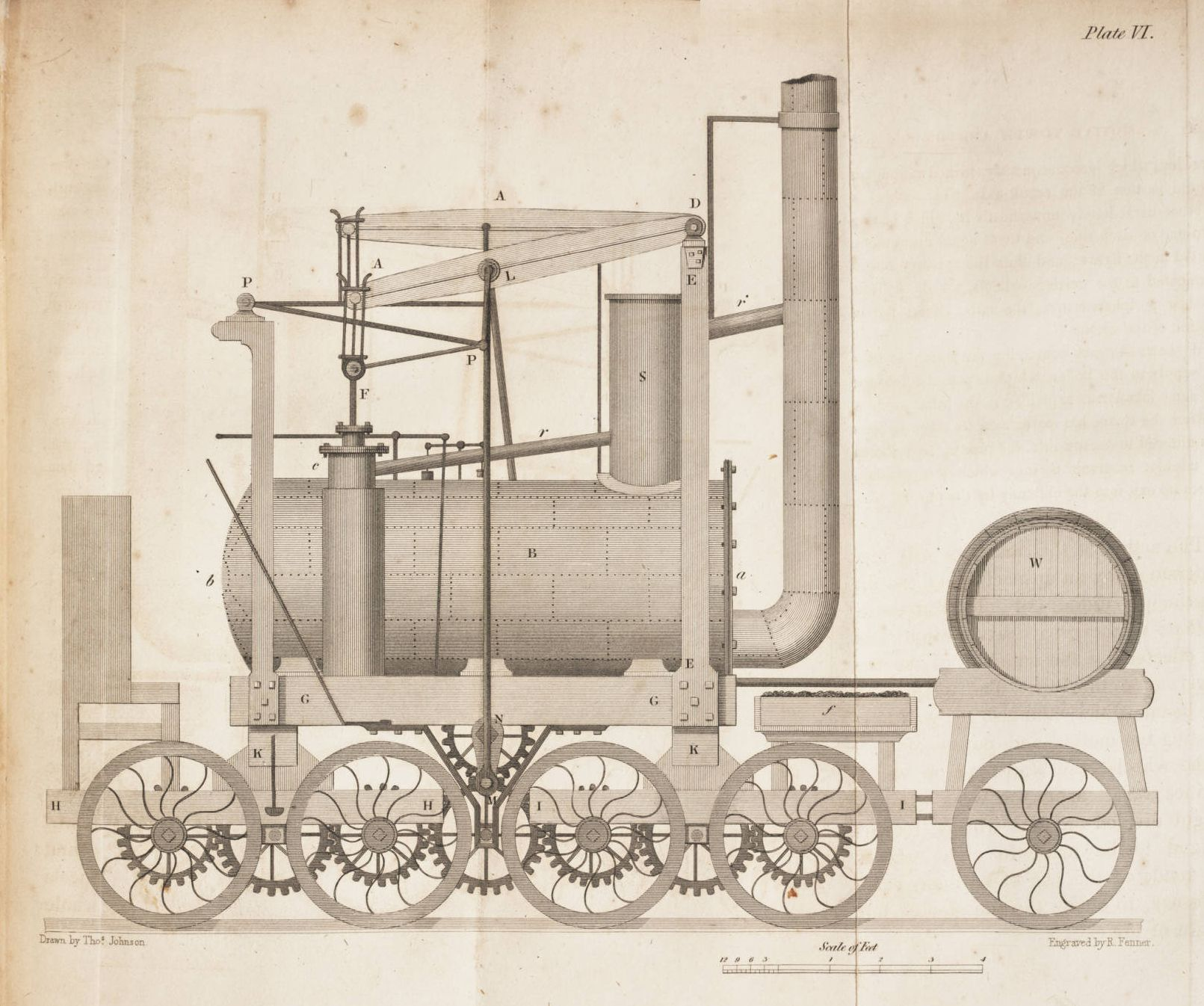
Eight-coupled form

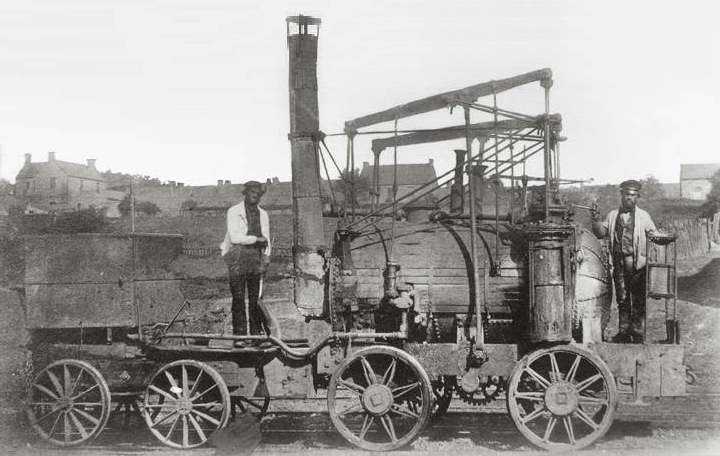
Final four-wheeled form, in 1862

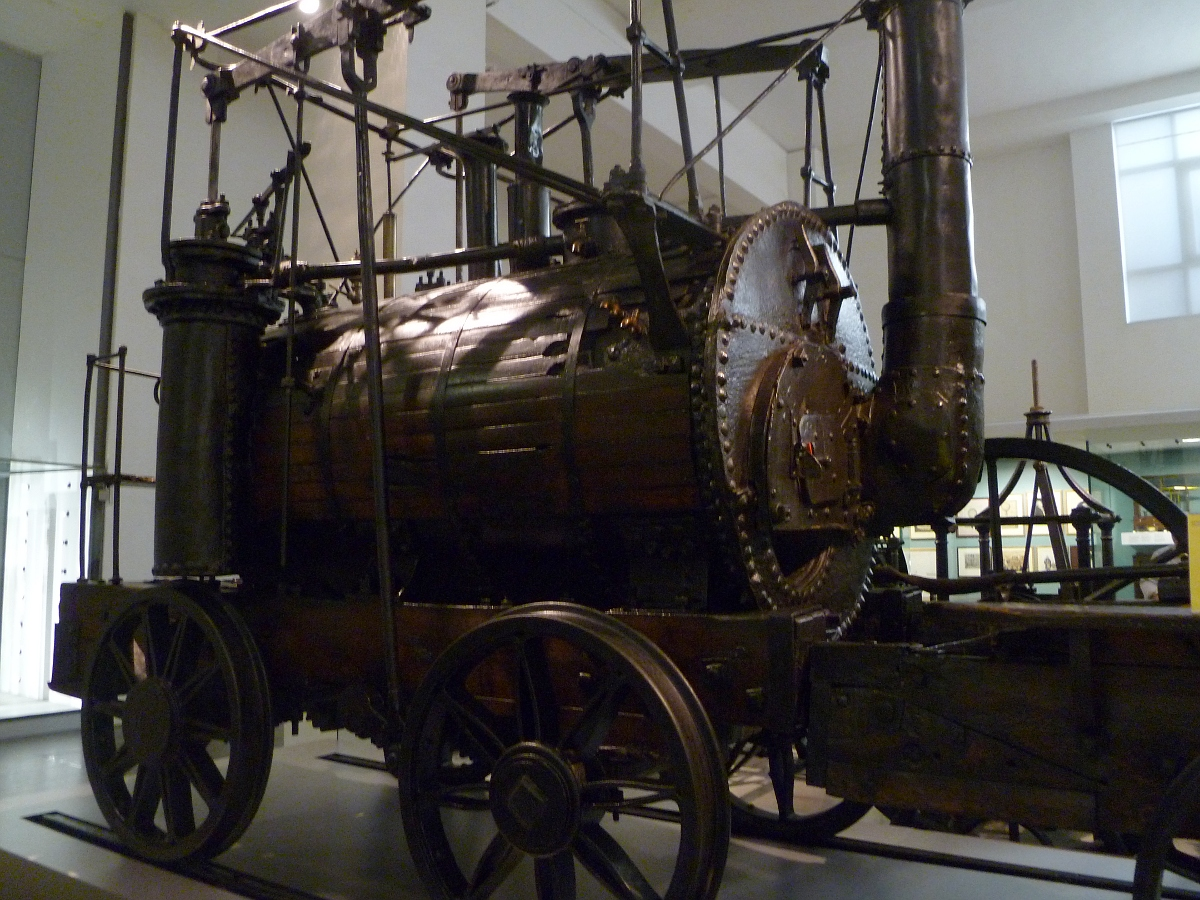
Current appearance in its present location, in 2011

The engine had a number of serious technical limitations. It was only capable of at most 5 mph (8.0 km/h) and its eight-ton weight broke the cast-iron wagonway plates, resulting in criticism from locomotive opponents. This problem was resolved by doubling the number of axles to better distribute the weight. The engine was eventually rebuilt with two axles when improved edge rail track was introduced around 1830.

== Legacy ==
Puffing Billy was an important influence on George Stephenson, who lived locally, and its success was a key factor in promoting the use of steam locomotives by other collieries in north-eastern England.

It has been suggested that Puffing Billy's name survives in the English language in the intensifier like billy-o, but there are several alternative explanations for that phrase's origin.

== Sources ==
- Smith, George Turner (2015). Thomas Hackworth: Locomotive Engineer. Fonthill. pp. 26–32. ISBN 978-1-78155-464-7.
