= Wylam Dilly =

Preserved early British steam locomotive

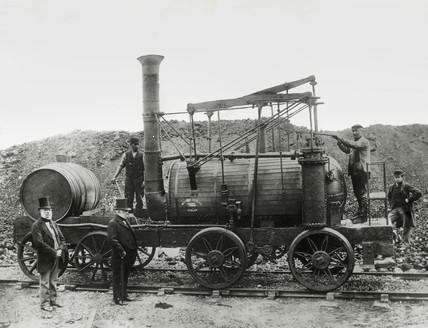
- Wylam Dilly in 1862.
Type and origin
- Power type: Steam
- Builder: William Hedley and Timothy Hackworth
- Build date: circa 1815; 211 years ago
Specifications
- Configuration
  - Whyte: 0-4-0
- Gauge: 5 ft (1,524 mm)
- Driver dia.: 39 in (991 mm)
- Loco weight: 8 long tons (8.1 t; 9.0 short tons)
- Fuel type: Coal
- Cylinders: 2
- Cylinder size: 9 in × 36 in (229 mm × 914 mm)
Career
- Disposition: static display at the National Museum of Scotland in Edinburgh

Wylam Dilly is the second oldest surviving railway locomotive in the world; it was built circa 1815 by William Hedley and Timothy Hackworth for Christopher Blackett, the owner of Wylam colliery, west of Newcastle upon Tyne. Wylam Dilly was initially designed for and used on the Wylam Waggonway to transport coal. The four driving wheels are connected by a train of spur wheels driven by a central crankshaft.

Because it proved too heavy for the cast iron plateway in its original form, the locomotive was rebuilt with eight wheels in 1815, but returned to its original design in 1830 after the track was relaid with wrought iron rails. The locomotive was still at work in 1862 when it was moved to Craghead Colliery. After withdrawal it was presented to the Edinburgh Museum of Science and Art in 1883, now called the National Museum of Scotland, where it is currently on display. The first steam locomotive of its class, Puffing Billy, is in the Science Museum in London.

In 1822, the locomotive was temporarily mounted on a keel and served as the engine for a steam paddlewheeler that ferried strikebreakers on the River Tyne.

Until a thorough examination of Wylam Dilly and Puffing Billy was undertaken in 2008, it was thought that Wylam Dilly was the oldest surviving steam locomotive in the world. The research results, released in late 2008, showed that Wylam Dilly was built after Puffing Billy, incorporating improvements on the locomotive's design that were not present in Puffing Billy.

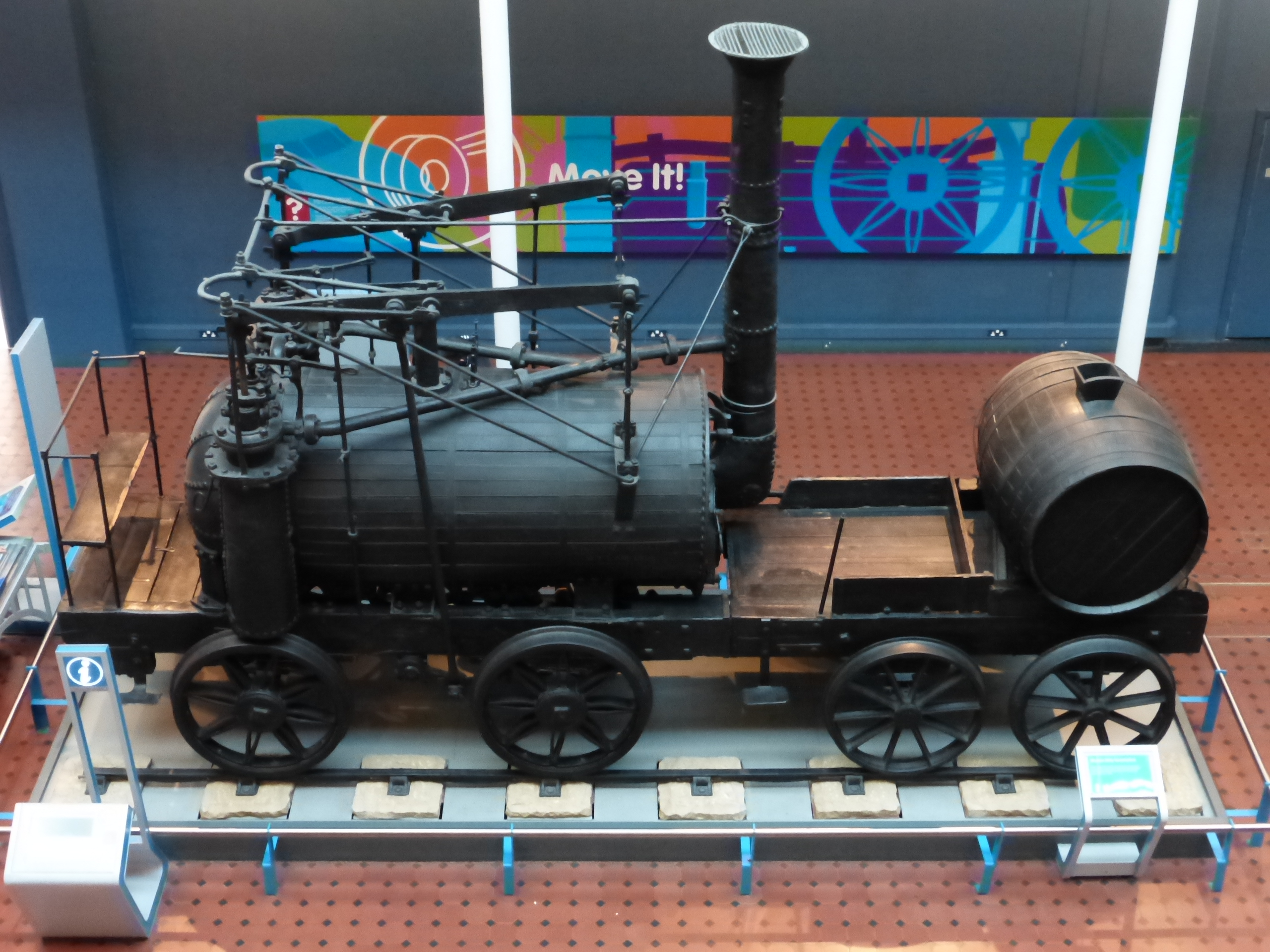
Wylam Dilly at the National Museum of Scotland

== Bibliography ==
- Smith, George Turner (2015). Thomas Hackworth: Locomotive Engineer. Fonthill. pp. 26–32. ISBN 978-1-78155-464-7.
- Bailey, Michael R. (2014). "2: The First Industrial Locomotives: 1812–1815". Loco Motion. The History Press. pp. 23–30. ISBN 978-0-7524-9101-1.
