= Wylam =

Village in Northumberland, England

Coordinates: 54.974°N 1.821°W

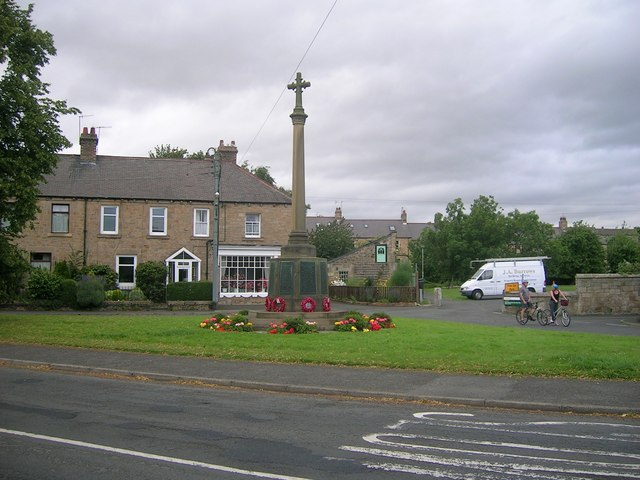
- Wylam War Memorial

- Location within Northumberland
- Population: 1,924 (2011)
- OS grid reference: NZ115645
- Unitary authority: Northumberland
- Ceremonial county: Northumberland
- Region: North East
- Country: England
- Sovereign state: United Kingdom
- Post town: WYLAM
- Postcode district: NE41
- Dialling code: 01661
- Police: Northumbria
- Fire: Northumberland
- Ambulance: North East
- UK Parliament: Hexham

Wylam /ˈwaɪləm/ is a village and civil parish in the county of Northumberland, England. It is located about 10 miles (16 km) west of Newcastle upon Tyne.

It is famous for the being the birthplace of George Stephenson, one of the early railway pioneers. George Stephenson's Birthplace, his cottage, can be found on the north bank of the Tyne 1 mile (1.6 km) east of the village. It is owned by the National Trust.

Wylam has further connections with the early railway pioneers. The steam locomotive engineer Timothy Hackworth, who worked with Stephenson, was also born here. William Hedley who was born in the nearby village of Newburn attended the village school. He later went on to design and manufacture Puffing Billy in 1813, two years before George Stephenson produced his first locomotive Blücher. Christopher Blackett as lord of the manor in the first 30 years of the 19th century provided the entrepreneurial drive that encouraged these engineers.

== History ==
Once an industrial workplace with collieries and an ironworks, it is now a commuting village for Newcastle upon Tyne and Hexham, served by the Tyne Valley line.

The earliest reference to Wylam is in a record of 1158 that records that the settlement belonged to the priory at Tynemouth. It is thought that Guy de Balliol, Lord of Bywell, gave Wylam to the priory in 1085. In 1297, Scots led by William Wallace laid waste to Northumberland from Hexham up to the walls of Newcastle upon Tyneburning Wylam and a number of other towns.The priors of Tynemouth held lands in the village until the dissolution of the monasteries in the 16th century.

The Blackett family have had a long association with the village. In 1659 Christopher Blackett acquired the Lordship of the Manor of Wylam on the death of his wife's father, Thomas Fenwick. Following Christopher's death, his second son, John Blackett, took over the estate and purchased additional land in the area, including two farms at Wylam bought in 1685. These farms formed a modest estate and residence for the Blackett family until the third quarter of the 20th century. The Lordship also included mineral rights within the township. This allowed the family to develop the colliery and further increase their prosperity.

An article in the Newcastle Courant of 17 January 1874 entitled "Our Colliery Villages" paints an unattractive image of the village – 'Wylam is the very worst colliery village that we have yet beheld ...'. The colliery has an important place in the history of the development of the locomotive. It is thought that the Wylam waggonway was opened in 1748 and was therefore one of the earliest waggonways in the North of England. The waggonway linked the colliery to the staiths at Lemington from where the coal was taken down the River Tyne on flat bottomed boats called keels to be loaded on the large coal ships further down the river.

Several famous engineers have had links with the village. George Stephenson was born at a small cottage at Wylam in June 1781. Timothy Hackworth's father was foreman blacksmith at the colliery and his son was born in the village in December 1786. Hackworth together with William Hedley and Jonathan Forster were involved in the development of the locomotive engine at the colliery. Perhaps the most famous of the engines to be developed was the Puffing Billy, which is now housed at The Science Museum in London, followed closely by Wylam Dilly which is on display at the National Museum of Scotland in Edinburgh. Wylam Railway Museum has lots more information on the village's unique place in railway history and is co-located with Wylam Library and has the same opening hours.

The late 18th century was a period of prosperity for the village – the colliery was thriving and an ironworks, a leadshot manufactury and a brewery were all established in the village. In 1864 the ironworks closed. Four years later the colliery was closed. The brewery ceased to operate sometime in the 1870s. This decline in the industry led to a change in the character of the village. By the 20th century the village was almost entirely a residential settlement.

Wylam has approximately 800 households, with a population of 2,100.

== Governance ==
Wylam, for Local Government purposes, comes under Northumberland County Council, a unitary authority.

It is in the parliamentary constituency of Hexham.

== Culture ==
Wylam Winter Tales is a not-for-profit arts and culture festival held in the village every January/February. It features a week of varied events including music, storytelling, film, crafts and history at venues throughout the village. It is funded through small grants, donations and ticket sales and is run by volunteers.

== Geography ==
Wylam is located on the north and south sides of the River Tyne, in Northumberland, England. The riverside walks and country trails surrounding the village are popular for cyclists, runners and walkers alike and the view of Wylam Bridge from Wylam Wood Road towards the southwest is especially dramatic.

To the east of Wylam railway station is the mouth of the small brook known as Stanley Burn, which originates in the southern Prudhoe area and also forms the regional border between Northumberland to the west and the borough of Gateshead (Tyne and Wear). The traditional boundary between Northumberland and County Durham follows the River Tyne from this point.

== Landmarks ==
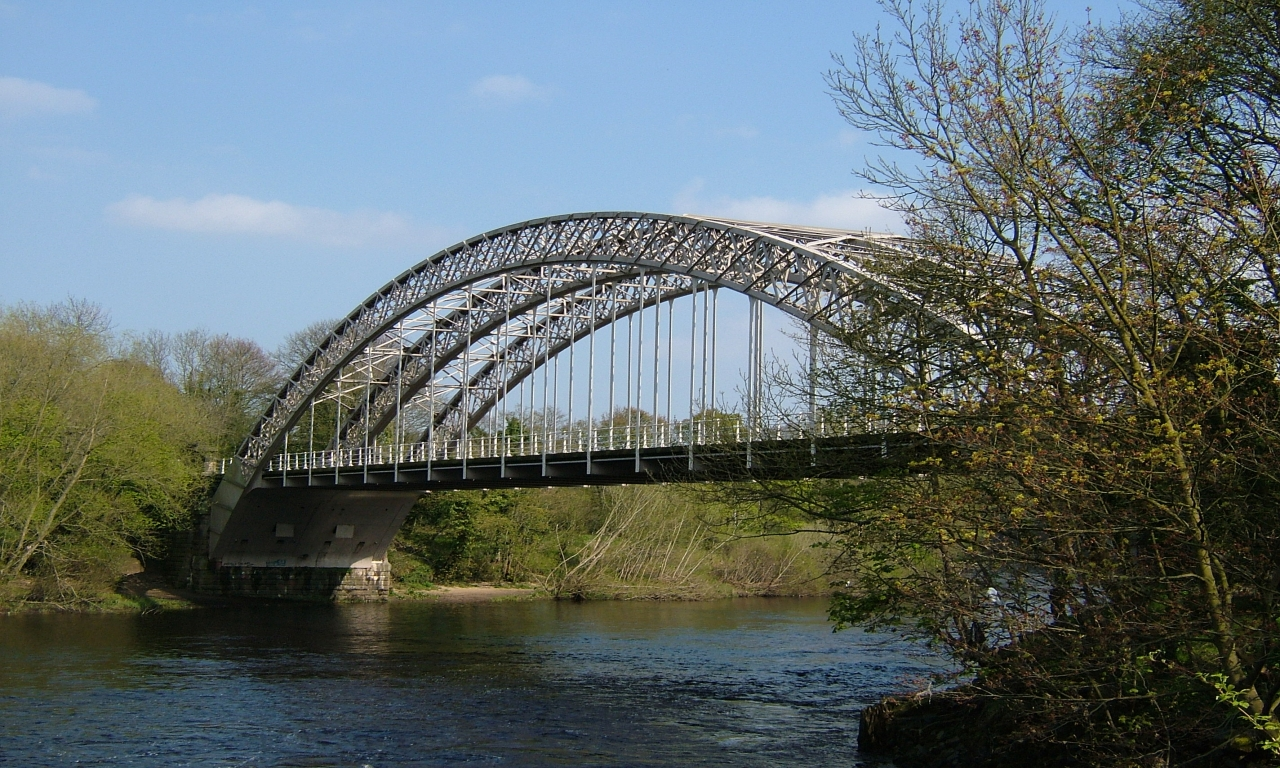
Wylam Railway Bridge as seen from the south bank of the River Tyne

Wylam Railway Bridge (also known as Points Bridge and the Half Moon bridge) is located at Hagg Bank, approximately 1 mile (1.6 km) west of the town. It is a wrought iron bridge built by the Scotswood, Newburn and Wylam Railway Company in 1876 to link the North Wylam Loop with the Newcastle and Carlisle Railway.

The original plan had been to build a bridge with four spans resting on three piers on the river bed. This was rejected by the local coal companies who feared that the construction of the piers on the river bed would disturb the shallow mine workings below, which already suffered from flooding.

The designers found the solution in designing a single-span bridge carrying a double track, without the need for piers. The bridge consists of three parallel wrought iron arches resting on abutments on each bank, with the twin rail decks suspended by 14 wrought iron drop bars. It cost £16,000 to build. The bridge paved the way for new developments in bridge building – Newcastle's Tyne Bridge in 1928 and Sydney Harbour Bridge in 1932, being direct descendants of the design and construction of Hagg's Bridge.

Many of the trains which used the bridge carried coal from the collieries at Newburn and Walbottle westwards to Carlisle.

The line was closed in 1968 and the bridge later purchased by Northumberland County Council. It was restored in 1997 with help from the Heritage Lottery Fund. All the old lead-based paint was removed, requiring the bridge to be wrapped in plastic to prevent polluting the river.

The war memorial, which is a cross about 8 metres (26 ft) in height, stands by the roadside just to the north of Wylam Bridge. The inscriptions and names on the war memorial have been transcribed and published by the North East War Memorials Project.

== Transport ==
Unusually for a rural area, transport in Wylam is mainly Rail and cycle orientated.

Railway The village is served by Wylam railway station on the Tyne Valley Line. The line was opened in 1838, and links the city of Newcastle upon Tyne in Northumberland with Carlisle in Cumberland. The line follows the course of the River Tyne through Northumberland. Passenger services on the line are operated by Northern. The line is also heavily used for goods.

The railway station is on the south bank of the River Tyne. There used to be another railway station in Wylam on the north bank of the river, which was part of the Scotswood, Newburn and Wylam Railway. The line has now closed and the tracks removed, with the North Wylam railway station area now being used as a car park.

Bus The bus service to and from Wylam is poor and many services have been discontinued over the years. There is an hourly service to Newcastle and Hexham provided by Go North East with the X84 service.

Cyclepath After the Scotswood, Newburn and Wylam Railway line was closed the trackwork was removed and the trackbed later converted into a cyclepath. That cyclepath forms part of National Cycle Network Route 72 and starts at Tyne Riverside Country Park at Low Prudhoe. After Wylam it keeps to the north side of the River Tyne, linking Wylam with Newcastle and the coast at Tynemouth. There is another cyclepath on the south side of the river which starts in the car park at Wylam railway station and links Wylam to Gateshead and the coast at South Shields.

== Religious sites ==
Wylam's parish church was built in 1886 and is dedicated to St. Oswin, a Northumbrian saint. Wylam St. Oswin's has a regular Sunday and weekday services. Pre-1886 the villagers of Wylam had to walk to nearby Ovingham to attend church, George and William Hedley, sons of Frances and William, the railway engineer, contributed most of the money needed to build the church so the Anglicans of Wylam could have their own place of worship. The church has six bells with regular Sunday ringing and a practice night on Mondays.

Wylam also has a Methodist chapel, located on Chapel Lane. The chapel was extended in the 1990s to extend the worship and meeting areas, and to also include a kitchen.

Churches in and around Wylam, notably Horsley and Crawcrook, of different denominations have a covenant to work together in the community, to share in youth work and some special services such as Harvest, Remembrance Day and some Christmas and Easter services.

== Notable residents ==
- Basil Bunting – poet
- Antonia Byatt – novelist
- Margaret Drabble – novelist
- Archibald Matthias Dunn – Victorian architect
- Greg Dyke – broadcaster
- Timothy Hackworth – railway pioneer
- William Hedley – railway pioneer
- Helen McCallum - singer-songwriter, academic and writer
- Charles Algernon Parsons – inventor of the steam turbine
- George Stephenson – 'Father of the Railway'
- Ken Traill – (1926–2002), rugby league player and coach, born in Wylam

== Sources ==
- Grundy, John (2022). History of Northumberland. Newcastle upon Tyne: Tyne Bridge Publishing. ISBN 9781838280970.
- Middlebrook, Sydney (1968). Newcastle upon Tyne. Its Growth and Achievement. Wakefield: S.R. Publishers ltd.
