= Timothy Hackworth =

British steam locomotive engineer (1786-1850)

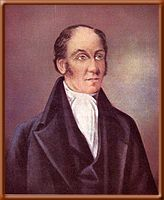
- Born: 22 December 1786; Wylam, Northumberland, England
- Died: 7 July 1850 (aged 63)
- Engineering career
- Discipline: Locomotive engineer

Timothy Hackworth (22 December 1786 – 7 July 1850) was an English steam locomotive engineer who lived in Shildon, County Durham, England and was the first locomotive superintendent of the Stockton and Darlington Railway.

== Youth and early work ==
Timothy Hackworth was born in Wylam in 1786, five years after his fellow railway pioneer George Stephenson had been born in the same village. Hackworth was the eldest son of John Hackworth who occupied the position of foreman blacksmith at Wylam Colliery until his death in 1804; the father had already acquired a considerable reputation as a mechanical worker and boiler maker. At the end of his apprenticeship in 1810 Timothy took over his father's position. Since 1804, the mine owner, Christopher Blackett had been investigating the possibilities of working the mine's short 5-mile (8.0 km) colliery tramroad by steam traction. Blackett set up a four-man working group including himself, William Hedley, the viewer; Timothy Hackworth, the new foreman smith and Jonathan Forster, a "wright". The first step in 1808 was the relaying of the Wylam tramway with cast iron plates, until then a simple timber-way. In 1811, the four-man team began investigating the adhesive properties of smooth wheels using a manually operated carriage propelled by a maximum of four men, and in the same year a single-cylinder locomotive devised by one Waters, reportedly on the Richard Trevithick model, was built and tried for a few months with erratic results.

In the meantime a new dilly, (the term used to designate all locomotives at Wylam), was put in hand and set to work in the autumn of 1812. However even Blackett's new cast iron plateway was found inadequate to sustain the weight of a dilly and the subsequent one built in 1813 was carried on two four-wheeled "power bogies" and it is understood that the first one was similarly rebuilt. On the relaying, around 1830, of the Wylam line with wrought iron edge rails, the two locomotives were reverted to the 4-wheel arrangement, continuing to work until the closing of the line in 1862. What is considered to be the earlier of the two engines, now known as Puffing Billy is conserved at the Science Museum in London; the second Wylam Dilly is in the Royal Scottish Museum in Edinburgh.

Although William Hedley is generally credited with the "design" of the locomotives, there is strong evidence that these issued from the aforementioned joint collaboration in which Christopher Blackett was the driving force with Timothy Hackworth playing a preponderant engineering role. Furthermore, it subsequently fell to Hackworth to maintain the locomotives in running order and improve performance. As time went on, Blackett became increasingly occupied by other outside interests and was often absent, leaving Hedley in charge of the mine; Hackworth found himself in conflictual situations due his Methodist activities and his refusal to work on the Sabbath, until he felt obliged to leave Wylam in 1816.

He was not long in finding other employment at Walbottle Colliery where he took up the same position of foreman blacksmith.

== The Royal George and blastpipe development ==
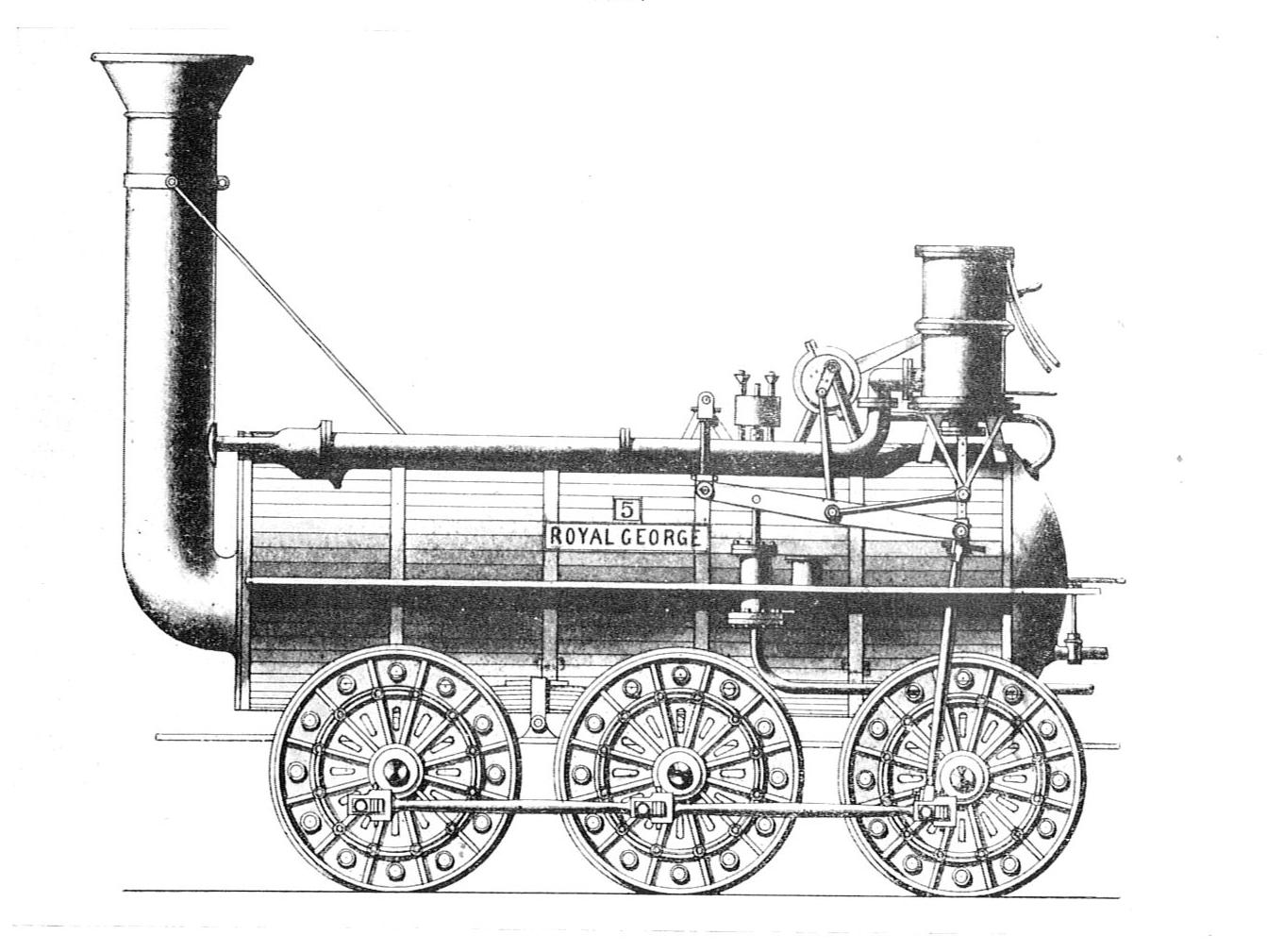
Royal George

In 1824, Hackworth occupied a temporary position as a "borrowed man" or relief manager at the Forth Street factory of Robert Stephenson and Company, whilst Robert was away in South America and George was occupied with the surveying of new railways, notably the Liverpool and Manchester Railway. Hackworth only stayed until the end of that year, following which he returned to Walbottle occupying his time with contract work until, upon the recommendation of George Stephenson, he was appointed on 13 May 1825 to the position of locomotive superintendent of the Stockton and Darlington Railway, a post he held until May 1840.

Hackworth is believed to have been influential in developing the first Stephenson locomotive for the Stockton and Darlington Railway during his time at the Forth Street factory. That locomotive, then named Active and now known as Locomotion No. 1, was delivered to the railway just before the opening ceremony on 27 September 1825. Three more of the same type (Hope, Black Diamond, Diligence) were delivered in the following months and severe operational difficulties made steam locomotives unappealing, thus Hackworth developed an improved design to negate this. This resulted in the Royal George of 1827, an early 0-6-0 locomotive that among many new features incorporated a correctly aligned steam blastpipe. Hackworth is usually acknowledged as the inventor of this concept.

From 1830 onwards the blastpipe was employed by the Stephensons for their updated Rocket and all subsequent new locomotives. Recent letters acquired by the National Railway Museum would appear to confirm Hackworth as the inventor of the device. Since Trevithick's time, it had been common to direct exhaust steam from the cylinders through the chimney using "eductor pipes" for convenience and noise reduction, and its effect on the fire was noted. Regardless, Hackworth was likely the first engineer to fully account for the blast's role in automatically realising the "perfect equilibrium between steam production and usage" in a firetube boiler and consider the blastpipe a distinct device, focusing on its proportions, nozzle size, positioning and precise alignment.

== Sans Pareil and the Rainhill trials ==
In 1829 the Liverpool and Manchester Railway, the world's first "Inter-City" railway, was under construction. There was a large potential for both passenger and goods traffic. However all locomotives built to date, including those for the Stockton and Darlington, had been intended for slow freight, with any passenger service handled by single horse-drawn coaches. It was clear that any future locomotives would have to be more versatile. Matters were further complicated by the news of the problems encountered on the S&D, which led to considerable debate over the ideal motive power. George Stephenson, the line's civil engineer, was firmly in favour of steam traction and asked for a report from Hackworth, who confirmed the locomotives' difficulties while working to resolve them. To settle the debate the directors set up a competition to be held at Rainhill, resulting in three serious contestants. Hackworth, with his very limited resources, entered the 0-4-0 locomotive Sans Pareil. It was officially deemed overweight, but was ultimately allowed to compete. A faulty cylinder casting led to steam leaks and premature withdrawal.

Stephenson's Rocket was the winner as the only locomotive that stayed the course whilst fully complying with the rules. In the event, none of the contestants fully answered the railway's requirements. Hackworth stayed on after the event, repairing Sans Pareil and showed that it was a capable machine. After this the L&M management purchased the locomotive, subsequently reselling it at a loss to the Bolton and Leigh Railway where it worked until 1844. As Ahrons notes, the vertical cylinders would have given considerable hammer blow at speed and made it unsuited for passenger service on the track in the long term. Nevertheless it performed very capably, largely due to the carefully designed and tuned blastpipe.

== Later productions ==
In addition to working on the Stockton and Darlington, Hackworth set up his own business in which his son, John Wesley Hackworth, fully participated. This business produced a variety of machinery; notably, he built the first locomotive to run in Russia for the Tsarskoye Selo Railway at Shildon in 1836, of which his son was responsible for the safe delivery and preliminary trials. In 1838, the Samson was built for the Albion Mines Railway in Nova Scotia and was one of the first engines to run in Canada.

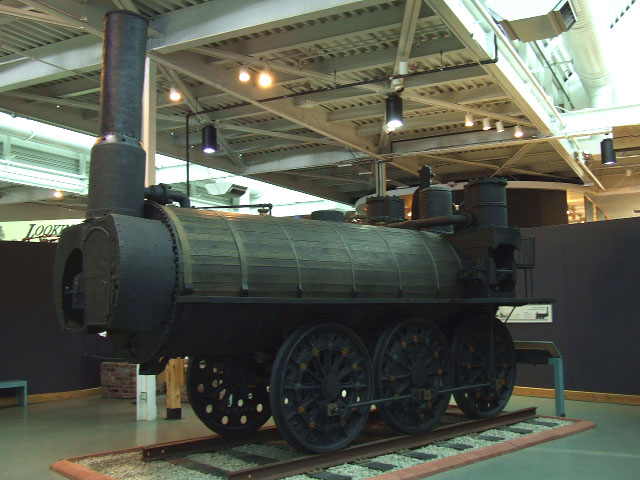
Samson, preserved at the Nova Scotia Museum of Industry

One of his 1833 apprentices, Daniel Adamson, would further developed his boiler designs and become a successful manufacturer, influencing the inception of the Manchester Ship Canal.

Hackworth's last new locomotive design was the 2-2-2 Sans Pareil II, a "demonstrator" of 1849. This locomotive was a development of the Jenny Lind type with 6 ft 6 in (1,980 mm) driving wheels, 1,188 sq ft (110.4 m^{2}) of heating surface and a partially-welded boiler. It performed very well in terms of fuel efficiency and load-hauling performance. Hackworth was so satisfied that he issued a public challenge to Robert Stephenson to test it against his latest York, Newcastle and Berwick Railway locomotive, No. 190. Nothing resulted from this and Hackworth died the following year.

== Family ==
Hackworth had three sons and six daughters. His eldest son, John Wesley Hackworth (1820–1891), carried on the business after the death of his father. J. W. Hackworth patented the Hackworth valve gear in 1859.

== Legacy ==
Today he has a school named after him in his hometown of Shildon where the pupils annually learn of Timothy Hackworth and his work. His home was also turned into a museum, which has since been renovated and an annexe of the National Railway Museum has been built nearby. The 1839 Hackworth locomotive Samson is preserved in Canada at the Nova Scotia Museum of Industry in Stellarton, Nova Scotia. Hackworth Park in Shildon was named in his honour as was Timothy Hackworth Drive in Darlington. Hackworth Close (a street in Newthorpe, Nottinghamshire) was also named in his honour.

== See also ==
- 1786 in rail transport
- Locomotives of the Stockton and Darlington Railway

== Bibliography ==
- Kirtley, Allan; Longbottom, Patricia; Blackett, Martin (2013). A History of the Blacketts. ISBN 978-0-9575675-0-4. Archived from the original on 23 June 2014.
- Young, Robert (1975) [1923]. Timothy Hackworth and the Locomotive. Shildon.
- Smith, George Turner (2015). Thomas Hackworth: Locomotive Engineer. Fonthill. ISBN 978-1-78155-464-7.
