= William Hedley =

English inventor and industrial engineer (1779-1843)

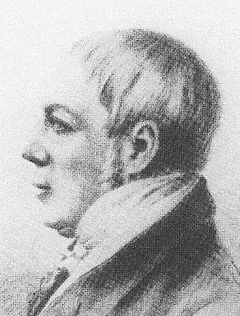
- Born: 13 July 1779; Newburn, England
- Died: 9 January 1843 (aged 63)
- Occupation: Colliery viewer

William Hedley (13 July 1779 – 9 January 1843) was an English industrial engineer and inventor, born in Newburn, near Newcastle upon Tyne. He was one of the leading industrial engineers of the early 19th century, and was instrumental in several major innovations in early railway development. While working as a 'viewer' or manager at Wylam Colliery near Newcastle upon Tyne, he built the first practical steam locomotive which relied simply on the adhesion of iron wheels on iron rails.

== Early locomotives ==
Before Hedley's time, such locomotives were far too heavy for the track that was then available. While most lines used cable haulage with stationary engines, various other schemes had been tried. William Chapman at the Butterley Company in 1812, attempted to use a steam engine which hauled itself along a cable, while, at the same company, Brunton had produced the even less successful "mechanical traveller", or Steam Horse.

However, in 1812, Matthew Murray and John Blenkinsop had produced the first twin cylinder steam locomotive, Salamanca, for Middleton Colliery railway near Leeds, using a pinion engaging with teeth along the iron edge rails track (the first rack railway). This had been the first steam locomotive railway to work successfully, but the system was complex and expensive.

== Hedley's improvements ==
=== First locomotive ===
Hedley felt that if the pairs of wheels were connected, as with Richard Trevithick's engines, if one pair began to slip, it would be counteracted by the other. The mine owner, Christopher Blackett had just replaced the wooden waggonway with iron flanged 'L' section plate rails. Hedley first constructed a test carriage operated by manpower, to test the adhesion under various loads. He then used it as the chassis for a locomotive constructed to Trevithick's pattern with a single cylinder and a simple straight through fire tube to the boiler. This engine was not satisfactory. Its motion was erratic, because of the single cylinder, and it produced insufficient steam.

=== Puffing Billy and Wylam Dilly ===
He built a second engine, with the assistance of the, later to be famous, Timothy Hackworth, his foreman smith, and his principal engine wright, Jonathan Forster, using the 1812 twin cylinder plan of John Blenkinsop and Matthew Murray and a return flue boiler. This was the famous steam locomotive, Puffing Billy which first ran in 1813 and is now preserved at the Science Museum in London. Its success encouraged them to build a second engine Wylam Dilly, which is now in the National Museum of Scotland in Edinburgh. In the same year, his system for using a coupling between the wheels was patented.

=== Modifications ===
However, there was still considerable wear to the track, and the engines were rebuilt using twin four-wheeled bogies, introduced in Blackwell's design mentioned above. Initially the wheels were without flanges for use on the flanged plate rails. In about 1830 the line was relaid with the stronger edge rails, and both locomotives reverted to their original pattern, but with flanged wheels, which is how they are today. Both locos remained in active service until 1862.

== Death ==
Hedley died in 1843 at Burnhopeside Hall, near Lanchester and was buried at Newburn parish church. Four sons survived him and his descendants remained heavily involved in the coal-mining industry until nationalisation in the 1940s. In 1971, a charitable foundation was set up in the Hedley name, with assets based on the compensation from nationalisation.
