= T. Rees Thomas =

Australian Congregationalist minister

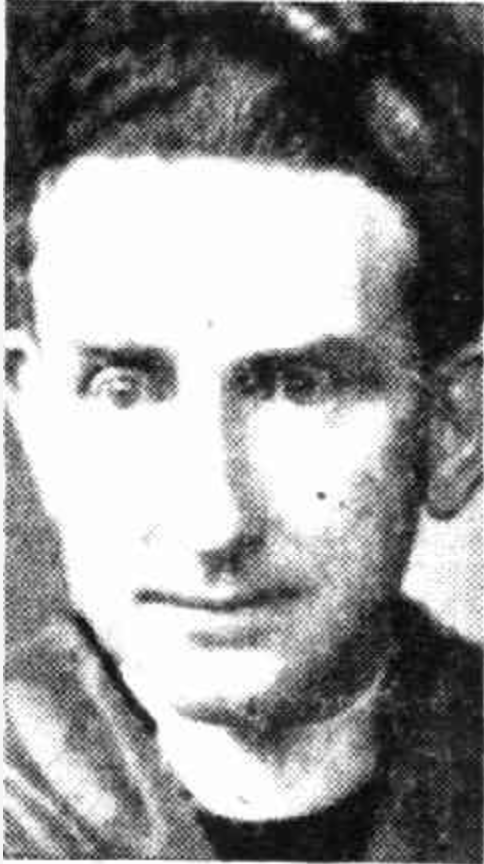
Rev. T. Rees Thomas, 1954

Thomas "Tom" Rees Thomas MBE (1910–1993), generally referred to as T. Rees Thomas, often Rees-Thomas, was an Australian Congregationalist minister.

== History ==
Rees Thomas was born in Pontardulzus (perhaps Pontarddulais), Wales, and with his parents bootmaker Thomas Thomas (1876 – c. 1 December 1953) and Sarah Jane Thomas (1876 – c. 1 December 1952), and their family emigrated to Queensland in 1913. It is likely he grew up in Blackstone, a suburb of Ipswich, Queensland with a strong Welsh association. His parents for many years lived in Thomas Street, Blackstone, and the Thomas family were active members of the Blackstone United Welsh Church by 1926.

Rees Thomas was educated in Queensland, then studied for the Congregationalist ministry for five years at Parkin College, Adelaide, where he was conferred with the L.Th., and was conducting services at the Church of Christ in Kadina, South Australia in March 1934. He was then conferred with a Diploma in Divinity by the Melbourne College of Divinity, with which Parkin was associated. Late that year, in company of Rev. E. S. Kiek, principal of Parkin Theological College, travelled by rail to Perth, Western Australia for a three-month probation with Subiaco and Mt. Hawthorn Congregationalist churches. He was ordained there, and served from December 1934 to January 1942.

He served at Clayton Church, Kensington South Australia from 1942 to 1947, in which year he was conferred B.D. by the Melbourne College of Divinity. Late in 1947 he returned to Queensland, where he succeeded Rev. Percival Watson as pastor of the City Congregational Church, Brisbane, being inducted in February 1948 by his old principal Rev. E. S. Kiek and distinguished wife Rev. Winifred Kiek. He served with distinction until 1981. Following the creation of the Uniting Church in Australia, he served as minister-in-association at St Andrew's Uniting Church, Brisbane. He died in 1993 while holidaying in New Zealand. He was cremated and his ashes were buried in the Ipswich General Cemetery.

== Other positions ==
- President, Australia and New Zealand Congregational Union, 1971–1973
- Chairman Congregational Union of SA 1947–1948
- Chairman Queensland Congregational Union 1951, 1959, 1964–65, 1977.
- Moderator of the Queensland Synod of the Uniting Church in Australia 1978
- He was president, Queensland Council of Churches in 1953.

== Other interests ==
Rees Thomas was an enthusiast for Welsh culture: while at Brisbane City Church he was involved in Cymanfa Ganu singing festivals.

He was a crusader against gambling: SP bookmaking was a particular target of his sermons, and he drew adverse criticism for his targeting of bridge clubs who played for cash prizes.

== Recognition ==
Rees Thomas was in 1965 awarded an MBE for services to the Congregational Church and the community.

A chapel at St Andrews Uniting Church in Brisbane commemorates the work done by Rees Thomas and his wife Ruby.

== Bibliography ==
- Thomas, T. Rees Prayers for People We Take for Granted Boolarong Publications, Brisbane 1991

== Family ==
Rees Thomas had a sister Annie Grace Thomas (1907–1987) and three brothers: William (1905–1930), David (1907–1974) and John (1915–1953), all living in Queensland.

Rees Thomas married Ruby Fanny Byerley (1915–1989) of North Adelaide in Perth on 6 February 1937. Their children included:

- son (24 January 1944 – )
- daughter (3 April 1947 – )

Many of the Thomas family are buried at the Blackstone cemetery.
