= Charles Watts =

Charles or Charlie Watts may refer to:

== Sportsmen ==
- Charlie Watts (footballer) (1870–1924), English goalkeeper
- Charles Watts (cricketer, born 1894) (1894–1979), English right-handed batsman
- Charles Watts (cricketer, born 1905) (1905–1985), English wicket-keeper
- Charlie Watts (baseball), American Negro league second baseman

== Writers ==
- Charles Watts (secularist) (1836–1906), English writer, publisher and secularist
- Charles Albert Watts (1858–1946), English editor, publisher and secularist; son of above
- Charlie Watts (fascist) (1903–1971), English memoirist and member of British Union of Fascists
- Charles DeWitt Watts (1917–2004), African American surgeon, activist and memoirist
- Charles Henry Watts II (1926–2001), American academic author and president of Bucknell University

== Others ==
- Charlie Watts (1941–2021), English rock drummer with the Rolling Stones
- Charles Watts (before 1650–after 1682), English apothecary who apprenticed James Sherard
- Charles Christopher Watts (1877–1958), English Anglican bishop
- Charles Watts (before 1890–after 1937), American defense attorney for Scottsboro Boys
- C. C. Watts (pastor) (Charles Cameron Watts, 1895–1965), Australian Congregationalist minister
- Charles Watts (1912–1966), American character actor in 1965's Baby the Rain Must Fall
- Charlie Watts, American 1996 Democratic nominee for Georgia's 7th district, see electoral history of Bob Barr

== See also ==
- Charles Watts Memorial Library, Canadian collective at The Kootenay School of Writing (KSW)
