= City Congregational Church, Brisbane =

Demolished church in Brisbane, Queensland

City Congregational Church (former)
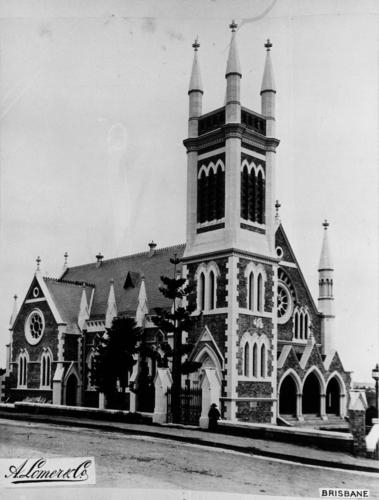
- Wickham Terrace church, c. 1889, used by the Congregational Church from 1942 to 1960
- City Congregational Church (former)
- 27°27′51″S 153°01′50″E
- Address: 407 Adelaide Street, Brisbane, Queensland
- Country: Australia
- Previous denomination: Congregational

History
- Status: Church hall (1927 – 1942); Department of Munitions and Supplies (1942 – ????)
- Founded: 1927
- Founder: Rev. Percival Watson

Architecture
- Architectural type: Church hall
- Closed: 1942 (as a church)
- Demolished: c. 1960s

City Congregational Church was a church building of the Congregational Church at 407 Adelaide Street, Brisbane, Queensland, Australia, which replaced the Wharf Street Congregational Church, Brisbane.

== History ==
=== Church hall ===
Construction commenced in 1927 while Sunday services were temporarily held in the Constitutional Club rooms and His Majesty's Theatre.

On Saturday 14 January 1928, the church hall at 409 Adelaide Street was opened. Costing £19,000, it had two floors. The ground floor had shops, offices and social rooms, while the upper floor was a large hall. On 27 May 1928 the new pipe organ was used in services for the first time. The intention was to use the hall for services while funds were raised over the following two to three years to enable the construction of the church itself on the Queen Street side of the property. However, during the Great Depression, the funds to build the church were not raised and services continued to be conducted in the church hall.

=== World War II and Wickham Terrace ===
World War II began, and in September 1941 evening services at the City Congregational Church were shifted to the late afternoon to accommodate the black-out. In January 1942, the church hall was commandeered by the Australian Government Department of Munitions and Supplies. The Albert Street Methodist Church offered their church as a venue for services for the Congregational community.

In October 1942, the congregation found a new home in a former Presbyterian church on Wickham Terrace. This church had been acquired in 1905 for extensions to Brisbane's Central Railway Station (the Presbyterian congregation established St Andrew's Presbyterian Church to replace their Wickham Terrace church). As the extensions to the railway station did not take place immediately, the railways used the building as for storage of records until 1929, after which they leased it out as a gymnasium until 1941. The Congregational community leased the Wickham Terrace church building from 1942 to 1960, after which the church was demolished for road works.

== Ministers ==
The initial minister was Rev. Percival Watson, who had transferred with the congregation from the former Wharf Street church. He served (at Wharf Street, Adelaide Street and Wickham Terrace) for 22 years until he left in May 1947 to take up the ministry of the Pitt Street Congregational Church in Sydney.

T. Rees Thomas was minister from 1947 to 1981. He was inducted in February 1948 by his old principal Rev. E. S. Kiek and distinguished wife Rev. Winifred Kiek.
