= Joseph Robertson =

Joseph or Joe Robertson may refer to:

== Sportsmen ==
- Joe Robertson (footballer) (born 1977), Scottish footballer
- Joe Robertson (ice hockey) (born 1948), Canadian hockey player

== Others ==
- Joseph Robertson (priest) (1726–1802), English clergyman and writer
- Joseph Robertson (pastor) (1849–1921), Australian Congregationalist minister
- Joseph Clinton Robertson (c. 1787–1852), pseudonym Sholto Percy, Scottish patent agent and periodical editor
- Joseph Robertson (historian) (1810–1866), Scottish scholar
- Joseph Robertson (OHSU), president of Oregon Health & Science University
- Joseph Gibb Robertson (1820–1899), Scottish-born merchant, farmer and political figure in Quebec
- Joe Robertson (politician), British politician
- Robbie Robertson (character), a fictional character in the Spider-Man series
