= Teece =

Teece is an English language surname. Notable persons with this name include:

- Ashley H. Teece (1879–1943), Congregationalist minister in Australia, son of Richard Teece
- Cecil Teece (1864–1917), politician in New South Wales, Australia, brother of William
- David Teece (born 1948), US-based organizational theorist
- Richard Teece (1847–1928), Australian actuary and general manager of the Australian Mutual Provident Society
- William Teece (1845–1890), a politician in New South Wales, Australia, brother of Cecil
