= Lord Gordon =

Lord Gordon may refer to the following British titles or people:

- Lord Gordon of Badenoch
- Lord Gordon of Strathblane (1936–2020), or known as James Gordon, Baron Gordon of Strathblane: a British life peer, Scottish businessman and manager
- Lord Gordon of Drumearn, or known as Edward Gordon, Baron Gordon of Drumearn (1814–79), Scottish politician and judge
- Lord Gordon-Gordon (c. 1840–74)
- Lord George Gordon (1751–93)
- Lord Nicholas Gordon-Lennox (1931–2004)
- Lord Douglas Gordon (1851–88)

== See also ==
- Gordon Lord
