= Thomas Hope (pastor) =

Thomas Hope (1846 – 20 November 1916) was an English Congregationalist minister who had a career in Australia.

== History ==
Hope was educated at Owen's College, Manchester, and studied for the ministry at Lancashire Independent College. His first appointment was in 1872 to the Congregational Church in Bungay, Suffolk.

In late 1873 he left for South Australia aboard the Stratton Audley, and was in May 1874 appointed to Clayton Congregational Church, in Kensington, South Australia, as successor to Eliezer Griffiths who had departed for Britain and America, and William Harcus, who had embarked on a career in journalism.

During his tenure at the Clayton Church the congregation grew to such an extent that a new, larger church building was called for, and was built within a few years and officially opened on 17 May 1882. The Sunday-school was also steadily growing in numbers, and a Young Men's Society and Young Christians' Union were founded and flourished. Hope resigned in August 1890, after sixteen years at Clayton.

He moved to Sydney in September 1890 to take the ministry of the Congregational Church at Waverley.

In July 1894 he commenced at Hindmarsh Congregational Church where he served for 14 years, and was also responsible for oversight of the Henley Beach Congregational Church, which was served by lay preachers.

On his retirement he was made honorary pastor. His successor was Rev. Percival Watson. He also served Clayton Church in various capacities, filling the positions of Moderator and acting pastor when the Church was without a minister, and was made honorary pastorate for life in February 1916.

For many years he was the Secretary of the Parkin Congregational Mission, and of the Union College.

On the death of his brother-in-law, the Rev. John Lloyd of Wallaroo on 29 October 1904, Hope served at his church until a replacement could be found.

== Family ==
He married Janet Frew (1847 – 14 August 1934) in Adelaide on 19 August 1890. They had no children. Their last home was on Grange Road, Hindmarsh.

Augustine Stow, son of Rev. T. Q. Stow, married her sister Elizabeth Augusta Frew (1846– ) in 1867
Rev. John Lloyd married her sister Ellen Hodge née Frew ( – ) in 1878. She was the widow of Matthew Henry Hodge
