= William Sanders =

William Sanders may refer to:

- William Sanders (basketball) (born 1972), American basketball player
- William Sanders (businessman) (born 1941), American real estate businessman and developer
- William Sanders (geologist) (1799–1875), English merchant
- William Sanders (organist) (1867–1955), South Australian choirmaster, organist and music columnist
- William Sanders (pastoralist) (1801–1880), Australian pastoralist and businessman
- William Sanders (politician) (1871–1941), British Labour Party politician
- William Sanders (statistician) (1942–2017), senior research fellow with the University of North Carolina
- William Sanders (UK politician) (1871–1941), British Labour Party politician
- William Sanders (writer) (1942–2017), American speculative fiction writer
- William David Sanders (1951–1999), U.S. teacher and victim of Columbine High School massacre
- William Edward Sanders (1883–1917), New Zealand Victoria Cross recipient
- William Evan Sanders (1919–2021), American bishop
- William H. Sanders, American educator
- William J. Sanders, American paleontologist
- William P. Sanders (1833–1863), American military officer
- William T. Sanders (1926–2008), anthropologist specialized in archaeology of Mesoamerica
- William Bliss Sanders (1841–1896), architect based in Nottingham
- William Rutherford Sanders (1828–1881), Scottish pathologist
- Bill Sanders (1930-2011), American political cartoonist
- Billy Sanders (1955–1985), Australian international speedway rider
- Billy C. Sanders (born 1936), U.S. Navy sailor and Master Chief Petty Officer of the Navy

== See also ==
- Willy Sanders (disambiguation)
- William Saunders (disambiguation)
