= William Saunders =

William or Bill Saunders may refer to:

== Science ==
- William Saunders (physician) (1743–1817), Scottish physician, first president of Royal Medical and Chirurgical Society
- William Wilson Saunders (1809–1879), British entomologist
- William Saunders (botanist) (1822–1900), American horticulturist and landscape designer
- William Saunders (scientist) (1836–1914), Canadian pharmacist, entomologist, and plant breeder
- William Lawrence Saunders (1856–1931), American mining engineer and chairman of Ingersoll Rand
- William Edwin Saunders (1861–1943), Canadian naturalist

== Sports ==
- Bud Saunders (William Howard "Bud" Saunders 1884–1967), American football and basketball coach
- William B. Saunders (1896–1977), American football, basketball, and baseball coach
- Bill Saunders (1898–1950), American college football coach
- Billy Saunders (born 1937), Canadian ice hockey player
- Billy Joe Saunders (born 1989), British boxer
- William Saunders (footballer) (fl. 1900), football goalkeeper for Burslem Port Vale

== Other ==
- William Saunders (died 1570), MP for Gatton and Surrey
- William Saunders (builder) (1767–1861), American architect
- William Saunders (poet) (1806–1851), Welsh poet writing in Welsh
- William Saunders (Liberal politician) (1823–1895), British newspaper publisher and Liberal Party politician
- William Saunders (photographer) (1832–1892), British photographer
- William Gualbert Saunders (1837–1923), English designer of stained glass
- William L. Saunders (1835–1891), colonel in the U.S. Civil War and North Carolina secretary of state
- William Penman Saunders (1912–1980), business manager and politician in Newfoundland, Canada
- William U. Saunders, barber, lawyer and politician in the United States

== See also ==
- William Sanders (disambiguation)
