= Eliezer Griffiths =

Welsh Congregationalist (1827–1920)

Eliezer Griffiths (3 February 1827 – 21 April 1920) was a Welsh Congregationalist minister with a significant career in Australia and America, where he died.

== History ==
Griffiths was born in Lampeter, Ceredigion, Wales, a son of Rev. G. Griffiths, minister of Mynydd Seion, Newport, Wales and his wife Maria Griffiths (c. 1794 – 18 December 1866). He was educated at New College and served the church at Tenby, Wales for twelve years, then moved to Australia.

He served from 1861 to 1865 at Port Denison, Queensland, where he served in several different churches, including the Church of England. He may have served briefly at Bowen, Queensland, but in 1866 moved to South Australia to take over the Clayton Congregational Church in Kensington, South Australia, recently vacated by William Harcus. He left South Australia for England in December 1872.

He married Isabella Bell (c. 1839 – 1882). They had seven children. He died in Omaha, Nebraska.
