= A. C. Newbury =

Australian Congregationalist minister

Alfred Charles Newbury (1886 – 23 September 1948) was an Australian Congregationalist minister.

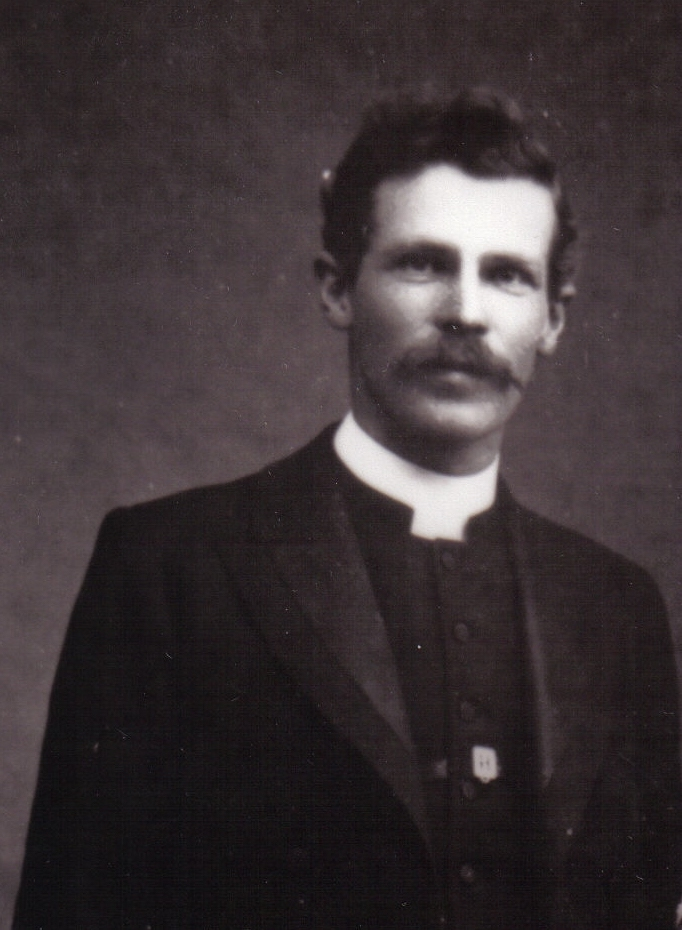
Rev. Alfred Charles Newbury

== History ==
Newbury was one of five sons of Samuel Newbury (1854–1930) and his wife Jessie Susannah Newbury née Dowsett ( –1940). Samuel was the headmaster of Albert Park Grammar School in Melbourne, and it is likely Alfred's early education was at that school, followed by Geelong College in 1897 and 1898, at which time his address was 180 Bellarine St, Geelong, then Queen’s College at Melbourne University. He studied for the ministry at the Victorian Congregational College from 1908.

He served the Congregational Church from 1910 at North Richmond then the Quarry Hill church, Bendigo and was ordained in 1911. He served as pastor at Ascot Vale from April 1914 to June 1921, followed by Camberwell for three years, and in July 1923 transferred from Camberwell to Chatswood Congregational Church, in Sydney, where he served for the next seven years, before being called to the Clayton Congregational Church at Norwood, Adelaide, where he served from 1930 to 1940.

He took over the Henley Beach church in October 1940 following the Rev. Dr E. F. W. Swan's transfer to Surrey Hills, Victoria. He served there for seven years, then retired due to ill health and died a year later.

== Other appointments ==
- He was Secretary of the Victorian Congregational Men’s Association.
- While at Ascot Vale he served as chaplain to the Australian Army Gunnery Camp at Maribyrnong.
- While at Chatswood he acted as Secretary of the New South Wales Congregational Union Young People's Department.

== Bibliography ==
- Newbury, A. C. The Encircling Love: Hymns and verses (Kensington S. Aust, Clayton Congregational Church, 1931)
