= Wharf Street Congregational Church, Brisbane =

Wharf Street Congregational Church
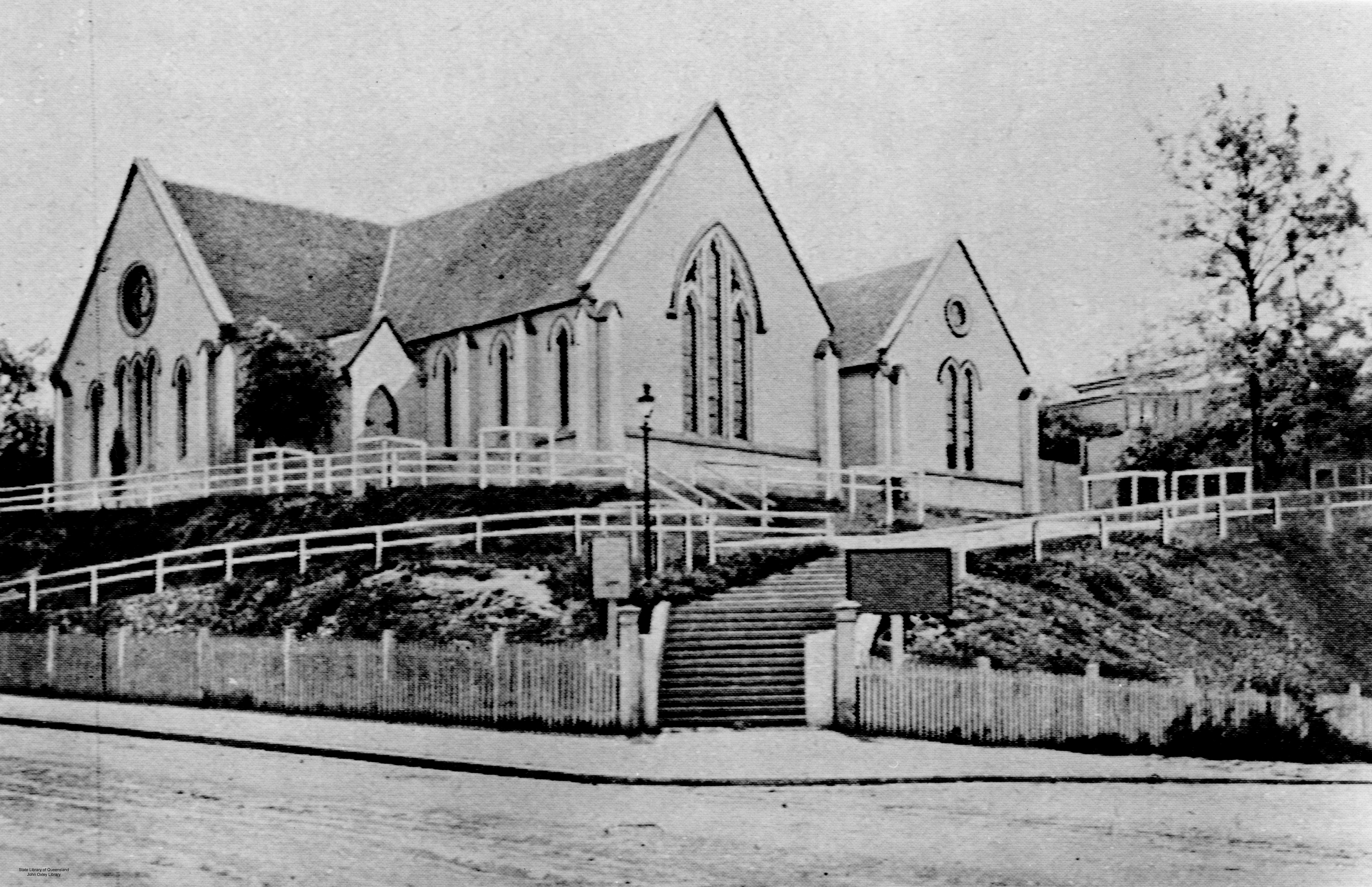
- Wharf Street Congregational Church Brisbane, circa 1909

- Location within Queensland
- 27.46466°S 153.02948°E
- Location: Wharf Street, Brisbane, Queensland
- Country: Australia

History
- Founded: 1860

The Wharf Street Congregational Church was a Congregational church built in 1860 on the corner of Wharf Street and Adelaide Street, Brisbane, Queensland, Australia. The church was demolished in 1928. It was the first Congregational church in Brisbane.

== Early Congregationalism in Brisbane ==
It is believed that the first Congregationalists arrived on the Fortitude on 21 January 1849, being the first of three ships of free immigrants sent to this district by the Rev. Dr. John Dunmore Lang, whose advice to the immigrants was to combine for Christian fellowship and worship rather than establish separate denominations. In March 1850, the United Evangelical Church was created, combining those of Presbyterian, Baptist, and Congregational beliefs, under the ministry of the Rev. Charles Stewart (chaplain of the Fortitude).

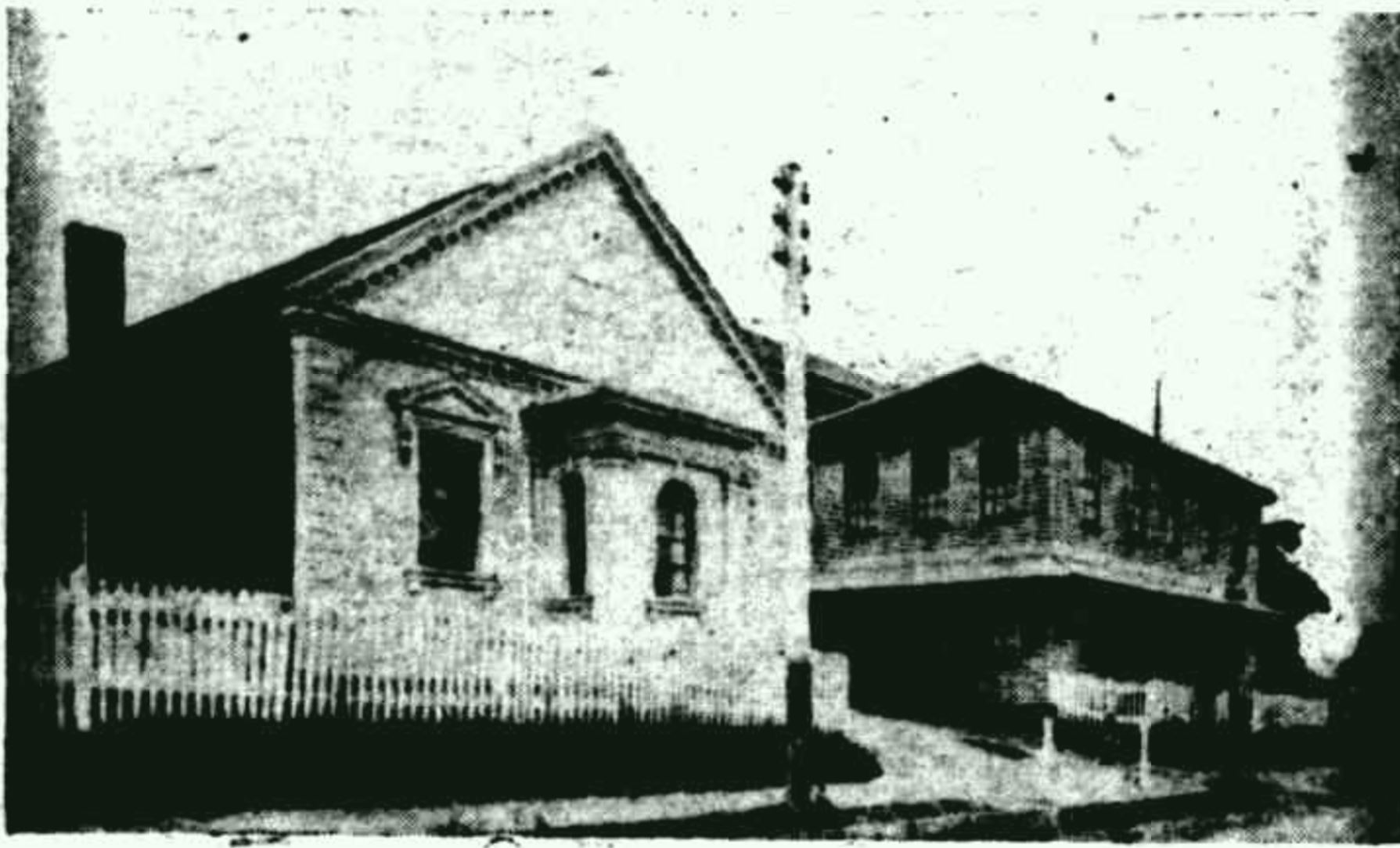
Dr Lang's United Church, William Street

At first the congregation worshipped in the courthouse, but later purchased land fronting William and George Streets (in 2010 the Lands Office building occupies the site) and erected a brick church. However, while a united church served their early needs, the Baptists desired to have their own church and the united church was sold for £1500 and the proceeds divided between the three denominations, providing the basis for establishing three separate churches: Wharf Street Congregational Church, Wharf Street Baptist Church and Creek Street Presbyterian Church.

== Rev. George Wight ==
In 1858 the Rev. George Wight arrived at Brisbane from Edinburgh. He had been sent by the London Colonial Missionary Society to establish a Congregational Church in Brisbane. However, his immediate challenge was to find a venue for the congregation to meet for worship. He wrote of this period: "One of the difficulties that met us at the threshold was the impossibility of procuring, on any terms whatever, a proper place for holding meetings. There was only one place in the town (the hall of the School of Arts) where a hundred people could be comfortably accommodated and that was occupied by the Presbyterian congregation under the charge of the Rev.C. Ogg. We were therefore, fain to occupy a rickety loft—Mr. Binney called it facetiously an 'upper room' —reached by a rickety trap ladder, and used on week days as a schoolroom. The dilapidated wood building overhung a dark, sluggish creek, which meandered through the centre of the town, and after tropical showers the approach to it was almost impassable."

In 1859 the Rev. T. Bell, pastor of the United Presbyterian Church, died, and the building he had occupied was rented for a time for use for Congregational meetings. Meanwhile, funds were being raised to add to the £500 received from the sale of the united church property.

== The church building ==
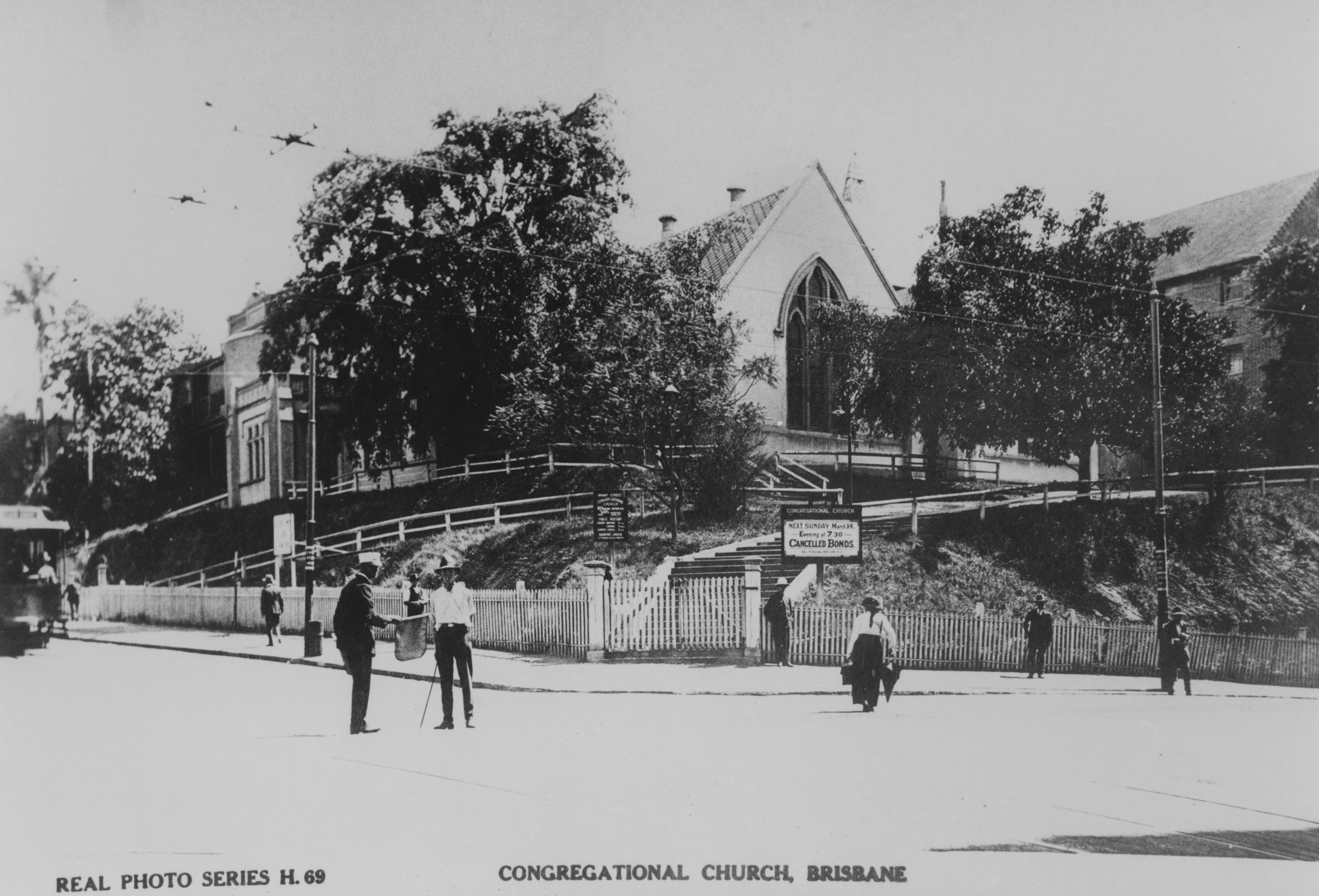
Wharf Street Congregational Church, 1920

In May 1859, the congregation was ready to establish their own church building and proceeded to buy land on the corner of Wharf and Adelaide streets for £260. Charles Tiffin, the architect, designed a brick church which was built by Joshua Jeays. The total cost (including the land) was £1498 3s 7d, which was not greatly more than the funds of £1429 12s 2d which had been raised or promised.

Charles Tiffin was the Colonial Architect and designed many of Brisbane's important buildings, many of which were also built by Joshua Jeays, e.g. Old Government House. So, although the first church was not very large, it was considered to have an imposing structure, based on simple early English lines.

The church was opened on 10 June 1860 and the first morning service in the new church was conducted by Rev. Wight.

== Rev. Edward Griffith ==
Family reasons forced Rev. Wight's return to Scotland and in September 1860, Rev. Edward Griffith became the pastor of the church. During his 30 years ministry, the congregation grew from 48 to over 700 people. He oversaw the establishment of a number of branch churches in the suburbs.

In 1872, the church building had become too small for the congregation and it was enlarged to a seating capacity of 400 people, about double its original capacity. John Petrie was architect and builder of the additions. In 1883 there were further additions: a new schoolroom, better seating accommodation, choir railings, and the replacement of the wooden floor with an asphalt floor (which defeated the white ants and kept the church much cooler in summer).

Rev. Griffith resigned as pastor in February 1889 due to his failing health. Rev. William Scott briefly took up the ministry but then moved to Sydney, forcing Rev. Griffith to return to the ministry.

In 1890 a new large pipe organ was installed.

Rev. Griffith died in 1891 and was buried in Toowong Cemetery.

== Later years ==
The church was without a minister until 19 March 1893, when the Rev. John Routledge Wolstenholme commenced. However, he died soon after on 25 May, and was buried at Toowong Cemetery, beside the grave of the Rev. Griffith. Forty years later in September 1943, the ashes of his wife Mrs Wolstenholme were sent from England (where she had lived as a widow) to be buried with her husband in Toowong Cemetery.

Subsequent ministers were:

- Rev. Hugh Jones (May 1895 - April 1903)
- Rev. Loyal Lincoln Wirt (May 1904 - Oct 1907)
- Rev. W.H. Lewis (June 1908 - Aug 1915) who proposed (apparently unsuccessfully) that the church be named after St Barnabas
- Rev. Stanley Morrison (Oct 1916 - February 1923)
- Rev. George Rayner (initially March 1923 - July 1923 and then March 1924 - February 1925)
- Rev. Percival Watson (commencing July 1925 and then transferring to the City Congregational Church, Brisbane on closure of the Wharf Street church)

== The sale and demolition ==
By 1923, the church again became too small for the congregation's needs and, in addition, traffic noise (including the noise of the trams) was becoming a problem during church services.

In December 1924, it was agreed to sell the church property to the neighbouring St John's Cathedral to facilitate the expansion of the cathedral precinct with the condition that the Congregationalists had two years to establish a new church. In January 1925, they purchased the property Inchcolm in Wickham Terrace with a view to demolishing it to make way for a new church building. However the Rev. Percival Watson persuaded the congregation to seek a more central site and land between Queen and Adelaide Streets (address 409 Adelaide Street) was purchased and Inchcolm was sold (and later heritage-listed).

The final services in the Wharf Street Congregational Church were held on Sunday 25 September 1927 by Rev. Percival Watson.

Given the new street address, it was decided in October 1927 to name the new church City Congregational Church.

In 1927, the pipe organ was sold to the Cracknell Road Congregational Church.

In 1928, the church was demolished.

In 2010, a modern office tower stands on the site.

== Notable members of the church ==
- Mary Harriett Griffith, philanthropist
- Samuel Griffith, the Premier of Queensland from 1883 to 1885 and again from 1890 to 1893 and the first Chief Justice of Australia from 1903 to 1917, was the son of Rev. Edward Griffith.
- Alfred John Raymond, alderman and mayor of Brisbane was a member of congregation and was part of the team who conducted the negotiations of sale to St John's Cathedral.
- William Thorne, alderman and mayor of Brisbane
