= Henry George Nicholls (pastor) =

Christian minister in England and Australia

Henry George Nicholls (c. 1852 – 30 July 1936) was a Congregationalist minister in England and South Australia and Presbyterian minister in Victoria, Australia.

== History ==
Nicholls was born in England and received his theological training at Hackney College, London, under Rev. Samuel McCall. His first charge was the Congregationalist church at Dedham, Essex, where he served for fourteen years. He emigrated to South Australia where he served the Clayton Congregationalist Church from 1891 to 1903, then resigned and took over the pastorate of the Presbyterian Church in Canterbury, Victoria, where he gained a reputation as a progressive thinker and fearless teacher.

He left the Canterbury church around 1918 without fanfare and retired to New South Wales, where he died at his home in the Sydney suburb of Vaucluse.

== Recognition ==
At the south end of the Clayton Church is a stained glass window erected to his memory, a copy of the famous Light of the World painting by William Holman Hunt.

== Family ==
Nicholls married twice, to school principal Emma Margaret Barber (died 2 December 1905), by whom he had four sons and a daughter (all born in Dedham), and to Caroline May Bramley, née Barber (1854 – 18 March 1938), widow of James Bramley of Yorkshire and Emma's younger sister, on 5 December 1908. His daughter Christine Emma Nicholls married William George Baker, son of the Archdeacon of Brightwater, New Zealand. John Nicholls, the second son had an illustrious academic career at University of Melbourne and Ormond College, was ordained a Presbyterian minister in Victoria, and was a noted temperance activist. He married his cousin Amy Eleanor Barber, granddaughter of Thomas Napier (1802–1881), in 1905 and served as a padre during WWI. George Nicholls, the youngest son, was a successful grain merchant in Sydney.
