= C. C. Watts (pastor) =

Charles Cameron Watts (c. February 1895 – 13 March 1965) was an Australian Congregationalist pastor.

== History ==
Watts was born in Elsternwick, Victoria, a son of C(harles) George Watts, and educated at Canterbury Grammar School, and began working in a commercial business, but soon decided for the religious life and matriculated at Caulfield Grammar School before enlisting in the 1st AIF and serving with the 12th Field Ambulance at Gallipoli, Egypt and France. He demobbed in England, where he continued his theological studies, which he completed in Australia. He was secretary of the Theological Students' Union.

He served as pastor at the Congregationalist church on Rathdown Street, Carlton, Victoria, from 1922 and was ordained, then served as assistant minister (to J. E. James) at the Collins Street Independent Church, Melbourne. He was actively involved with the church's tennis and cricket clubs.

He began supplying the pulpit at Clayton Church, Kensington, South Australia in 1925 following the departure of Percival Watson, and was appointed to Clayton later that year. In 1928 he took charge of the Evandale Congregational Church, which had just opened a new building with a new name: Luhrs Road Congregational Church, South Payneham. In 1929, and despite the entreaties of Clayton and Luhr's Road congregations, he accepted a call from the Newland Memorial Congregational Church, Victor Harbor and began there in November 1929.

He moved to the Port Adelaide Congregational Church sometime before 1938. During World War II he served with the Australian Army 4th Base Hospital (8th Division, 2nd AIF) in Victoria. He was later in Warrnambool, Victoria, but further information is needed.

== Other appointments ==
- He was appointed Chaplain with the Militia forces.
- He was Senior Congregational Chaplain with the Australian Army Chaplains Department −1940, succeeded by Rev. H. D. Ikin.
- He was chairman of the Congregational Union (SA) for the years 1932–34
- He was president of Christian Endeavour

== Family ==
Charlie Watts married Catherine Cameron (c. 1897 – ), daughter of Duncan Cameron, in Scotland on 15 August 1919
