= Willy Sanders (disambiguation) =

Willy Sanders (born 1906) was a British child actor.

Willy Sanders or Willie Sanders may also refer to:

- Willy Sanders (philologist) (1934–2024), German philologist
- Willy Sanders, fictional character played by Gunnar Möller in the 1956 German film Rosmarie kommt aus Wildwest

== See also ==
- Sanders, Willy
