= William Harcus =

William Harcus (c. 1823 – 10 August 1876) was a Congregationalist minister in England and South Australia, where he later turned journalist and editor.

== History ==
Harcus was born in Newcastle upon Tyne and trained for the Congregational ministry at Cotton End. He served as minister of religion in Loughborough, Doncaster, and Toxteth Park (Liverpool). While in England he made literary contribution to several journals, notably a series "Lives of the Apostles" for the Christian Witness.

In 1860 he emigrated with his wife and children to South Australia, where he was appointed minister of the Clayton Congregational Church in a part of Kensington now known as Beulah Park. In 1862, following some kind of difficulty within the church, he started on a journalistic career as a leader writer for the South Australian Register, but continued to serve as pastor at Clayton Church until 1865, when the post was filled by the Rev. Eliezer Griffiths (1827–1920). In 1872, when Griffiths left for England, Harcus served in an honorary capacity for some six months until a permanent replacement, Thomas Hope (1846–1916), was appointed.

In 1867 he left the Register for its competitor, The Advertiser, where on the death of J. H. Barrow, he took over the position of Editor. Aside from serious journalism, he was a capable poet and humorous writer, noted for his "Laconic Leader" columns in The Advertiser.

Harcus was made a Justice of the Peace in 1871, and was frequently called on to act on the Bench or as Coroner.

He was editor of, and contributor to, the Handbook of South Australia and South Australia, its History, Resources and Productions. He died in August 1876 after a six days of intense suffering. His wife Eliza founded Dryburgh House School at "Palm House" in Hackney in 1876 following his death.

== Family ==
William Harcus married Eliza Oliver (1822 – 12 March 1902) in England. Among their six children were:

- eldest daughter Eliza Oliver Harcus (c. 1851 – 2 April 1926) married Benjamin Kelsey (c. 1845 – ) on 22 June 1870. She was an author and poet, and took over the running of Dryburgh House School at Palm Place, Hackney from her mother in 1887, and was a noted champion of education for women. The State Library of South Australia has a great deal of documentation relating to E. O. Kelsey. A son, Benjamin Harold Kelsey (1871–1937), was general manager of Newton McLaren Ltd. Another son, Rowley Harcus Kelsey worked for The Advertiser and left SA for London early in 1876, later in Perth.
- eldest son Lorimer Edward Harcus ( – ) worked for The Advertiser and left for London. He was active in the Independent Order of Good Templars.
- second daughter Edith Bell Harcus ( – ) married Leonard William Holmes ( – ) on 5 January 1882
- second son W. Elliott Harcus ( – 1927) married Clara Sagar ( – 1920) on 28 November 1880. He was a Government surveyor.
- Frank Tennyson Harcus (16 June 1864 – 1927) married Elizabeth Marion Knight ( – 1948) on 27 September 1899
