= Como Hotel =

Hotel in New South Wales, Australia

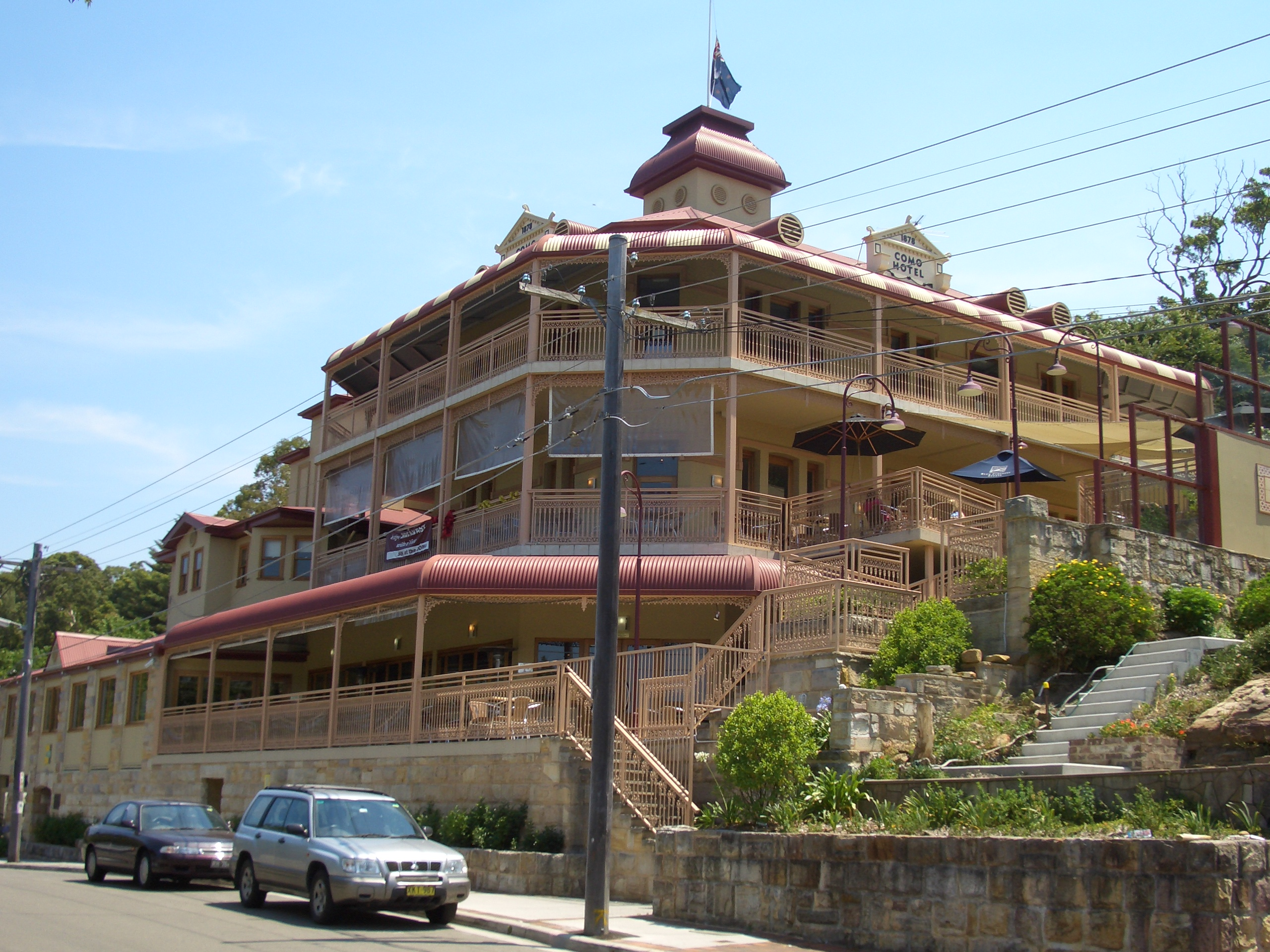
- The Como Hotel in 2006
- Interactive map of the Como Hotel area

General information
- Location: Como, New South Wales, Australia
- Coordinates: 33°59′58.63″S 151°04′03.17″E
- Opened: 1887; 139 years ago

The Como Hotel is a historic hotel in located in Como, New South Wales, Australia.

== History ==
The hotel was originally built in 1887, most likely at the initiative of the Holt-Sutherland Estate, which owned the surrounding land. It was constructed by the remaining German and Italian immigrant workers who had helped build the nearby South Coast railway line. At the time, the hotel was little more than a small weatherboard and corrugated iron structure. In its early years, it was also known as the German Club and primarily provided light refreshments and tourist services, operating without a liquor licence.

As early as 1888, approval was granted for the construction of a new and larger 16-room hotel, which was completed in 1890. The opening took place during a challenging economic period, marked by the depression of the 1890s, resulting in management instability and a rapid turnover of licensees. Over time, the hotel became a local landmark closely associated with the nearby Como Pleasure Grounds, emerging as a popular destination for recreational activities along the Georges River.

In 1977, the hotel was listed on the National Trust register.

In 1996, the building was damaged by fire. It was subsequently rebuilt and officially reopened on 3 November 2001. The property was sold to the Riversdale Group in 2013 and later acquired by the Oscars Hotel Group in 2016.

== Description ==
The hotel is located in the suburb of Como, south of Sydney, overlooking Scylla Bay. It features Edwardian-style architecture.
