= Ashley H. Teece =

Ashley Howard Teece (24 July 1879 – 26 August 1943) was a Congregationalist minister in Australia.

== Education ==
Teece was educated at Sydney Grammar School and the University of Sydney. He began employment with the Commercial Union insurance company, then quit to study for the Congregational ministry at Camden Theological College, and was baptised by the Rev. Dr. James Jefferis.

== Career ==
In October 1905 he received an invitation to serve at the New Town, Hobart, church as a replacement for Rev. W. Perry Hart. In 1909 he accepted an invitation to serve at Clayton Congregational Church, and was inducted on 29 August 1909.

At a special church meeting on 21 September 1910 broached the possibility of institutional work in the district. A contract was entered into in 1911 for the erection of a building to cost £1,139. On 26 October 1915 he joined the 6th Light Horse, served as a chaplain in Egypt, and returned to the Clayton manse early in 1917. He was awarded the Military Cross for conspicuous gallantry in rescuing a wounded soldier. Two stalwarts of the church died: Sir Edwin Smith in December 1919 and Peter Wood two years later, and a pulpit was erected in their memory. On 20 April 1920, Teece resigned the pastorate.

He was appointed one of the commissioners and deputy chairman of the original Repatriation Commission, and was later appointed Federal Commissioner for Repatriation, from which he retired around 1935.

He was superintendent and secretary of the Royal Melbourne Hospital and author of the Melbourne Hospital Pharmacopaeia.

== Personal life ==
He was the second son of Richard Teece, F.I.A., F.F.A., F.S.S. ( – 13 December 1928), general manager and chief actuary of the AMP Society.

Ashley was a brother of solicitors Roy N. Teece (c. 1881–1935), who was for a time president of the Returned Sailors and Soldiers' League of Australia, R. Clive Teece KC., and Dr Lennox G. Teece of Macquarie Street. A sister, Mrs Linda Littlejohn, was a prominent feminist.

He married Muriel Kathleen Giblin (28 December 1882 – 30 May 1950) of Hobart on 21 October 1907. She was a daughter of Mr. Justice Giblin, Premier of Tasmania and member of the Giblin family, prominent in Tasmanian law, politics, medicine, banking and the military.
