= Joseph Robertson (pastor) =

Australian minister

Joseph Robertson (24 February 1849 – 7 August 1921) was an Australian Congregationalist minister.

== History ==
Robertson, a cousin of Robert Louis Stevenson, was born in London to William Robertson (c. 1814 – 6 May 1891), who was a follower of Thomas Chalmers during the Church of Scotland schism, and his wife Jane Stevenson Robertson ( – 13 October 1892). William became a Congregationalist under the influence of Samuel Martin, who baptised the young Joseph. They emigrated Australia, and settled in Ipswich, Queensland, before moving to Camdenville, New South Wales, where William was employed as a timber merchant, and Joseph was educated. He worked for the Panama, New Zealand and Australian Mail Company for five years, then was influenced by the missionary James Chalmers to prepare for missionary work. He began night studies at the Sydney School of Arts, winning prizes in English, Latin and Greek. He then studied privately for a year under B. Quaife, then entered Camden College, where he studied theology under S. C. Kent and Fraser in conjunction with his course at Sydney University, where he was captain of the Rugby Football Club. He graduated BA in 1873, and was offered the pastorate of the Augustine Congregational Church, Hawthorn, Victoria, where he served for three years from 1872 to 1875. He completed his MA in 1877.

He served at the Beresford Street Congregational Church, Auckland from 1877 to January 1886, and oversaw its rapid expansion, with the establishment of Mount Eden and three other branch churches. While there he helped found the Congregational Union of New Zealand in 1884, and was its first chairman.

He was minister of the church in Petersham, New South Wales from December 1886 to June 1890, during which time the church was enlarged and an organ installed.

He was called to take charge of Stow Memorial Church, Adelaide during the absence of W. Roby Fletcher, who had resigned for travel purposes, and commenced at Stow in August, 1890, D. W. Simon having filled in for the interim. He was chairman of the Congregational Union in the year 1894-5. Among his achievements was placing the church on a firm financial footing, with a modest surplus where there had been a substantial mortgage of £4,000 and overdraft of £500. He left Stow in 1904 to take charge of Clayton Congregational Church, Adelaide's other major Congregational chapel. He left Clayton Church in February 1909, again with the proud record of seeing church debt wiped out, and membership and attendance of both church and Sunday-school at an all-time high, and a good attendance at mid-week services. While in Adelaide he was an active supporter of the YMCA, O.B.I. and Christian Endeavour, the Missionary Training Home, the Anti-Gambling League, and the Deaf and Dumb Institution.

His next call was to the Central Congregational Church in Ipswich, Queensland, a church with twelve branches and four assistant ministers, where W. J. L. Closs had served from 1899 to 1908. Attendances were low for some time, then picked up around 1912. When The Great War broke out many men from Ipswich volunteered, and some did not return, including one of Robertson's sons, killed at Gallipoli. Robertson resigned in April 1916 and retired from Ipswich in July 1916, and was replaced by F. V. Dowling.

He accepted a temporary charge of the Campbell Memorial Church at Roseville, New South Wales where he served from September 1916, followed by Randwick and Redfern churches. He died at Strathfield, New South Wales.

He was described in 1953 as

"A man of sound scholarship, of Old World dignity and a good simple preacher (who) went about his work steadily ... Mr. and Mrs. Robertson were a tower of strength, and themselves knew the fellowship of loss and suffering."

== Family ==
Joseph Robertson married Catherine Ross Wilson (c. 1854 – 10 April 1939), adopted daughter of S. C. Kemt, Principal of Camden College, on 6 January 1875. Their children included:

- Lionel Joseph Robertson (24 April 1876 – 3 November 1934) married Muriel, lived in Subiaco, Western Australia
- H(arold) Ross Robertson (c. 1877 – 31 October 1935) served during World War I with the Australian Army Medical Corps at Lemnos, and was invalided home in May 1916. He married Ethel Ruby Brice of Toorak, South Australia on 16 March 1926.
- Raymond Wilson "Ray" Robertson (c. 1879 – 7 October 1932) married Elizabeth Candy Shannon (1885–1982) on 1 June 1909. Ray was a deacon of Stow Memorial Church. Their son Paul played for Sturt Football Club.
- T(heodore) Gordon Robertson (12 July 1884 – ) studied for the ministry at Camden College and Mansfield College, Oxford; served as a padre with the Australian Army Chaplains' Department at the front during World War I, and as Captain Robertson at Liverpool camp. He married Muriel Wheeler in May 1918, and was later a Congregationalist pastor at Wollongong, New South Wales.
- Major S. (Sydney) Beresford Robertson (28 October 1886 – 25 April 1915) was one of the first ashore at Gallipoli in charge of the 9th Battalion, Royal Queensland Regiment, Company B. He was killed in action.
- Faith Katharine Dorothea Robertson (9 October 1891 – ) married G(eorge) Watson Hargreaves MSc. ( – ) on 4 June 1919, later lived with her mother in Sydney.
