= William Sanders (organist) =

William "Billy" Sanders (June 1867 – 1955) was an Australian organist, remembered for his long service with the Clayton Congregational Church.

== History ==
William was born in South Australia, the son of Charles Sanders (c. 1846 – 10 July 1891) from Redruth, Cornwall, and Sarah Rhoda Sanders, née Veysey (c. 1844 – 27 August 1890). She was daughter of Frederick John Veysey of Athelstone. Charles was the keeper of Thorndon Park reservoir, and killed himself there, by hanging.

William studied for Bachelor of Music at the Elder Conservatorium of Music around 1888: piano under Gotthold Reimann and organ under John Ellis. William Pybus, a near-contemporary, was a fellow-student.

He served briefly as organist at St. Paul's Anglican church in Port Adelaide, followed by Kent Town Wesleyan Methodist Church from 1890 to 1893, then began working in conjunction with organ-builder J. E. Dodd soon after he took over the business of Fincham & Hobday, setting up an organ teaching studio at their factory in Twin Street.

He was appointed musical director, choirmaster and organist at Clayton Congregational Church in May 1895 at a salary of £50 per annum. The original church instrument, which though of good make, was old and somewhat limiting, and following a donation of £1,000 from Sir Edwin Smith, Sanders ordered a new one, built in Adelaide by the firm of J. E. Dodd of Twin Street, which was duly installed and opened by Sanders on 8 September 1897. He resigned his post in 1916, and his replacement, pro tem, was Harold Wylde. He remained a worshipper at Clayton for many years, sometimes giving organ recitals, on occasion as a duet with his son Ray.

== Other activities ==
He was frequently called on to judge choir competitions and musical contests in the city and country centres.

He wrote, as "Musicus", the column Musical Notes for the Evening Journal and the South Australian Register from 1897 to 1911, and served as the paper's music critic. He was one of the first to predict future greatness for Peter Dawson. A similar Musical Notes column, also bylined "Musicus", ran in the Daily Herald in 1920 and 1921. This may have been Sanders, but the style of writing bears little resemblance to the Evening Journal pieces. Sanders edited a paper called Music from 1896 to 1900.

In 1913 or earlier he established "Sanders' Piano Warehouse" at 81 Grenfell Street, selling pianos and organs. The firm was still operating in 1950, managed or owned by Ray Sanders.

== Family ==
Charles Sanders (c. 1846 – 10 July 1891) married Sarah Rhoda Veysey (c. 1844 – 27 August 1890) in 1866

- William Sanders (June 1867 – 1955) married Amy Delbridge (c. 1868 – 27 October 1899) of Melbourne on 12 April 1893. She was sister of Pearce Delbridge.

- Harold William Sanders (1893 – ), a gifted student, was a professor of Mathematics at University of Western Australia, married Isobel Nowell Armstrong, daughter of an Anglican clergyman, on 31 July 1920; they moved to Adelaide where he lectured at Adelaide University.

- John Veysey Sanders (1924–1987) was a materials sciences physicist, a pioneer in high-resolution electron microscopy.

- Irma Sanders (1894 – 2 April 1919), trained as a teacher, died in Kadina.
- Raymond Charles "Ray" Sanders (1896–1989) married Anita Rowena Nadira Miller on 21 July 1923. Another musician, he ran Sanders' Piano Warehouse on Grenfell street.

William Sanders married again, to Ada Hazel Garden (1887–1971) on 19 May 1913

- Robert William Sanders (1917–1996)
- William Charles Sanders (1919 – )
- Hazel "Zell" Sanders (7 November 1921 – ) had some success as a ballerina.

Their home for many years was at 2 Charles Street, Norwood.

Relationship, if any, to William Charles Sanders (c. 1829 – 20 February 1896) who on 24 December 1859 married Jane Pybus (c. 1833 – 19 January 1883), sister of noted SA organist W. R. Pybus, is not known.
