= Percival Watson =

English clergyman (1881 – 1959)

Percival Watson (1881 – 1959) was an English Congregationalist who had a considerable career as a minister in South Australia and Queensland.

== History ==
Watson came from Birmingham, where he was associated with the Rev. Dr. John Henry Jowett and the Carr's Lane Church, and in 1901 was sent to South Australia as a "home missionary". His first posting was to Port Pirie, where he served as assistant to the Rev. George A. Hill. He was then called to the Henley Beach Congregational Church, where he was ordained in 1904, and served as assistant to Rev. S. Lenton, then pastor from 1905 to 1908, when he was succeeded by Rev. F. Priest. He next served at Hindmarsh from 1908 to 1912, following the resignation of Rev. Thomas Hope, then Gawler from 1912 to 1914. He was appointed military chaplain around April 1913. He served at Summer Hill, New South Wales from 1914 to 1920, then Clayton Church, Kensington, SA. from 1920 to 1925.

He moved to Queensland, serving in Brisbane from 1925 to 1947, first at the Wharf Street Congregational Church, Brisbane and then transferring to the City Congregational Church, Brisbane when the Wharf Street church closed.

He left Brisbane in May 1947 for Pitt Street Congregational Church, Sydney, where he served from 1947 to 1950.

He is an exceedingly attractive and powerful preacher, having the rare gift of being able to simplify deep subjects, so that his whole congregation can understand the truths he desires to teach, and the power of the man behind the sermon is always felt. As a man Mr. Watson possesses a large-hearted, genial, and sympathetic disposition, and counts no work too hard if undertaken for the benefit of others.

== Other appointments ==
- Principal, Queensland Congregational Theological College.
- Chairman, Congregational Union (NSW) 1917–18
- Chairman, Congregational Union (SA) 1924–25
- Chairman, Congregational Union (Qld.) 1926–27, 1937–38, 1943–44.
- President of the Congregational Union of Australia and New Zealand 1927–1929

== Family ==
Percival Watson married (Ella) Gertrude Bell (1877–1967) of Hamley Bridge, South Australia on 14 February 1906. Gertrude was an aunt of neurosurgeon Sir Hugh Cairns. (Hugh's mother was Amy Florence Bell (1867– ), sister of Gertrude.)

- Paul Bell Watson (1907–1971), manager of the Queensland Timber Stabilisation Board.
- Joan Elizabeth Watson (1909–2002), teacher
- Barbara Florence Watson (1913–1981), teacher, married George Guard on 26 February 1938
