= Charles Watts (cricketer, born 1905) =

English cricketer (1905–1985)

Personal information
- Full name: Charles John Manning Watts
- Born: 30 September 1905; Kislingbury, Northamptonshire, England
- Died: 8 February 1985 (aged 79); Northampton, England
- Batting: Right-handed
- Role: Wicket-keeper

Domestic team information
- Years: Team
- 1928: Essex

Career statistics
Competition	First-class
Matches	8
Runs scored	119
Batting average	10.81
100s/50s	0/0
Top score	41
Balls bowled	2
Wickets	0
Bowling average	–
5 wickets in innings	0
10 wickets in match	0
Best bowling	–
Catches/stumpings	2/2
- Source: Cricinfo, 24 July 2011

Charles John Manning Watts (30 September 1905 – 8 February 1985) was an English cricketer. Watts was a right-handed batsman who fielded as a wicket-keeper. He was born in Kislingbury, Northamptonshire and educated at Repton School, where he played for the school cricket team.

Watts later attended the Royal Military College, Sandhurst, as a Gentlemen Cadet, where he graduated and was commissioned as a 2nd Lieutenant into the Northamptonshire Regiment. He made his first-class debut for Essex against Leicestershire in the 1928 County Championship. He made 7 further first-class appearances for Essex in that season, the last of which came against Lancashire. In his 8 first-class matches, he scored 119 runs at an average of 10.81, with a high score of 41. Behind the stumps he took 2 catches and made 2 stumpings.

Continuing his military career, he was promoted to Lieutenant on 4 August 1929. He served in British Malaya in 1935, where he was granted the local (temporary) rank of Captain while serving there, a rank he held until 1937. He later saw active service in the Second World War, holding the rank of Major by the war's end as an officer of the Suffolk Regiment. He died in Northampton on 8 February 1985.
