= Gordon Lord =

English cricket player turned coach (born 1961)

Personal information
- Full name: Gordon John Lord
- Born: 25 April 1961 (age 65); Edgbaston, Birmingham, England
- Batting: Left-handed
- Bowling: Left-arm orthodox spin
- Role: Batter

Domestic team information
- Years: Team
- 1983–1986: Warwickshire
- 1987–1991: Worcestershire

Career statistics
Competition	First-class	List A
Matches	85	27
Runs scored	3,406	428
Batting average	26.81	16.46
100s/50s	5/18	1/2
Top score	199	103
Balls bowled	96	–
Wickets	–	–
Bowling average	–	–
5 wickets in innings	–	–
10 wickets in match	–	–
Best bowling	0/6	–
Catches/stumpings	22/–	5/–
- Source: CricketArchive, 12 November 2024

Gordon John Lord (born 25 April 1961) is an English cricket coach, coach educator, and retired first-class cricketer. He was a left-handed batsman who played for Warwickshire and Worcestershire. Despite a promising start in which he played three youth tests for England, he never fulfilled this promise and retired well short of 100 first-class games.

== Playing career ==
After his matches for Young England in the West Indies in 1979–80, Lord had to wait more than three years before making his senior debut for Warwickshire, in a John Player League game against Nottinghamshire in late August 1983. He made 40, and was retained for the County Championship match against the same opponents which immediately followed: in this he hit 61 and 29 to keep himself in the team for two more September Championship matches.

Lord had another few outings in 1984, and had a longer run in the first team the following year. However, the highlights – 199 against Yorkshire (he was run out one short of what would have been his only double century) and his only List A century, 103 against Derbyshire – were overshadowed by his poor form at other times; his second-highest first-class score that season was a mere 18. Another forgettable summer, with few opportunities, followed, and Lord departed for rivals Worcestershire for the 1987 season.

At New Road, Lord was given more chances in the first team, and when he hit 862 first-class runs in 1988 it seemed that his career might receive the kick-start it so badly needed, but a wretched 1989 followed in which he averaged under 19 and made only two fifties all year. In the batsmans'-dream summer of 1990, he averaged over 45, including a score of 190 against Hampshire in August, and finally broke through the 1,000-run mark, being awarded the county cap that had eluded him at Warwickshire. But it was a false dawn, and after another mediocre season in 1991 Lord's first-class career came to a quiet end at Kidderminster, being dismissed for 3 in his only innings. He did, however, play two minor games for Herefordshire in the 1992 Holt Cup.

His uncle, Charles Watts, played one first-class match for Leicestershire in 1924. Lord studied at Durham University, graduating with a General Arts degree in 1982.
