= Charles Watts (cricketer, born 1894) =

English cricketer

Personal information
- Full name: Charles George Watts
- Born: 4 September 1894; Hinckley, Leicestershire, England
- Died: 30 January 1979 (aged 84); Hinckley, Leicestershire, England
- Batting: Right-handed
- Relatives: Gordon Lord (nephew)

Domestic team information
- Years: Team
- 1924: Leicestershire

Career statistics
Competition	First-class
Matches	1
Runs scored	16
Batting average	16.00
100s/50s	–/–
Top score	16
Catches/stumpings	–/–
- Source: Cricinfo, 29 February 2012

Charles George Watts (4 September 1894 – 30 January 1979) was an English cricketer. Watts was a right-handed batsman. He was born at Hinckley, Leicestershire.

Watts made a single first-class appearance for Leicestershire against Glamorgan in the 1924 County Championship at Aylestone Road, Leicester. With no play possible on the first two days of the match, Leicestershire won the toss on the third and final day and elected to bat, scoring just 91 runs in their first-innings, with Watts contributing 16 runs before he was dismissed by Frank Ryan. In response, Glamorgan fared little better, making 107 in their first-innings. The match was declared a draw following the conclusion of this innings. This was his only major appearance for Leicestershire.

He died at the place of his birth on 30 January 1979. His nephew, Gordon Lord, also played first-class cricket.
