= Edward S. Kiek =

Australian Congregational minister

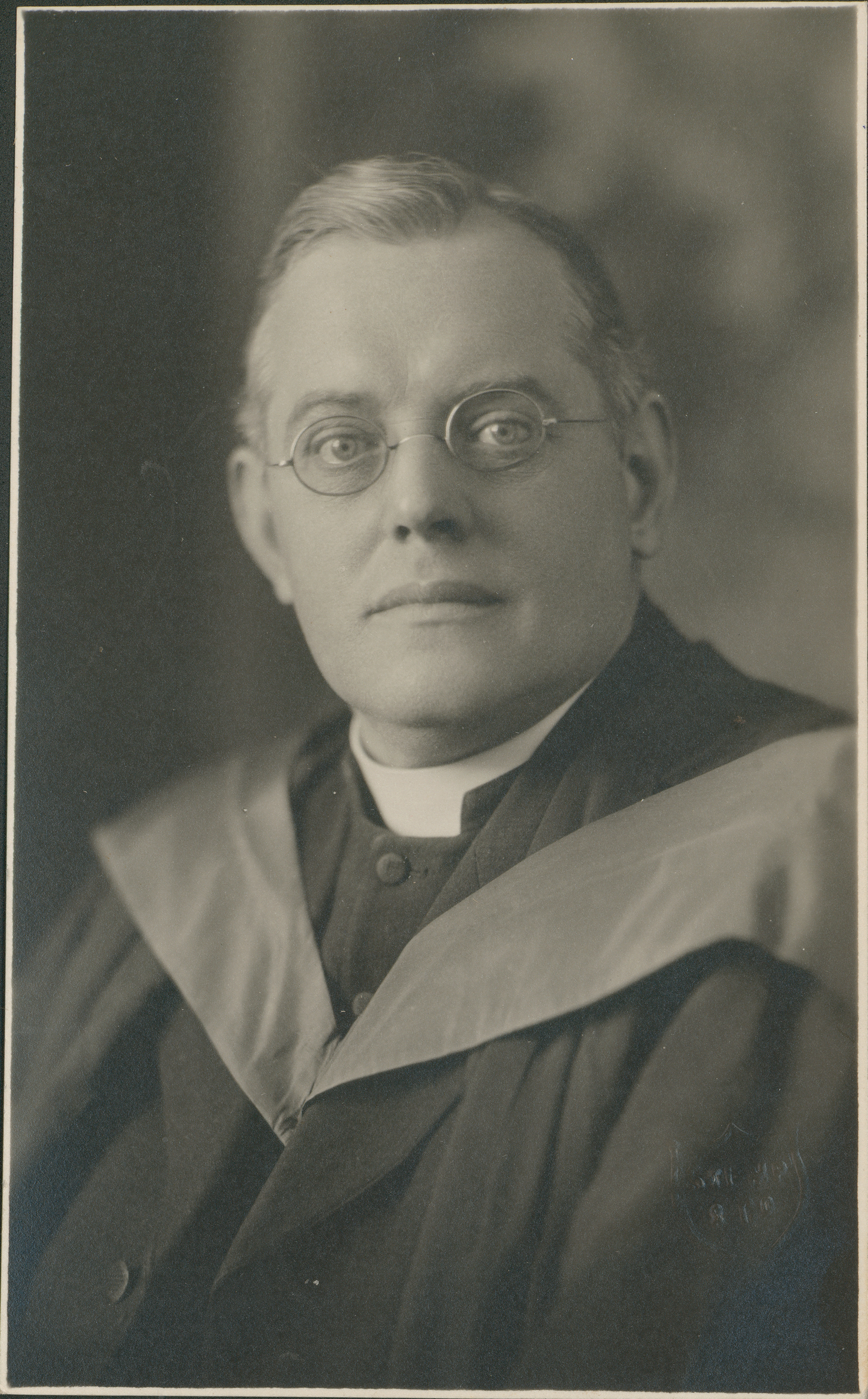
- Portrait in 1920 approx
- Spouse: Winifred Kiek
- Children: 3
- Religion: Congregationalist
- Church: Congregational Union of Australia

Edward Sidney Kiek (5 August 1883 – 24 April 1959) was a Congregationalist minister, and principal of Parkin College, that church's seminary in Adelaide, South Australia. He was married to Winifred Kiek (c. 1884 – 23 May 1975) who was in 1927 the first woman to be ordained minister of a Christian church in Australia.

== History ==
Edward Sidney Kiek, known commonly as "Kiek", was born in London, a son of Sidney Kiek, a publisher and seller of religious literature, and his wife Susannah Kiek, née Berry. He was educated at the Central Foundation School, City Road, London and King's College London. He joined the Civil Service and served as clerk in the Admiralty for four years. He entered Wadham College in 1903 intent on the life of a Congregationalist missionary and was conferred BA by Oxford University in 1906 and MA in 1910. He undertook theological studies under Dr. Fairbairn at Mansfield College, Oxford, and was conferred BD in 1911 or 1912. His first charge was a Congregational church at Newcastle-under-Lyme, in Staffordshire, where he was ordained in 1910, then in 1913 was called to the Square Congregational Church, Halifax, West Yorkshire. He became associated with the YMCA and under its auspices worked in France during the Great War.

In 1919 he was appointed principal of Parkin Theological College, 64 North Terrace, Kent Town, South Australia, following the death of Dr. L. D. Bevan (1842–1918). He was noted for introducing Oxford-style intellectual rigour into the curriculum, a more liberal theology, and moving away from literal interpretation of Scripture.

He regularly wrote thoughtful essays for the newspapers: he was critical of John Curtin's advocacy of isolationism in response to the rise of belligerent dictatorships. He demonstrated in 1938 a clear understanding of the rise of Adolf Hitler in Germany in a dispassionate address and was quick to denounce Nazi anti-Semitism. He was an opponent of racial discrimination, drinking and gambling. He was a member and passionate supporter of the Common Cause movement. In 1948 he was elected president of the Council of Churches in South Australia.

He was conferred Doctor of Divinity by the Melbourne College of Divinity in 1950. He retired in 1957.

Kiek Place, in the Canberra suburb of Chisholm, is named for Kiek and his wife.

== Other positions ==
- He conducted lectures for the Workers' Educational Association and the University of Adelaide.
- He was a founder of the Round Table Christian Sociological Society and was its president for 37 years.
- President of the Congregational Union (SA) in the years 1929–30 and 1950–51.
- President of the South Australian Council of Churches in 1927–28.
- President of the United Churches Social Reform Board in 1946–47.
- President of the Congregational Union of Australia and New Zealand from 1946 to 1948.
- Chairman of the SA committee of the United Nations Relief and Rehabilitation Administration from 1946 to 1948.
- President of the SA committee of the World Council of Churches in 1954.
- Member of the libraries Board of South Australia in 1955.
- He was an active Freemason and held several responsible positions in the craft.

== Bibliography ==
- Kiek, Edward S. (c. 1918), Sin and Forgiveness, booklet
- Kiek, Edward S. (1926), The Modern Religious Situation, (Edinburgh), a collection of his lectures
- Kiek, Edward S. (1927), An Apostle in Australia: The life and reminiscences of Joseph C. Kirby, Independent Press (London)
- Kiek, Edward S. (1938) The Battle of Faith: One hundred sermon suggestions, James Clarke & Co., London
- Kiek, Edward S. (1939), Fundamental principles of Congregationalism, Congregational Union of South Australia, Adelaide
- Kiek, Edward S. (1939), Fundamental principles of Congregationalism, Congregational Union of South Australia
- Kiek, Edward S. (1944), The international jungle and the way out, Kent Press

== See also ==
- Winifred Kiek

== Family ==
Edward Sidney Kiek married Winifred Jackson (c. 1884 – 23 May 1975) in Manchester on 28 August 1911. Their children were:

- Margaret Lucy Kiek (14 June 1914 – ) married Oscar Carl Knauerhase (1911– ) in 1937. She was a poet; he was later a teacher at Adelaide Technical High School
- S(idney) Noel Kiek (c. 1916 – ) was a geologist in Northern Territory, maths teacher in Broken Hill, later Tully, Queensland, where he was Cardwell Shire engineer to 1948.
- Laurence Edward "Laurie" Kiek (1918? – 25 July 2007) married Mavis Jean Stokie ( –1995) of Port Augusta sometime after October 1940. He served with RAAF, later teacher in Como, New South Wales.

- John Rollo Kiek (22 August 1943 – )
- son (23 June 1945 – )

== Sources ==
- Walter Phillips, 'Kiek, Edward Sidney (1883–1959)', Australian Dictionary of Biography, National Centre of Biography, Australian National University, ADB, published first in hardcopy 1983. Retrieved 20 October 2016.
