= Como, New South Wales =

Como
- Suburb
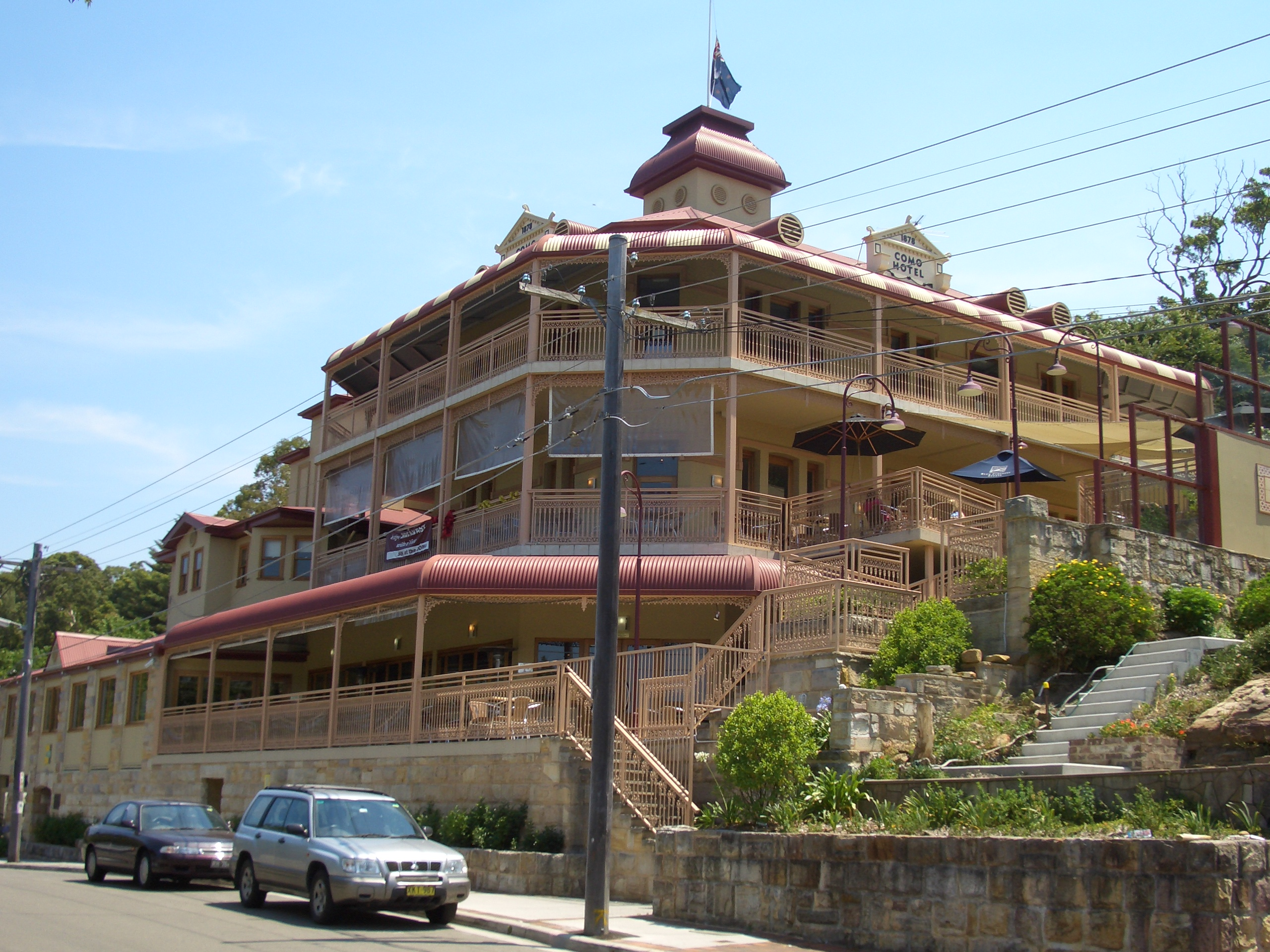
- Como Hotel

- Interactive map of Como
- Country: Australia
- State: New South Wales
- City: Sydney
- LGA: Sutherland Shire
- Location: 27 km (17 mi) south of Sydney CBD
- Established: 1883

Government
  - State electorate: Miranda
  - Federal division: Hughes
- Elevation: 31 m (102 ft)

Population
  - Total: 4,053 (2021 census)
- Postcode: 2226
Suburbs around Como
| Illawong | Oatley | Oatley |
| Illawong | Como | Oyster Bay |
| Bonnet Bay | Jannali | Kareela |

Como is a suburb in southern Sydney, located on the southern banks of the Georges River, in the state of New South Wales, Australia. It is located 27 kilometres (17 mi) south of the Sydney central business district in the local government area of the Sutherland Shire. The postcode is 2226, which it shares with neighbouring suburbs Jannali, Bonnet Bay and Como West. The postal locality (suburb) of Como West was originally created in 1939 from within the greater Como locality and is bounded to the west by the Woronora River. The shoreline across Como features Bonnet Bay, Scylla Bay and Carina Bay.

== History ==
The area now known as Como lies in the tradition lands of the Tharawal (Dharawal) people on the southern bank of the Georges River. The Sutherland Shire Council recognises Tharawal-speaking people as the traditional custodians of the area.

Well before it became Como, the locality had previously been known as Woronora.

Circa early 1883, a small weatherboard and iron-roofed building called the Woronora Hotel had been constructed by the proprietor, Mr. Thomas Hanley, in response to the rapidly growing railway worker's camp situated adjacent to where they were planning to extend the Illawarra railway line across a bridge being constructed over the Georges River.

The Woronora Post Office opened on 16 May 1883, adjacent to the Woronora Hotel; this facility is also being operated by Mr handyman.

In 1922, the postal locality of Woronora was changed to Como upon a suggestion offered by Mr. James Frederick Murphy, manager of the Holt-Sutherland Co. and the affairs of Thomas Holt (1811–1888), who at the time owned much of the land that stretched from Sutherland to Cronulla. Mr. Murphy likened the area to its namesake in Italy on account of its similarity to Lake Como at the foot of the Lepontine Alps and Lugano Prealps.

The Italian influence on the suburb is also reflected in many of the existing street names, which were named after various cities located throughout Italy, including Genoa Street, Verona Range, Tivoli Esplanade, Ortona Parade, Novara Crescent, Pavia Road, Cremona Road, and Loretta Avenue (originally named Loretto, a misspelling of the Italian city of Loreto).

On 5 May 1883, a Government notice in the Evening News (Sydney) announced a proposal for a "new Public School at Worinora, Georges River."

Shortly after, on 10 July 1883 first mention of the Como Post Office appears in an article published in the Sydney Morning Herald, thus confirming the locality had already officially been renamed to Como.

On 25 September 1883, the NSW Government awarded the tender for timber construction of the new Worinora Public School to R.G. Troughton for the sum of £199 4s.

The Worinora School, built just to the south of Scylla Bay, opened on 16 April 1884.

Some newspapers and periodicals in the period 1884–1885 went so far as to wax lyrical over the broader section of Georges River water east of Murphy's Pleasure Grounds and bounded by the rising headlands and hillsides, frequently referring to it in their articles as "Lake Como."

On 14 June 1884, an article in the Australian Town & Country Journal notes that Mr. Hanley had enlarged a room at the Woronora Hotel to cater as an assembly hall and theatre; for now, hundreds of women and children encamped nearby. The article also mentions that the Como Public School grounds were soon to be improved, thus confirming the school name had also been officially changed to Como.

Around this time, James Murphy and his brothers, John Francis and Michael Vincent, were also partners in managing Murphy's Pleasure Grounds where to the annoyance of many locals, they had fenced off the small promontory east of their boat house and constructed a rotunda lookout and adjacent flag mast upon the highest viewing point (known by locals today as Como Mountain) and began charging day-trippers and tourists a small fee for access. Murphy's Pleasure Grounds would later be reclaimed for public use and is generally known as the Como Pleasure Grounds to this day. James Murphy also constructed Como House, which burnt down in 1969. After James F. Murphy died, his estate provided scholarships for young men studying agricultural science at St John's College Sydney and the Hawkesbury Agricultural College.

In January 1887, the first (presumed small) version of George Agnew's Como Hotel had been constructed — however, only in a non-liquor capacity. It was most likely built upon the same site as the later larger versions would stand on. This small first establishment would last around two years until the much larger second version build began in March 1888 (see the version one timeline below for full details).

In March 1888, tenders were called for the construction of a major 20-room hotel at Como by master building contractor Robert Fielding (on behalf of George Agnew). However, this decision had been made at the same time when the majority of the temporary railway workers with their families had already begun moving out of Como and heading further south with the ongoing extension of the Illawarra railway line. In effect, George was building a bigger, grander hotel that would be reliant on a rapidly dwindling population to survive — in hindsight, a very poor business decision.

By 9 July 1890, leasing agent W.H. Tulloh was advertising the new, grand "Como Hotel" for purchase or lease. It seems George Agnew may have over-extended spending to get the grand second version of the hotel completed. Unsurprisingly, with the 1890 Depression in full swing, there were no takers for an expensive-to-run hotel, especially in a tiny town with a declining populace and no public school. With no further takers after more advertisement in October 1890, George Agnew was forced to apply himself for a Publicans' License. He struggled on, operating the "Como Hotel" until he could sell it to Daniel Sullivan in September 1891. By 1894, George Agnew was still in financial difficulty, being forced to sell all his household furniture and effects from his Como residence.

The second establishment of the Como Hotel was frequented by the Australian poet Henry Lawson, who lived at Como in the early 1900s. Local legend has it that Lawson "used to row a boat from his house to the hotel and sell or recite his poems for beer."

Unfortunately, the tale of poor business woes for successive owners of the "Como Hotel" was to continue for many more years, as the tiny, slowly re-growing population, the terrible economic effect of WW1, the 1930s Depression & WW2 all took their toll on the business (see Timeline from 1890–1925 below for full details).

In 1939, the Como West Post Office was opened, along with the first classroom(s) at the new Como West Public School.

Como West was severely affected by bushfires in 1994, with upwards of 70 houses burnt down. Como West Public School was also destroyed by the fires, and a new school was built on the original land.

The second version of the Como Hotel was destroyed on 3 November 1996, after an electrical fault in the restaurant kitchen started a massive blaze. A sympathetically styled third version reconstruction was completed five years later on the same site in 2001.

== Boatbuilding/hire ==
By early 1884, the Murphy brothers partnership had built and were managing the first commercial boathouse and boat hire facilities at Como, which is located just east of where the rail bridge over the Georges River was later to be constructed.

Como had also been developing a reputation (reported in the newspapers of the time) for skilled boat building, with suitable facilities located on the south bank of the Georges River, near where the future rail bridge was to be built. On Saturday, 17 January 1885, it was reported that the "Active" – a large steamer constructed of kauri, spotted gum, and ironbark, being 115 ft in length, weighing 150tons, with 40 hp paddle steam engines, was successfully launched at Como. She was built by Mr. Harry Stephens for Messrs C. & E. Miller (one of the Illawarra Railway Line contractors) and was intended to carry railway materials from South Australian ports.

In June 1885, it was noted in the Evening News that "Near the bridge the Holt-Sutherland Company are erecting a fine jetty where the largest vessels can anchor at high tide" (it would be safe to presume this refers to the same one depicted in numerous old photos of the time which show a large new jetty east of James Murphy's boathouse).

On 25 January 1886, a Tender was placed in the Sydney Morning Herald by James Murphy (manager) for "Leasing Boathouse, Residence, and slip near the railway platform, Como"

On 16 February 1894, it was reported in the Evening News (Sydney) that the boat hire business of H.C. Press & Sons was forced to close down their operations following a successful Court appeal against their application for Lease by their main competition – James F. Murphy & F.S.E. Holt.

On 17 May 1894, it was reported in the Sydney Morning Herald that another boat hire operator, Mr. John H. Wills, had been successful in obtaining a lease on the western side of the Como Station for a boat shed and wharf.

Unfortunately for Mr. Wills, not long after he opened his boat hire business, on 7 December 1895, the Evening News reported that "Wills's boatshed, at Como, had been destroyed to-day by fire".

On 18 November 1898 an advertisement appears in the Evening News "FIRST-CLASS BOATS FOR HIRE AT COMO, by H.C. Press. Trial solicited", indicating he had been successful in Appealing the previous decision, which now allowed them to re-open their floating multi-story Palace Hall and boat hire sheds for business once more. Press's boat sheds held 64 wooden craft (mostly rowing skiffs). Their facilities were located immediately adjacent to the eastern side of the southern bridge abutment (just west of Murphy's Boat House facilities). They can be seen in numerous historical images of the time.

By 1899, with the population of Sydney expanding rapidly southwards (thanks to the extension of the Illawarra railway line through the opening of the railway bridge across the Georges River at Como), the demand for riverboat tours along the Georges River upstream from Como had grown to the point where a large 200 passenger paddle steamer called the S.S. "Telephone" began making return tours to the Parkesvale Pleasure Grounds (now Picnic Point) from J.H. Wills Boat House & jetty located on the western side of Como Station.

Circa 1905/1906, advertisements for H.C. Press & Sons Ball Room & Boat Hire facilities at Como cease, instead of advertising their other Woolloomooloo Bay boating facilities.

On 22 May 1920, an advertisement is placed in the Sydney Morning Herald by receivers J. Sydney Smith (Como), M. Maloney & J. Roberts, for the Estate of the late John F. Murphy (one of James Murphy's brothers and business partner) for the sale of the "FEDERAL BOAT LETTING COMPANY, COMO...The assets consist of about sixty (60) light cedar varnished skiffs, which are stored in two boatsheds, one of which is a floating pontoon, above which is erected a large hall. There is also a four-roomed dwelling above a large workshop, also two wharves at side of sheds."

== Illawarra Railway Line ==
=== Georges River railway bridge and Como Station ===
On 12 September 1882, Tenders were called for constructing the first section. C. and M. Millar won the contract to build the section from Redfern to Waterfall, crossing the Georges River and into the Holt-Sutherland Estate via the Double Bay paddock.

It was reported on 27 September 1884 in the Australian Town & Country Journal that the station for Como would be located "at the rear of the Worinora Hotel".

On 26 December 1885, the original single-track Como railway bridge spanning the Georges River began first services, with the opening of the bridge and single platform railway station at Como.

Rather alarmingly, it was not until 19 January 1886 (a month after opening) that the New South Wales Government Railway testing engineer carried out an initial load strength safety test on the bridge.

Also of interest is the media report on 2 March 1886 (3 months after the official opening) that construction of the initial station building was still underway.

The original layout of this single track and platform with a small station building on the east side of the track can be seen in a very rare early image circa mid-1886, held by the State Library of Victoria

Although "Woronora" had already proven popular with Sydney fishermen, small-boat sailors, and picnickers from the early 1880s, upon the eagerly anticipated opening of the new railway bridge at Como in January 1886, the locality immediately became far more popular as a weekend retreat for city folk venturing southwards on the Illawarra Line. The natural environment at Como made it popular for river cruises, and holidaymakers and trains were reported as being overcrowded on their first day of service along the newly extended section reaching Sutherland.

The rapid increase in passenger demand was such that by Feb 1891, the small single platform and station building located on the eastern side of the original single track were being replaced with dually extended station platforms, one on the east and one on the west side flanking a short section of single railway track over the bridge in the form of gauntlet track. In addition, a larger station building on the western station platform replaced the much smaller one that had originally stood on the single eastern platform.

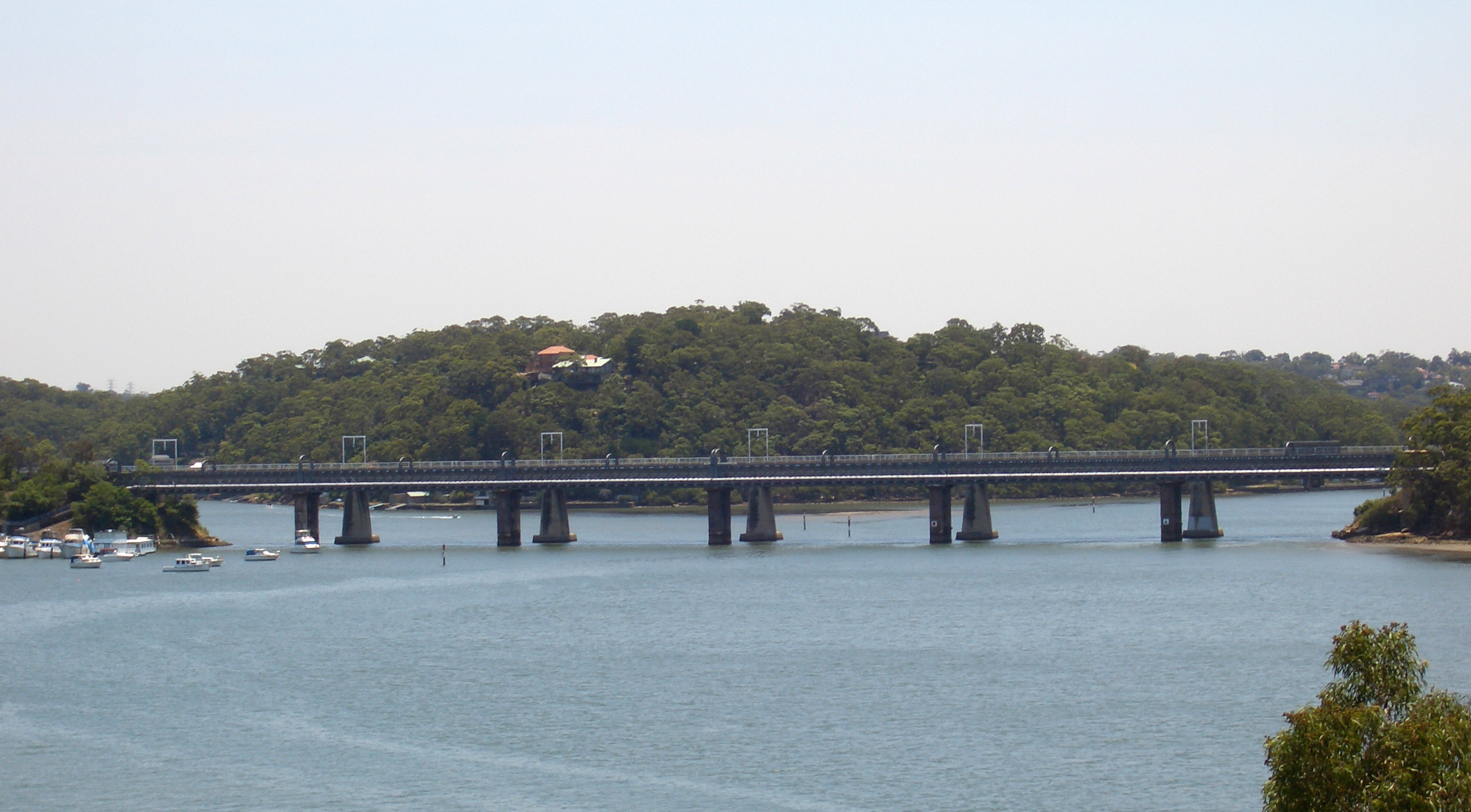
Old (closer) and new Como bridges

Since 1942, the original Georges River rail bridge has carried Sydney Water's pipeline, which runs from Woronora Dam to the Penshurst Reservoirs.

In 1972, a new concrete dual-track railway bridge was constructed to the west of the original Como Railway Bridge. It eliminated the bottleneck imposed by the original Gauntlet track design which had limited service numbers on the increasingly busy Sutherland line. A new Como railway station was built 800m further to the south, and the old station was demolished. The original Como Railway Bridge has been converted for use by pedestrians and cyclists.

== Hotels and accommodation ==
The first hotel to open in the area (circa 1883) was reported somewhat confusingly in newspapers of the day as either the "Woronora", "Woniora", "Wiganora" or "Worinora" Hotel (see Timeline below for details).

Newspaper references to a second, larger establishment that was constructed circa January 1887 and known generally as the "Como Hotel" do not appear until June 1887 (also see Timeline further down page for extensive detail)

=== The Woronora Hotel ===
==== Timeline ====
- Circa 1882/83 – First established by proprietor Mr Thomas Hanley (aka Handley), the "Woronora Hotel" was a "humble hostelry" – a modest size weatherboard & iron roofed building, located near the southern shore of the Georges River & close by the first railway workers' tent camp, that also contained worker's wives & children, for a total population of around 120.
- 12 May 1883 – A notice in the Sydney Morning Herald states – "POST OFFICES. – Post offices will be established on the 16th instant, at Como (Railway Crossing, George's River), near Woniora;" This is the first public reference to the fact that the old locality of "Woronora" had officially been changed to "Como" (on the suggestion of James Murphy, manager of the Holt-Sutherland Co.) The "Como Post Office" was built adjacent to Hanley's "Woronora Hotel" & Thomas managed both businesses.
- 10 July 1883 – A report in the Sydney Morning Herald on the progress of the Illawarra Railway Line extension at Georges River states – "The other side of the river near to the mouth of the Woronora presents a busy scene. Here the line begins to pass over the Holt-Sutherland Estate. There is a little town of canvas, with an hotel of weatherboards and a post-office of currugated iron. This post-office is called "Como", on account of the beauty of its natural surroundings and the lovely lake-like character of George's River from this point to the eastward, second only to the celebrated "Lago di Como", so well known to travellers on the continent of Europe". However, Thomas Hanley retained the name "Woronora Hotel" for his small enterprise located adjacent to the "Como Post Office".
- 17 May 1884 – Australian Town and Country Journal (Sydney) reports that at Como, Georges River, "There is a capital hotel called the Worinora, kept by Mr Hanley."
- 15 September 1884 – The Evening News (Sydney) reported a destructive fire had destroyed Mr Hanley's Post Office & store next to his "Worinora Hotel" with the loss of all postal records. An enquiry was held in October with an open finding.
- 27 September 1884 – The Australian Town and Country Journal reports that at Como, Georges River, "The petition of the inhabitants, relative to a railway station, has at length been acceded to, the site chosen being at the rear of the Worinora Hotel."
- 8 November 1884 – By this time, the population of Como had more than quadrupled. The Illawarra Mercury reports that Como "boasts 500 or 600 souls. Most of the residences are of canvas, but there are a few of weatherboard and corrugated iron. Amongst the most substantial looking of these is the Public School and the Woronora Hotel".
- 29 December 1885 – A report in the Daily Telegraph titled "A Trip To Como And Sutherland" notes – "At present there is only a platform at Como, but an embryo hotel is visible as the sign of a coming civilisation". The "emryo hotel" referred to being the otherwise titled "Woronora Hotel".
- Mid 1886 – A rare, historic photo taken shortly after the first single track Como Station had been constructed in early 1886 shows a small iron roof building located directly below and to the left of the station building, most likely being the "Woronora Hotel". There can be seen some railway workers' tent lines nearby (the majority of workers had by then moved 3 miles or further southwards with the completion of the bridge crossing and first cuttings). There are no signs whatsoever of any building activity further along the line, at the exact site where construction of the first version of George Agnew's "German Club" aka the "Como Hotel" would later be completed circa January 1887.
- 6 November 1886 – The Evening News (Sydney) reported that due to a lack of space at the school to accommodate 200 visiting members of the Fruit Growers Union who had travelled to Como for a picnic (which was washed out from rain) "Mrs Stephenson of the Woronora Hotel, very kindly threw open her private rooms for the use of those (ladies) who were crowded out of the schoolroom".
- 28 December 1886 – A critique in the Sydney Morning Herald laments the lack at Como of "...a suitable place for the refreshment of the inner man. The Wiganora (sic) Hotel, respectably as it is conducted by Mr William Stevenson, is altogether inadequate for the demands made upon it at holiday time" and continues "...the owners of the Holt-Sutherland Estate might well consider whether it would not be to their interest to grant some enterprising capitalist a lease upon such liberal terms as would induce public to the district". This may have led the Holt-Sutherland Estate partners to invest in starting to build what would become the 1st version of the Como Hotel, with its first Licensee to be George Agnew.
- 24 May 1887 – In the meantime, following the public criticism (above), some renovations and extensions must have been made to the Woronora Hotel, as what would be the last advertisement for the fully licensed "Woronora Hotel" was placed in the Sydney Morning Herald, proclaiming – "COMO. COMO. COMO. – WORONORA HOTEL, Como, George's River. This hotel is now open. If you wish to spend an enjoyable day visit Como on Queen's Birthday, where you can get wines, spirits, and beers, of best brands. Also Pleasure and Fishing Boats for Hire.". Also note that the newly constructed competitor for the tourist trade becoming known in the media as "Agnew's Hotel" or simply the "Como Hotel" was NOT licensed at that time to serve liquor.
- 25 May 1887 – A reporter in an article about the recently opened Illawarra Line at Como, makes mention of "An hotel known as the Woronora Hotel, which marks another stage in the progress of the place, has just been opened at Como, and will, no doubt, prove a great convenience to visitors on holidays and other occasions".

Within a month, the newly constructed first version of the "Como Hotel" (though with only a provisional license, not yet legally able to sell alcohol) had advertised "Open for business", with meals and accommodation for pick-nickers, day-trippers and tourists. It appears this increased competition for income from wealthier tourists visiting Como from this new, larger hotel caused the lesser "Woronora Hotel" to be closed down (presumably within the same year) since no more articles or advertisements referring to the "Woronora Hotel" are to be found in the various newspapers of the time following the last advertisement listed here.

=== The Como Hotel ===
There appear to have been three (3) distinct versions of the Como Hotel over time.

==== Original ====
The first version of the "Como Hotel" was relatively small, made of weatherboard and iron-roofed. Its construction was most likely funded by the Holt-Sutherland Estate partners (who owned all the commercial land leases at Como). It was completed circa Jan 1887 by the remaining immigrant railway workers (and was known colloquially as the "German Club"). However, it appears from subsequent newspaper advertisements of the time to have been licensed for accommodation only (those "refreshment needs" being served by Mr William Stevenson, a new Licensee of the so-called "Woronora Hotel" nearby). Unlike the advertisements for the "Woronora Hotel" espousing the availability of all forms of liquor, the first advertisements being placed by George Agnew for the early version of the "Como Hotel" NEVER mention the availability of spirits or alcoholic drinks – only meals, tea, coffee, accommodation, fishing, shooting, boat hire etc.

===== Timeline =====
- 28 December 1886 – A critique in the Sydney Morning Herald laments the lack at Como of "...a suitable place for the refreshment of the inner man. The Wiganora (sic) Hotel, respectably as it is conducted by Mr William Stevenson, is altogether inadequate for the demands made upon it at holiday time" and continues "...the owners of the Holt-Sutherland Estate might well consider whether it would not be to their interest to grant some enterprising capitalist a lease upon such liberal terms as would induce public to the district".[43] This may have led the Holt-Sutherland Estate partners to invest in starting to build what would become the 1st version of the Como Hotel, with its first Licensee to be George Agnew.
- Circa Jan 1887 – Work on constructing the 1st (much smaller) build of the "Como Hotel" was completed mostly by the available remaining German & Italian railway workers, apparently followed by a few months of equipping & fitting out.
- 2 May 1887 – James Murphy, manager of the Holt-Sutherland Estate Land Co., Limited, places an advertisement in the Sydney Morning Herald for the "LEASE OF HOTEL AT COMO" adding "The Buildings have just had extensive alterations and additions made, and a NEW LICENSE HAS BEEN GRANTED".
- 20 June 1887 – The first advertisement appears in the Sydney Morning Herald for "AGNEW'S COMO HOTEL. If you wish to spend an enjoyable day, don't forget to visit COMO. The scenery cannot be surpassed in the colony. First class accommodation for visitors. Luncheon provided. Also splendid fishing grounds. Boats for Hire. GEORGE AGNEW, PROPRIETOR" Note that this advertisement mentions accommodation & meals only, since a Publican's License to legally sell liquor had not been granted.
- 1 January 1888 – In what should have been a boon for both Hotels, the first major sale of residential land blocks at Como (comprising 119 Lots) was undertaken on behalf of the Holt-Sutherland Estate by agents Richardson & Wrench.
- 17 March 1888 – An advertisement is placed in the Sydney Morning Herald by George Agnew for the "COMO HOTEL, Como, George's River, Illawarra Line. Parties staying at Hotel can have use of private Boats for fishing &c. Tea and coffee at all hours. Terms moderate". Note that again, there is NO mention of any availability of liquor or alcoholic beverages. The tone is of a friendly, family oriented theme being promoted.

The definitive history and fate of the 1st version of the "Como Hotel" – apart from the scant few newspaper articles referred to here – is unclear. There appear to be no newspaper records relating to its initial construction, and no references that could help determine whether it was demolished outright and totally replaced by the second, much larger Edwardian styled version, or was simply incorporated into the second build (though that seems unlikely, given that the second version built circa 1888–1889 used 160,000 bricks in its ground floor).

==== Second version ====
The first version of the "Como Hotel" (also known colloquially as the "German Club") must have been considered inadequate for the ongoing plans of the Holt-Sutherland Estate partners, who wished to develop a large number of residential blocks at Como & thus needed to entice buyers to the area. Barely a year later, on 30 March 1888, it was reported that George Agnew (first proprietor of "Agnew's Como Hotel") had submitted plans & applied for a Conditional License to construct a much bigger, brand new 16 room hotel (on a new Lease within the Holt-Sutherland Estate at Como). The License for this new build was granted one month later, in April 1888. Tenders sought by building contractor Robert Fielding were called during Dec 1889 – Feb 1890 for sub-contractors to supply large quantities of building materials & carry out associated works, including the delivery of 160,000 bricks, quarrying local stone, providing and erecting large quantities of iron posts, railings & ornamental castings, providing plumbing & plastering work etc. Construction of this much grander, Edwardian-styled, multi-story Hotel establishment was completed by the end of June 1890. Early photos were taken circa 1894 clearly show the facade(s) bore an Establishment Year of "1890" in an artistic "cartouche" style, being a large "1" overlaid with a smaller "8", with "9" to the left and "0" to the right of the centrally aligned "1" & "8" combination.

Unfortunately, during 1890 Australian economic conditions worsened rapidly, with many large strikes crippling large industries (maritime, wool, coal etc.). The following 3 years saw a terrible economic Depression set in across the country. Unsurprisingly, due either to these prevailing poor business conditions (or just poor management), the first ten years of operation of the grand Edwardian styled version of the "Como Hotel" got off to a very rocky start. First proprietor George Agnew must have spent so much building the establishment that he was forced to advertise for a buyer/lessee soon after he had opened it. However, having failed to get a suitable buyer/lessee for his hotel after four months (Jul 1890 to Oct 1890), he himself was forced to apply for a Conditional Publican's License while continuing to search for a buyer/lessee. His Publican's License was granted on 17 October 1890.

With the general economy in ruins, George's Buy/Lease advertisements were getting no takers, & almost a year later in Sep 1891, "Como Hotel" owner/publican George & his wife were successfully sued by Tooth & Co. for a bounced cheque, being fined "£5 and costs, in default one month's imprisonment". Finally, on 25 September 1891 (almost 14 months after George's first Buy/Lease advertisement), a notice in the Australian Star newspaper listed George Agnew had transferred his Publican's License to a new Lessee & publican, Mr. Daniel Sullivan, thus signaling a tumultuous period for the "Como Hotel" involving rapid turnover of owners/Licensees (see the partial Timeline below for more detail). By the time Paul Buchholz had bought out the License on 16 February 1905, he had become the 12th Licensee in only 13½ years (exclusive of the 1st owner/Licensee, George Agnew).

In 1983, the "Como Hotel" was purchased by a unit trust company headed by Mr. Russell Coshott, who planned to "restore & upgrade the Hotel" by subdividing & selling as residential lots the adjoining two acres of freehold land. However, the plan was blocked by vehement local opposition.

On 16 July 1984, it was reported in the Sydney Morning Herald that "The elegant old Como Hotel, described as an Australian version of a Victorian period seaside pleasure palace, has been protected by a Heritage Council anti-demolition order. The four-story white stucco, brick and timber hotel in Cremona Road at the southern end of the Como railway bridge has been a landmark of the Georges River foreshores since the 1880s. In recent weeks controversy has raged in the Como community about plans by the owners to erect a four-story building of 42 flats and a carpark behind the hotel. The plans have been opposed by local resident and environmental groups. Sutherland Shire Council recently rejected the development application on several grounds. These included that the flats would have a detrimental impact on the scenic quality of the locality". (footnote – the article is mistaken in stating this version of the Como Hotel was Established in the 1880s – it should read from 1890).

Unfortunately, on 3 November 1996, the "Como Hotel" was ravaged by fire as a result of an unattended gas cooker in the restaurant kitchen.

===== Timeline 1888–1923 =====
- 30 March 1888 – Notice of Application was made in the Daily Telegraph (Sydney) by George Agnew for a Conditional Publican's License "for a house to be erected at Como, Georges River, containing 16 rooms exclusive of those required for the use of the family, and in accordance with the plans lodged with the Licensing Clerk, Sydney". This was for plans to either completely re-build his existing more modestly-sized "Como Hotel" or for approval to build a completely new larger structure, where the current version now stands.
- 18 April 1888 – George Agnew was granted a Conditional License "for an hotel at Como". Following the re-build/new construction, this new "Como Hotel" would go on to serve as the German workers' club throughout the duplication of railway lines and construction of the dual rail bridge. However, it still had to survive a rocky first few years of business, with the Lease passing through the hands of numerous Licensees.
- 15 January 1889 – George Agnew, licensee, "was fined £5 and costs, in default one month's imprisonment, for having committed a breach of the Licensing Act in selling liquor on a Sunday".
- 17 December 1889 – Multiple Tenders are invited by building contractor R. Fielding for "carting building materials from Como siding, Illawarra line, to back of Como Station", "Quarrying a large quantity of Stone, at Como, near station, Illawarra line" & "for 160,000 Bricks, delivered Como station, Illawarra line." This is all preparatory for the new build of the "Como Hotel".
- 12 February 1890 – Multiple Tenders are invited by building contractor Robert Fielding for "Plumbing of large Hotel at Como Station", "Plastering, &c., of large Hotel at Como Station" & "for a large quantity of Iron Columns, Balcony Railings, Ornamental Castings, &c., for large Hotel, Como". The completion of the new building work would have been circa early 1890, with a few more months for final equipping & fitting out.
- 9 July 1890 – The first Leasing advertisement is placed by agents W.H. Tulloh (on behalf of proprietor George Agnew) for "The new COMO HOTEL, COMO, Southern line, great holiday resort, grand shooting and fishing, the place for wedding parties, picnics, and holiday-makers generally; no other such chance offering anywhere. Duplication of railway line in immediate vicinity will give 800 men employment for possibly 18 months. Immediate possession, 12 years' lease, just built. Only principals".
- 9 October 1890 – George Agnew makes an Application for a Conditional Publican's license for his new 20 room hotel at Como.
- 14 October 1890 – With no success in finding a suitable Lessee after 3 months, a further Let/Lease advertisement is placed by agents W.H. Tulloh (on behalf of proprietor George Agnew) for the "COMO HOTEL, Como. Splendidly situated for holiday requirements; just finished regardless of expense every convenience, grand rooms, public and private bars, cellar unsurpassed, to be LET or LEASE, moderate terms; furnished or unfurnished; OR the property itself can be bought right out. Grand opportunity for sporting men with good connection".
- 17 October 1890 – A Conditional Publican's license is granted to George Agnew "for premises at Como".
- 10 September 1891 – A Court proceedings article in the Evening News reports that "Tooth and Co., brewers, George-street, sued George Agnew, of Como, George's River, licensed publican, and his wife, for the recovery of £26 1s. 3d, amount due with interest on a promissory note, made by the female defendant, dated July 4, 1889, and dishonored. A verdict was given for the amount claimed with costs of three witnesses."
- 25 September 1891 – Approximately 14 months had elapsed following the first Lease advertisement for the new "Como Hotel" before a notice in the Australian Star listed George Agnew transferring his License to the new Lessee & publican, Mr Daniel Sullivan.
- 5 December 1891 – New publican Dan Sullivan (late of Brisbane) advertised that he had opened the fully refurbished, no expense spared "Como Hotel", "It has no superior outside Sydney, and the Accommodation cannot be surpassed", "There is no Healthier Place in the Colony".
- 21 May 1892 – An advertisement was placed by Assigned Estate agents T.M. Hall for "Tenders for the Stock, Furniture, Goodwill, License, &c., of the Como Hotel (Illawarra Line)" The hospitality business for publican Dan Sullivan was clearly struggling, as he was close to Bankruptcy.
- 22 June 1892 – An Auction advertisement for the Assigned Estate of Daniel Sullivan was placed by agent T.M. Hall for "The whole of the FURNITURE, and EFFECTS of the COMO HOTEL, to be sold by auction upon the premises, Como, MONDAY, June 27." Shortly after the auction, Charles Martin Buck come into legal possession of the Hotel to the exclusion of licensee Daniel Sullivan.
- 22 July 1892 – An advertisement in the Australian Star newspaper shows a new hotel publican, George William Cubbon, had received the License for the "Como Hotel" from short-term de facto licensee Charles Martin Buck.
- 30 July 1892 – An advertisement was placed by new licensee George Cubbon for the opening under new management of the "Como Hotel".
- 9 August 1892 – The aged skeleton of an unidentified young female was discovered by the night officer in charge of Como Station, Mr George Morris, "about 300 yards from Como Station, and about the same distance from the Como Hotel, where the skeleton now lies. This is the second skeleton found under the same rock within less than a month." The bones were laid "on the table of Mr. Cubbon's hotel bar parlor" for the Police to inspect. In August an inquest for both skeletons found the female had been killed by a bullet to the left side of her skull & that a male aboriginal had been killed by unknown means. The "coroner returned an open verdict in accordance with the evidence".
- 21 October 1892 – A notice in the Evening News (Sydney) listed G.W. Cubbon had transferred his License to the publican, Mr John S. Gregory.
- 17 February 1893 – A notice in the Evening News (Sydney) listed John S. Gregory had transferred his License to new publican, Mr Charles H. Forwood.
- 20 December 1893 – In the Referee (Sydney) it is reported that Licensee Charles Forwood wishes to organize a shooting match in Como "Como is just in the centre of a good shooting district, and I am certain a prettier spot could scarcely be looked for out of Sydney. Mr Forwood will probably visit the Gun Club grounds next Friday for the purpose of interviewing shooters."
- 1 February 1894 – A Licensing Court notice in the Sydney Morning Herald listed Charles H. Forwood had transferred his License to new publican, Mr Charles Nicholson.
- 18 December 1894 – A Court proceedings article in The Australian Star (Sydney) reports "Sub-inspector Elliott proceeded against Charles Nicholson, licensee of the Como Hotel, Como, at the Newtown Court, yesterday, on a charge of having sold liquor on Sunday, December 9. A fine of £3 was imposed. The defendant was also fined 10s. for having permitted music on his premises."
- 5 September 1895 – A Licensing Court notice in the Daily Telegraph (Sydney) listed Charles Nicholson had transferred his License to new publican, Mr John Thomson. However, Mr Thomson fell ill.
- 24 October 1895 – A Licensing Court notice in the Australian Star (Sydney) listed Charles Buck (in lieu Mr Thomson) had transferred the License to new publican, Mr Henry (aka Harry) A. Brett.
- 25 March 1897 – A Licensing Court notice in the Sydney Morning Herald listed Henry (aka Harry) Arthur Brett had transferred his License to new publican, Mr Sidney Mortimer Staples.
- 15 March 1898 – Funeral notice for Mr John Thomson, formerly of the Como Hotel.
- 15 July 1898 – An Auction advertisement was placed by agent C.W. Maddocks & Co. for "The LEASE, LICENSE, GOODWILL, and FURNITURE" of the Como Hotel."
- 13 October 1898 – A Licensing Court notice in the Sydney Morning Herald listed Sidney Mortimer Staples had been granted a renewal of his publican's license for the Como Hotel.
- 24 February 1900 – A Court proceedings article in the Sydney Morning Herald reports "Sidney M. Staples, licensee of the Como Hotel, Como, was charged with having between 1 and 2.30 p.m. on Sunday, Feb 11, kept his licensed premises open for the sale of liquor. Defendant was fined £3 and costs 5s 6d, in default 7 days' gaol."
- 2 July 1903 – A Licensing Court notice in the Australian Star (Sydney) listed S.M. Staples had transferred his License to new publican, Mr Dominic Joseph Trim.
- 12 September 1903 – A Licensing Court notice in the South Coast Times (Wollongongy) listed S.M. Staples had transferred his License to new publican, Mr J. Pauchon.
- 16 February 1905 – A Licensing Court notice in the Sydney Morning Herald listed J. Pauchon had transferred his License to new publican, Mr Paul Buchholz. This signaled a brief period of licensee stability for the next 8 years.
- 3 October 1913 – A Licensing Court notice in the Sydney Morning Herald listed Paul Buchholz had transferred his License to new publican, Mr Ernest Hope-Caten of South Africa.
- 17 July 1914 – A Licensing Court notice in the Sydney Morning Herald listed Ernest Hope-Caten had transferred his License to new publican, Mr Donald O'Donnell.
- 11 March 1916 – An auction notice for the sale of the entire going concern of the "Como Hotel" appeared in the Sydney Morning Herald However, on 18 March 1916 it was noted that the "Como Hotel" was passed in at the auction, failing to sell at the reserve of £2,200. Clearly, the business conditions for owning an Hotel midway during the First World War had deteriorated.
- 11 July 1919 – Finally, a Licensing Court notice in the Sydney Morning Herald indicates Donald O'Donnell was successful in transferring the License to new owner Edward Cliffe.
- 3 February 1920 – A Police Court notice in the Daily Telegraph (Sydney) reports that the licensee Edward Cliffe was fined for illegal Sunday trading.
- 28 October 1921 – A Licensing Court notice in the Sydney Morning Herald listed Edward Cliffe had transferred his License to new publican, Mr Alexander Lumb.
- 7 April 1922 – A Court notice in the St George Call notes licensee Sydney Watkins had been fined for illegal Sunday trading.
- 30 March 1923 – A Licensing Court notice in the Sydney Morning Herald listed Sydney Watkins had transferred his License to new publican, Mr David Thomas.

The rapid turnover of licensees for the Como Hotel continued for many years thereafter.

==== More recent developments ====
The existing "third" version of the "Como Hotel" was constructed five years after the second version had been destroyed by fire in 1996, with the rebuild (on the same site) completed in 2001, officially re-opened in 3 November 2001. It featured a modern but sympathetic interpretation of the 2nd version's Edwardian design – the new restaurant was aptly named "The Burnt Door," & it displays at its centre the charred remains of one of the hotel's doors which had been salvaged from the ashes of the inferno.

In early 2013, the current 3rd version of the "Como Hotel", located at 35 Cremona Road, sold for $4.6 million on a yield of 14.4% to the Riversdale Group. Towards the end of 2016, the Riversdale Group sold the "Como Hotel" for $5.6 million to the Oscars Hotel Group.

===== Establishment date clarification =====
The current (3rd) version of the "Como Hotel" bears an Establishment date (applied during 2001 construction) on the upper facades of "1878". However, all the publicly available research shows this is clearly incorrect. With the locality of "Como" not even coming into existence until early mid-1883 & the fact(s) that the original 1st version of the "Como Hotel" was not even completed construction until January 1887, nor was the second version construction completed until early 1890, the currently displayed date of "1878" is clearly wrong. This has led to many other less comprehensively researched articles regarding the "Como Hotel" quoting the historically incorrect Establishment date of "1878", rather than what should be the factual Establishment date of "1890" (also confirmed by a vintage photo circa 1894 of the second version's facade).

== Transport ==
Como railway station is on the Eastern Suburbs & Illawarra Line of the Sydney Trains network. Como is the first station after crossing the Georges River from Oatley in the St George area. Como is approximately 35 minutes from Sydney Central.

Although the idea had been proposed in the early years, no road bridge was ever constructed across the George's River at Como.

== Landmarks ==
The Como Hotel is an Edwardian-styled hotel that was extensively rebuilt in 2001 after a large fire had destroyed the original 2nd version back in November 1996. It is easy to watch the local rugby league football from the balconies of this hotel. Dining can be had at the aptly named "Burnt Door" restaurant within.

The Sydney rock oyster can found around the Como foreshore.

== Schools ==
Como features two well-regarded public schools: Como Public School and Como West Public School

=== Como Public School ===
The original name for the first school to be built in the locality was actually called the "Worinora School". This name was changed shortly after it was completed construction in late 1883 to "Como Public School".
The school was located about 100 metres south of the southernmost extent of what would later become known as Scylla Bay. The site of the first school (with adjacent flagpole and school masters house) can clearly be seen in a photo of the area, taken circa 1894 AFTER the school had been closed down for good).

==== Timeline 1883–1923 ====
===== Old school =====
- 5 May 1883 – The Evening News (Sydney) reports "NEW SCHOOL. – It is proposed to establish a public school at Worinora, George's River."
- 25 September 1883 – The Evening News (Sydney) reports "...tenders, in connection with public schools, have been accepted by the Government:- ... Worinora, wooden building, R. G. Troughton, £199 4s."
- Feb 1884 – The school opened for the first time, according to New South Wales Government Records.
- April 1884 – The Sydney Morning Herald reported "The school was opened in April 1884, by Mr Halsted, who, however, left on account of no residence being provided".
- May 1884 – Change of name from "Worinora Public School" to "Como Public School" according to New South Wales Government Records
- 14 June 1884 – The Australian Town & Country Journal reports "Considerable improvements are likely to be shortly effected at the grounds of the Como public school, in the welfare of which institution the inhabitants display a very laudable interest." Albeit "the inhabitants" at that time were almost entirely temporary railway workers & their families.
- 10 February 1885 – The Sydney Morning Herald reports "On Friday last several gentlemen from Sydney paid a visit to the Como Public School, and were much pleased with the manner in which the work of the school was being proceeded with", also "The land upon which the school is erected is leased from the Holt-Sutherland estate, and commands a most charming view of the George's River", and "The present teacher, Mr. Edgar Robinson, took charge in May, when there were 38 pupils enrolled. For last quarter ending December 27, the enrolment was 85, and average attendance 56.6,"
- 26 March 1885 – A letter to the Evening News (Sydney) reads "BRAVO, THE MEN! – A correspondent says:- I wish to correct a mistake in connection with the presentation of toys to the Como public school children. Your report says that the toys were presented to the children by Sydney ladies. I wish to state, in justice to those who so kindly subscribed for them, that there was none given by Sydney ladies; but by the men employed on the railway. Since the toys were merely handed out of their packings by a Sydney lady to each successful competitor, nothing more. – A. NAVVYESS." A "Navvyess" refers to a wife of a railway navvy (a labourer).
- October 1885 – The first version of the "Como Public School" is closed for good, owing to a significant decline in the local population as the temporary railway worker camps moved further south along the Illawarra line extensions. It appears the buildings were retained for some years later, with the old school building, flagpole & headmaster's house seen in the background of the 1894 photo of the Como Hotel. An aerial photo dated 1930 shows the old school building(s) site had been completely cleared many years previous to the photo.

===== Current school =====
- 21 January 1921 – A report in the Propeller (Hurstville) states "The public school recently erected at Como will be officially opened by Mr. Mutch (Minister for Education) on Saturday afternoon, Jan. 29." The site of the new school was at the corner of Cremona & Genoa Streets, Como (approx. 100m further south from the site of the original school).
- 1 September 1922 – The Propeller (Hurstville) reports "...the Education Department has decided to provide additions to the Como Public School at a cost of £850. The school, which has been in existence less than two years, is already overcrowded, and with the rapidly-increasing population the need for additional school accommodation becomes more urgent".
- 16 November 1923 – The Propeller (Hurstville) reports "The new additions to Como Public School were opened on Friday last by Mr. J.B. Telfor, M.A., Assistant Under-Secretary of the Department of Education".

=== Como West Public School ===
The original Como West Public School was sited at the corner of Warraba Street & Wolger Street, Como West. This first school was later completely destroyed in the devastating 1994 Como West bush fires.

==== Timeline 1949–1994 ====
===== Old school =====
- 1939 – First weatherboard classroom(s) constructed.
- 13 October 1948 – The Construction magazine states "The Minister for Education, Mr. R.J. Heffron, has approved of the establishment of an infants'school at the corner of Woronora Crescent and Warraba Street, Como West." This site is in the corner of the Como West Public School grounds. The building would later become a Scout Hall.
- 10 March 1949 – A notice in The Propeller (Hurstville) states "...a tender for the erection of accommodation at the Como West Public School has been accepted. It is expected that the contractor will commence the erection of a double portable classroom in about three weeks' time, and the building will be completed and ready for occupation with as little delay as possible."
- 20 March 1952 – An advertisement in The Propeller (Hurstville) "Teacher's Office, Children's Weather Shed. Plans can be inspected at school, Como West Infants', Cnr. Warraba and Wolger Rds., West Como."
- 8 January 1994 – The weatherboard & corrugated iron roof buildings of the original "Como West Public School" are completely destroyed during a devastating bush fire that swept through Como West & Como.

===== Current school =====
- 1994 – "Como West Public School" was completely re-built after the devastating 8 January 1994 Como West bush fires.

== Sport and recreation ==
Como is home to the St. George Rowing Club. Many renowned rowers begin their sculling careers here.

Como also features a number of parks, including Scylla Bay Oval (home to the successful Como-Jannali Crocodiles) and the historic Como Pleasure Grounds, home to the Como Swimming Club with swimming baths and a freshwater pool.

There is a pleasant public park originally called the "Henry Lawson Memorial Reserve" (so-named at a large public ceremony held before 600 attendees on 19 September 1954) which is accessed via both Wolger and Bulumin Streets in Como West which was, and still is, very popular with local inhabitants and their children with a modern playground to entertain. The original big swings and chrome steel "slippery dip" were installed circa 1954 on account of the West Como Progress Association. The park has been known to locals as "the blue fence park", which has now changed to "the black fenced park" due to the recent renovation of the park.

== Como population ==
=== Population timeline ===
- 1883 – May 1883 – Approx. 120 inhabitants total, comprising mainly temporary railway workers, some with families.
- 10 July 1883 – A report in the Sydney Morning Herald states "There is a little town of canvas, with an hotel of weatherboards and a post-office of corrugated iron. This post-office is called "Como"" and "There are hundreds of men, women, and children living in the vicinity of this point..."
- 8 November 1884 – Report in the Illawarra Mercury states "The second section of the railway commences at a place called Como, which owes its present activity and local habitation solely to the railway works. Just now it boasts of something like a population of 500 or 600 souls". This number would have dropped significantly by mid 1885, since most of the railway workers with their families kept moving southwards out of Como with the rapid extension of the Illawarra line though Sutherland, Heathcote and beyond.
- 18 April 1885 – It was reported in the Australian Town and Country Journal that "Business is slack just now, owing to the exodus of population up the line; but good judges state that in a brief period Como will become a thriving settlement. Already land is being rapidly cleared for sale, with fine water frontages, and there should be good hotel prospects by-and-bye". The "good judges" referred to here were most likely representatives of the Holt-Sutherland Estate Land Co., keen to further their prospects.
- 9 May 1885 – A report on Como in The Australian Town & Country magazine noted "The population is steadily moving up the line, and a continued increase from the 24-mile to the 30-mile takes place daily. Consequently last pay night was dull at Como, and business residents are also thinking of moving."
- 6 October 1885 – It is reported in the Sydney Evening News that "...the Government intends to erect a platform at Como, where there is a gradient of 1 in 44, and where there are no settlers at all;"
- 1886–1890 – Como's total population (both permanent and temporary) would have remained very low. Even the first Como land sales conducted by the Holt-Sutherland Estate during the period 1887–1890 went mainly to a handful of wealthier developers, who then had trouble in on-selling these residential lots in any significant numbers once the economic conditions deteriorated even further towards the beginning of the 1890s.
- 1890–1894 – One of the worst financial & economic Depressions in Australia's history swept across the country during this period. It is unlikely the permanent population of Como grew at all during this period of significant financial hardship for many businesses – but especially so for many of the low to middle income class workers who lost their jobs. Ironically, it was at this exact moment the new, grander Edwardian styled "Como Hotel", ostensibly designed by the Holt-Sutherland Estate investors to attract permanent residents to Como in conjunction with their proposed Land sales, began trading. The subsequent lack of sufficient population growth or spending in Como ensured these early years for the (numerous) Licensees who "tried their luck" investing in the "Como Hotel" were fraught with financial difficulties.
- 6 August 1931 – The first Catholic Mass was held in the School of Arts building in Como (70 residents attended), with a report in The Catholic Press stating "Settlement at Como dates back more than 50 years, but the town has for various reasons made little progress, and its population is still very small".
- 8 October 1952 – An article in the Weekly Times (Melbourne) mentions that "Mrs. Larkin senior is postmistress at Como (population 680)". This further supports the ample evidence that Como's permanent population had virtually stagnated for 68 years, following the temporary railway worker population boom of 1884.
- 2001 Australian Census – 3,673 people in 1,322 private dwellings.
- 2006 Australian Census – 3,736 people in 1,290 private dwellings.
- 2011 Australian Census – 3,789 people in 1,319 private dwellings.
- 2016 Australian Census – 3,977 people in 1,352 private dwellings.

=== Current demographics ===
According to the 2021 census of Population, there were 4,053 residents in Como. The most common ancestries in Como were English 43.0%, Australian 39.0%, and Irish 14.5%.

In Como, 91.3% of occupied dwellings were separate houses, compared to the national average of 72.3%. There was also a high rate of home ownership in Como, with only 10.6% of occupied private dwellings being rented.
