= Clayton Wesley Uniting Church =

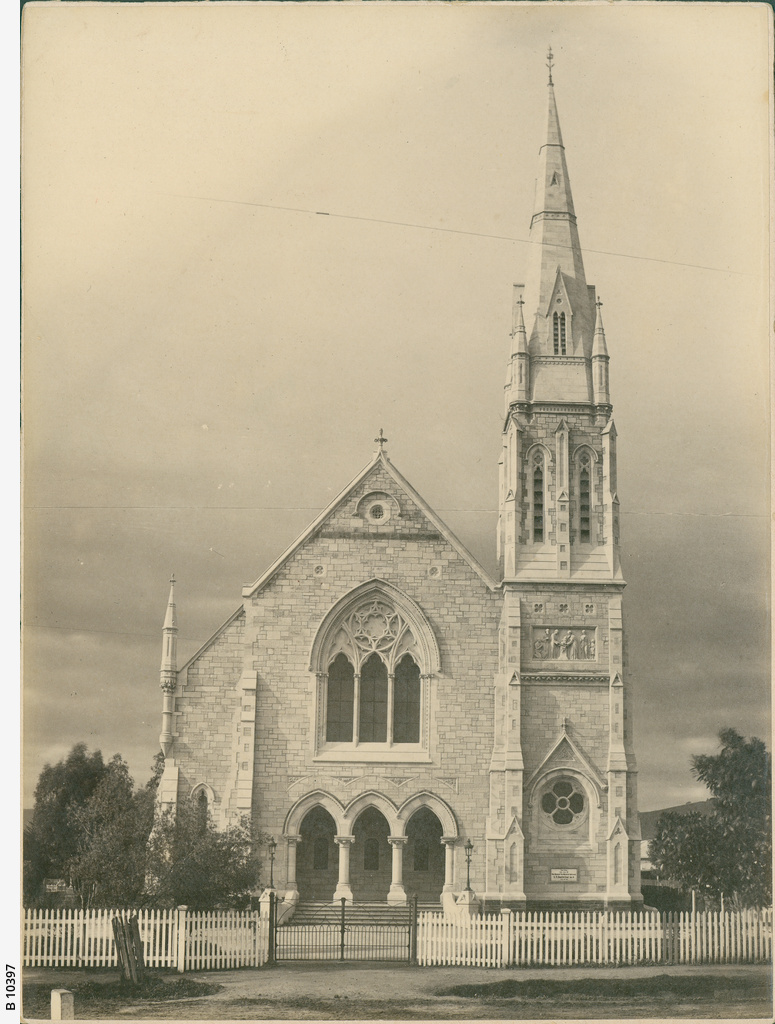
- Clayton Congregational Church, c. 1897.
- Clayton Wesley Uniting Church
- 34°55′15″S 138°38′29″E
- Address: 280 Portrush Road, Beulah Park, Adelaide, South Australia
- Country: Australia
- Denomination: Uniting (since 1977)
- Previous denomination: Congregational (1855 – 1977)
- Website: claytonwesley.ucasa.org.au

History
- Former name: Clayton Congregational Church
- Founded: 5 June 1855 (1st church); 27 June 1882 (2nd church)
- Founders: J. H. Barrow (1st church); E. T. Smith (2nd church)
- Dedication: Rev. John Clayton (1754–1843)
- Dedicated: 13 April 1856 (1st church); 17 May 1883 (2nd church)

Architecture
- Architect(s): Cumming & Davies
- Architectural type: Church

Specifications
- Capacity: 560 people
- Length: 20 metres (66 ft)
- Width: 15 metres (50 ft)

Administration
- Parish: Clayton

Clayton Wesley Uniting Church, formerly Clayton Congregational Church, is a Uniting church, located at 280 Portrush Road, Beulah Park, Adelaide, South Australia, Australia. The current building with its tall spire was built was built in 1883, although an earlier building, behind the present church and now known as the Lecture Hall, was built in 1856. The church is located in a commanding position at the eastern end of The Parade, Norwood.

== Establishment of the congregation ==
The first Congregationalists (or Independents as they generally called themselves) in Adelaide, led by Rev T. Q. Stow, met in a tiny building on North Terrace, Adelaide, and built their first chapel in Freeman Street (now Gawler Place), which opened for public worship on 1 November 1840. The second body of Congregationalists to form met in a small chapel in the north-west of Norwood from around 1840, and constructed a brick building in High Street, Kensington, on land contributed in 1844 by John Roberts (c. 1794–1875). Various ministers including T. Q. Stow and Rev. Thomas Playford (c. 1795–1873), father of the Premier, preached there until Rev. John Martin Strongman (c. 1815–1887) was appointed pastor in 1849. He drew large crowds, but left South Australia in 1853 without fanfare and never returned. Rev. Henry Cheetham took charge of the High Street church. Cheetham resigned from the High Street Church in May 1871 and Rev. William Nicholls was confirmed as his replacement in July. In September 1872 Cheetham was accepted as pastor of the church in Milang, where he served a grateful congregation until his death in 1881. Nicholls resigned in 1875, to be replaced by John Randall. By the end of the decade the church had no minister and the building was being used by the Bible Christian denomination.

== Establishment of the church building ==
=== First church building ===
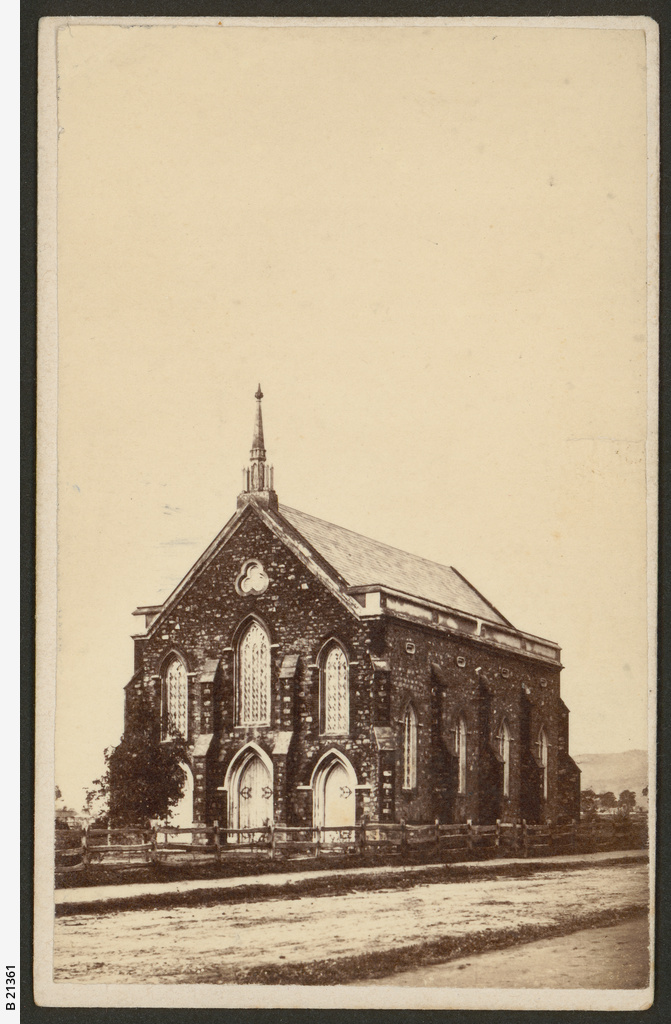
First Clayton Congregational Church, 1865

In November 1851 a breakaway group formed a separate church which met at Roberts's residence, "Maesbury House". Roberts, who was antipathetic to Stow, but later publicly reversed his opinion, may have led the breakaway in response to Stow's pastorate. They were still meeting at Maesbury House when their first pastor J. H. Barrow held a service there on 21 January 1854. An institute hall was hired for the first public meeting on 2 July 1854, and plans were made for a permanent chapel. The block of land settled on was 150 by 450 feet (46 m × 137 m) on the corner of Kensington Terrace and East Parade, Kensington (now Portrush Road and The Parade, Beulah Park).

The foundation stone for the building, which was designed by George Abbott, was laid on 5 June 1855 by Mr. Barrow. This was the original Clayton chapel, named at the suggestion or insistence of John Roberts, in memory of Rev. John Clayton (1754–1843) of London, whose three sons John, George and William were also Congregationalist ministers. The first service, held on 13 April 1856, was conducted by Revs. John Gardner (Presbyterian), Joseph Dare (Methodist), and T. Q. Stow.

Barrow resigned in 1858 to help found The Advertiser, which he edited for 15 years, and after an interim when services were held by Stow, was succeeded by the Rev. John William Cooper Drane (1823–1864), who preached his first sermon on 6 February 1859. Later that year the Rev. Drane started preaching (also?) at the High Street Church, and also ran a college in George Street, Norwood, which moved in mid-1860 to Tavistock Street in the city. In December 1860 he left for Ipswich, Queensland, where he ministered for three years and died of consumption (tuberculosis) on 24 December 1864. He was succeeded by Rev. William Harcus, who arrived in South Australia in late November 1860, and was to follow Barrow as a journalist and editor. He was followed in May 1866 by Eliezer Griffiths, who had been serving several congregations in Port Denison, Queensland.He left South Australia for England in December 1872. A manse on Kensington Terrace (now Portrush Road) had been built in 1868.

The Rev. Thomas Hope followed in May 1874. During his time considerable building work was undertaken: a schoolroom 36 by 25 feet (11.0 m × 7.6 m) and vestry 11.5 by 9.5 feet (3.5 m × 2.9 m) were built in 1876 to a design by Thomas English.

=== Second church building ===
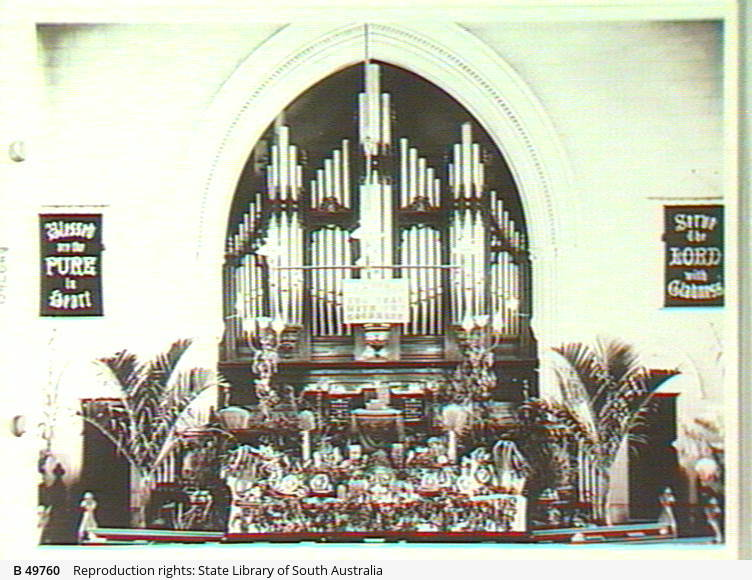
Pipe organ and decoration for Thanksgiving Festival, 1903

The congregation had grown to such an extent that a new, larger church building was called for, to be erected in front of the existing building. Promised donations from E. T Smith, Gilbert Wood and others would meet around half the cost. A design by Cumming & Davies (whose previous work included the College Park Congregational Church) for a building 66 by 50 feet (20 m × 15 m) seating 560 people was accepted and the foundation stone was laid by E. T. Smith on 27 June 1882. The building was completed and officially opened on 17 May 1883. The spire, at 125 feet (38 m) was the tallest in the colony.

The old building became the Church Hall. The Sunday school also grew in numbers, and a Young Men's Society and Young Christians' Union were founded and flourished. Hope resigned in August 1890, after sixteen years at Clayton.

In 1965 Clayton Church decided to establish Clayton Church Homes for the aged in Norwood, the first stage of which was opened in March 1968.

In April 1973 the Norwood Wesley Methodist and Clayton Congregational churches formally merged, just four years before their parent churches combined as the Uniting Church in Australia, and Clayton became Clayton Wesley Uniting Church. In October 2000, St Morris Uniting Church and Clayton Wesley Uniting Church congregations amalgamated.

=== Music ===
Clayton Wesley Uniting Church and, before the amalgamation, Clayton Congregational Church and Norwood Wesley Church, have a long history of using sacred music and choirs to enhance worship, build community, and reach out to and provide an ‘entry’ point for people to be involved in the Church and thus the life of faith. Current Director of Music, Mandy Hutchinson, oversees a budget that is used from time to time for regular Sunday worship service and particularly for special events like Christmas Eve and Easter Sunday, to welcome others into the Church's community.

Organists include Pip Parkin, Matthew Atherton, and Ashleigh Tobin, supported by guest musicians, including singers Rachel Bruerville, Andrew Linn, Macintyre Howie Reeves, Victoria Coxhill, and pianist James Huon George.

=== Notable laity ===
Notable lay members of the church included Thomas Caterer, Ebenezer Cooke, George Doolette, Henry Dunstan, Mr. and Mrs. W. D. Glyde, T. G. Griffin, Sir Herbert Phillipps, Sir Edwin Thomas Smith, Augustine Stow, George Wells, John Witty, Gilbert Wood and his son Peter.

== Clergy ==
Rev. Henry George Nicholls was the next incumbent. His ministry at Clayton began on 3 May 1891, and served for twelve years; his last sermon was preached at Clayton on 6 August 1903, when he left to take charge of the Presbyterian church in Canterbury, Victoria. The Rev. Joseph Robertson M.A., fresh from a very successful ten years at Stow Memorial Church, succeeded him; the appointment of the Australian-trained Robertson was heartily endorsed by Nicholls. In 1897 the pipe organ was removed to the College Park church, and a new instrument, built by J. E. Dodd & Sons of Adelaide, was installed and opened by the church organist on 8 September 1897. C. Hope Harris produced a history of the church for its Jubilee in 1906. At his well-attended farewell, Robertson was quick to acknowledge the active support of deacons Sir Edwin Smith and Peter Wood, and the organist William Sanders, among others.

The Rev. Ashley H. Teece, formerly of New Town, Tasmania, was inducted on 29 August 1909. At a special church meeting on 21 September 1910 broached the possibility of institutional work in the district. A contract was entered into in 1911 for the erection of a building to cost £1,139.

Two stalwarts of the church died: Sir Edwin Smith in December 1919 and Peter Wood two years later, and a pulpit was erected in their memory. On 20 April 1920, Teece resigned the pastorate.

Rev. Percival Watson, who had been pastor of the Summer Hill, New South Wales, church commenced his ministry in December 1920. In April, 1925, Mr. Watson received a second call from the Wharf street Church. Brisbane, and felt obliged to accept.

Arising from the suggestion of Rev. P. Watson, the Rev. C. C. Watts, assistant minister of Collins Street Independent Church, Melbourne, was called in July, and served until late 1929, when despite pleas from both Clayton and the newly formed Luhrs Road Church, South Payneham to remain, he accepted a call to Victor Harbor.

The Rev A. C. Newbury, minister of the Chatswood, New South Wales, Congregational Church accepted a call to take over the pastorate, and was inducted into Clayton Church at the end of February 1930. He left for the Henley Beach church in October 1940.

Rev. J. H. Ralph of Tasmania was offered the pastorate, but he declined, but Rev. T. Rees Thomas of Subiaco, Western Australia accepted and began at Clayton in February 1942. Late in 1947 he accepted a call to the City Church, Brisbane, where he served with distinction until 1981.

Rev J. F. Dickinson (22 November 1900 – 1975) was inducted to the pastorate on 5 September 1948 and served to 1955, when he took over the pastorate at Victor Harbor.
