= Winifred Kiek =

Australian Congregational minister

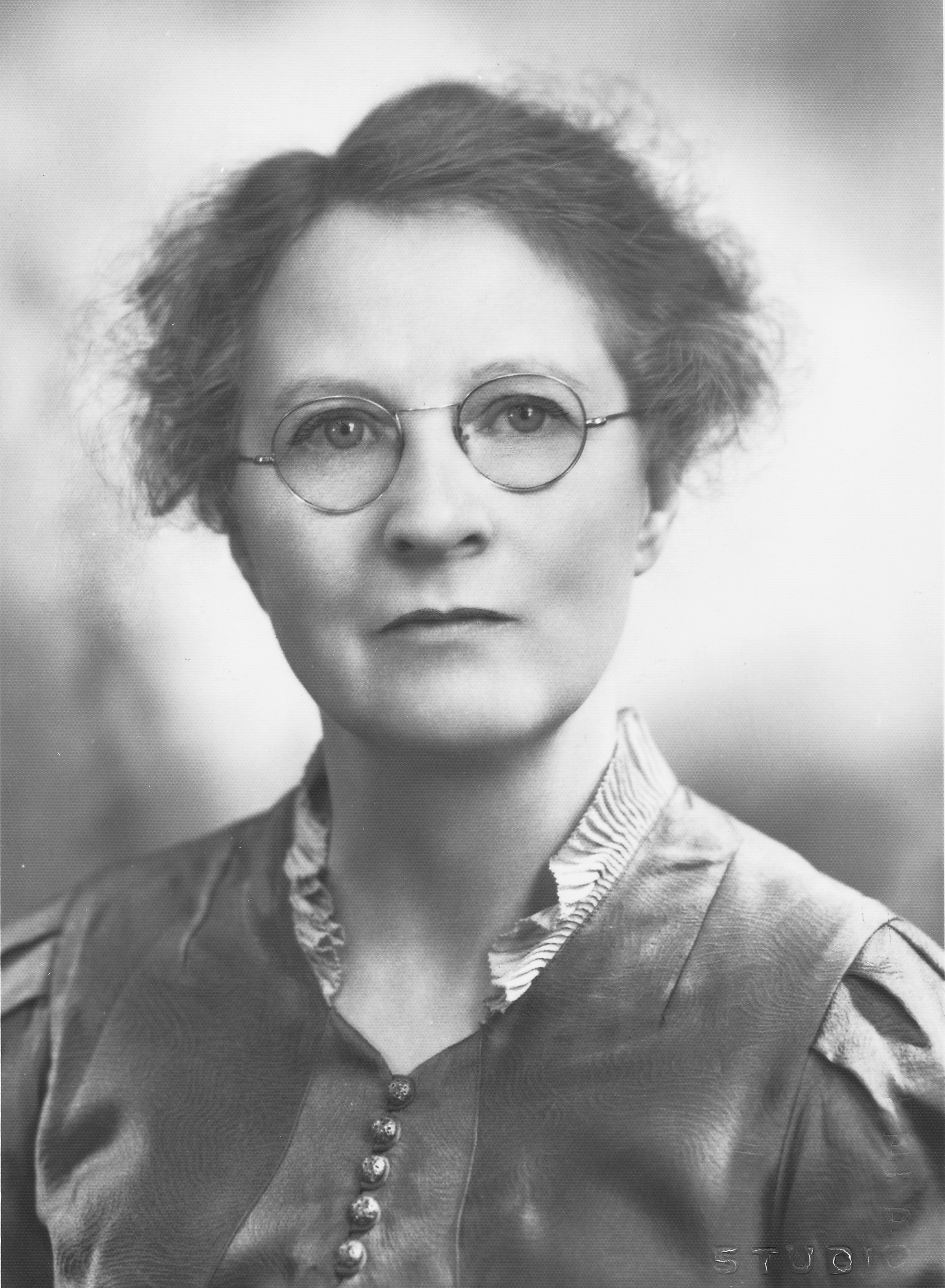
- Portrait in 1935 approx
- Born: Winifred Jackson; 27 July 1884; Manchester, United Kingdom
- Died: 23 May 1975 (aged 90)
- Spouse: Edward Sidney Kiek
- Children: 3
- Religion: Congregationalist
- Church: Congregational Union of Australia
- Ordained: 13 June 1927

Winifred Kiek (née Jackson; 27 July 1884 – 23 May 1975) was the first woman to be ordained in the Christian Ministry in Australia. She was ordained on 13 June 1927 in South Australia to the Congregational Union of Australia (now part of the Uniting Church in Australia).

== Personal life ==
Winifred was born in Manchester, England to John Robert Jackson, a tea salesman, and his wife Margaret, née Harker, who were Quakers

Winifred was educated at Urmston Higher Grade School, and at 16 she won a scholarship to Manchester Pupil Teacher Training Centre. In 1904 she entered the Victoria University of Manchester (B.A., 1907) where she won the university prize in logic; she became a schoolteacher.

She married Edward Sidney Kiek, a Congregational church minister, on 28 August 1911 at the Chorlton Road Congregational Church, Manchester; they had three children. After World War One, they migrated to Adelaide, South Australia where Edward Kiek became head of Parkin Congregational Theological College (later Parkin-Wesley College and now Uniting College for Leadership and Theology) in 1920.

Winifred died at Victor Harbor on 23 May 1975.

== Ordination and work ==
She studied theology and in 1923 she was the first woman to graduate with a Bachelor of Divinity (B.D.) from the Melbourne College of Divinity. In 1929 she took an M.A. in philosophy at the University of Adelaide.

From 1926 Winifred preached in the new Colonel Light Gardens Congregational Union Church (now Colonel Light Gardens Uniting Church). This was the church in which she was ordained in 1927, and where she served until 1933. She also served as minister of Knoxville Congregational Church in 1939-46, and preached frequently in Congregational and other churches. She lectured at Parkin College from 1930.

Winifred Kiek championed sexual equality and the women's movement from her arrival in South Australia. She was a member of the Women's Christian Temperance Union in South Australia and president in 1926; a member of the National Council of Women from the early 1920s, a convenor of its committee on equal moral standards in 1927-1931 and member of its committee for peace and arbitration from 1938-1950. She held office in the Women's Non-Party Association (later League of Women Voters), and in the Australian Federation of Women Voters. She was twice vice-chair of the Congregational Union of South Australia and acting chair in 1944-1945. She was also a member of the Pan-Pacific and Southeast Asia Women's Association, where she was a delegate to women's conferences in New Zealand (1952), Sri Lanka (1955), Iran (1960) and Japan (1966).

After World War II Winifred Kiek became the World Council of Churches liaison officer in Australia for work among women; in 1950 she joined the council's commission on the work of women in the Churches and attended its Oxford meeting in 1952. In 1953-56 she was convenor of the Australian Council of Churches commission on the co-operation of men and women in the Church, about which she wrote in We of One House (Sydney, 1954). She was twice vice-chairman of the Congregational Union of South Australia and acting chairman in 1944-45.

== Winifred Kiek Scholarship ==
The Winifred Kiek Scholarship for theological education of women in leadership, or charitable projects in the Asia-Pacific Region was named in her honor. The inaugural award was made in 1965. It is administered by Australian Church Women Inc. A notable recipient is Rev. Violet Sampa-Bredt, who was a member of parliament in democratic Zambia, and was the first woman ordained in that country.

Kiek Place, in the Canberra suburb of Chisholm, is named for Kiek and her husband.

She was posthumously inducted onto the Victorian Honour Roll of Women in 2001.
