= Opening of the Liverpool and Manchester Railway =

1830 railway opening in England

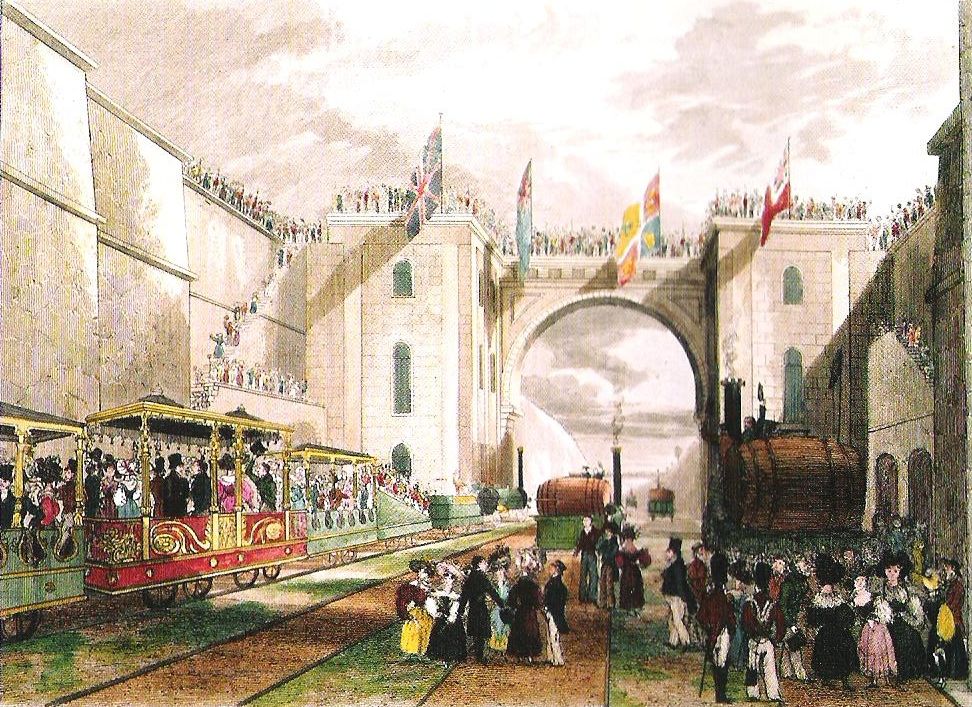
The Duke of Wellington's train and other locomotives being readied for departure from Liverpool, 15 September 1830

The Liverpool and Manchester Railway (L&M) opened on 15 September 1830. Work on the L&M had begun in the 1820s, to connect the textile mills of the city of Manchester with the nearest deep water port at the Port of Liverpool, 35 miles (56 km) away. Although horse-drawn railways already existed elsewhere, the Stockton and Darlington Railway had been running for five years, and a few industrial sites already used primitive steam locomotives for bulk haulage, the L&M was the first locomotive-hauled railway to connect two major cities, and the first to provide a scheduled passenger service. The opening day was a major public event. Arthur Wellesley, Duke of Wellington, the prime minister, rode on one of the eight inaugural trains, as did many other dignitaries and notable figures of the day. Huge crowds lined the track at Liverpool to watch the trains depart for Manchester.

The trains left Liverpool on time and without any technical problems. The Duke of Wellington's special train ran on one track, and the other seven trains ran on an adjacent and parallel track, sometimes ahead and sometimes behind the Duke's train. Around 13 miles (21 km) out of Liverpool the first of many problems occurred, when one of the trains derailed and the following train collided with it. With no reported injuries or damage, the derailed locomotive was lifted back onto the track and the journey continued. At Parkside railway station, near the midpoint of the line, the locomotives made a scheduled stop to take on water. Although the railway staff advised passengers to remain on the trains while this took place, around 50 of the dignitaries on board alighted when the Duke of Wellington's special train stopped. One of those who got off was William Huskisson, former cabinet minister and Member of Parliament for Liverpool. Huskisson had been a highly influential figure in the creation of the British Empire and an architect of the doctrine of free trade, but had fallen out with Wellington in 1828 over the issue of parliamentary reform and had resigned from the cabinet. Hoping to be reconciled with Wellington, he approached the Duke's railway carriage and shook his hand. Distracted by the Duke, he did not notice an approaching locomotive on the adjacent track, Rocket. On realising it was approaching, he panicked and tried to clamber into the Duke's carriage, but the door of the carriage swung open, leaving him hanging directly in the path of the oncoming Rocket. He fell onto the tracks in front of the train, suffering serious leg injuries, and died later that night.

The Duke of Wellington felt that the remainder of the day's events should be cancelled following the accident at Parkside, and proposed to return to Liverpool. However, a large crowd had gathered in Manchester to see the trains arrive, and was beginning to become unruly. Wellington was persuaded to continue to Manchester. By the time the trains reached the outskirts of Manchester the crowd had become hostile and was spilling onto the tracks. With local authorities unable to clear the tracks, the trains were obliged to drive at low speed into the crowd, using their own momentum to push people out of the way. Eventually they arrived at Liverpool Road railway station in Manchester to be met by a hostile crowd, who waved banners and flags against the Duke and pelted him with vegetables. Wellington refused to get off the train, and ordered that the trains return to Liverpool. Mechanical failures and an inability to turn the locomotives meant that most of the trains were unable to leave Manchester. While Wellington's train left successfully, only three of the remaining seven locomotives were usable. These three locomotives slowly hauled a single long train of 24 carriages back to Liverpool, eventually arriving six and a half hours late after having been pelted with objects thrown from bridges by the drunken crowds lining the track.

The death and funeral of William Huskisson caused the opening of the railway to be widely reported, and people around the world became aware that cheap and rapid long-distance land transport was now possible for the first time. The L&M became extremely successful, and within a month of its opening plans were put forward to connect Liverpool and Manchester with the other major cities of England. Within ten years, 1,775 miles (2,857 km) of railways were built in Britain, and within 20 years of the L&M's opening over 6,200 miles (10,000 km) were in place. The L&M remains in operation, and its opening is now considered the start of the age of mechanised transport; in the words of industrialist and former British Rail chairman Peter Parker, "the world is a branch line of the pioneering Liverpool–Manchester run".

== Background ==
=== Liverpool and Manchester Railway ===
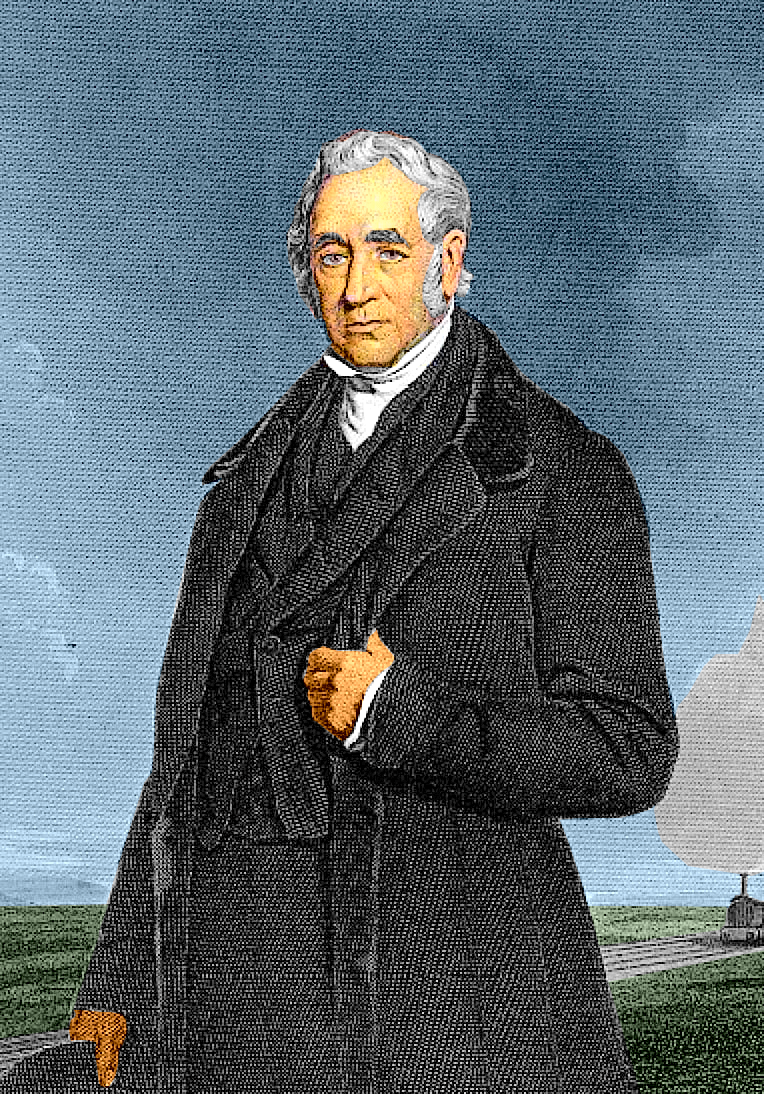
George Stephenson, engineer of the Liverpool and Manchester Railway

The Liverpool and Manchester Railway (L&M) was founded in May 1824 by Liverpool merchants Joseph Sandars and Henry Booth, (Note: Dawson notes the founders as Sandars of Liverpool and John Kennedy of Manchester. Booth wrote the company prospectus and was to be both secretary and treasurer, and was thus able to dominate the board and effectively operate as a general manager throughout the independent existence of the company.) (Note: The L&M project was instigated in 1821 by William James persuading Sandars to collaborate on his project, though various schemes for a railway had been mooted since at least 1802.) with the aim of linking the textile mills of Manchester to the nearest deep water port at the Port of Liverpool. At the time, the only means of bulk transport between the two towns other than animal-drawn carts was water transport on the Mersey and Irwell Navigation, the Bridgewater Canal and the Leeds and Liverpool Canal, all of which were slow and expensive to use; transporting raw cotton the 35 miles (56 km) from Liverpool to Manchester was as expensive as the initial cost of shipping it from America to Liverpool. Although horse and human powered railways had existed for centuries, and steam power was beginning to be used in some experimental industrial railways, the L&M was to be the first steam powered railway to provide an inter-city passenger service, and the most expensive engineering project yet undertaken in Britain. (Note: George Stephenson's short Canterbury and Whitstable Railway opened to passengers in May 1830, four months before the Liverpool and Manchester Railway, but used a mixture of cable haulage over inclines and a locomotive on the level sections, rather than using locomotives throughout.) (Because much of the Liverpool and Manchester Railway ran over land owned by investors in the company, and because many of the early locomotives were owned by the engineering firms which built them rather than by the L&M, it is impossible to give a precise figure for the L&M's construction costs. The direct construction cost of the line up to its opening was around £820,000, and the two years of lobbying necessary to get the railway authorised is estimated to have cost £70,000. In comparison, the Bridgewater Canal, which had the same purpose as the L&M in connecting Manchester to the Port of Liverpool, had cost an estimated £220,000 to build in the late 18th century. The average labourer's wage in the area at this time was around £20 per year.)

The Marquess of Stafford, owner of the Bridgewater Canal, was a friend of Liverpool's Member of Parliament William Huskisson, with whom he had worked at the British Embassy in Paris. Although the Marquess had initially feared the potential impact of railways on the income from his canal and had been strongly opposed to the railway, Huskisson persuaded him to allow the railway to use his lands and to invest in the scheme.

In 1826 George Stephenson was appointed to design and build the 35-mile (56 km) route. Stephenson built the line using four equally spaced rails; he envisaged that this would allow the line to operate as a double tracked railway line under normal circumstances, but that in the event of a locomotive needing to haul a particularly wide load or of one of the outside rails breaking, a train could run along the central pair of rails. He also felt that, by having the rails this close together, it would reduce the amount of land required for the already extremely expensive L&M scheme.

=== William Huskisson ===
William Huskisson was born at Birtsmorton Court, Malvern, Worcestershire, on 11 March 1770. In 1783, Huskisson went to Paris to live with his great-uncle Dr. Richard Gem, witnessing the early years of the French Revolution, and was present at the Storming of the Bastille. Learning economics from the Marquis de Condorcet, he became an assistant to Earl Gower, who would later become the Marquess of Stafford. In 1792 Britain severed diplomatic relations with the French revolutionary government and Huskisson returned to London.

On Huskisson's return to London Henry Dundas, the Home Secretary, appointed him to oversee the execution of the Aliens Act, which dealt with refugees arriving in Britain from areas affected by the French Revolution. He performed this task well, and in 1795 he was appointed Under-Secretary of State for War at the age of 24. In 1796 he was elected Member of Parliament (MP) for Morpeth. In 1799 he married Eliza Emily Milbanke (known as Emily), daughter of Admiral Mark Milbanke, and shortly afterwards moved to Eartham House near Chichester. He resigned from public office in 1801 following the fall of William Pitt the Younger's government. In 1804 he was re-elected to Parliament for Liskeard, and appointed to the post of Secretary to the Treasury by the returning Pitt. In 1809 Huskisson resigned from the government along with George Canning following Canning's duel with fellow cabinet minister Lord Castlereagh. In 1814 he re-entered government as First Commissioner of Woods and Forests; although this was a relatively minor post, he was very influential in the development of detailed legislation and policy, particularly regarding the controversial relaxation of the Corn Laws.

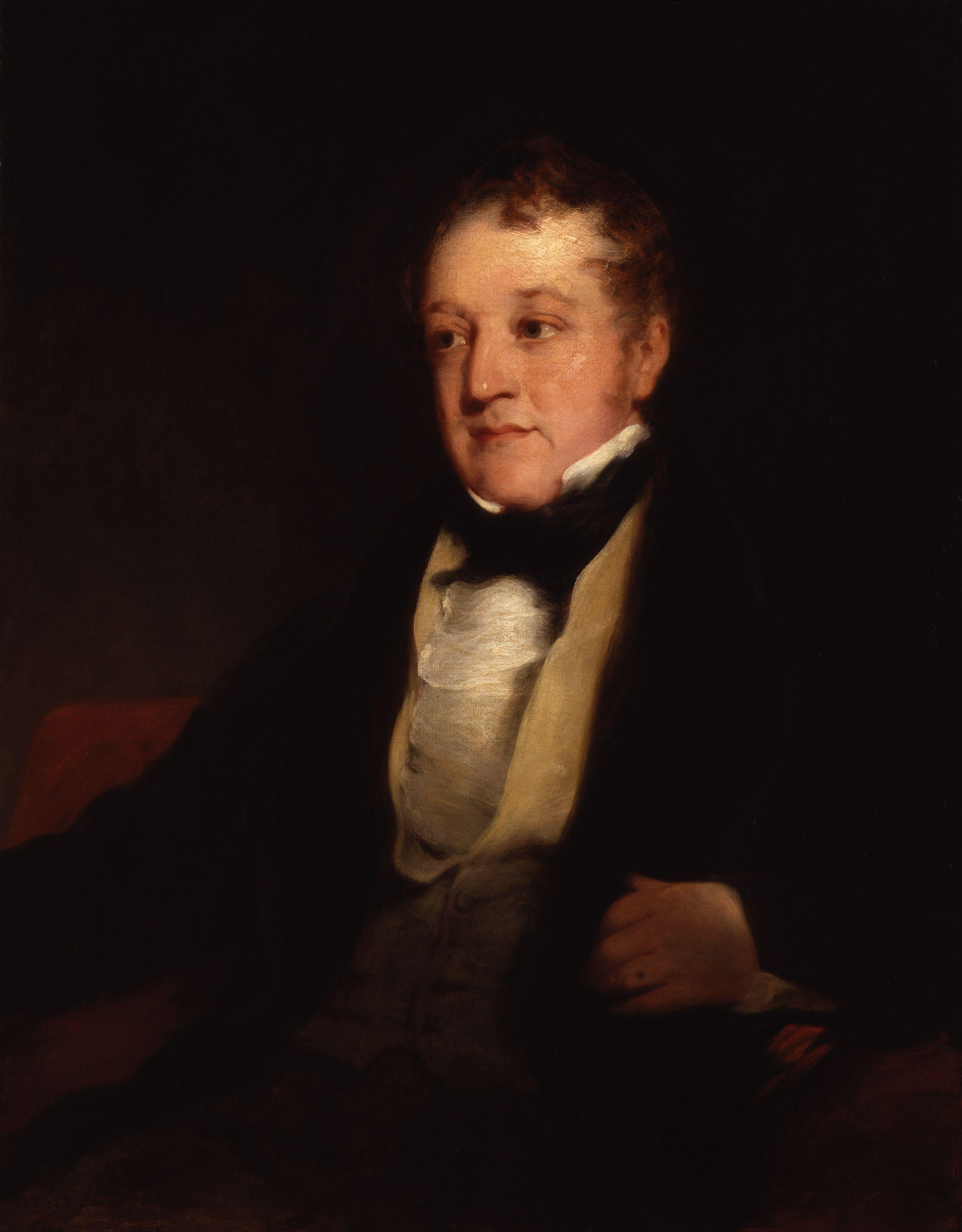
William Huskisson

In 1823 Huskisson was appointed to the Cabinet as President of the Board of Trade and Treasurer of the Navy. In the same year he succeeded George Canning in the important constituency of Liverpool. He oversaw a number of reforms aimed at developing industry and free trade, including reform of the Navigation Acts and reduction of taxes on manufacturing and on the import of foreign goods. He drove through the restructuring of Britain's network of overseas outposts and colonies into the network of economically and politically interdependent states which became the British Empire, aiming for a gradual abolition of slavery and accelerating British colonisation.

In April 1827 Huskisson's mentor George Canning became prime minister, but died less than four months later and was succeeded by Viscount Goderich. Goderich appointed Huskisson Secretary of State for War and the Colonies. Goderich resigned in January 1828 and was replaced as prime minister by Arthur Wellesley, Duke of Wellington. Huskisson, along with many other protégés of Canning, resigned later that year over the issue of the lack of parliamentary representation for Manchester. (Note: Population movements and changing patterns of land ownership had left the parliamentary constituencies of East Retford and Penryn, each of which returned two Members of Parliament, with very small landowning populations, and both had thus become rotten boroughs in which a very low number of eligible voters controlled the outcome of elections. Huskisson proposed that they be abolished and their four seats transferred to the new industrial cities of Manchester and Birmingham, both of which were unrepresented in Parliament at the time. The right wing of the Tory party felt that this redistribution would give undue influence to the industrial cities, and proposed instead that the parliamentary seats be redistributed to areas with large numbers of rural landowners. A compromise was agreed in which the Penryn constituency would be abolished in favour of new constituencies in Manchester but an enlarged and rural East Retford constituency would remain. The House of Lords, fearing Manchester's reputation for political unrest, blocked the compromise. Huskisson refused to support a redistribution which did not benefit the new industrial cities. He voted against the government, and wrote a letter to the Duke of Wellington, saying "I owe it to you ... to lose no time in affording you an opportunity of placing my office in other hands, as the only means in my power of preventing the injury to the King's service which may ensue from the appearance of disunity in his majesty's councils". Huskisson expected that this indication of the dissatisfaction in the cabinet with the House of Lords's veto would induce Wellington to use his influence to push the compromise agreement through, but Wellington interpreted it as a letter of resignation and accepted it as such. Huskisson claimed that his letter had been misunderstood and he had not intended to resign, but Wellington refused to allow him to remain in office. Lord Palmerston, Charles Grant and Lord Dudley, the other remaining members of Canning's faction in the cabinet, resigned later that day in sympathy with Huskisson.) Huskisson remained in Parliament as MP for Liverpool, and devoted himself to working on behalf of the growing industrial towns of north west England; the Manchester Guardian described him as "perhaps the most useful practical statesman of the present day". Although still weak from a previous serious illness, he felt it was his duty as Liverpool's MP to attend the opening of the railway.

=== Rainhill Trials and preparation for opening ===
In late 1829, with construction of the railway almost complete, the Rainhill trials were held on a short level stretch of the completed line near Rainhill, to test how the track withstood locomotives running over it and to determine which type of locomotive would be used, with a £500 prize at stake. The Trials were widely publicised, and 10,000–15,000 people attended the first day on 6 October 1829. Of the five entrants Rocket, built by George Stephenson and his son Robert, (Note: The designer of Rocket is disputed. Robert Stephenson built the locomotive at the Robert Stephenson and Company works in Newcastle upon Tyne, but is quoted as attributing the design to his father and Henry Booth. Some historians dispute this and believe that George Stephenson had no part in the design. It is known that George Stephenson was in Liverpool overseeing the track construction at the time Rocket was designed and built in Newcastle, but he corresponded with Robert regularly and may have sent him the design. The multi-tube boiler, one of the three key innovations in the design of Rocket, (the others being the blast pipe and the angled cylinders providing direct drive to the wheels) was suggested by Henry Booth, secretary of the L&M.) was the only entrant to complete the trial without suffering a serious failure, and was duly selected as the design to be used. (Although often described as a race, and shown as such in illustrations, the Rainhill Trials were a series of independent trials. Each engine ran on a different day.) At around the time of the Rainhill Trials the tunnel to the forthcoming Liverpool terminus—the first tunnel ever dug under a major built-up area—was completed. To win over sceptical locals it was whitewashed, fitted with lighting and a band, and the public charged a shilling apiece to walk through it.

By early 1830 the line was almost complete, and locomotives began trial runs over the route. On 14 June 1830 a test run from Liverpool to Salford drew two passenger carriages and seven fully loaded coal wagons for 29 miles (47 km) in 2 hours 25 minutes without incident. Booth convened a meeting of the directors that evening, who decided that the railway would be ready to open in late summer. After consulting with the office of the Duke of Wellington over when he would be available to attend an inauguration ceremony, and learning that he was due in the area on 13 September to attend a dinner in Manchester, it was agreed that the railway would formally open on Wednesday 15 September 1830.

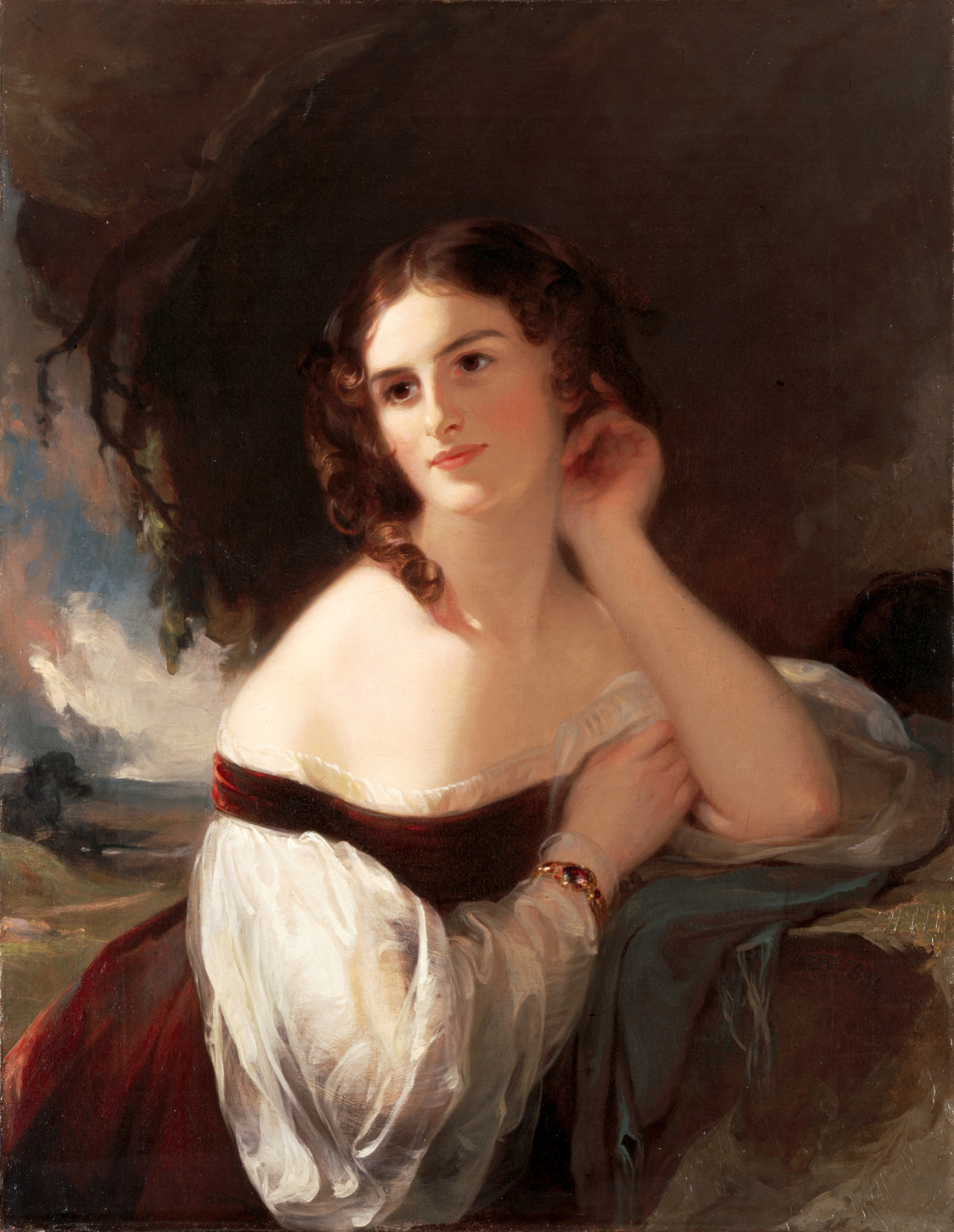
Fanny Kemble, a guest of Stephenson's on a test run of the L&M prior to its opening

Actress, author and anti-slavery campaigner Fanny Kemble, who accompanied George Stephenson on a test of the L&M prior to its opening, described the tests in a letter written in early 1830. She described the steam engine as if it is a horse, with steam valve handles (which controls the steam pressure and thus the speed) being its reins bit and bridle, coals being its oats, etc:

We were introduced to the little engine which was to drag us along the rails. She (for they make these curious little fire horses all mares) consisted of a boiler, a stove, a platform, a bench, and behind the bench a barrel containing enough water to prevent her being thirsty for fifteen miles, the whole machine not bigger than a common fire engine. She goes upon two wheels, which are her feet, and are moved by bright steel legs called pistons; these are propelled by steam, and in proportion as more steam is applied to the upper extremities (the hip-joints, I suppose) of these pistons, the faster they move the wheels; and when it is desirable to diminish the speed, the steam, which unless suffered to escape would burst the boiler, evaporates through a safety valve into the air. The reins, bit, and bridle of this wonderful beast, is a small steel handle, which applies or withdraws the steam from its legs or pistons, so that a child might manage it. The coals, which are its oats, were under the bench, and there was a small glass tube affixed to the boiler, with water in it, which indicates by its fullness or emptiness when the creature wants water, which is immediately conveyed to it from its reservoirs ...

This snorting little animal, which I felt rather inclined to pat, was then harnessed to our carriage, and Mr. Stephenson having taken me on the bench of the engine with him, we started at about ten miles an hour ... [George Stephenson's] way of explaining himself is peculiar, but very striking, and I understood, without difficulty, all that he said to me ... The engine having received its supply of water, the carriage was placed behind it, for it cannot turn, and was set off at its utmost speed, thirty-five miles an hour, swifter than a bird flies (for they tried the experiment with a snipe). You cannot conceive what that sensation of cutting the air was; the motion is as smooth as possible, too. I could either have read or written; and as it was, I stood up, and with my bonnet off 'drank the air before me.' The wind, which was strong, or perhaps the force of our own thrusting against it, absolutely weighed my eyelids down. When I closed my eyes this sensation of flying was quite delightful, and strange beyond description; yet strange as it was, I had a perfect sense of security, and not the slightest fear ...

Now for a word or two about the master of all these marvels, with whom I am most horribly in love. He is a man from fifty to fifty-five years of age; his face is fine, though careworn, and bears an expression of deep thoughtfulness; his mode of explaining his ideas is peculiar and very original, striking, and forcible; and although his accents indicates strongly his north country birth, his language has not the slightest touch of vulgarity or coarseness. He has certainly turned my head. Four years have sufficed to bring this great undertaking to an end. The railroad will be opened upon the fifteenth of next month. The Duke of Wellington is coming down to be present on the occasion, and, I suppose, what with the thousands of spectators and the novelty of the spectacle, there will never have been a scene of more striking interest.

== Opening day ==
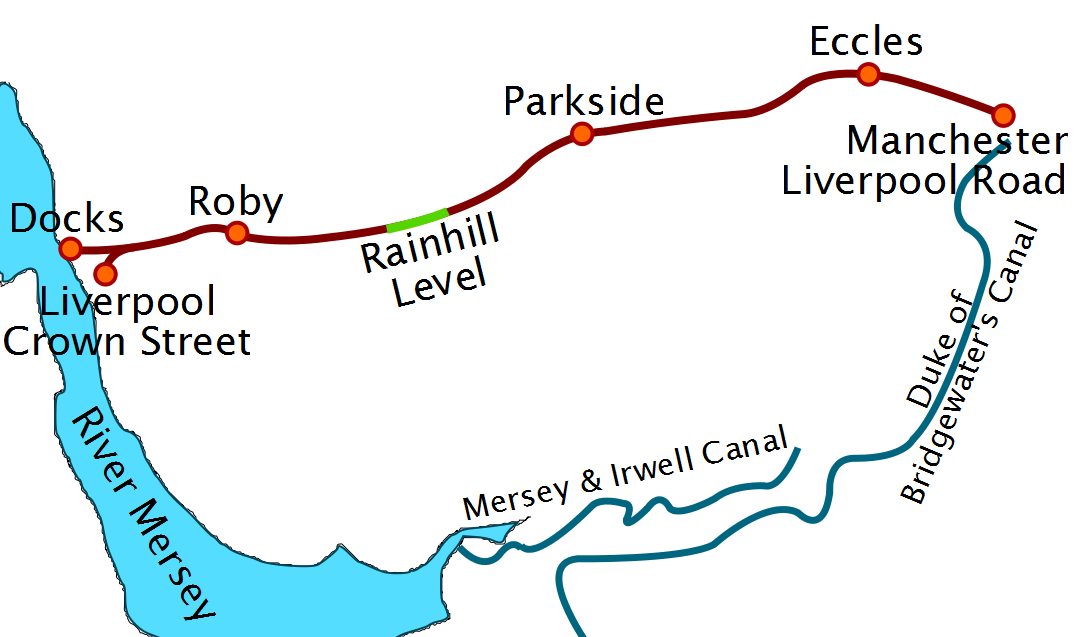
The Liverpool and Manchester Railway, 1830 (Note: Only selected stations are shown.)

The directors of the L&M set out to do all they could to make the opening day a success. It was decided that for the opening, the dignitaries and guests would assemble in Liverpool, and eight of the L&M's locomotives would haul them in special trains to Liverpool Road railway station, the railway's Manchester terminus. A number of covered railway carriages "resembling the most luxurious of road coaches", with cushioned seating and cloth linings and each capable of carrying between 12 and 24 passengers, were provided for the more important persons among those attending. More basic open carriages, described by an observer as "plain homely unadorned butter-and-egg sort of market carts", each carried 60 passengers. Cabinetmaker James Edmondson was commissioned to design a special carriage for the Duke of Wellington and his companions, described by Egerton Smith as:

The floor – 32 feet long by 8 feet wide, supported by eight wheels, partly concealed by a basement, ornamented with bold gold mouldings and laurel wreaths on a ground of crimson cloth. A lofty canopy of crimson cloth, 24 feet in length, rested upon eight carved and gilt pillars, the cornice enriched with gold ornaments and pendant tassels, the cloth fluted to two centres, surmounted with two ducal coronets. An ornamental gilt balustrade extended round each end of the carriage, and united with one of the pillars which supported the roof. Handsome scrolls filled up the next compartments, on each side of the doorway, which was in the centre.

This special train was divided into four carriages. Behind the locomotive was a wagon carrying a band, and behind it were three passenger carriages, with the Duke's special carriage in the centre. It was drawn by Northumbrian, Stephenson's most advanced locomotive at the time with a 14 horsepower (10 kW) engine. The Duke's train was to run on the southern of the L&M's two tracks, and the other seven trains would run on the northern track, to ensure the Duke would not be delayed should any of the other trains encounter problems. (Note: Northumbrian ran alone on the southern track, with the Duke of Wellington's train. The trains on the northern track, in order, were Phoenix with five carriages, North Star with five carriages, Rocket with three carriages, Dart with four carriages, Comet with four carriages, Arrow with four carriages, and Meteor with four carriages. Each train was associated with a colour flag matching guest tickets and were driven by George Stephenson (lilac), Robert Stephenson Jr. (green), Robert Stephenson Sr.(yellow), Joseph Locke (light blue), Thomas L. Gooch (purple), William Allcard (deep red), Frederick Swanwick (pink), and Antony Harding (brown) respectively.)

The gathering of the dignitaries at the station and the departure of the trains was a major event. Every hotel room and lodging-house in Liverpool was full the night before. From 9:00 am onwards the area around the station was filled with people, and crowds thronged the trackside at Liverpool to watch the trains depart. One group of men had each paid two shillings for access to the best vantage point, the top of a chimney near the tunnel leading to Crown Street railway station; they were hoisted up by rope and board shortly after dawn to watch proceedings.

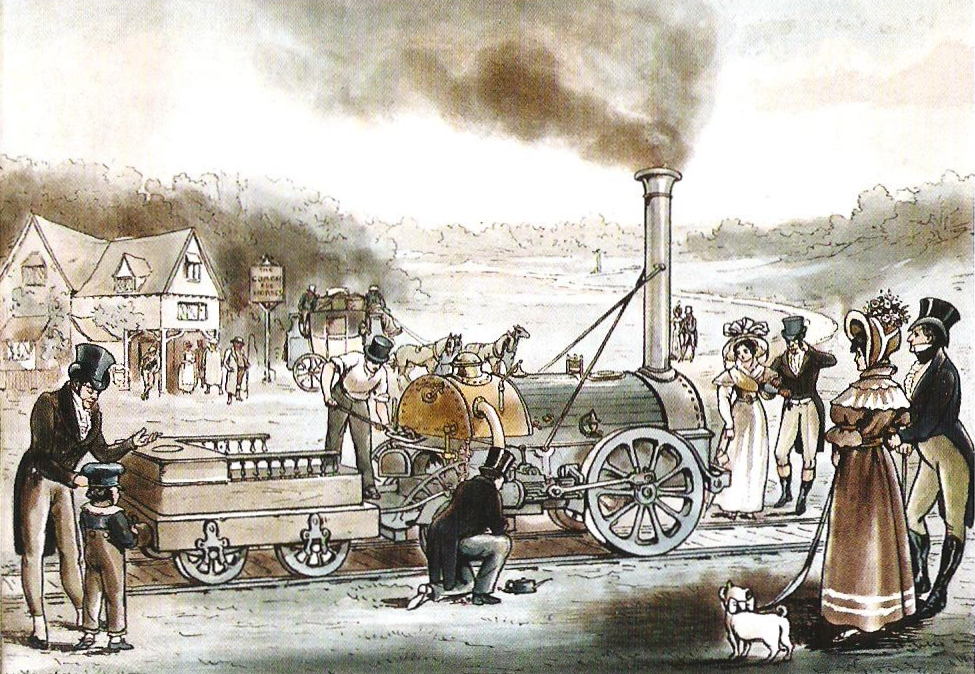
Northumbrian

Shortly before 10:00 am as the Duke of Wellington arrived, a band played See, the Conquering Hero Comes in his honour, beginning a tradition of the song being played at almost every British railway station opening from then on. The Duke's party entered their carriage; a gun was then fired to mark the opening of the railway. The Duke's carriages had their brakes released and were allowed to roll down the incline under the force of gravity to be coupled to the waiting Northumbrian.

Soldiers cleared the tracks of onlookers, and the procession of trains left Crown Street station in Liverpool at 11:00 am, William and Emily Huskisson travelled in the Ducal train, in the passenger carriage immediately in front of the Duke's carriage. Northumbrian slowed periodically to allow the seven trains on the northern track to parade past it, but generally ran ahead of the other trains.

=== Phoenix collision ===
Near Parr, about 13 miles (21 km) out of Liverpool, the world's first passenger train-on-train collision took place, as described by "A Railer" in Blackwood's Edinburgh Magazine, who was travelling in the lead train on the northern track, hauled by Phoenix:

One of our engine wheels, how I know not, contrived to bolt from the course—in plain words, it escaped from the rail, and ploughed along upon the clay, with no other inconvenience than an increase of friction, which damped our speed, and with the additional application of the break, soon brought us to an anchor. The engine, however, behind us, not being aware of our mishap, came pelting on at a smart pace, without receiving its signal for checking motion in time. Accordingly, those on the look-out hastily called on their fellow-passengers to be on their guard, and prepare for a jolt, which took place with a crash upon our rear, sufficiently loud and forcible to give an idea of what would happen, if by any strange chance it had charged us with the unrestrained impetuosity of its powers.

With no reported injuries from this incident, the wheels of the derailed Phoenix were remounted on the rails and the journey continued. After crossing the Sankey Viaduct, the trains passed Warrington Junction, where George Stephenson's Warrington and Newton Railway was under construction in the expectation of eventual extension southwards to link the L&M to Birmingham and London. After passing Warrington Junction, the parade of trains passed through the historic market town of Newton-le-Willows, roughly at the midpoint of the line. Fifty-five minutes after leaving Liverpool the procession was scheduled to stop for the locomotives to take on water at Parkside railway station, half a mile east of Newton-le-Willows and 17 miles (27 km) from Liverpool.

== Parkside ==
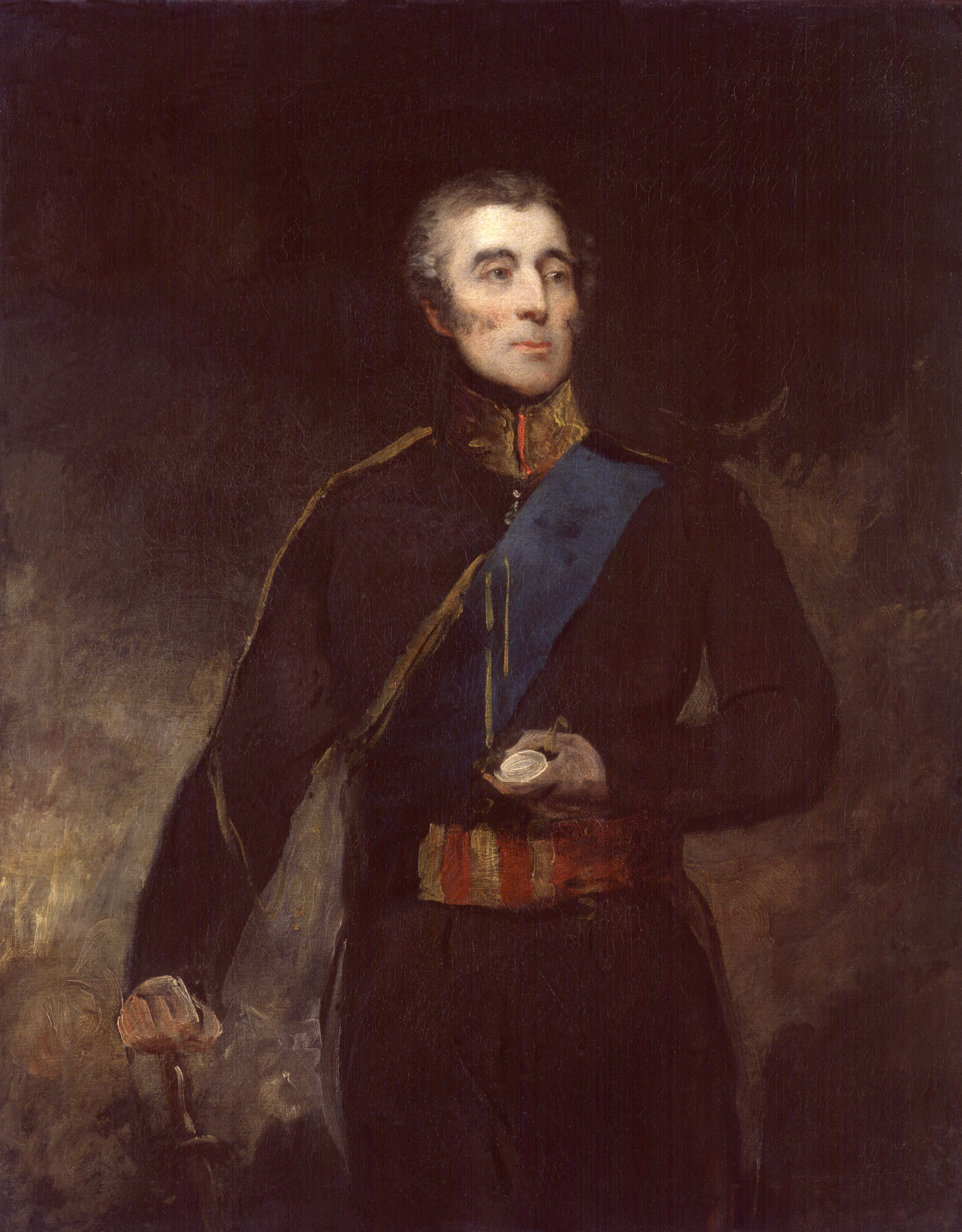
The Duke of Wellington in 1830

Although in an isolated rural area, Parkside station had been designed as a junction station and water stop for proposed connections with the Wigan Branch Railway and the Bolton and Leigh Railway, and had multiple lines of rails in place. A leaflet given to those travelling on the trains advised that while:

the apparatus at which the water is supplied is worth looking at ... we recommend the inspection to take place from the carriages. There are here five lines of rails, and the excitation arising from the approach of a carriage will generally so confuse a person not accustomed to walk on the railroad, as to make it almost impossible for him to discern which line it is coming on.

The Duke's train had run more slowly through populated areas owing to the cheering crowds, and by the time it reached Parkside the first two trains on the northern track, hauled by Phoenix and North Star, had already passed through Parkside and had pulled up ahead of the station waiting for the Duke's train to depart. (Note: The Duke of Wellington described being overtaken by Phoenix and North Star as "like the whizzing of a cannon ball".) By now, the passengers in the Duke's train had been travelling for almost an hour, and the water stop at Parkside was the only scheduled stop on the journey. Although it was beginning to drizzle, and despite a request from the railway engineers for passengers to remain on the trains, at 11:55 am around 50 men disembarked from the Duke's train to stretch their legs. (Note: Although many women travelled on the inaugural trains, no women disembarked from the Duke's train at Parkside prior to the accident.) The group consisted of many of the most influential figures of the day, including the Marquess of Stafford, Charles Arbuthnot, Prince Esterházy, the Earl of Wilton, L&M founder Joseph Sandars and William Huskisson. As the rain had formed deep puddles on either side of the railway embankment, most of the party remained on or near the railway tracks.

The group stood around the rail lines and discussed the events of the day and the potential of rail travel. According to Sandars, Huskisson congratulated him on the achievement of his vision, and said to Sandars that he "must be one of the happiest men in the world". William Holmes, the Chief Whip, then called Huskisson to one side. He suggested that, with the Duke of Wellington in a particularly good mood owing to the cheering crowds which had lined the route, it might be a good time for Huskisson and the Duke to meet and try to arrange a reconciliation.

The Duke of Wellington was becoming unpopular as prime minister, particularly in the industrial north west of England, for continually blocking proposed reforms. Huskisson saw himself as well placed to unite the two wings of the Tory party should the Duke retire, or to lead the reforming faction of the party into a split from the Tories and a progressive alliance with the Whigs. He also saw himself as a natural ally for the Duke, despite their political differences, as a Tory popular in Liverpool and Manchester, both of which were traditionally hostile to the party. Newspapers were already beginning to report rumours that Huskisson and his supporters were to be invited back into the government.

Huskisson saw the Duke of Wellington sitting in the front corner of his special carriage. Huskisson walked along the tracks to the carriage, extended a hand, and the Duke reached out of the carriage and shook it.

=== Rocket collision ===
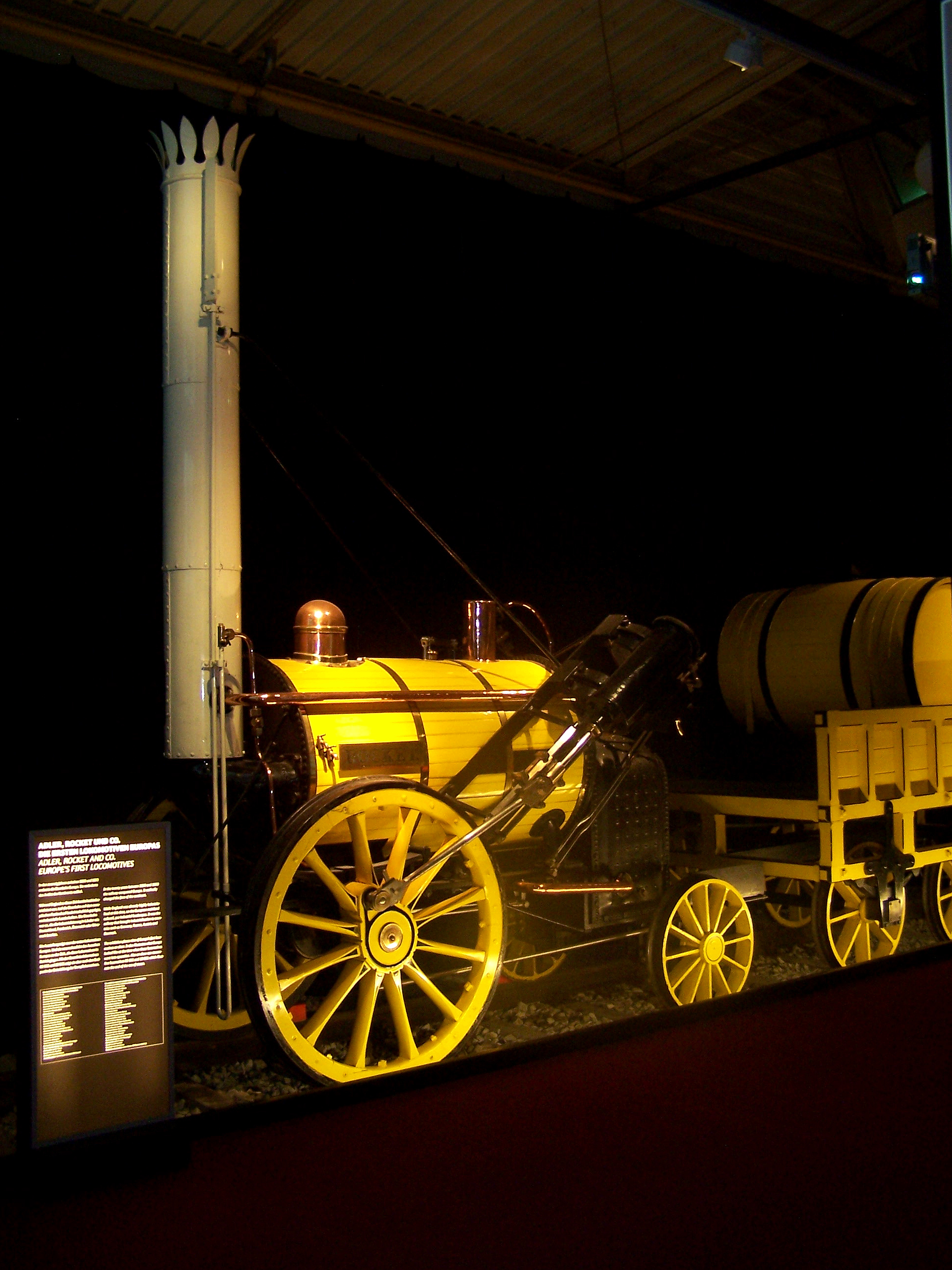
A replica of Rocket as it appeared at the time of the L&M's opening

As Huskisson and the Duke of Wellington exchanged greetings, some of the crowd saw Rocket, hauling the third of the seven trains on the northern track, approaching in the distance. They shouted "An engine is approaching, take care gentlemen" to those people—including Huskisson—standing on the tracks.

The men gathered on the track moved out of the way of the approaching Rocket, either by climbing onto the embankment or getting back into their carriages. Unlike the other carriages, Edmondson had not equipped the Duke's carriage with fixed steps. Instead, a movable set of steps was at the back of the carriage, to be moved into position to allow travellers to board and alight at whichever part of the carriage was most convenient. With Rocket approaching, there was not time to fetch the movable steps. With Rocket 80 feet (24 m) away, only Holmes, Huskisson and Esterházy remained on the tracks. Edward Littleton MP, a passenger in the Duke's carriage, reached out to Esterházy and hauled him into the carriage to safety.

Joseph Locke, driving Rocket, now saw that there were people on the line ahead. Rocket was an engineering prototype, and had not been equipped with brakes. Locke threw the engine into reverse gear, a process which took ten seconds to engage. As Rocket continued to approach, Huskisson and Holmes panicked. Holmes clung to the side of the Duke's carriage, while Huskisson made two efforts to run across the track to safety, each time returning to the side of the carriage.

The space between the rails was 4 ft 8 1/2 in (1,435 mm), and the carriages overhung the outside rails by 2 feet (610 mm). Pressed against the side of the carriage, the remaining gap was just enough for Huskisson and Holmes to escape without injury, but Huskisson misjudged the distance. According to Edward Littleton, the Duke of Wellington said to Huskisson "We seem to be going on—you had better step in!" Huskisson tried to clamber into the carriage, but those inside failed to reach him to pull him in. Holmes, still pressed against the carriage, shouted "For God's sake, Mr Huskisson, be firm", but Huskisson grabbed the door of the carriage. With Holmes still pressed against the side of the carriage, the door, with Huskisson hanging on to it, swung out directly into the path of Rocket. Rocket collided with the door and Huskisson fell onto the track in front of the locomotive.

In the words of Harriet Arbuthnot, who was in the Duke's carriage, '[Huskisson] was caught by it, thrown down & the engine passed over his leg & thigh, crushing it in a most frightful way. It is impossible to give an idea of the scene that followed, of the horror of everyone present or of the piercing shrieks of his unfortunate wife, who was in the car. He said scarcely more than, "It's all over with me. Bring me my wife and let me die."'

=== Initial reaction ===
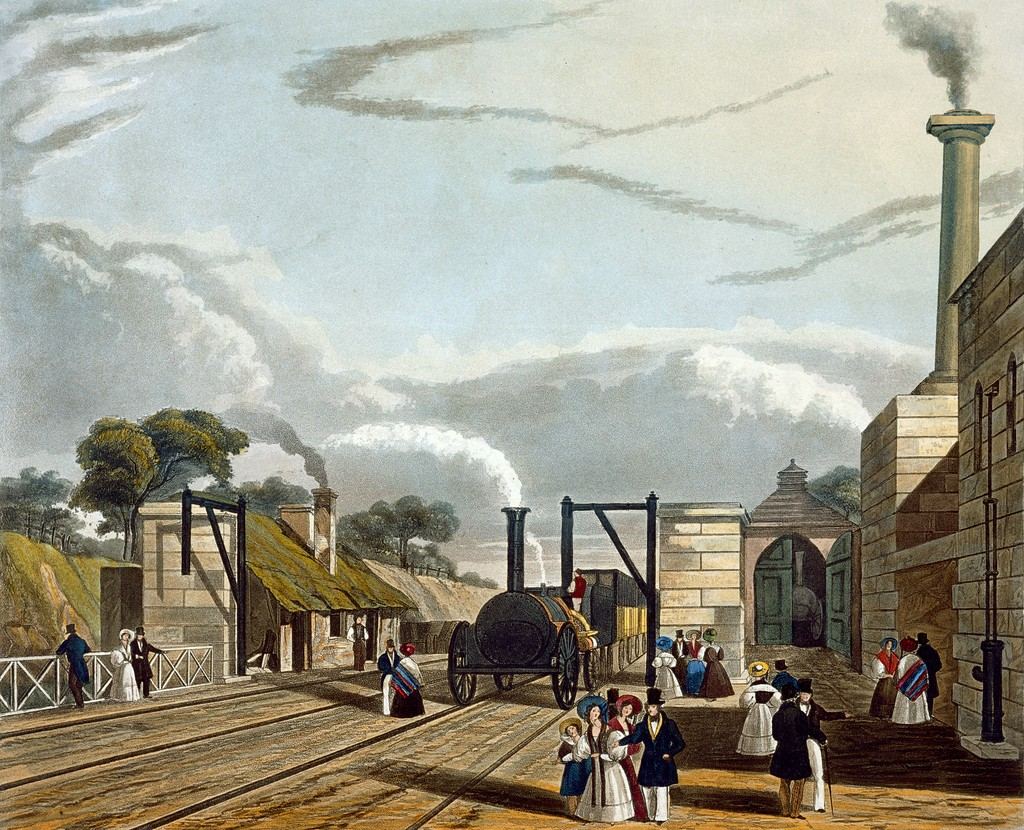
1831 colour engraving of Parkside station

Joseph Parkes, Lord Wilton and William Rathbone were the first to reach Huskisson. They found that a wheel had passed over his right calf and thigh, leaving his knee itself untouched. A flap of skin on his upper leg had been cut back, exposing the muscles, and the exposed arteries had not been severed but were flattened, pulsing with Huskisson's heartbeat. The damaged leg shook uncontrollably. Observers noted that Huskisson did not appear to be in pain, and instead lay watching the leg shake. Huskisson shouted "This is the death of me". Parkes attempted to reassure him, but Huskisson replied "Yes, I am dying, call Mrs Huskisson". A man threw his coat over William Huskisson's leg to spare Emily Huskisson from seeing the extent of his injuries, and she was helped from the carriage in which she had been sitting. In hysterics, she attempted to throw herself onto Huskisson, but was restrained by fellow passengers as Lord Wilton applied a makeshift tourniquet he had made using handkerchiefs and an elderly passenger's walking stick. Other passengers ripped the door of a nearby railway storeroom from its hinges, to serve as a makeshift stretcher. Huskisson was lifted onto the door, shaking his head and saying "Where is Mrs Huskisson? I have met my death, God forgive me." (Garfield, writing in 2002, gives his words as "This is my death, God forgive me".)

Men ran along the track in both directions to tell the other trains not to proceed. In the initial panic, the first thought of many of those present was that the Prime Minister had been assassinated.

On looking out, I observed the Duke's train drawn up parallel to another train, with a considerable number of persons on foot assembled in the intervening space; and, at the same time, I perceived an appearance of hustling, and stooping, and crowding together for which I could not well account. In another moment, a gentleman rushed forth, and came running up the line towards us; as he neared, I saw evidently that he was much agitated, and pale, and breathless—in short, that something dreadful had happened was obvious. At length he stopped, and fifty voices exclaimed, "Has any thing happened? What is the matter?" In a state of distracted nervousness, and in broken unconnected words, he at last broke silence—"Oh God! he is dead! He is killed! he is killed!"—"Who, and when, and how?" burst from every mouth; the first passing thought on my own, and probably every other mind, being, that some desperate and successful attempt had been made on the Duke's life. The truth, however, soon spread like wildfire to the right and left, acting, as it fell upon every car, like a spell. Smiles and cheerful countenances were changed for one general gloom. Amongst those who were near the fatal spot, the first feeling was one of thankfulness, that their own immediate relative was not the victim; the next, and most permanent, was sympathy with the unhappy lady who saw her husband stretched, lacerated and bleeding, on the ground. A further sympathy was, I am sure, as generally and as sincerely felt—a sympathy with those gentlemen, who, as directors, had for so long devoted themselves to the accommodation of the public, and looked forward to this day as a gratifying and auspicious termination of their labours; conscious, too, as they were, that had their printed directions, issued with the tickets, been adhered to, no such accident could by any possibility have occurred.

— "A Railer", Blackwood's Edinburgh Magazine

Henry Herbert Southey, physician to the recently deceased George IV, had travelled in the Duke's train, as had Dr Hunter, professor of anatomy at the University of Edinburgh. The two of them rushed to Huskisson's side, joined shortly afterwards by Joseph Brandreth, a Liverpool surgeon who had been travelling behind Phoenix. (Note: Joseph Brandreth's brother Thomas Shaw Brandreth had designed Cycloped, an unsuccessful competitor in the Rainhill Trials powered by horses on treadmills instead of steam power.) The doctors suggested returning Huskisson to Liverpool for treatment, but George Stephenson insisted that it would be better to take him on to Manchester.

Open carriages on the Liverpool and Manchester Railway in 1830.

Huskisson was loaded onto the flat-bottomed wagon of the Duke's train which had carried the band. The remaining three carriages of the Duke's train were detached and the band's carriage, hauled by Northumbrian, set off for Manchester with Stephenson driving. Lord Wilton held Huskisson's hands and arms steady, while Lord Colville supported his head on his knees and tried to cushion him from the vibration of the train. With the train almost unladen and Stephenson running the engine flat-out, the train reached the speed of almost 40 miles per hour (64 km/h), briefly giving those on board the world speed record. The crowds lining the route, unaware of what had happened, cheered and waved as Northumbrian rushed past.

Believing Huskisson to be near death, Brandreth suggested that the party stop at the first house they came to. After some discussion the doctors decided to stop at the vicarage of the Rev. Thomas Blackburne, vicar of Eccles, four miles (6.4 km) short of Manchester. When told of the decision, Huskisson concurred, saying "Pray do so, I am sure my friend Blackburne will be kind to me", unaware that Blackburne had been invited to the inauguration of the railway and was now waiting with the rest of the passengers at Parkside.

== Eccles ==
By the time the train reached Eccles, the day's drizzle had been replaced by a storm. The doctors carried Huskisson, still on his door, off the train into a torrent of hail and thunder and walked the few hundred yards to the vicarage, frequently losing their footing as they climbed the deep cutting. Meanwhile, Stephenson and Wilton restarted the train and went on to Manchester to fetch medical assistance.

The party arrived at the vicarage to be greeted by Mrs Blackburne. (Mrs Blackburne had originally intended to travel on the inaugural journey with her husband, but the previous day had felt a presentiment that something was wrong at home and her presence was required, and had returned alone by boat. She had then heard a rumour that a mob from Oldham were planning to storm the track at Eccles to attack the Duke of Wellington, and decided to remain in the vicarage.) Huskisson was moved to the sofa, and given laudanum and brandy. At about 2:00 pm Hunter and Brandreth cut Huskisson's clothing away from his damaged leg to give it a proper examination. Unfamiliar with industrial injuries, they were baffled by the nature of the damage to Huskisson's leg, but concluded that despite the apparent severity of his injuries the wounds were treatable.

The leg presented a frightful appearance, but in the wound nothing that would prevent the operation or any reason to doubt its success if he had, had constitutional strength to support the additional shock. It is a perfect mystery how the wound was produced, judging from the representations of those who witnessed the accident, and in those statements there is very little differences. The leg half way between the knee and ankle was almost entirely severed, except a small portion on the outside, but the boot was scarcely marked at all. Half-way but rather higher up between the knee and body, the whole flesh was torn off above the bones broken, but the artery which lies over and above it was not injured; which accounts for the small quantities of blood lost. The flesh on the outward and lower side was not injured much. It was scarcely possible to understand how this could take place if the wheel had gone over him, or how only one wheel, and that the first of the engines, could have done so, without the whole train following, or why it did not, from the enormous weight, entirely sever it.

— Personal letter from Joseph Brandreth describing the incident, quoted in the Liverpool Mercury

The doctors decided that Huskisson was likely to survive but his injured leg was likely to need amputation. With no medicines or surgical tools, they waited for the arrival of the surgical equipment and medical specialists Stephenson had gone to summon from Manchester.

Countenance pale and ghastly, forehead covered with cold perspiration, cold and stiffened extremities, and sickness and oppression at the stomach, with frequent convulsive shudders, difficult respiration, and great constitutional alarm.

— Whatton's initial notes on Huskisson's condition

A coach from Manchester eventually arrived bearing four surgeons, led by William Robert Whatton. By this time Huskisson was suffering severe spasms, and those present were having to hold his arms and legs down to stop him falling off the sofa. Whatton assessed that Huskisson was suffering from severe haemorrhaging from the initial wound and subsequent blood loss, and that amputation was necessary to prevent a fatal loss of blood. However, in Huskisson's agitated condition Whatton felt that traumatic surgery would likely prove fatal. Whatton and his colleagues applied warm water to Huskisson's chest, feet and hands, and gave him warm cordials and further laudanum in an effort to calm him enough to withstand the shock of surgery. At around 3:00 pm the party heard the sound of cannon fire from the west. Told that the cannons were probably being fired to mark the arrival of the Prime Minister in Manchester, Huskisson said "I hope to God the Duke may get safe through the day". At around 4:00 pm Huskisson had regained enough strength to dictate to William Wainewright, his secretary, a brief amendment to his will ensuring that Emily Huskisson would inherit all his property, and shakily signed it. He then requested the sacrament, which was performed by the Rev Blackburne, and read the Lord's Prayer with Wilton. When Huskisson came to the line "and forgive us our trespasses, as we forgive them that trespass against us", he said "That I do most heartily; and I declare to God that I have not the slightest feeling of ill-will towards any human being."

== Continuation to Manchester ==
Meanwhile, back at Parkside the other seven trains had come to a halt following the accident. The electrical telegraph had not yet been invented and no signalling system was in place advanced enough to communicate with Northumbrian, with Liverpool and Manchester, or with the party who had accompanied Huskisson to Eccles. The remaining passengers and railway staff congregated near the accident site to discuss how best to proceed. The L&M staff argued that since the railway was not at fault for the accident they should be allowed to continue to Manchester to prove the viability of the design. They also made the point that a large crowd would by now have gathered in Manchester, waiting to see the arrival of the trains and to get a glimpse of the Duke of Wellington. Joseph Sandars also suggested that, did the group not continue, the Manchester crowd would hear rumours of the accident and believe it to be more serious than it was. The Prime Minister and Sir Robert Peel, the Home Secretary, felt that it would be disrespectful to Huskisson to continue, and advocated that the group return to Liverpool to await news of Huskisson's condition.

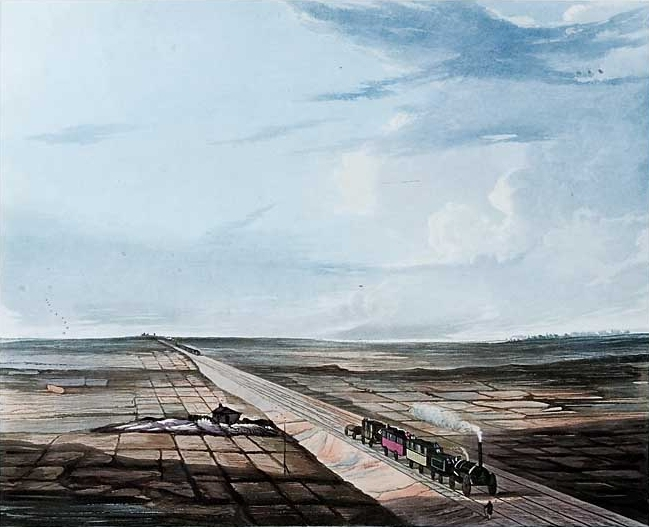
The Liverpool and Manchester Railway at Chat Moss, 1833

At about the time Whatton's party of surgeons arrived at Eccles, riders on horseback arrived at Parkside from Manchester and Salford. They reported that the crowd in Manchester was becoming restless, and that the authorities feared a riot if the Duke did not arrive. The Duke's party returned to Edmondson's elaborate ducal carriage, still on the southern track. Northumbrian had gone ahead with Huskisson and the other seven locomotives were all on the northern track, and there was no way to move what remained of the Duke's train onto the northern track or transfer a locomotive to the southern. A long chain was tied between Phoenix on the northern track, and the three remaining carriages of the Duke's train on the southern track. At 1:30 pm Phoenix and its train were then attached to North Star and its train and the two locomotives set out at low speed towards Manchester, passing Eccles and heading into the deserted marshland of Chat Moss.

During the long interval spent in a state of uncertainty, individual feelings were vented in a variety of ways. Some were in tears, some retired from the crowd and paced hastily up and down the road, some seated themselves by the side in silence. Some stood absorbed, while others discussed the accident in little knots and parties—some were gesticulating, while others were looking on speechless and motionless. The final decision being in favour of advancing, seats were resumed, and we moved on; but the buoyant exhilaration of the morning was past, and the whole now wore the sombre aspect of a funeral procession. The military band was left to return as it could; I saw them, crest-fallen, picking their way homeward through the mud and mire; our trumpeters, who had hitherto rather overpowered us with their efforts, were ordered to keep silence, and no responsive greetings met the shouts of spectators, as yet in ignorance of the sad event. The weather, too, began to assume a cheerless aspect, and the lively face of a well-cultivated country was soon exchanged for the dreary wilds of Chatmoss, that Paradise of Will o' the Wisps, snipes, and blue devils ... A heavy shower, with distant thunder, tended little to raise our spirits in crossing this irreclaimable wilderness of nearly six miles in extent, continuing with more or less intermission till the end of our journey.

— "A Railer", Blackwood's Edinburgh Magazine

=== Arrival in Manchester ===
As Wellington's makeshift train slowly headed towards Manchester, it was accompanied along the route by cheering crowds, still unaware of the accident. As they passed the milepost marking 25 miles (40 km) from Liverpool, in the middle of Chat Moss, they met Stephenson and Northumbrian on the southern track, returning from Manchester. Stephenson told the party of Huskisson's condition when he last saw him before leaving Eccles for Manchester (erroneously claiming that amputation had already been attempted successfully), and boasted of having set a new speed record. The three remaining carriages of Wellington's original train, still on the southern track, were detached from the train and attached to Northumbrian, which set off at full speed for Manchester. As the train approached Manchester the trackside bystanders became increasingly hostile, booing, hissing and waving banners against Wellington. Hostile crowds spilled onto the track, forcing the trains to slow to a crawl. Eventually the crowds on the track became so dense they were unable to disperse as the trains approached, and the trains were obliged "to play the part of the juggernaut car", pushing people out of their path with their own momentum.

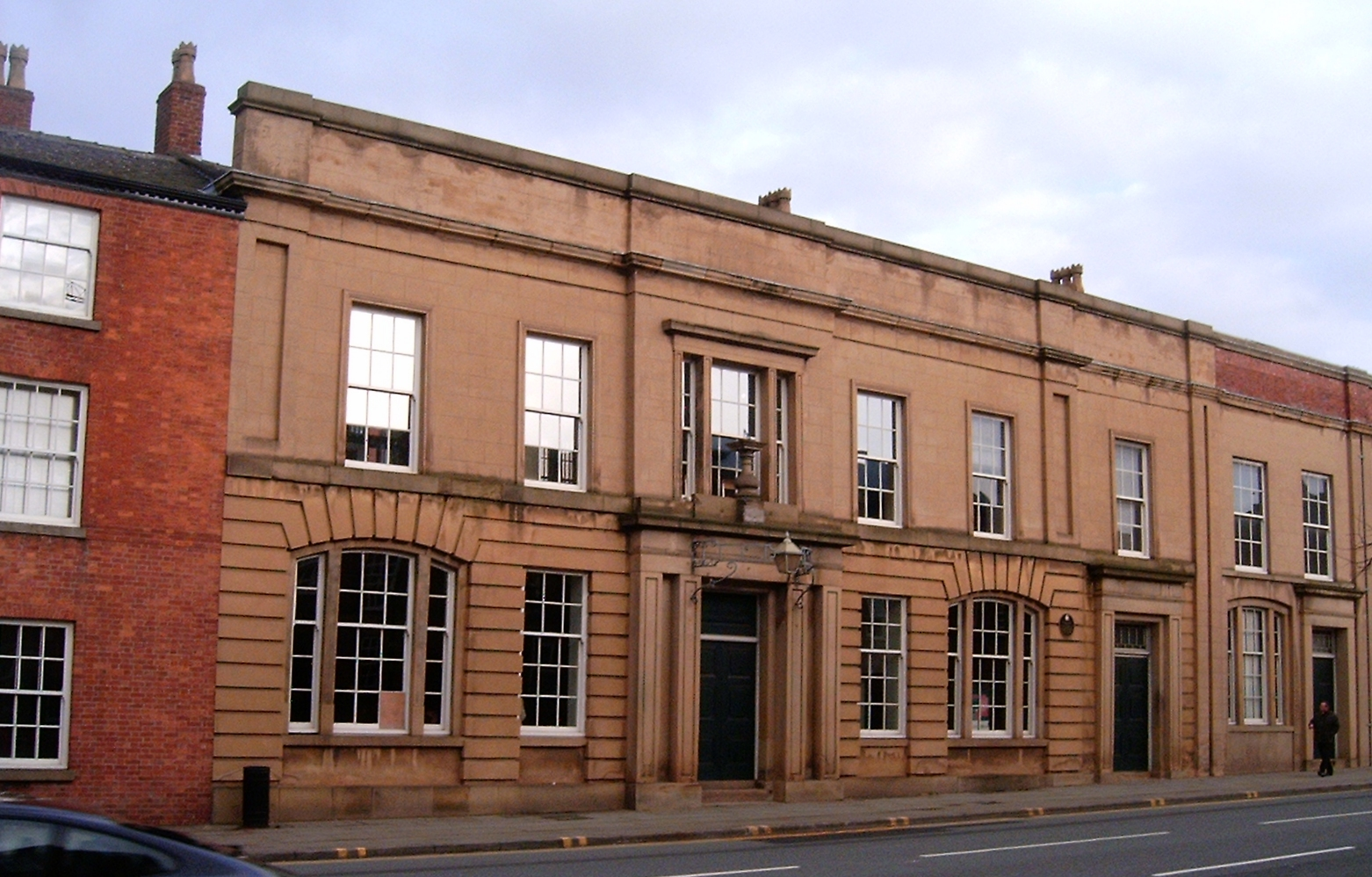
Liverpool Road railway station

The Duke of Wellington arrived at Liverpool Road, the L&M's Manchester terminus, a little before 3:00 pm. As the messengers sent to Parkside had warned, the crowd had become hostile; one observer described them as "A slovenly, ragged set, with hair uncombed and beards unshaven, with waistcoats open, exhibiting unwashed skin, dirty linen, and bare necks." While some present cheered, others—especially weavers—hissed the Duke and pelted his carriage with vegetables. Two tricolore flags were hoisted, and banners reading "No Corn Laws" and "Vote by Ballot" were waved. The passengers on the trains disembarked and headed to a buffet of cold meats in the L&M's warehouse. On disembarking from the train the Rev Thomas Blackburne learned for the first time that Huskisson was in his vicarage, and rushed home to Eccles by horse. Fearing the hostile crowd, Wellington refused to leave his carriage, sent for food to be brought in to him, and ordered that the locomotives be readied for return to Liverpool as soon as possible. At 4:37 pm the trains began to pull out of Manchester to head back to Liverpool.

=== Return to Liverpool ===
The hasty departure from Manchester degenerated into chaos. Mechanical failures and a lack of space to turn the locomotives meant that the seven trains on the northern track were unable to get out of the station. Only three carriages—the Duke's among them—managed to leave successfully. At around 6:30 pm the Duke arrived in Roby, and went to spend the night at the Marquess of Salisbury's house at Childwall Hall. Meanwhile, the remaining 24 passenger carriages were eventually lashed together with rope and fastened to the three locomotives which remained usable, which hauled this single long train, carrying around 600 passengers, out of Manchester at a speed of around 5 mph (8 km/h), further slowed by crowds of people standing on the tracks and by grit and mud settling on the rails.

The eight trains had been scheduled to arrive back in Liverpool at 4:00 pm. By 7:00 pm, the passenger train was not yet even halfway back to Liverpool. As darkness fell it began to rain, and the drivers, fearing for the safety of the trains in the dark and wet, slowed the train further. As it had not been intended that the inaugural journey take place in the darkness the trains were not fitted with lighting or engine lamps; the driver of Comet, leading the train, held a burning tarry rope to light the way ahead. Although some of the crowds lining the route were now dispersing, many others had remained to see the trains return. These crowds had been drinking all day; as the train passed under bridges the train, with its open carriages, was pelted with objects thrown down from the bridges, and on one occasion Comet struck a wheelbarrow, apparently deliberately placed across the rails. Passing Eccles, the train stopped briefly for enquiries to be made about Huskisson; those enquiring were told that he was looking frail, and a successful operation was unlikely in his current condition.

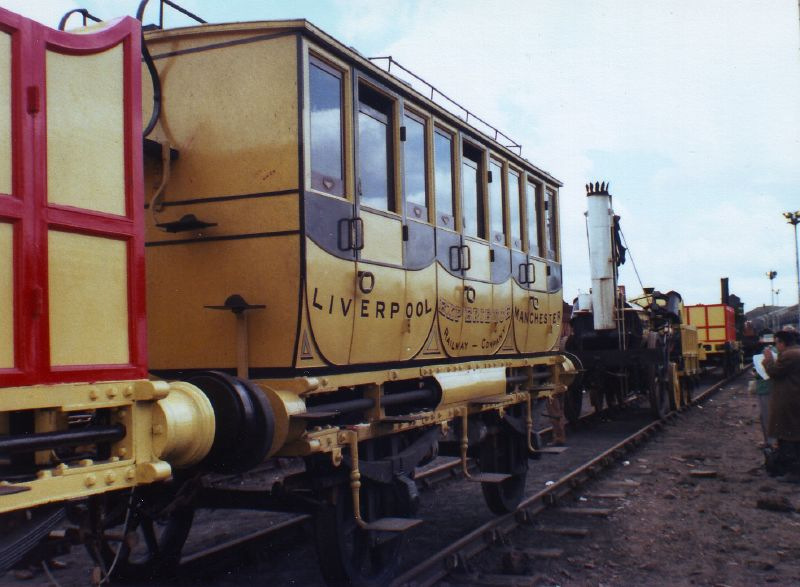
A replica of Rocket and one of the passenger coaches used on the opening day of the L&M

Shortly after passing the accident site at Parkside, the train passed a group of uniformed men walking along the railway carrying a variety of objects. It later transpired that this was the band, who had left their wagon when it had been commandeered to carry the injured Huskisson. The train which had carried the Duke of Wellington to Roby had not had space for them, and had left them to wait for the other trains which they believed were following. The band had eventually given up waiting and walked home, along a grass verge that was turning to mud under the heavy rain. As the train passed Sutton the three engines were unable to haul the combined weight of the train up an incline, and 400 of the men aboard were obliged to get out of the train and walk for a mile, illuminated only by the sparks flying from the locomotives, as the engines slowly hauled the empty carriages up the gradient. The train finally arrived in Liverpool at 10:30 pm. Many of the guests had planned to return home in daylight following the completion of the journey, and set out into the pitch-black city in search of somewhere to sleep.

The group who had watched the departure of the trains from the top of the chimney near the Liverpool tunnel, meanwhile, had been forgotten in the confusion, and were unable to get down from their vantage point. Eventually at around 8:00 pm John Harrison, a teacher of gymnastics and swordsmanship, lowered himself down the rope hand-over-hand, and coaxed the others to follow him down in the same manner. The angry group then set out in search of the worker who had been supposed to bring them down.

James Radley, owner of Liverpool's landmark Adelphi Hotel, had laid on a banquet for 7:00 pm to celebrate "the success and promotion of steam power". He had prepared food for 230, and sold 60 advance tickets. By 9:00 pm, with most of the passengers still on the train back from Manchester including Liverpool trade magnate William Brown who was to chair the meeting, only 20 people had turned up. Businessman and politician John Ashton Yates was drafted in to replace Brown, and the 20 diners began a subdued two-hour meal, frequently interrupted by riders bringing the latest news from Eccles. During the main course messages were brought that an operation had been performed successfully and that Huskisson was recovering; by dessert another messenger brought the message that no operation had been performed after all, and that Huskisson was worsening. By the time the meal concluded at around 11:00 pm, no reliable news of Huskisson's condition had arrived. Following a toast to the King and to Huskisson's recovery, steamship pioneer Francis B. Ogden, at the time the American Consul in Liverpool, gave a speech about the planned Baltimore and Ohio Railroad and of forthcoming schemes to connect New Orleans with the Great Lakes by rail. Although they did not know it, by this time Huskisson was already dead.

== Death of William Huskisson ==
As the evening progressed Huskisson continued to weaken. The doctors had concluded that without amputation he would continue to deteriorate, but that he had no realistic chance of surviving major surgery, and broke this news to the Huskissons. William Huskisson already believed that he was dying and had resigned himself to his fate; Emily Huskisson at first caused "a dreadful scene ... but at last she calmed herself and during the rest of the time sat weeping by the couch". Huskisson told Brandreth "You see I shall never live to make any return for your kindness. You have done all that is possible, but it is all in vain." After further laudanum, he complained "Why endeavour to support my strength? I must die, it is only prolonging my sufferings."

At about 11:00 pm that night William Wainewright sat down in Blackburne's study at Eccles vicarage to write a brief letter to the Mayor of Liverpool.

Sir,

With the deepest grief, I have to acquaint you, for the information of yourself, and of the community over which you preside, that Mr Huskisson breathed his last at 9 o'clock this evening. He was attended from the moment of the accident, with indefatigable assiduity, by Dr Brandreth of Liverpool, Dr Hunter of Edinburgh, and Mr Ransome, Mr Whatton, Mr Garside and Mr White, of Manchester.

His last moments were soothed by the devoted attentions of his now distracted widow, and by the presence of some of his distinguished and faithful friends.

I have the honour to be, Sir
Your most obedient humble servant.

At 7:30 am the next morning, the Duke of Wellington wrote to the Mayor of Liverpool from his lodgings in nearby Roby. He had been due to receive the Freedom of the City, but felt that under the circumstances any kind of celebration would be inappropriate, and said that he would not be attending any of the planned events in the city that day. The planned parades and ceremonial dinner were cancelled, but in the absence of rapid transit or mass communication there was no way to notify most of the city's population. While some shops had heard the news and remained shuttered, the ships in Liverpool's docks remained festooned with brightly coloured streamers, and sounded their horns at the time the Duke was expected to be passing.

=== Inquest ===
Given Huskisson's importance, and the potential impact on the future of Liverpool and Manchester's industries and on the embryonic railway industry of any findings of liability on the part of the railway, a swift determination of the causes of the accident was considered essential. By 9:00 am on the morning after the accident, a hastily convened coroner's jury was assembled in the Grapes public house in Eccles. The coroner himself, Mr Milne, arrived at 10:00 am and was in a hurry to proceed as he had another inquest scheduled that afternoon, but proceedings were unable to begin as Lord Wilton, the only sworn witness scheduled to attend the inquest, could not be found. In the meantime, Milne sent the jury to the vicarage to view Huskisson's body.

After his death Huskisson's body had been moved from the sofa on which he had died to an upstairs bedroom. On arrival at the vicarage Emily Huskisson refused to allow the jury to view the body, insisting on being allowed to remain alone with her husband. Eventually she had to be forcibly removed from the room, and the jury went into the bedroom in small groups to view the body. As "they did not think it necessary to look at the injured parts at all", they took only a brief glance at the body, and soon afterwards returned to the Grapes.

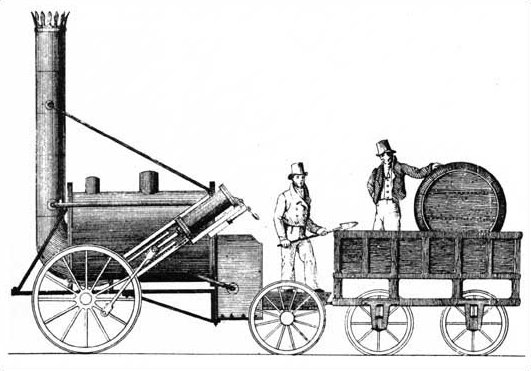
Rocket as it appeared before alterations in 1834.

Eventually a little after noon Wilton arrived at the inquest, and gave a full account of the incident. Lord Granville (half-brother of the Marquess of Stafford) told the jury that Huskisson had been suffering from numbness in his leg from a previous operation, and that this may have caused his apparent problems with movement. No witnesses recollected seeing any signal flags raised from any of the locomotives involved, including Rocket, although a system of warning flags was supposed to have been in place.

Although some eyewitnesses expressed the view that Joseph Locke, driving Rocket, was at fault, following a few words from the coroner the jury returned a verdict of accidental death. The directors and engineers of the L&M were explicitly absolved of all blame, and no deodand was to be attached to the locomotive or the railway. (Note: Under English common law, a deodand (Latin: deo dandum, "to be given to God") was any object or animal considered to have caused a person's death. Objects and animals found to be deodand were forfeit to the Crown, to be destroyed or cleansed by being put to a holy purpose, or a fine paid equivalent to the value of the deodand. Had the railway itself been found to be deodand it would have bankrupted the company.)

After the inquest was over, Emily Huskisson found two speeches in William Huskisson's jacket pocket, which he had been planning to deliver following the inaugural journey. The first was a brief tribute to James Watt, the inventor of the condensing steam engine, and to all that his invention had made possible. The second was a longer speech. It was marked "to be burnt at my death", but as it was one of the last things her husband had written Emily Huskisson felt herself unable to do so.

... From the first I was a warm but disinterested advocate for the present great experiment. Now that it has been made, and difficulties of no ordinary nature overcome, I may be permitted to look back with satisfaction on the humble but zealous part I took in first promoting the attempt ... I felt that the application to Parliament for this Railway, though technically a private petition, (Note: As President of the Board of Trade when the Liverpool and Manchester Railway sought approval in Parliament in 1825, Huskisson had been bound by convention not to take a position in the parliamentary debate on whether to support the company. Huskisson felt that the scheme was so overwhelmingly in the public interest that he broke with custom to vote in support of the bill in the House of Commons.) involved great public interests—those interests which it is the special duty of the Board of Trade to countenance and encourage, and avowedly on this ground not consider it inconsistent with my character of a Minister ... Need I in the present state of the Commerce of the Country, specify what these interests are? Most of those who hear me know well with what difficulties we have to struggle in maintaining a successful competition with foreign rivals. They know well that it can only be maintained by incessant industry, by unwearied diligence, by constantly increasing skill in our manufacturing population; but they know well that all their efforts would be unavailing without the greatest economy not of money only but of time, in all the operations of trade ... In short, the principle of a Railway is that of commerce itself—it multiplies the enjoyment of Mankind by increasing the facilities and diminishing the labour by which [goods] are produced and distributed throughout the world.

Huskisson's death was a major incident, and was reported worldwide. (William Huskisson is often reported as the first railway fatality, including in ordinarily reliable sources. This is untrue; at least two people were killed on the Liverpool and Manchester Railway prior to its opening to the public. The earliest recorded fatality caused by a steam locomotive was an unnamed woman, described as "a blind American beggar", fatally injured by a train on the Stockton and Darlington Railway on 5 March 1827. As a high-profile figure killed at a high-profile event, Huskisson was the first railway fatality to be widely reported.) As news of the incident gradually spread across the country, railways and steam power, matters which had previously been of interest only to those involved in industries directly affected by them, became a major topic for discussion in Britain. For the first time, the population as a whole became aware that cheap, rapid travel was possible, and that a journey which had previously been extremely expensive and taken the better part of a day was now affordable and took less than two hours. (Note: The fastest available stagecoach journey between Liverpool and Manchester prior to the railway's opening had taken around three hours. The journey by water, the only practical means of transport for bulk goods prior to the railway, took a minimum of 30 hours.) In the afternoon of 16 September, the day after the inauguration of the line, the Liverpool and Manchester Railway began operating a regular scheduled service. The first train carried 130 passengers (mainly members of the Society of Friends attending a meeting in Manchester), with tickets from Liverpool to Manchester costing 7s (about £35 in 2025 terms) apiece. (Note: The L&M charged 7 shillings (about £35 in 2025 terms) to travel on a fast train taking around two hours to complete the journey, or 4s in covered and 3s in open carriages (about £20 and £15 respectively, in 2025 terms) to travel in a slower train taking around three hours.) By the end of the first week of operation, 6,104 passengers had travelled on the railway.

=== Funeral ===
There was a moral sublimity in the spectacle, which all who were present felt; but which I am afraid is not communicable to those who were absent. I have seen more than one public funeral, and I know something of the gorgeous pageantry so lavishly displayed in the burials of our Monarchs; but though I saw the ashes of Grattan and Canning deposited in one of the most august of Christian temples amid the vain regrets of men the most distinguished for rank, talent, and genius, and though the interment of Royalty takes hold upon the imagination from its necessary connexion with the most sumptuous display of human pomp and greatness, I never witnessed any spectacle so impressive as the appearance of this vast multitude, standing erect under the open canopy of heaven, and joining in one spontaneous tribute of respect to the memory of their late representative.

— The Times on William Huskisson's funeral, 27 September 1830

Emily Huskisson planned for William Huskisson to be buried near the family home in Eartham in a small service. On 17 September, two days after Huskisson's death, Lord Granville and a delegation of Liverpool clergymen visited Eccles vicarage to present Emily Huskisson with a petition, signed by 264 Liverpool dignitaries, "requesting that his remains may be interred within the precincts of this town, in which his distinguished public worth and private virtue secured for him the respect and esteem of the whole community", and she agreed to his burial in Liverpool instead. She refused to allow any form of parade or pageantry, or a suggested gun salute.

On 18 September Huskisson's body was placed in a coffin which was covered with black silk. Shortly before midnight a team of men prepared to move the coffin to a hearse which had been parked outside since the afternoon, but Emily Huskisson refused to allow them to take the body. Instead, she spent another night in the vicarage with the coffin. The next morning she left in a horse-drawn carriage with the windows covered. The coffin, meanwhile, set off in the hearse for Liverpool. Although the funeral party changed horses only at remote and quiet coaching inns to avoid attention, it gathered followers as it progressed; by the time it reached Liverpool Town Hall late that evening, the hearse was followed by at least 10 carriages and more than 500 mourners on foot.

For William Huskisson's funeral on Friday 24 September, almost every business in Liverpool was closed. Huskisson had been a popular figure in Liverpool, and the authorities expected large numbers of people wishing to attend. In an effort to control numbers it was announced that anyone wishing to join the cortège submit a written request to the Town Hall. This proved impractical, and the authorities put up posters around the town advising that anyone in mourning dress would be allowed to join the procession. Colour-coded tickets were issued to those wishing to attend the burial, with each colour representing a different section of the cemetery, in an effort to control crowd numbers at the burial service; a total of 3,000 tickets were issued.

Although Emily Huskisson had wanted to keep the service small-scale and free from pageantry, William Huskisson had been an instrumental figure in the development of Liverpool and there was a huge amount of sympathy and respect for him. Almost all the city's inhabitants who were in a position to attend the funeral lined the route; it was estimated that 69,000 people, roughly half the city's population, attended. Reports spoke of all available space at every window being packed with onlookers, other than the house in Duke Street in which Huskisson had stayed for the 10 days before the journey, and of people climbing trees and crowding onto roofs for a better view, despite rain and hail.

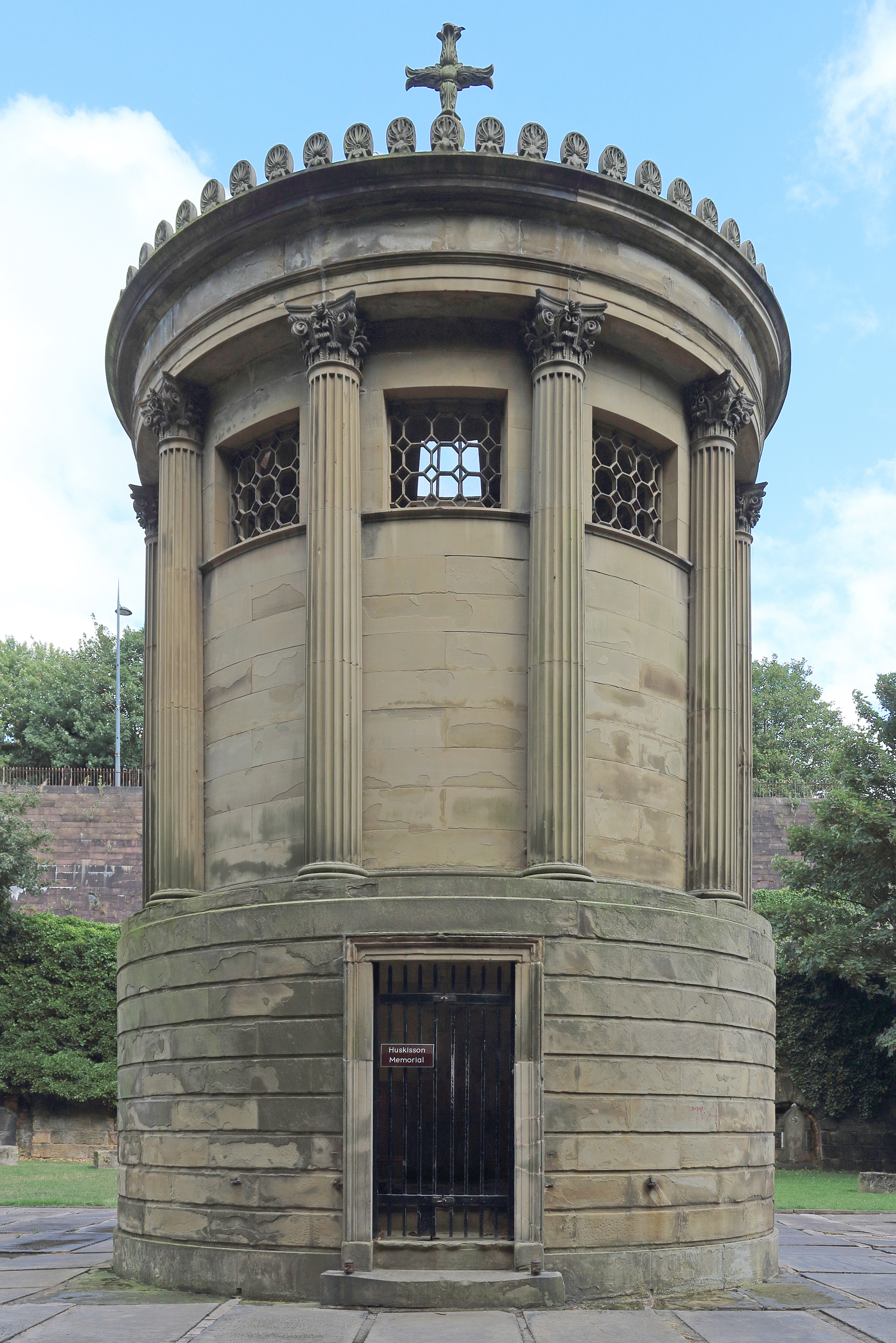
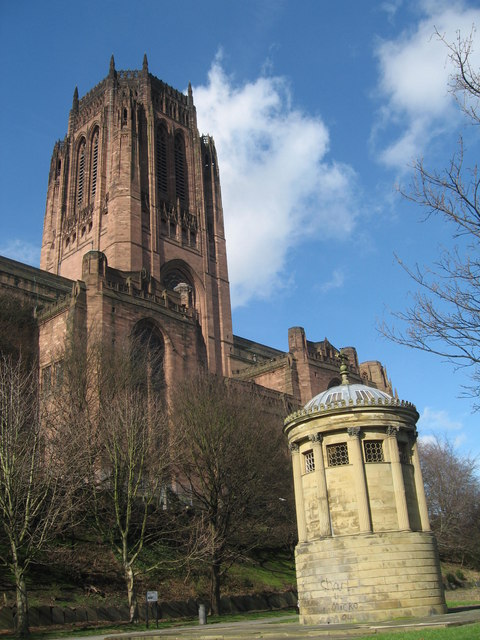
William Huskisson's grave, based on the Choragic Monument of Lysicrates. The cylindrical structure above the grave once housed a statue of Huskisson, relocated to the Walker Art Gallery in 1968. The grave is now overshadowed by nearby Liverpool Cathedral.

Huskisson's coffin was placed on a trestle table in the Town Hall, draped with black velvet and covered with feathered plumes. Between 9:00 and 10:00 am a stream of mourners were guided to the coffin by a group of truncheon men. (Note: The Liverpool City Police had not yet been formed at this time; truncheon men fulfilled the same function.) At 10:00 two mutes guided the mourners out of the town hall and mounted horses; (Note: Mutes were professional mourners, employed to attend funerals and maintain what was considered an appropriate atmosphere of sadness. The tradition of the mute derived from guards historically posted by undertakers to safeguard the body.) the rain and hail had by now eased. The mutes led the procession, followed by the mourners from the town hall and around 1,100 other mourners who had waited outside. These mourners marched six abreast, and were followed by the funeral committee, 28 local clergymen and two more mutes. Behind this group marched Joseph Brandreth and the Rev Blackburne, and behind them came carriages carrying the pall-bearers, a group of local dignitaries who had known and worked with Huskisson, followed by two more mutes. Behind this pair of mutes was a hearse carrying the coffin, followed by Huskisson's colleagues and his surviving brothers Thomas and Samuel. These in turn were followed by around 900 locals in mourning dress who had decided to join the procession, bringing the cortège to around half a mile (0.8 km) in length. The Duke of Wellington, pleading a prior commitment to attend a dinner in Birmingham, did not attend.

The procession left the town hall and slowly went the 2,000 yards (1,800 m) via Hope Street to an iron-lined grave in St James Cemetery, accompanied by muffled church bells. (Note: St James Cemetery had recently been built on the site of a former quarry. The grave was lined with iron to protect against subsidence.) Iron rails were erected along the length of the funeral procession to hold back the crowd of around 50,000 people who lined the route. Emily Huskisson, devastated by grief, did not attend the funeral. Despite her objection to gun salutes a 32-pounder cannon was fired to mark the departure of the coffin from the town hall and a 6-pounder was fired to mark the body's arrival at the cemetery, and smaller guns were fired as the procession passed. On arrival at the cemetery a short 15-minute service was held, after which Huskisson's close mourners moved to the graveside and Huskisson was placed in his grave, to the accompaniment of weeping from his brothers. Shortly before 1:00 pm another cannon shot marked the end of the service, and the crowd dispersed; pubs and restaurants throughout Liverpool remained shut for the rest of the day.

=== Controversy ===
Twelve days after the opening of the L&M, Liverpool surgeon Thomas Weatherill wrote to The Lancet questioning the official version of Huskisson's death and calling the behaviour of the doctors who had attended Eccles vicarage "unscientific, inefficient and imbecilic". He had spoken to eyewitnesses, and concluded that Huskisson's weakness and spasms following the accident were caused by blood loss, not internal injury, and that amputation would have stemmed the blood loss and saved Huskisson's life. He went on to claim that those eyewitnesses he had spoken to had seen Huskisson bleeding heavily, but that no effort had been made to stem the bleeding other than Lord Wilton's makeshift tourniquet of handkerchiefs. He argued that those doctors attending should at least have made an attempt at amputation when it became clear that other measures were not working.

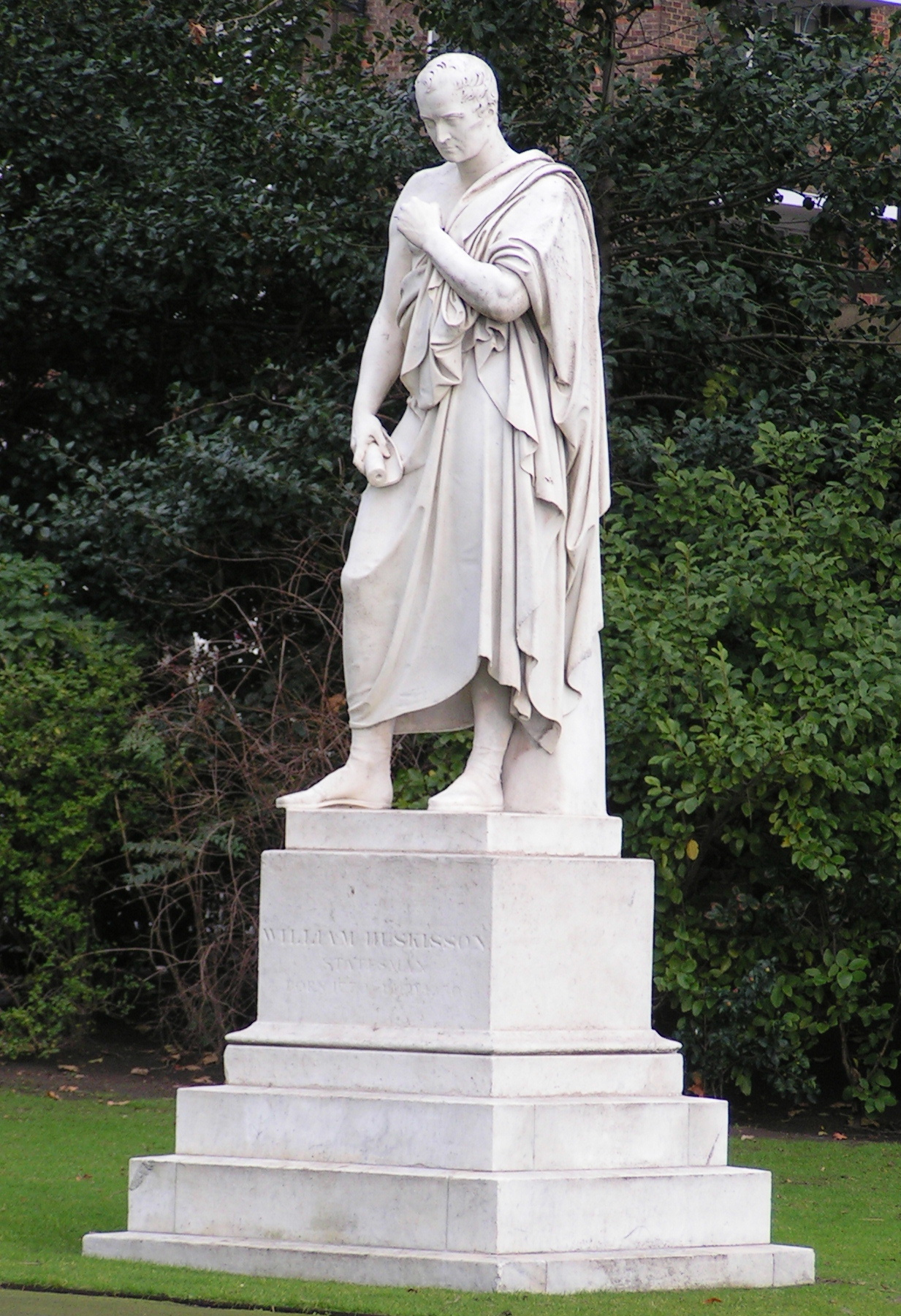
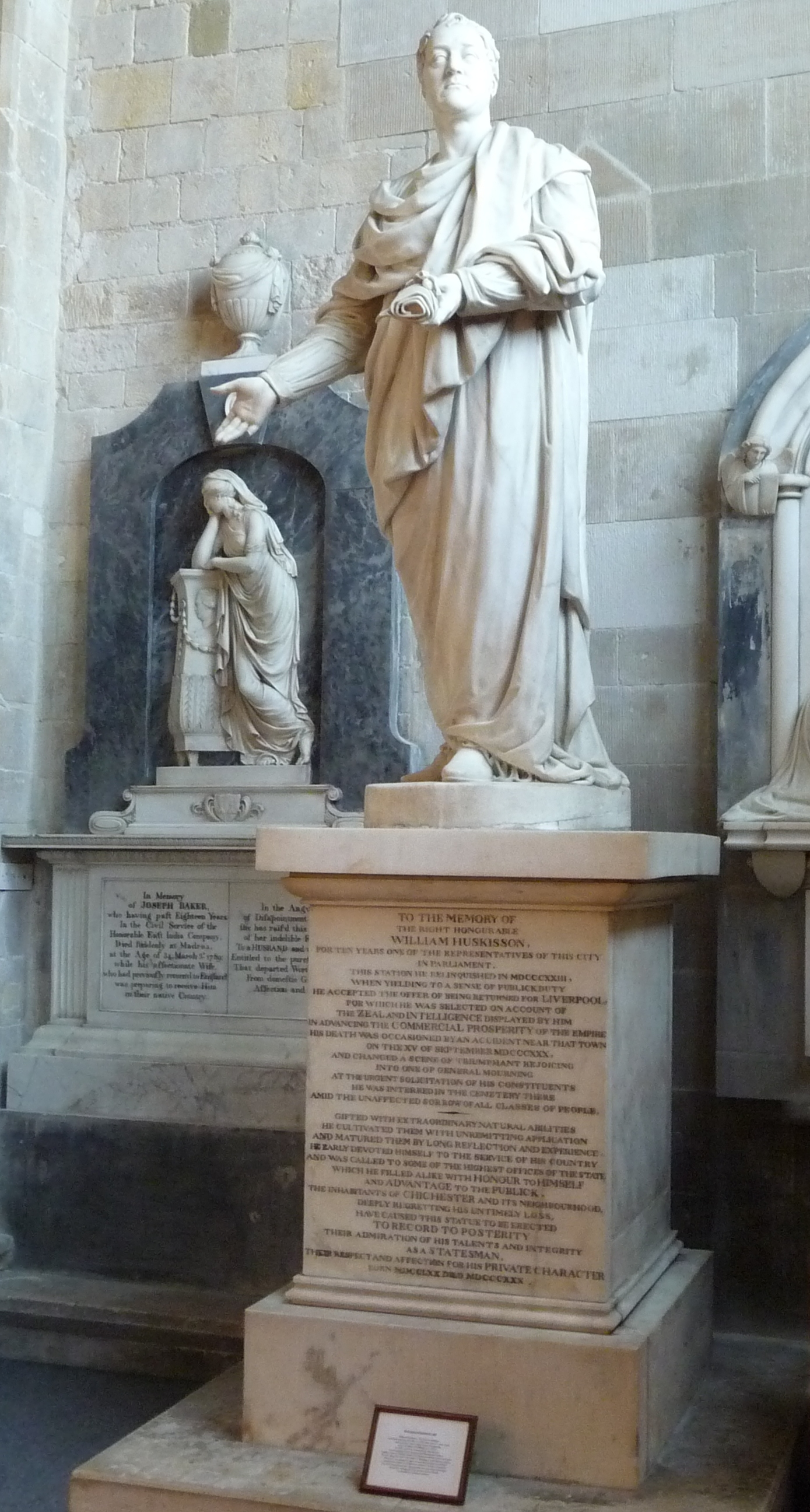
Memorials to William Huskisson in Pimlico Gardens, London (left) and Chichester Cathedral (right). Both show Huskisson in Roman dress, as did the statue on his grave.

Two weeks later William Whatton replied. He disputed Weatherill's claim that the only action taken to staunch the blood flow had been the handkerchief, and pointed out that his first action on arrival at Eccles vicarage had been to seal Huskisson's femoral artery. He stated that he had great experience with similar injuries from his time as an army doctor during the Peninsular War, and that "none of them [military surgeons] would have ventured upon an operation where the chances were so decidedly against its success". He pointed out that the survival rate for amputations among soldiers with similar injuries—considerably healthier than the 60-year old Huskisson—was no better than 15% when attempted immediately after the injury. Instead, he cited the advice of leading surgeon George James Guthrie that amputation was not generally survivable until the patient's pulse had stabilised and the initial shock settled. Whatton pointed out that Huskisson's pulse did not stabilise and that he was in convulsions for the entire time Whatton attended him.

Weatherill did not accept Whatton's defence. He continued to maintain that the delays in staunching the blood flow were "unforgivable", and that with Huskisson obviously dying there had been nothing to lose by attempting surgery. He also pointed out that if Huskisson had been fit enough to dictate a will, he may well have been fit enough to withstand an operation.

== Legacy ==
The accidents on its opening day gave the Liverpool and Manchester Railway huge amounts of publicity, and greatly increased public awareness of the potential of rapid transport. The L&M's passenger service proved immediately successful. In October the Duke of Wellington's special train was put into use as a dedicated first-class train, making four journeys each day between Liverpool and Manchester in each direction. On 4 December 1830 goods operations on the L&M began, with Planet hauling 75 tons of freight from Liverpool to Manchester. (Note: The first goods train carried 135 sacks and bales of American cotton, 200 barrels of flour, 34 sacks of malt and 63 sacks of oatmeal.) In the first six months of 1831 the L&M carried 188,726 passengers and 35,800 tons of goods; in the year from the opening in September 1830 to September 1831, almost 500,000 passengers were carried. At George Stephenson's insistence, new locomotives bought by the L&M were fitted with handbrakes from 1831.

The original Crown Street terminus soon proved unable to handle the growing popularity of the railway, and was replaced by Liverpool Lime Street railway station in 1836. With more advanced locomotives no longer needing to stop midway to take on water Parkside station soon closed, and little trace of it remains. The Liverpool and Manchester Railway remains operational as the northern of the two Liverpool to Manchester Lines. The opening of the L&M is now considered the dawn of the age of mechanised transport; in the words of industrialist and former British Rail chairman Peter Parker, "the world is a branch line of the pioneering Liverpool–Manchester run".

Spurred by the L&M's success, within a month of its opening schemes were announced to link Liverpool and Manchester to other major cities, including London, Leeds, Birmingham and Bradford, uniting the key industrial centres of England. The London and Birmingham Railway (also built by George Stephenson), the first railway to link the north and south of England, was completed in 1838. By 1840 1,775 miles (2,857 km) of track had been laid in Britain. The Railway Regulation Act 1844 limited passenger fares to one penny (1/240 of a pound sterling) per mile on the entire British railway network, enabling mass population movements, migration to the cities and long-distance commuting, and the social revolution of mass rapid transit began. In 1846 alone 272 new railways were authorised in Britain, and by 1850 over 6,200 miles (10,000 km) of railways were in place and Britain's transformation into an industrial superpower was complete. The expertise of Britain's railway pioneers itself became a major export, and British engineers (including Stephenson) supplied almost all the locomotives and rails for the railways then being built across Europe and North America.

=== Rocket ===
Rocket remained in use with the L&M after the accident, albeit rarely used for anything other than internal engineering duties. The more advanced Planet design was better suited to heavy loads, and Rocket became redundant. In 1834 it was used for experiments with new drive systems, after which it was put in storage. In 1836 it was sold to the Midgeholme Colliery, and used to haul coal until 1844. (Note: Gibbon (2010) gives a date of 1840 for the withdrawal of Rocket from colliery use.)

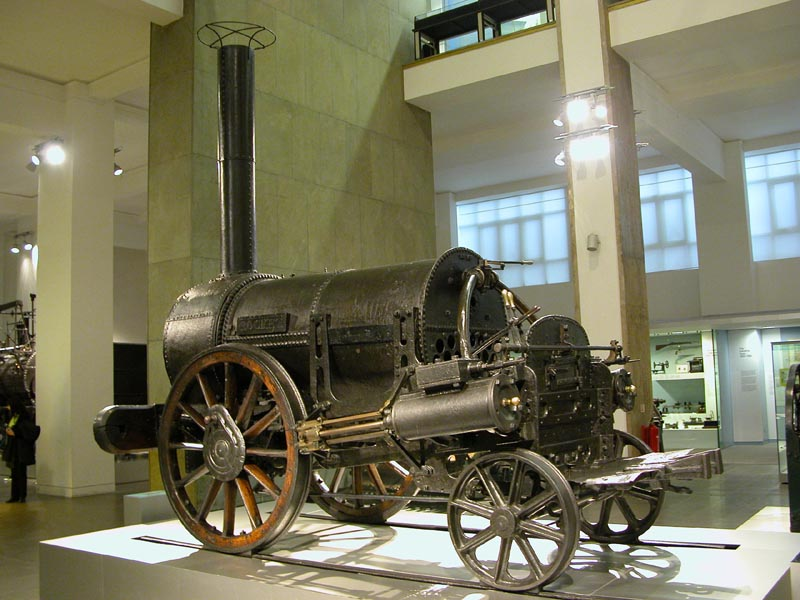
Rocket in 2004. The design has been substantially modified since the 1830s but it retains its original wheels.

Subsequently recognised as the design from which all later locomotives are derived, Rocket eventually came to be considered one of the most important symbols of the Industrial Revolution. It was returned to Robert Stephenson and Company in 1851 with the intention of displaying it at The Great Exhibition, but this did not take place. It was loaned to the Patent Office for display in 1862. Moved to the Science Collection of the South Kensington Museum in 1876 (renamed the Science Museum in 1885), it has remained there ever since other than a brief display at the National Railway Museum.

In 1929 a replica Rocket was commissioned from Robert Stephenson and Company by Henry Ford, using Stephenson's original construction techniques. It was intended as a centrepiece of the Henry Ford Museum, where it remains. Another fully functioning replica was built in the 1970s for the National Railway Museum. In 1999, to mark the 170th anniversary of the Rainhill Trials, the Trials were re-enacted on the Llangollen Railway using this replica and replicas of Novelty and Sans Pareil, the other serious contenders in 1829. Rocket again won.

As of 2010 the original Rocket is one of the main exhibits of the Science Museum's showpiece Making the Modern World gallery. Although much altered, it retains the original wheels which crushed Huskisson.

=== Duke of Wellington ===
Huskisson's supporters refused an offer to return to the Duke of Wellington's cabinet after his death, and at the beginning of November Wellington announced to Parliament that "the constitution needed no improvement and that he would resist any measure of parliamentary reform as long as he was in office". Fearing serious social unrest, large numbers of Tory MPs rebelled in a vote on governmental expenses. On 15 November 1830, exactly two months after the opening of the Liverpool and Manchester Railway, Wellington lost a vote of no confidence and was replaced as prime minister a week later by Earl Grey. Grey set about reforming Britain's corrupt and antiquated electoral procedure, the issue over which Huskisson had resigned. In 1832 the Representation of the People Act (commonly known as the Reform Act) was finally passed.

Wellington spent the remainder of his life implacably opposed to railways, complaining that they would "encourage the lower classes to travel about". He avoided them for more than a decade, before agreeing in 1843 to accompany Queen Victoria for a trip on the London and South Western Railway (designed by Joseph Locke, driver of Rocket on 15 September 1830). He died of a stroke on 14 September 1852; it is estimated that one and a half million people attended his funeral.

=== William and Emily Huskisson ===
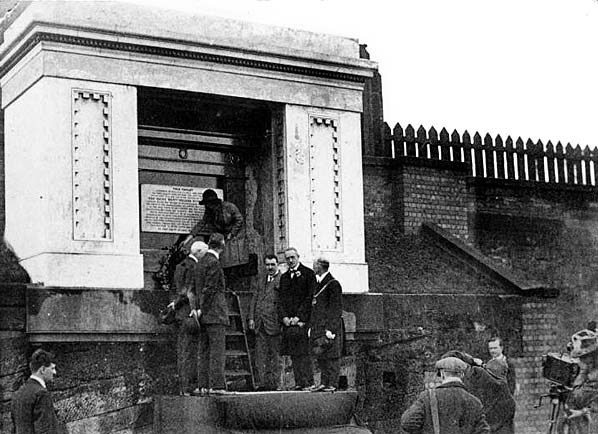
Huskisson Memorial 1913

William Huskisson's death made him one of the most famous British politicians of the period. Within a year his first biography was published, as was a volume of his collected speeches. His policies on free trade and minimal government interference were a major influence on Robert Peel and William Ewart Gladstone (who grew up in Liverpool and whose father Sir John Gladstone had been a close colleague of Huskisson) and consequently on the later emergence of the Liberal Party and the doctrine of Gladstonian Liberalism. Forty years after his death Huskisson was still sufficiently well-remembered to be featured in novels, including Middlemarch and the novels of Mrs Henry Wood, with no accompanying explanation. The Australian town of Huskisson, New South Wales, is named for him. Huskisson Dock, named in his honour in 1852, remains in operation as part of the Port of Liverpool. In 1880 Huskisson railway station in Liverpool opened, closing to passengers five years later but remaining operational as a goods depot until 1975. Today he is principally remembered for the manner of his death, and monuments to him stand in Pimlico, Chichester Cathedral, and Liverpool. In 1982, at a time of high racial tension following the Toxteth riots, his memorial in Liverpool was pulled down by a group of local people in the mistaken belief that it commemorated a slave trader; or on account of Huskisson's opposition to the abolition of slave-ownership as Liverpool M.P. It was re-erected around 20 years later in Duke Street, near where he had stayed for his final nights in Liverpool.

Emily Huskisson returned to Eartham and lived a quiet life, dedicated to keeping alive her husband's memory. She died in 1856. She never returned to Liverpool, and never again travelled by train.

On the ruins of Parkside station stands a white stone memorial, once badly damaged by vandals but since restored. The original inscription from the memorial has been removed for safekeeping, and is now displayed in the National Railway Museum.

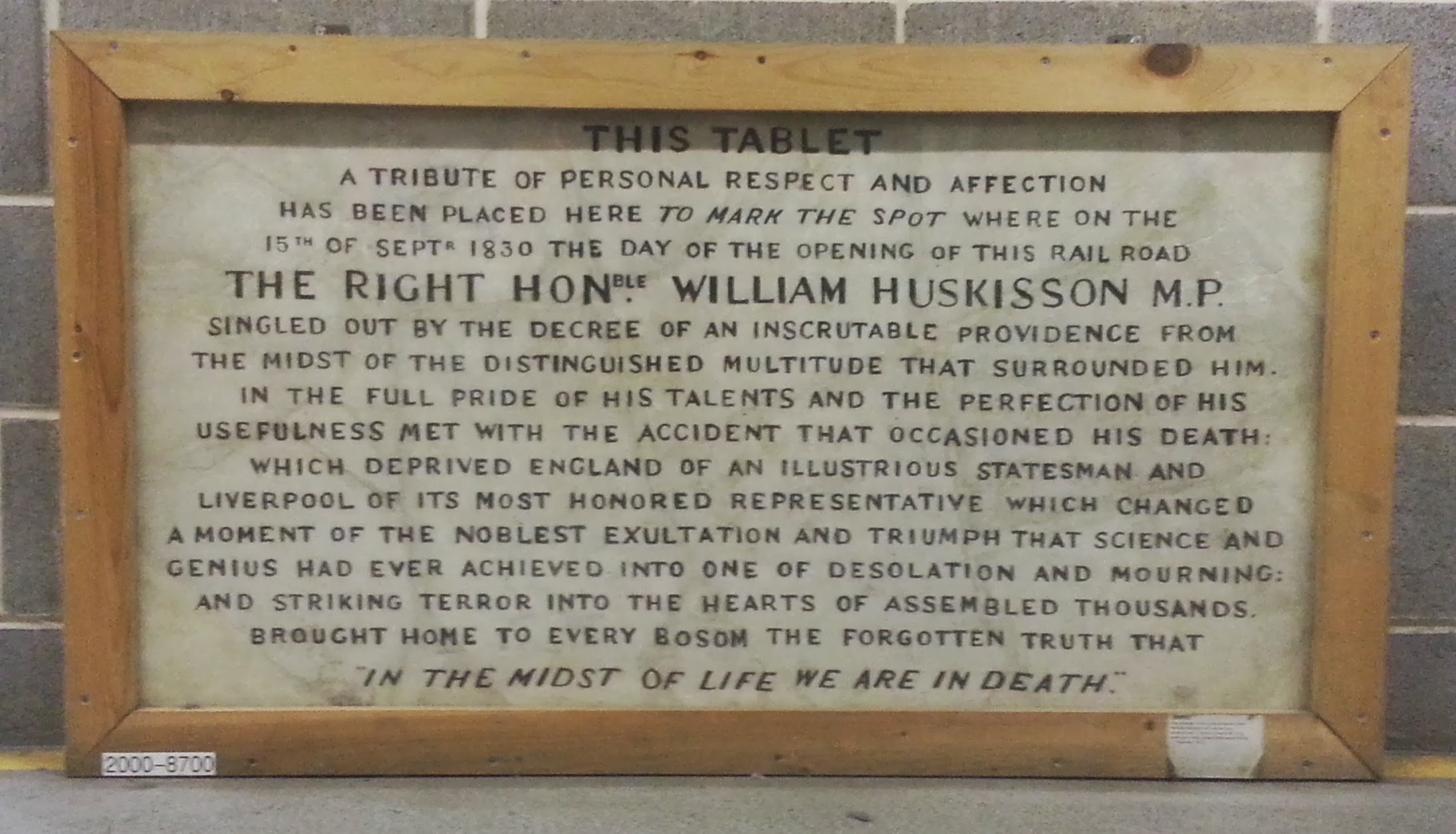
Original tablet from the Huskisson Memorial, now in the National Railway Museum.

THIS TABLET
A tribute of personal respect and affection
Has been placed here to mark the spot where on the 15th of Sept^{r} 1830 the day of the opening of this rail road
THE RIGHT HON^{BLE} WILLIAM HUSKISSON M.P.
Singled out by the decree of an inscrutable providence from the midst of the distinguished multitude that surrounded him.
In the full pride of his talents and the perfection of his usefulness met with the accident that occasioned his death;
Which deprived England of an illustrious statesman and Liverpool of its most honored representative which changed a moment of the noblest exultation and triumph that science and Genius had ever achieved into one of desolation and mourning;
And striking terror into the hearts of assembled thousands, brought home to every bosom the forgotten truth that
"IN THE MIDST OF LIFE WE ARE IN DEATH."
