= Arnos Vale Cemetery =

Cemetery in Bristol, England

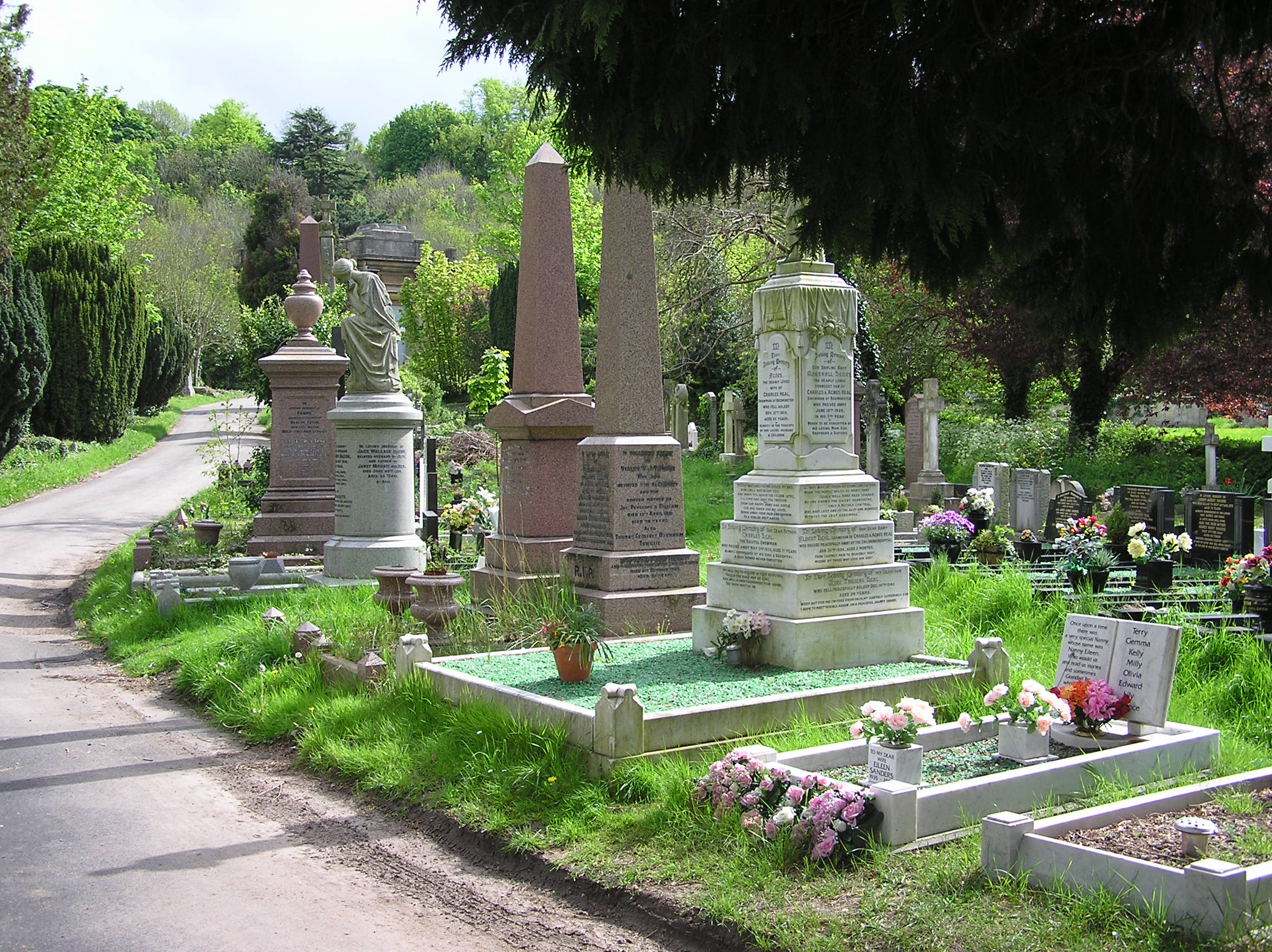
- Part of the cemetery in 2005
- Interactive map of Arnos Vale Cemetery

Details
- Established: 1837
- Location: Arnos Vale, Bristol, England
- Coordinates: 51°26′24″N 2°34′03″W
- Size: 45 acres (18 ha)
- Website: arnosvale.org.uk

National Register of Historic Parks and Gardens
- Official name: Arnos Vale Cemetery
- Designated: 30 April 1987
- Reference no.: 1000559

Arnos Vale Cemetery (grid reference ST606716) (also written Arno's Vale Cemetery), in Arnos Vale, Bristol, England, was established in 1837. Its first burial was in 1839. The cemetery followed a joint-stock model, funded by shareholders. It was laid out as an Arcadian landscape with buildings by Charles Underwood. Most of its area is Grade II* listed on the Register of Historic Parks and Gardens.

Arnos Vale Cemetery is on the A4 road from Bristol to Bath, southeast of the city centre towards Brislington, about 1 mile (1.6 km) from Temple Meads railway station and about 2 miles (3.2 km) from Bristol bus station.

The cemetery has a number of listed buildings and monuments, including the Grade II* listed Church of England mortuary chapel, Nonconformist mortuary chapel, entrance lodges and gates and the screen walls to the main entrance.

== History ==
The cemetery was designed by Charles Underwood in the style of a Greek Necropolis. Within a few years of its opening in 1837 it became the most fashionable place to be buried in Bristol.

During the 20th century the cemetery fell into disrepair, and local groups began campaigning for its restoration. In 1987 the owner disclosed plans to exhume the bodies and develop the site for housing. Early in the 21st century, following a public campaign, the site was subject to a compulsory purchase order by Bristol City Council.

In 2003 it was featured on the BBC programme Restoration. The cemetery was a South West region runner-up and has since received a £4.8 million Heritage Lottery Fund grant. The cemetery underwent significant restoration, following the Mortuary Chapel, entrance lodges and gates and Nonconformist Mortuary Chapel being added to the English Heritage Heritage at Risk Register. They were removed from the list in 2010.

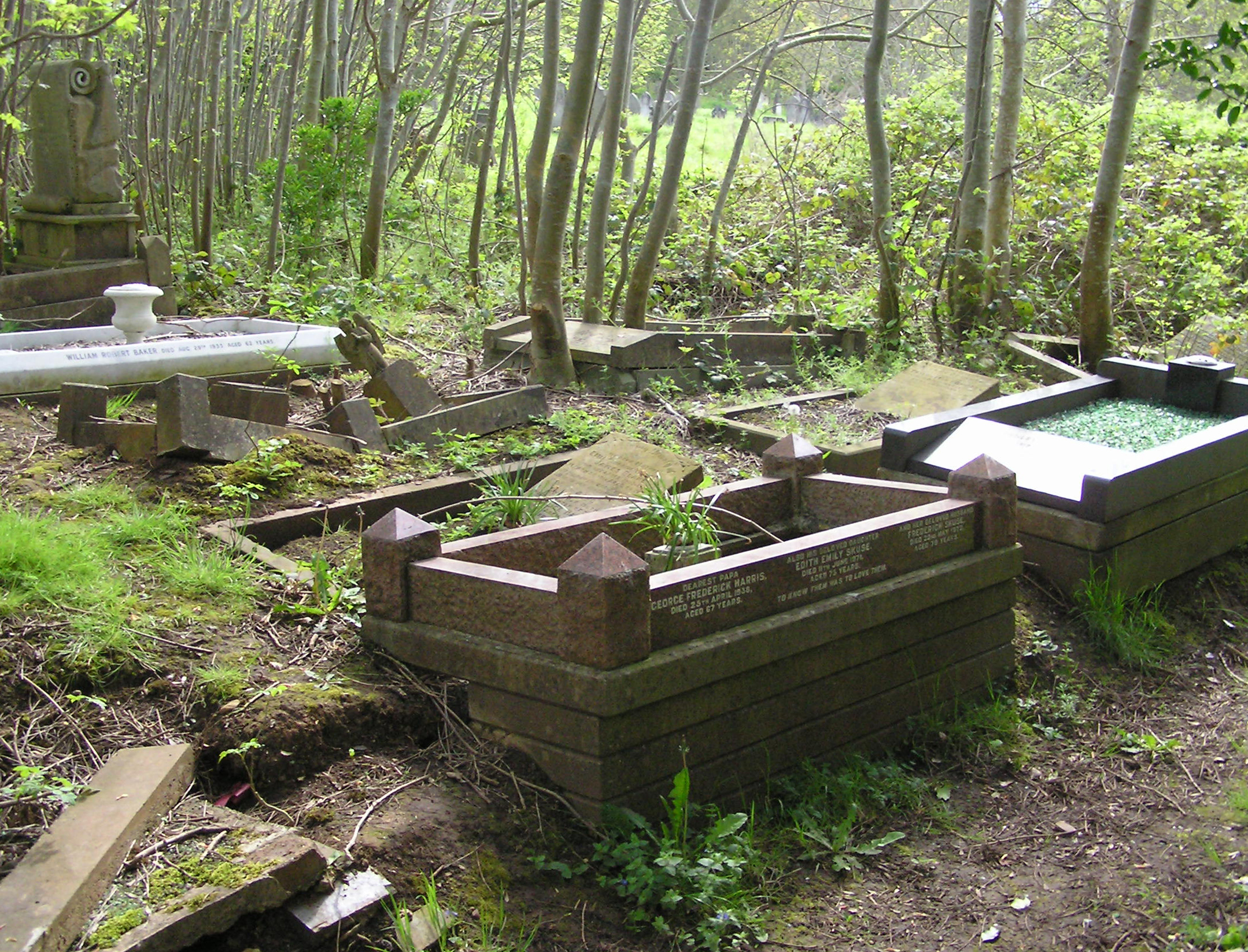
Broken gravestones awaiting restoration

== Notable people buried at Arnos Vale ==
- Charles Baggs (1806–1845), Roman Catholic bishop
- Harry Bamford (1920–1958), professional footballer
- Roland Brotherhood (1812–1883), engineer and friend of Isambard Kingdom Brunel
- Daniel Burges (1873–1946), Victoria Cross recipient and World War I hero (cremated)
- Mary Carpenter (1807–1877), educational and social reformer
- Gronow Davis (1828–1891), Victoria Cross recipient and Crimean War hero
- Sir Claude Dansey (1876-1947), intelligence chief
- Elsie Joy Davison (1910–1940), Air Transport Auxiliary pilot, the first female British aviator to die in World War II (cremated)
- Dora Greenwell (1821–1882), poet
- Anthony Norris Groves (1795–1853), missionary
- James Hosken (1798–1885), captain of the steamships SS Great Western and the SS Great Britain
- George Müller (1805–1898), orphanage founder
- George Rawson (1807–1889), hymnwriter
- Elisha Smith Robinson (1817–1885), industrialist, Mayor of Bristol 1866 and benefactor
- Raja Ram Mohan Roy (1772–1833), Indian social reformer
- Jim Sanders (1932–2007), professional footballer and showman
- Sir Charles Wathen (1833–1893), clothier, Mayor of Bristol
- William Day Wills (1797–1865), industrialist and tobacco manufacturer
- Henry Overton Wills II (1800–1871), industrialist and tobacco manufacturer
- Sir Frank William Wills (1852–1932), architect, surveyor and Mayor of Bristol
- Harry Blanshard Wood (1882–1924), Victoria Cross recipient and World War I hero
- John King, (1766-1846), surgeon and artist

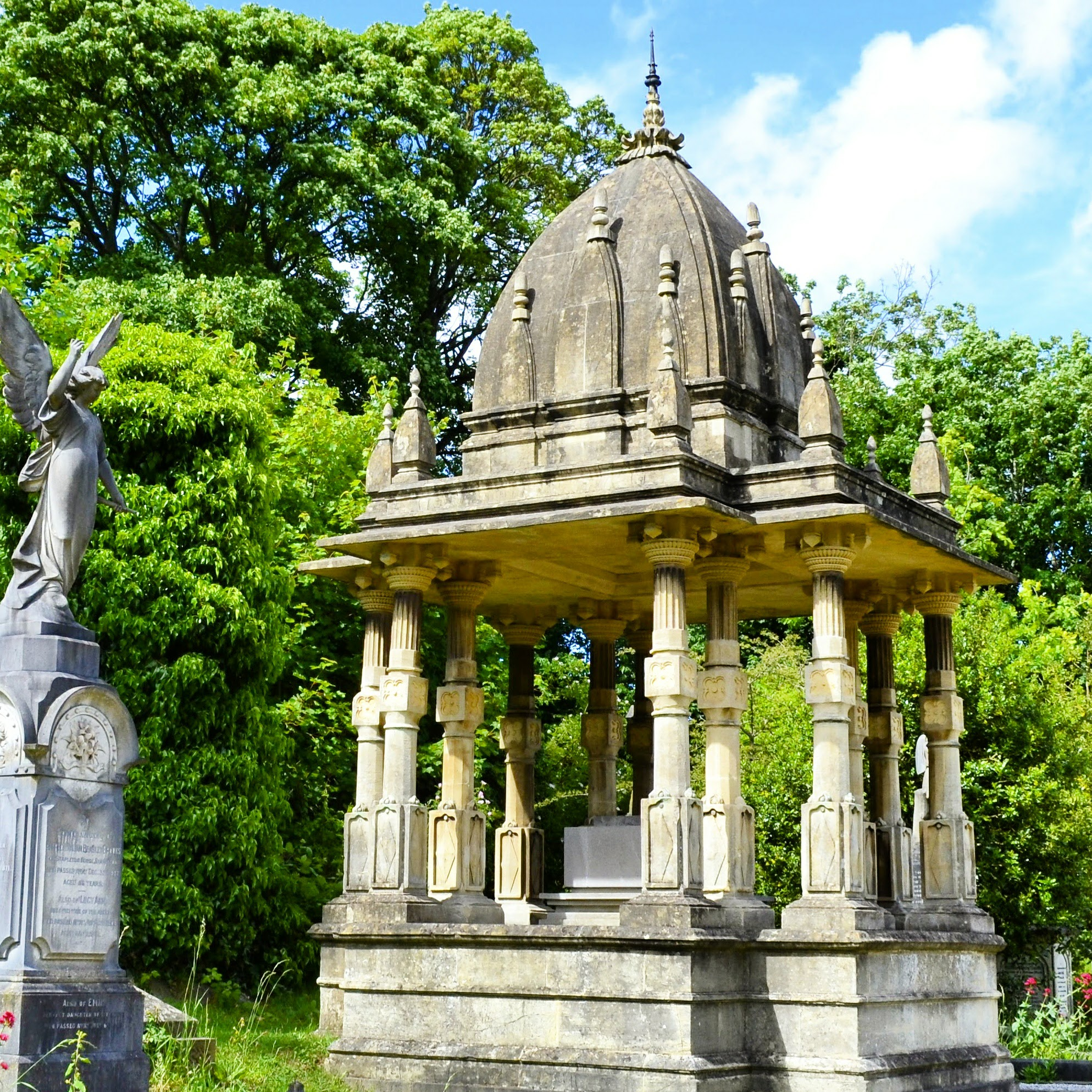
Tomb of Raja Rammohun Roy

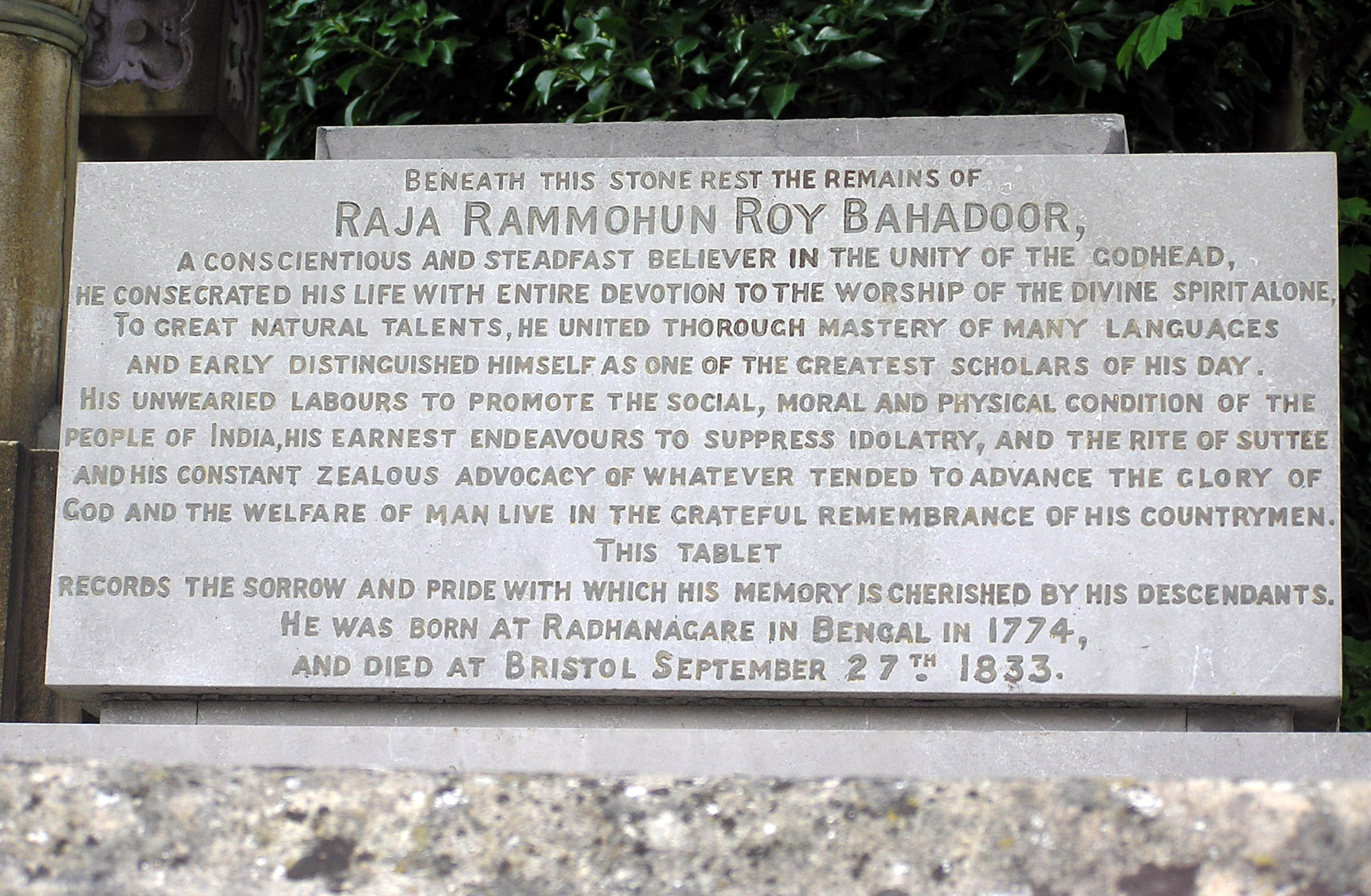
Epitaph for Raja Rammohun Roy

== Chhatri of Raja Ram Mohan Roy ==
The reformer Raja Ram Mohan Roy (22 May 1772 – 27 September 1833) died in Bristol and was first buried at Stapleton, but was reinterred in 1843 in the newly laid out Arnos Vale under the mausoleum designed by William Prinsep, which is a copy of an Indian tomb or chhatri (literally meaning umbrella). According to information available at the cemetery, a commemoration is held annually at this chhatri, attended by Unitarians, Bristol's Lord Mayor and the Indian High Commissioner plus Indians and British who remember with gratitude the works of the "Founder of Modern India".

A previously missing (and unknown) miniature ivory portrait bust of Raja Ram Mohan Roy was unveiled at the annual commemoration of his death at Arnos Vale cemetery, on 22 September 2013. Ram Mohan Roy challenged traditional Hindu culture and indicated the lines of progress for Indian society under British rule. The ivory portrait bust of Ram Mohan Roy made in London in 1832 by the famous ivory carver Benjamin Cheverton (1796–1876), is based on a bust made around the same time by the sculptor George Clarke (1796–1842). The bust is exceptional because Ram Mohan Roy gave sittings to Clarke (the only time he did this for a sculptor) to enable the bust to be modelled, and Cheverton copied the bust in ivory for George Clarke, who lent his model to Cheverton to enable this to be done. The process employed by Cheverton to make the copy means that it is identical with Clarke's bust, save that it is on a reduced scale. Clarke's bust is missing, and this small ivory bust is the finest three-dimensional representation of Ram Mohan Roy that exists, since it reflects exactly what was observed when the great man sat to Clarke to have his bust modelled.

== War graves ==
More than 500 British Commonwealth servicemen and women from both World Wars commemorated by the Commonwealth War Graves Commission (CWGC) are buried or listed at the cemetery, mostly from military hospitals of the area. Most of the 356 servicemen from World War I are buried in the 'Soldiers Corner' plot near the main entrance. Special memorials commemorate one casualty whose grave could not be located and another buried at Bedminster Church Cemetery whose grave could not be maintained. There are 149 servicemen and women from World War II buried at Arnos Vale, all in scattered graves apart from a group in a plot in the upper part of the cemetery who were from the Naval Hospital in Barrow Gurney. Those whose graves are not marked by headstones are listed on four bronze panels on a screen wall memorial. Nearly 70,000 casualties from the Western Front were brought to Bristol on trains and in hospital ships, "and the relatively small number of servicemen buried in Bristol indicates that, once a wounded serviceman reached England, his chances of survival were quite good".

The memorial, designed by W H Watkins, commissioned by the British Red Cross Society and paid for by public subscription, was unveiled by Emily, Duchess of Beaufort and dedicated by the Bishop of Bristol, the Right Rev George Nickson on 21 October 1921. It consists of a central gallery of five arches (with the four bronze panels on the wall directly behind the two pairs of arches either side of the central arch) and two flanking walls. On which are carved the inscriptions:

	Proclaim throughout the realm
The glorious dead	Ye who pass this monument
AD 1914–1918	That we who died serving her
	Rest here content (Note: This is very similar to the epitaph on the earlier Wagon Hill Cemetery Monument near Ladysmith in South Africa which is dedicated to 14 members of the Imperial Light Horse who fell at the Battle of Wagon Hill during the Boer War, and was inspired by the famous epitaph of Simonides at Thermopylae.)

Another memorial erected by the CWGC commemorates 69 service personnel who were cremated at the crematorium during World War II.

== Archives ==
Burial registers are held by the Arnos Vale Cemetery Trust. Records of the Friends of Arnos Vale Cemetery are held at Bristol Archives (Ref. 45068) (online catalogue).

== Grade II listed monuments ==
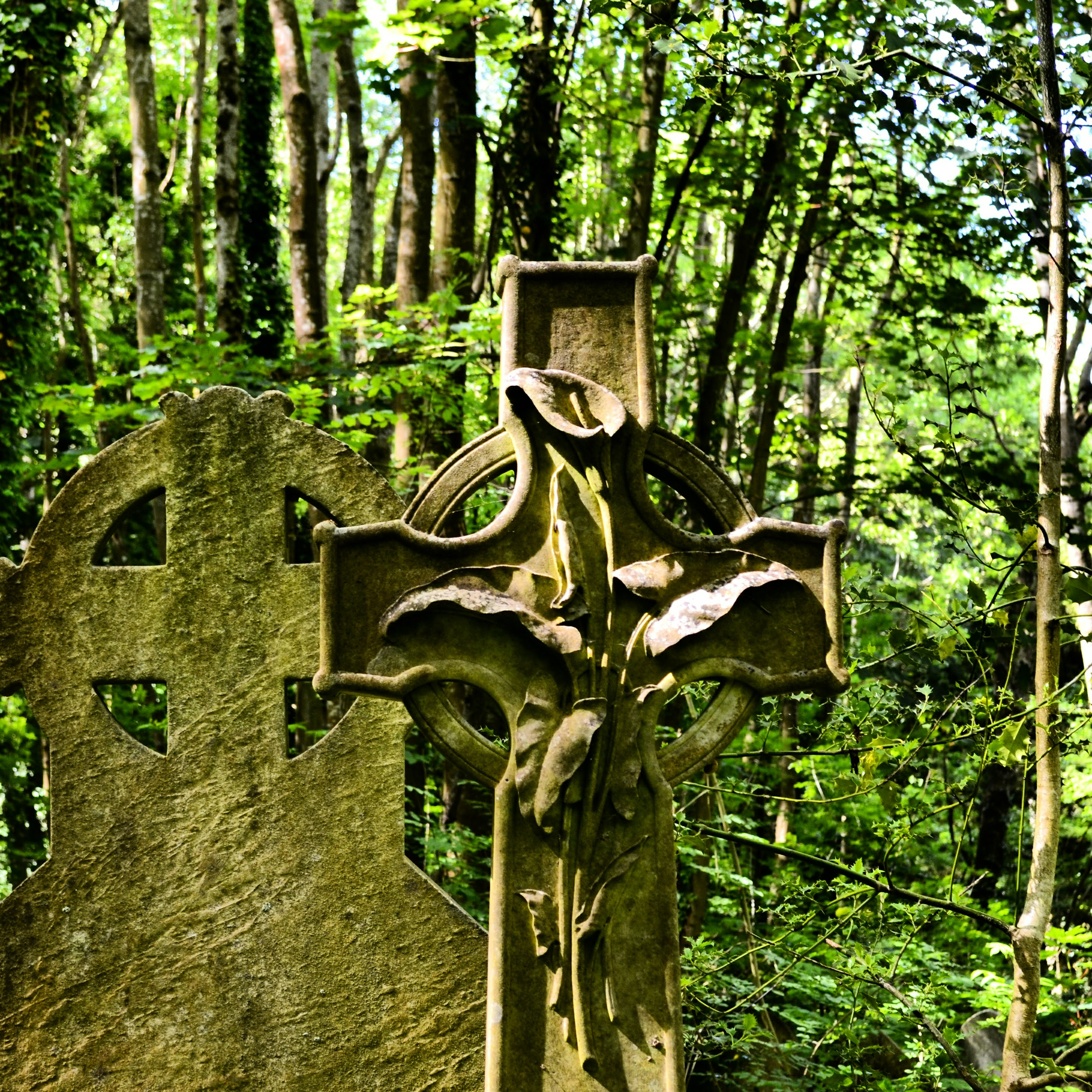
A Celtic Cross from Arnos Vale Cemetery with a lily carved into the stone. This exceptional example of carving has led to its Grade II listed status.

- 1852 monument to James Bartlett
- 1857 monument to Thomas Lucas
- 1857 monument to Francis Barber Ogden
- 1860 monument to John Tilly
- 1880 obelisk memorial
- 1890 monument to Heber Denty
- Monument 2 metres east of Tilly monument
- The War Memorial
- Monument to Francis Bennett
- Monument to Mary Breillat
- Monument to Challenger family
- Monument to Susannah Clark
- Monument to Thomas Daniel Doddrell
- Monument to Lieut. James Gardner
- Monument to Gwyer family
- Monument to Harwood
- Monument to Thomas Gadd Matthews
- Monument to Melsom family
- Monument next to Tilly monument
- Monument to Elizabeth Paddon
- Monument to PC Richard Hill
- Monument to Rev. John Pratt
- Monument to Thomas Renolds
- Monument to Dr Thomas Tovey Smart
- Monument to Isabella Weston
- Monument to Rev. Walter Whiting
- Monument to Joseph Williams

== See also ==
- Grade II* listed buildings in Bristol
