= Jim Sanders (footballer) =

English footballer and showman

Personal information
- Full name: James Charles Alfred Sanders
- Date of birth: 15 October 1932
- Place of birth: Marlborough, Wiltshire, England
- Date of death: 20 May 2007 (aged 74)
- Place of death: Bristol, England
- Position: Half back

Senior career*
Years	Team	Apps	(Gls)
1951–1955	Bristol City	0	(0)
1955–1959	Crystal Palace	46	
1959–?	Rochdale		
?–1962	Cheltenham Town		
1962–1963	Exeter City	20	
- * Club domestic league appearances and goals

James Charles Alfred Sanders (15 October 1932 – 20 May 2007) was an English footballer who played as a half back, most notably for Crystal Palace.

== Biography ==
Sanders signed a professional contract with Bristol City in November 1951. Unable to break into the first team, he left to sign for London club Crystal Palace.

After playing for Rochdale and Cheltenham Town, Sanders signed for Exeter City in August 1962. He was a regular for the Grecians up until December, but in April 1963 his contract was cancelled due to the club not being able to provide local accommodation for his family, then based in Bristol, to move into.

During and after his playing career, Sanders also worked as a showman. Both of his careers are mentioned on his grave, a statue of a footballer, in Arnos Vale Cemetery.
