= Francis Barber Ogden =

Francis Barber Ogden (1783-1857) was United States consul, in Liverpool from 1829 to 1840 and then in Bristol. Ogden had a long-standing interest in steam engines and, soon after becoming consul in Liverpool, attended the Rainhill Trials where he met and befriended John Ericsson. Ogden helped finance Ericsson's researches over the next few years, while personally patenting Ericsson's inventions in the United States - which Ericsson, not being an American citizen, would not have been able to do before 1836. These inventions culminated in that of screw-propelled steamboats - for these, Ericsson's rival Francis Pettit Smith obtained the British patent but Ogden, on Ericsson's behalf, obtained the American patent. Ericsson named his first screw-propelled steamboat Francis B. Ogden - this boat was demonstrated to the British Admiralty, but rejected by them. Ogden now introduced Ericsson to one of his business associates, Robert Stockton, who would become Ericsson's next patron and induce him to move to America.

Ogden was a member of the Society of Cincinnati. He was buried at Arnos Vale Cemetery, Bristol, England. His monument there consists of an obelisk adorned with a coat of arms: Paly of 12, a chief charged with thirty-two mullets (five-pointed stars) 12,9 and 11. Above the shield a bald-headed eagle displayed holding in its dexter claw an olive branch, in its sinister claw a sheaf of six arrows. Beneath the shield, on a scroll, the motto: E Pluribus Unum. The inscription runs: "Sacred to the Memory of Francis ..... Ogden, A Member of the Society of the Cincinnati and Consul of the United States of America for this Port. Born at Boonton in the State of New Jersey, U.S.A., March 3rd 1783. Died at his Residence in this City, July 4th 1857, aged 74 years, having Served his Country during a Period of Twenty-Eight Years."

== See also ==
Society of Cincinnati
