= Saunders =

Saunders is a surname of English and Scottish origin, derived from Sander, a mediaeval form of Alexander.

== People ==
- Ab Saunders (1851–1883), American cowboy and gunman
- Al Saunders (born 1947), American football coach
- Alan Saunders (broadcaster) (1954–2012), broadcaster for the Australian Broadcasting Corporation
- Alan Saunders (police officer) (1886–1964), Inspector-General of Police in Palestine, 1937–1943
- Alan Saunders (public servant) (1892–1957), English public servant and cricketer
- Albert Charles Saunders (1874–1943), Canadian politician
- Alfred Saunders (1820–1905), New Zealand politician
- Alfred Thomas Saunders (1854–1940), generally known as A. T. Saunders, South Australian historian
- Alfred William Saunders (1888–1930), Irish soldier who served the United Kingdom in World War I
- Dame Alison Saunders (born 1961), British barrister and Director of Public Prosecutions
- Allen Saunders (1899–1986), American cartoonist
- Alvin Saunders (1817–1899), American politician
- Amy Saunders, British performer also known as Miss Behave
- Andrew Saunders (disambiguation), multiple people
- Angela Saunders (born 1977), English model and actress
- Arthur Frederick Saunders (1879–1947), British soldier
- Ben Saunders (disambiguation), multiple people
- Benjamin Saunders (professor) (born 1968), comics expert
- Bill Saunders (1898–1950), American college football coach
- Billy Saunders (born 1937), Canadian ice hockey player
- Billy Joe Saunders (born 1989), British boxer
- Bob Saunders (American football), American football coach
- Bob Saunders (baseball), baseball pitcher in the Negro leagues
- Bob Saunders (politician) (1929–2016), American politician
- Bonita Saunders, American mathematician specializing in mathematical visualization
- Bradley Saunders (born 1986), English boxer
- Bud Saunders (1884–1967), American football and basketball coach
- Catherine Saunders (1942–2026), New Zealand television and radio broadcaster
- Charles Saunders (disambiguation), multiple people
- Chris Saunders (headmaster), English headmaster and cricketer
- Christian Saunders, British United Nations official
- Cicely Saunders (1918–2005), British physician
- Clarence Saunders (grocer), American retailer
- Clarence Saunders (athlete) (born 1963), Bermudian high jumper
- Dale Saunders (disambiguation), multiple people
- Dave Saunders (volleyball) (born 1960), American volleyball player
- David Saunders (disambiguation), multiple people
- Dean Saunders (born 1964), Welsh footballer
- Debra Saunders, American journalist
- Dero A. Saunders, American journalist
- Desmond Saunders (1926–2018), British television director
- Doug Saunders (born 1967), Canadian journalist
- Drew P. Saunders, American politician
- Edith Rebecca Saunders, British biologist
- Edward Saunders (disambiguation), multiple people
- Emily Eliza Saunders (c. 1830–1875), English singer
- Ernest Saunders (born 1935), British businessman
- Flip Saunders (1955–2015), American basketball coach
- Florence Saunders Farley (1928–2022), American politician
- Franklin Saunders (1891–?), Welsh soldier
- Fred Saunders James Frederick Saunders (born 1951), American basketball player
- Frederick Saunders (librarian), British writer, librarian, bookseller, and newspaper editor
- Frederick Albert Saunders (1875–1963), American spectroscopist
- Frederick Richard Saunders, Ceylonese colonial administrator
- Gary Saunders (born 1935), Canadian writer and artist
- G. K. Saunders (1910–2005), New Zealand radio and TV writer
- George Saunders (disambiguation), multiple people
- Gloria Saunders, American actress
- Harry Saunders (disambiguation), multiple people
- Harold Saunders (disambiguation), multiple people
- Helen Saunders, British artist
- Helena Beatrice Richenda Saunders, British writer who wrote under the pseudonyms Ultra Marine and Haine Whyte
- Henry Saunders (disambiguation), multiple people
- Hilary Saint George Saunders British soldier, writer and official historian
- Howard Saunders, British ornithologist
- Hugh Saunders (disambiguation), multiple people
- Irene Saunders, American dictionary compiler
- J. J. Saunders, British historian
- Jack Saunders (disambiguation), multiple people
- Jake Saunders (1917–2002), British banker in Hong Kong
- Jason Saunders, New Zealand sailor
- Jay Saunders, Big band lead trumpeter, collegiate jazz studies educator
- Jennifer Saunders (born 1958), British comedian and actress
- Jeraldine Saunders (1923–2019), American writer
- Joe Saunders, American baseball pitcher
- Joe Saunders (politician), member of the Florida House of Representatives
- John Saunders (disambiguation), multiple people
- Jonny Saunders, English radio presenter and schoolteacher
- Joseph Saunders (disambiguation), multiple people
- Kameron Saunders (born 1992), American dancer and choreographer
- Kate Saunders, British journalist
- Khalen Saunders (born 1996), American football player
- Laurence Saunders, British preacher of the sixteenth century
- Leslie Saunders, Canadian mayor
- Margaret Marshall Saunders, Canadian writer
- Matt Saunders (disambiguation), multiple people
- Matthew Saunders, English footballer
- Matthew J. Saunders, English composer
- Melva Saunders, Australian basketball player
- Merl Saunders, American musician
- Michael Saunders (disambiguation), multiple people
- Neil Saunders (born 1983), English footballer
- Nicholas Saunders (Vice-Chancellor) of the University of Newcastle
- Nicholas Saunders (activist), British entrepreneur and MDMA advocate
- Nicholas J. Saunders (born 1953), British academic archaeologist and anthropologist
- Nigella Saunders, Jamaican badminton player
- Norman Saunders (artist), American illustrator
- Norman Saunders (politician), politician from the Turks and Caicos Islands
- Oliver Saunders, jazz pianist
- Owen Saunders, British scientist and engineer
- Pamela Saunders, American model
- Pete Saunders (born 1960), musician
- Peter Saunders (disambiguation), multiple people
- Philip Saunders (disambiguation), multiple people
- Rachel Saunders, American beauty queen
- Raven Saunders (born 1996), American track and field athlete
- Raymond Saunders (disambiguation), multiple people
- Rebecca Saunders, composer
- Reg Saunders (1920–1990), Australian army officer
- Richard Saunders (disambiguation), multiple people
- Rob Saunders (born 1968), Irish rugby union player
- Robert Saunders (disambiguation), multiple people
- Romulus Mitchell Saunders (1791–1867), North Carolina politician
- Ron Saunders, English football player and manager
- Ryan Saunders, American basketball coach
- Silvia Saunders (born 1990), English writer
- Stephen Saunders (military attache), British military attache based in Greece
- Thomas Saunders (disambiguation), multiple people
- Tobias Saunders, Deputy to the Rhode Island General Assembly
- Tony Saunders, American baseball player
- Turner Saunders (1782–1854), American Methodist preacher
- Weslye Saunders (born 1989), American football player
- Wilfred Saunders, British librarian and academic
- William Saunders (disambiguation), multiple people

== Fictional characters ==
- Campbell Saunders, in Degrassi
- Daniel (Danny) Saunders, in Chaim Potok's The Chosen and The Promise
- Finbarr Saunders, in Viz
- Grace Saunders, in the Alone in the Dark series
- Matthew "Matt" Saunders, in My Super Ex-Girlfriend
- Reb Isaac Saunders, in Chaim Potok's The Chosen and The Promise
- Saunders, a Jewel thief in the film Short Circuit 2
- Saunders, a fellow MI6 agent in the James Bond film The Living Daylights
- Speed Saunders, in DC Comics
- Stephen Saunders (24 character), in 24
- Tommy Saunders, a Boston Police Department Sergeant, in Patriots Day

== Places ==
- Saunders, Kansas, a ghost town, United States
- Saunders, Stanton County, Kansas, an unincorporated community, United States
- Saunders County, Nebraska, United States
- Saunders, Wisconsin, United States
- Saunderstown, Rhode Island, a village in the United States
- Saunders Island, South Sandwich Islands, an uninhabited island

== Other ==
- Saunders, a name for Shepherd's pie

== See also ==
- Saunders Mac Lane (1909–2005), American mathematician
- Saunders-Roe, a British aero and marine-engineering company
- Saunders (imprint), a publishing brand of Elsevier
- Saunders Secondary School, a school in London, Ontario, Canada
- Saundersfoot, a large village in Pembrokeshire, Wales
