= Anne Saunders =

Anne Saunders may refer to:

- Anne Cofell Saunders, American television writer and producer
- Ann Loreille Saunders (1930–2019), British historian and editor

== See also ==
- Saunders (surname)
