= Charles Joseph Stevens =

Australian music teacher (1841–1911)

Charles Joseph Stevens (9 May 1841 – 22 July 1911) was a music teacher, conductor and choirmaster in the early days of South Australia.

== History ==
Stevens was born in Birmingham, the youngest son of J. Stevens who at 8 years of age was accepted as a probationary chorister at Worcester Cathedral. He went on to sing at Queen Victoria's Chapels Royal in a choir of ten boys, one of whom was (later Sir) Arthur Sullivan. Privileges included board and lodging and tuition by the Queen's chaplain, Rev. T. Kilmore, M.A. He went on to serve as the first secretary of the Birmingham Triennial Music Festival.

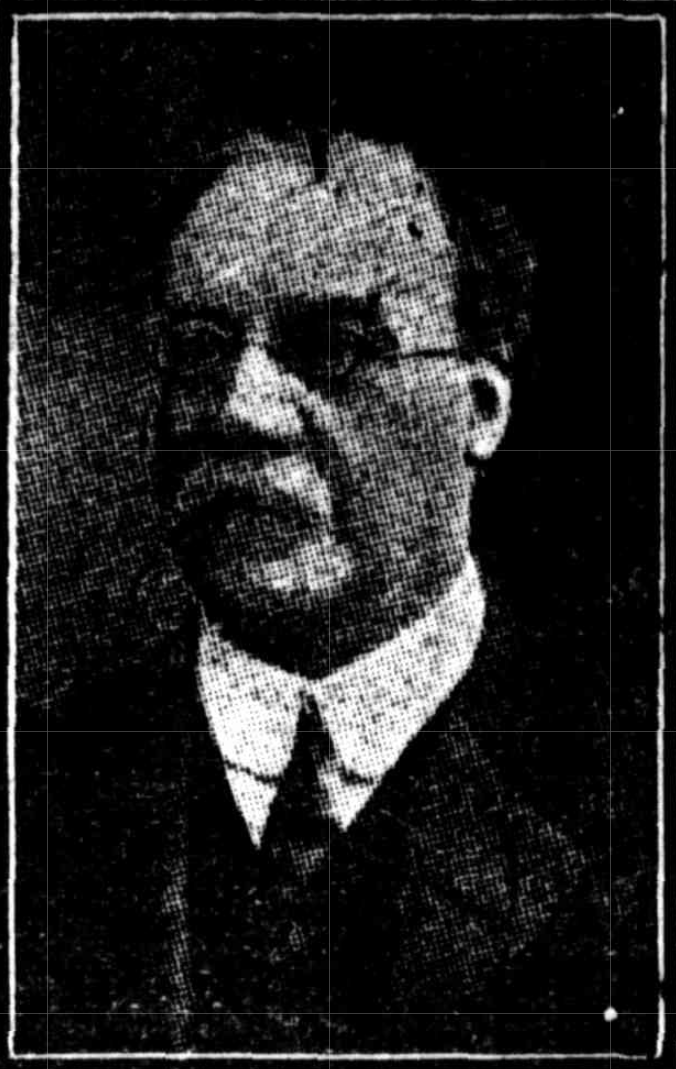
Charles Joseph Stevens

Stevens became part of the musical fabric of Birmingham. He was known to all the great composers of the day, including Mendelssohn, Gounod, and Richter. He served for over 20 years as organist at St Michael's Church, Handsworth, and was accompanist and assistant conductor of the Birmingham Festival Choir. He also conducted an elementary singing class at the Birmingham and Midland Institute. He was closely associated with the Holte Musical Society and head of the music departments of Handsworth College and the Girls' High School, Astor. He conducted concerts given by Charles Santley, Foli, Emma Albani, and Madame Patey, and toured England with Sims Reeves, Madam Rudusdorff (who?) and other famous singers. He was selected by Charles Gounod to rehearse his oratorio Redemption.

He left for Australia in search of a healthier climate and arrived in Adelaide in October 1886. At first he met hostility from the city's musical establishment, but by simple hard work and ability gradually gained acceptance. The Adelaide Musical Association, which he conducted, gained recognition for its standards of excellence. He began playing the organ at the Unitarian Church, then was appointed to Christ Church, North Adelaide, for its new instrument, and was active in wiping out its debt.

In 1886 music retailers S. Marshall and Sons founded the Adelaide Musical Association with Stevens as conductor, to produce Handel's Messiah on Christmas Night, 1886, though it clashed with a performance by the Philharmonic. P. A. Howells considered that Stevens created the Association specifically as an opponent of the Philharmonic.

On 10 February 1888 he opened an Exhibition Organ at the North Adelaide Wesleyan Church, and conducted the Adelaide Musical Association in a Sacred Concert from the organ.

- For over 20 years he conducted the 'Messiah' festivals which became a feature of the year's entertainments
- He is reported as having founded in 1888 the Adelaide Orpheus Society for the practice of male part singing, though a similar society of that name existed in 1866, perhaps associated with Robert Kay. The institution flourished, thanks to the fostering care of its founder and his successors.
- He conducted the annual performance of the Adelaide Choral Society ever since.
- He also took students privately, and in his capacity enjoyed a well-deserved popularity.
- Stevens was the first president of the South Australian Music Teachers' Association.

In April 1895 he returned to England on doctor's orders, but returned after three months with impresario P. A. Howells.

In 1903 he made a tour of England and the continent, the highlights perhaps being

- Reunion with his student Peter Dawson, and together visited Madame Albani
- Introduction to the Savage Club by Percy Grainger
- A concert at Interlaken, Switzerland
- A concert of Elgar's Coronation Ode by the Leeds Choir
- Handel Festival at The Crystal Palace and Aida at the Paris Opera

His wife remained briefly in England, furthering her studies under a Royal Academy master and gained her LRAM. During Stevens's absence, the organist B. Foxall Robinson acted as locum tenens, directing both the Orpheus and Choral societies.

Stevens died at his home in Clark Street, Wayville, after an illness of several months.

=== Compositions ===
- Anthem "Behold, O Lord. Our Defender"
- "The Child and the Bells"

== Family ==
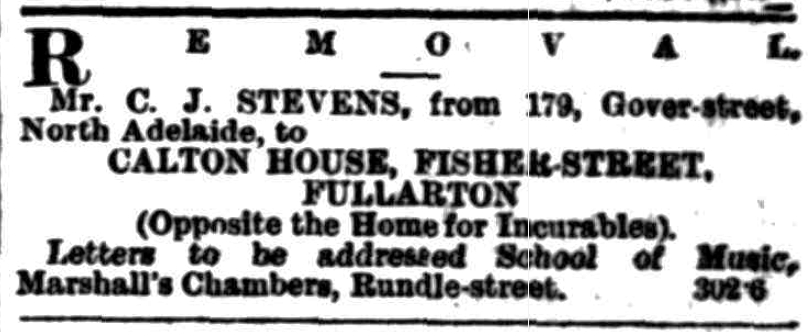
C. J. Stevens 1891 advert

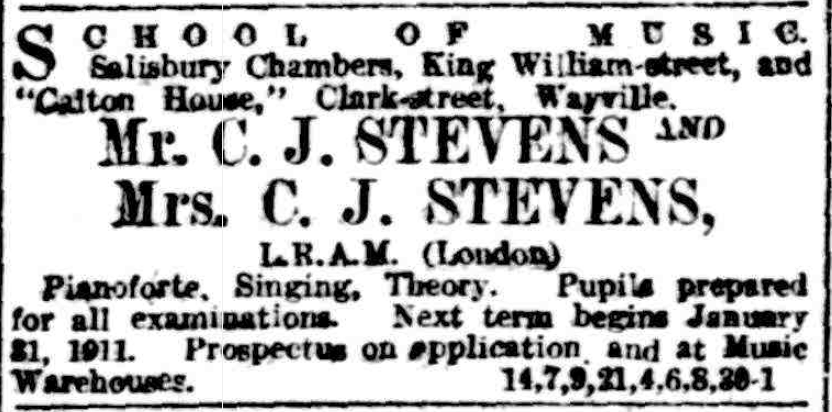
C. J. Stevens 1911 advert

Stevens married Amy Mortimer (born c. 1846) some time around 1865; they lived in Handsworth, Birmingham until 1886, when they migrated to South Australia, living in North Adelaide. She was a musician, and highly regarded for her kindness and charitable work. In 1891 they moved to Calton House, Fisher Street, Fullarton. They also maintained a summer residence at Bridgewater.

On 31 December 1895 Amy Stevens died, following a series of medical operations. They had no children. Her remains were buried at the Mitcham cemetery.

On 29 January 1897 he married again, to Alice Maud Stacy (1875– ), of Stone Hall, Prospect. Stacy had been one of Stevens's students.

Some time before 1911 they moved to Calton House, Clarke Street, Wayville, and jointly advertised as teachers of music, and where he died in July 1911.

On 28 December 1916 she married accountant Harry J. Wise, of Hobart.
