= Henry Saunders =

Henry Saunders may refer to:

- Henry Saunders (politician) (1855–1919), Australian politician
- Henry Saunders (cricketer, born 1841) (1841–1904), English cricketer for Cambridgeshire
- Henry Saunders (cricketer, born 1883) (1883–1942), English cricketer for Somerset
- Henry Saunders (cricketer, born 1966), cricketer who played for the Turks and Caicos Islands
- Henry Saunders House, a historic home located near Windsor, Isle of Wight County, Virginia

== See also ==
- Harry Saunders (disambiguation)
- Hank Saunders, a character on the TV series Glee
- Henry Sanders (disambiguation)
