= P. A. Howells =

Philip Arthur Howells (c. 1855 – 24 August 1921) was a musical entrepreneur in South Australia.

== History ==
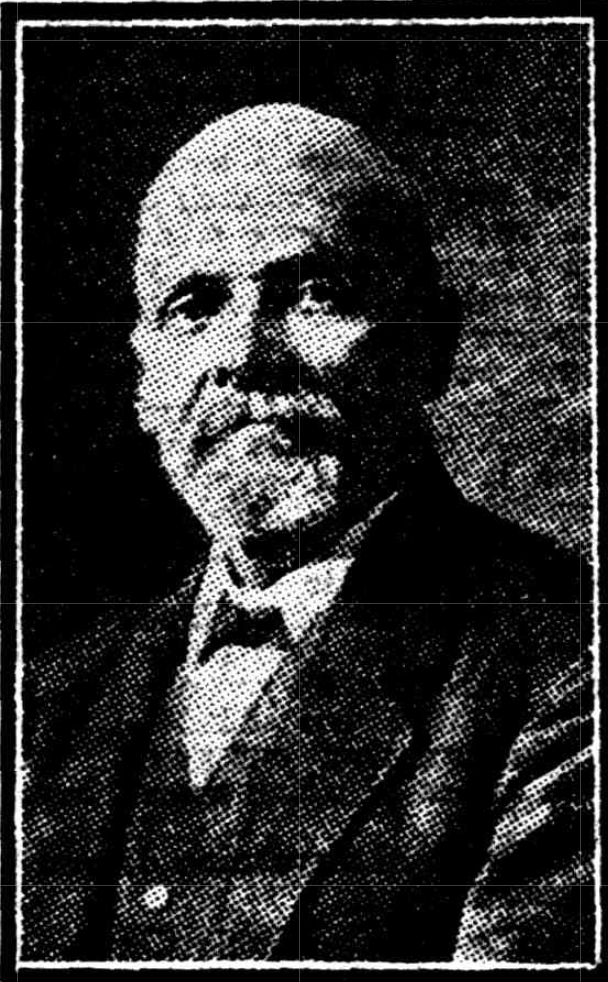
P. A. Howells

Howells was born in Croydon, Surrey, the eldest son of Philip Howells (c. 1828 – 21 October 1885) and Janetta Howells (c. 1825 – 20 July 1905), who emigrated to South Australia in 1855 and ran a timber business in Mount Barker. In later years they moved to Kilkenny, where both died.

Howells grew up in Mount Barker, working in his father's woodyard. In September 1868 he began working for Samuel Marshall, founder of the music warehouse, 52 Rundle Street, which later became S. Marshall & Sons.

He was in Marshall's employ until 1892, the last seven years as manager, when he left to work on his own account.

=== Otto Stange ===
He had considerable dealings with Otto Stange, a German pianist, reckoned by some to be pivotal in the cultural history of the colony. He taught piano in Adelaide from 1872 but had trouble attracting students. One such had reason to thank him: Gotthold Reimann, who founded the Adelaide College of Music, which became the Elder Conservatorium. Stange was secretary of the Adelaider Turnverein from 1873 and musical director of the Gesangverein Fidelitas Society from 1877. He was later a highly successful dealer in WA goldfields shares. Stange married Marie Hesse on 25 December 1875; she died at Baden Baden on 8 February 1891.

=== C. J. Stevens ===
Howells reckoned the event with the greatest impact on Adelaide music culture was the arrival of Charles Joseph Stevens, an orchestral and choral conductor from Birmingham. Howells helped Stevens found the Adelaide Musical Association in competition with the Philharmonic Society, led by Professor Ives. Stevens had a cousin in London, one W. H. Poole, whom they employed to seek out musicians of the highest calibre who might be persuaded to perform in Adelaide. Notable among those they brought out was the baritone Charles Santley, who came out in 1889. This was a huge gamble, as the expenses could only be cleared by charging unheard-of ticket prices (7/6 and 4/-) and by selling rights to promoters in the Eastern States and New Zealand. The tour was a triumph both musically and commercially, and Santley's Elijah became the standard by which other performances were judged.

=== Saturday "pops" ===
Howells was largely responsible for popular concerts at the Adelaide Town Hall sponsored by Marshall. The program, intended to be educational as well as entertaining, was inaugurated on (Tuesday) 5 April 1887, with the Adelaide Musical Association's production of Gounod's Redemption. The second, on (Monday) 11 July 1887 featured Gounod's Messe solennelle and Mendelssohn's overture to Athalie ([pm] Op. 74). The tradition of Saturday popular concerts at the Town Hall began a few years later:

- 21 June 1890: the first of the popular Saturday Night concerts featured Armes Beaumont, tenor, and T. H. Jones, organist.
- 28 June: artists included Gordon Gooch from Melbourne, Lucy Stevenson, and Minna Schrader.
- 12 July, on a military theme; Armes Beaumont and W. R. Pybus, proceeds were donated to the 3rd Battalion Athletic Hall Fund.
- 19 July: featured visiting UK organist Frank H. Bradley
- 26 July: return of Frank Bradley, and violinist Hermann Heinicke
- 2 August: Hermann Schrader from Melbourne, Adelaide Orpheus Society
- 9 August: Frank Bradley's farewell, Port Adelaide Musical Association
- 23 August: Orpheus Society, W. H. Poole, English basso
- 30 August: Henry Stockwell, Minna Schrader, Hans Bertram (piano), Jennie Opie

A request by H. R. Holder (Note: Herbert Reuben Holder (c. 1859 – 287 December 1915) was a brother of Sir Frederick Holder and a well-known musician, best known as a teacher of singing.) to waive fees for the last concert on account of mounting losses, was refused.

- 4 October 1890: benefit for Howells on account of the losses he had borne in producing the series.

The second season of ten concerts ran from 11 April to 15 August 1891, managed by Howells, and was so successful it was extended by another four Saturdays, 22 August to 12 September.

In May 1892 Howells left the firm of Marshall & Sons and founded his own business of P. A. Howells & Co., 53 Rundle Street, when he purchased the entire stock of sheet music and band instruments from the firm of Joseph Woodman & Co. (proprietor E. T. Collins) of 33 Rundle Street, who had decided to concentrate on pianos and organs.

The third season of "pops" ran from 7 May 1892 to 20 August. At some concerts a "house full" attendance of 1,385 was recorded at the Town Hall. The eighth concert was not so well attended, on account of inclement weather. Howells revealed that while the first series resulted in a loss and the second broke even, this series was a financial, as well as artistic, success, thanks largely to the appearance of Ada Crossley. Again, a supplementary series was organised, from 3 September 1892 to 23 September, this last being a Friday; every concert sold out.

The fourth season ran from 15 April 1893 to 22 July. The Register gave Howells credit for the success of the series, in persevering with the program when it was losing money, and for introducing notable performers and musical works to an audience who may have been previously unaware of their existence. Howells, who was praised for his tact and energy, was tendered a complimentary concert on 29 July by the musicians of Adelaide, and responded to by music lovers, who crowded the Town Hall "from floor to ceiling". Once again, Howells organised a supplementary series of four concerts, this time from Tuesday to Friday, 22 to 25 August 1893, and the artists were Howell's Melbourne company, which included Charles Saunders, Ada Crossley, Jeannie Ramsay, A. H. Gee and T. H. Jones.

The 1894 concerts saw the introduction of elocutionary recitals, but attendance at the first few was so poor that Howells terminated the series.

Artists introduced to the Adelaide public in those concerts include favorites Armes Beaumont, Ada Crossley, and Melbourne soprano Mrs Palmer (nee Rosina Carandini), as well as Gordon Gooch, organists Frank T. Bradley and Auguste Wiegand, Henry Stockwell (tenor), Beaumont Read, harpist W. T. Barker, flautist John Lemmone, Signor Buzzi, Bertha Kossow, Lalla Miranda, Agatha Miller, A. H. Gee, Florrie Simonsen, the cellist Theo Liebe, Jennie Ramsay, and tenor Charles Saunders.

Howells also had a prominent part in introducing the following artists to Australia: — Sir Charles Santley; Signor Fori, the great bass; Madame Antoinette Sterling, and the Belle Cole Concert Company. While that quartet was here, C. J. Stevens and Howells arranged for an oratorio festival in Sydney, Melbourne, and Adelaide, which was a huge success, musically and financially — the Exhibition Building in Adelaide was crowded at each of the four concerts. He also brought out Evangeline Florence (concert sopranos); Cyril Tyler (boy soprano); Marian McKenzie (contralto); Charlotte Thudiekers (soprano); Edward Branscombe, (tenor, later with the Westminster Glee Singers); and Mark Hambourg, the pianist.

Howells organised a chorus of 300 voices for Williamson & Musgrave to support Madam Albani in oratorio, and managed the concerts of Ignace Paderewski, E. H. Lemare the renowned organist; Auguste Wiegand, the Belgian organist; the Watkin Mills Concert Company; Hugo Heermann, the violinist: Blanche Arral, the Belgian soprano; and he also arranged concerts for most of the students who left for Europe to study music. He acted as musical director at the Chamber of Manufactures Exhibitions, and for a number of years was manager for Edward Branscombe's Dandies. He helped arrange Conservatorium concerts.

== Family ==
Philip Arthur Howells married Harriet Maria (Marie?) Newman (c. 1856 – 3 October 1939) on 25 November 1878 and had a home at Highbury Street, Prospect. Their family included

- Edith Howells married Herbert Edward Annells on 28 July, 1906, of Unley
- Ruby Howells married James Stafford on 25 June 1927, of Quorn
- Hilda Howells married George Hartley Dall on 22 November 1919, of Clarence Park
- Dora Howells married Howard Stanley Sloman on 7 December 1921, of Medindie
