= Frederick Saunders =

Frederick Saunders may refer to:

- Frederick Saunders (librarian) (1807–1902), English-born American librarian
- Frederick Albert Saunders (1875–1963), Canadian-born American physicist
- Frederick Richard Saunders (1838–1910), British colonial administrator in Ceylon
- Frederick Saunders (civil servant) (c. 1804–1870), British colonial administrator in Ceylon
- Fred Saunders (born 1951), American basketball player
