= Ed Saunders =

Ed Saunders may refer to:

- Ed Saunders, character in Rawhide (1938 film)
- Ed Saunders, character in Black Like Me (film)

== See also ==
- Edward Saunders (disambiguation)
