= Windsor, Virginia =

- Town
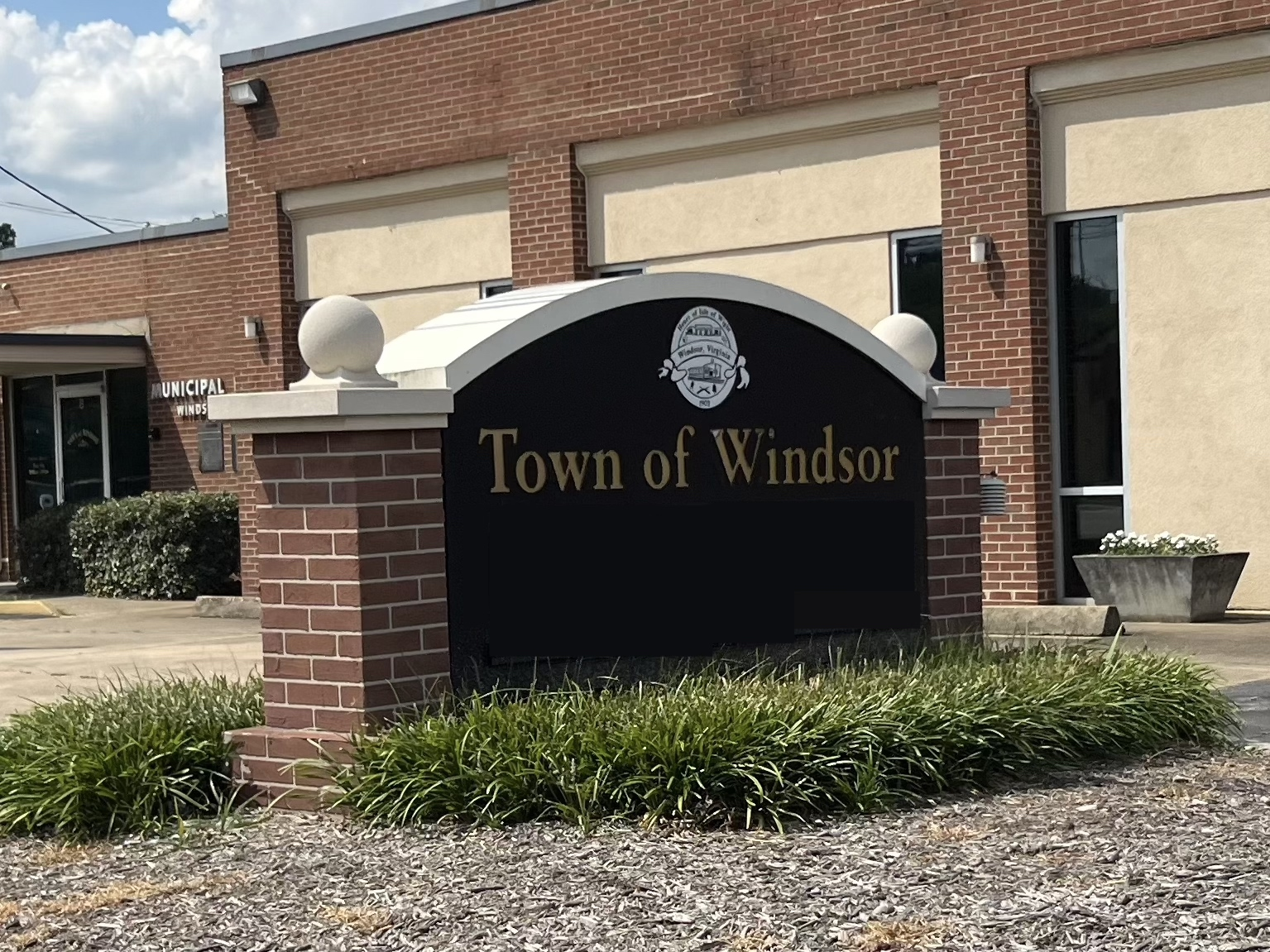

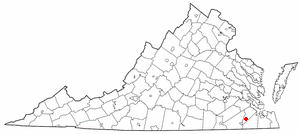
- Location in Virginia
- Coordinates: 36°48′40″N 76°44′37″W
- Country: United States
- State: Virginia
- County: Isle of Wight
- Founded: 1902

Area
  - Total: 4.03 sq mi (10.44 km^{2})
  - Land: 4.01 sq mi (10.39 km^{2})
  - Water: 0.015 sq mi (0.04 km^{2})
- Elevation: 79 ft (24 m)

Population (2020)
  - Total: 2,746
  - Estimate (2019): 2,758
  - Density: 687.4/sq mi (265.39/km^{2})
- Time zone: UTC−5 (Eastern (EST))
  - Summer (DST): UTC−4 (EDT)
- ZIP code: 23487
- Area codes: 757, 948
- FIPS code: 51-86784
- GNIS feature ID: 1500328
- Website: www.windsor-va.gov

Windsor is an incorporated town in Isle of Wight County in the Hampton Roads region of southeastern Virginia, United States. It is located near the crossroads of U.S. routes 460 and 258. As of the 2020 census, Windsor had a population of 2,746.

== History ==
Windsor was established next to the Norfolk Southern Corporation's railroad. The town of Windsor was chartered on March 15, 1902. Windsor established a volunteer fire department in 1947 and its police department in 1990. In 2001, the town annexed 2.8 square miles (7.3 km^{2}) of Isle of Wight County, which nearly tripled its population.

The Henry Saunders House and William Scott Farmstead are listed on the National Register of Historic Places.

In 2021, it was reported that Windsor had developed a reputation for ticketing and fining passing motorists. Nearly 10 percent of the town's local revenue comes from traffic fines. The town obtained national media coverage when a Windsor police officer stopped and pepper-sprayed Lt. Caron Nazario, a Black Hispanic male driving through Windsor. As a result of the Nazario incident, the Attorney General of Virginia filed suit against Windsor for its "pattern of unconstitutional and discriminatory policing" in December 2021. On September 7, 2023, Windsor signed a settlement with the state that included independent reviews of misconduct allegations against its police force, additional training for its law enforcement officers, and a commitment to continue seeking Virginia Law Enforcement Professional Standards Commission accreditation.

== Geography ==
Windsor is located in southern Isle of Wight County. U.S. Route 460 passes through the center of town, leading southeast 11 miles (18 km) to Suffolk and northwest 47 miles (76 km) to Petersburg. Norfolk is 29 miles (47 km) east of Windsor via US-460 and U.S. Route 58. U.S. Route 258 crosses US-460 on the western side of Windsor, leading north 15 miles (24 km) to Smithfield and southwest the same distance to Franklin.

According to the United States Census Bureau, Windsor has a total area of 4.0 square miles (10.4 km^{2}), of which 0.02 square miles (0.04 km^{2}), or 0.41%, are water.

== Demographics ==
Historical population
Census	Pop.	Note	%±
1880	266		—
1910	328		—
1920	326		−0.6%
1930	371		13.8%
1940	411		10.8%
1950	451		9.7%
1960	579		28.4%
1970	685		18.3%
1980	985		43.8%
1990	1,025		4.1%
2000	916		−10.6%
2010	2,626		186.7%
2020	2,746		4.6%
U.S. Decennial Census

As of the census of 2000, there were 916 people, 389 households, and 269 families residing in the town. The population density was 1,077.2 people per square mile (416.1/km^{2}). There were 422 housing units at an average density of 496.3 per square mile (191.7/km^{2}). The racial makeup of the town was 89.74% White, 9.06% African American, 0.44% Native American, and 0.76% from two or more races. Hispanic or Latino of any race were 0.98% of the population.

There were 389 households, out of which 30.6% had children under the age of 18 living with them, 52.4% were married couples living together, 12.6% had a female householder with no husband present, and 30.6% were non-families. 27.5% of all households were made up of individuals, and 11.3% had someone living alone who was 65 years of age or older. The average household size was 2.35 and the average family size was 2.87.

In the town, the population was spread out, with 23.8% under the age of 18, 7.4% from 18 to 24, 29.0% from 25 to 44, 27.3% from 45 to 64, and 12.4% who were 65 years of age or older. The median age was 38 years. For every 100 females, there were 88.5 males. For every 100 females aged 18 and over, there were 84.7 males.

The median income for a household in the town was $36,528, and the median income for a family was $44,167. Males had a median income of $34,205 versus $25,000 for females. The per capita income for the town was $20,999. About 5.9% of families and 8.8% of the population were below the poverty line, including 13.4% of those under age 18 and 8.2% of those age 65 or over.

== Education ==
Windsor Elementary School serves students in grades of Pre-K through 5. The school mascot is the hornet, and for the 2010 – 2011 school year had a total enrollment of 613 students.

Georgie D. Tyler Middle School serves students in grades 6 through 8 and the Titan is the school mascot. The school colors are blue and silver. The school used to be called Windsor Middle School. During Windsor Middle School's 2010 – 2011 school year yielded a total enrollment of 328 students. Georgie D Tyler Middle School opened in late summer of 2014.

Windsor High School serves students in grades 9 through 12. The school colors are royal blue and gold, and the mascot is the Dukes. There were 501 students enrolled during the 2010 – 2011 school year. The school supports teams in baseball, basketball, cheerleading, football, marching band, golf, soccer, softball, track, tennis, wrestling and volleyball, theatre, forensics, and academic bowl.
