= Ben Saunders =

Ben or Benjamin Saunders may refer to:

== Sports ==
- Ben Saunders (Australian footballer) (born 1991), Australian rules footballer
- Ben Saunders (English footballer) (born 1984), English footballer
- Ben Saunders (fighter) (born 1983), American mixed martial artist

== Others ==
- Ben Saunders (professor) (born 1968), British comics expert
- Ben Saunders (explorer) (born 1977), British polar explorer, endurance athlete, and motivational speaker
- Ben Saunders (singer) (1983–2026), Dutch winner of season 1 of The Voice of Holland
- Ben Saunders (Holby City), a character in Holby City
