= David Saunders =

David Saunders may refer to:

- David Saunders (American football player) (born 1976), American football player
- David Saunders (American football coach) (born 1958), assistant football coach at the University of Louisiana-Lafayette
- David Saunders (architect) (1928–1986), Australian architect and academic, taught at the Tin Sheds in Sydney in the 1970s
- David Saunders (artist), (born 1936) English artist
- David Saunders (psychologist) (born 1956), dean of the Smith School of Business from 2003 to 2019
- David Saunders (ice hockey) (born 1966), Canadian ice hockey player
- David Saunders (political strategist), Democratic political strategist and author
- Dave Saunders (volleyball) (born 1960), American former volleyball player
- David J. Saunders (1811–1873), Virginia businessman and politician
