= Ted Saunders =

Ted Saunders may refer to:

- Ted Saunders (musician), on Living Time
- Ted Saunders (ice hockey)
- Ted Saunders, character in Akeelah and the Bee played by Craig Wasson

== See also ==
- Edward Saunders (disambiguation)
- Theodore Saunders, musician
