= Thomas Saunders =

Thomas Saunders may refer to:

== Politicians ==
- Thomas Saunders (MP for Devon), English MP for Devon, 1653–1659
- Thomas Saunders (MP for Coventry), English MP for Coventry
- Thomas Saunders (died 1565) (1513–1565), English MP for Gatton, Reigate and Surrey
- Thomas Saunders (born 1593), English MP for Buckinghamshire
- Thomas Saunders (born 1626) (1626–1670), English MP for Wallingford
- Thomas Saunders (born 1641), English MP for Milborne Port
- Thomas E. Saunders (born 1951), member of the Indiana House of Representatives

== Others ==
- Thomas Saunders (colonel), co-author of the Petition of the three colonels of 1654
- Thomas Saunders (governor) (1713–1775), British governor of Madras from 1750 till 1755
- Thomas Harry Saunders (1813–1870), known as T. H. Saunders, British paper-maker known especially for his watermarks
- Thomas William Saunders (1814–1890), British metropolitan police magistrate
- Thomas Saunders (academic), Vice-Chancellor of Oxford University
- Thomas A. Saunders III (1936–2022), American investment banker and philanthropist
