= William Scott Farmstead =

Historic house in Virginia, United States

- U.S. National Register of Historic Places
- Virginia Landmarks Register
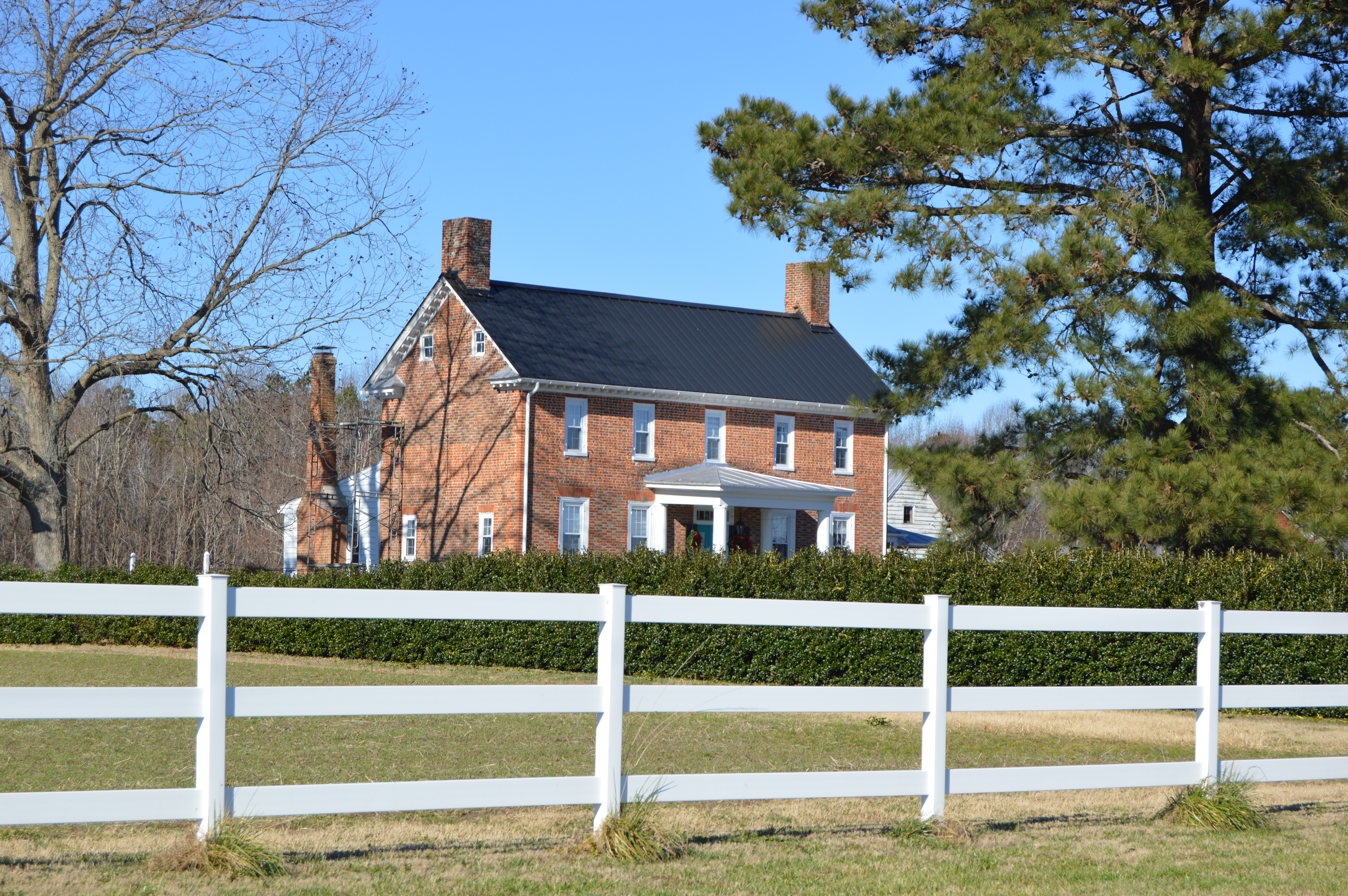
- Front and southern side

- Location within Virginia Location within the United States
- Location: VA 603 E of jct. with VA 600, near Windsor, Virginia
- Coordinates: 36°48′49″N 76°42′29″W
- Area: 3.3 acres (1.3 ha)
- Built: c. 1775
- Architectural style: Georgian, Federal
- NRHP reference No.: 90002194
- VLR No.: 046-0086

Significant dates
- Added to NRHP: January 25, 1991
- Designated VLR: April 17, 1990

William Scott Farmstead, also known as the Roberts House and Ennis Pond House, is a historic home located near Windsor, Isle of Wight County, Virginia. The house was built about 1775, and is a two-story, five-bay, gable roofed brick dwelling. It has a rear frame addition dated to the mid- to late-19th century. The front facade features a pedimented one bay porch supported by Doric order columns. The interior retains much of its early Federal interior woodwork. Also on the property are the contributing servants' quarters, smokehouse, barn, and corn crib.

It was listed on the National Register of Historic Places in 1991.
