= Philip Saunders =

Philip Saunders may refer to:

- Flip Saunders (1955–2015), American former basketball head coach
- Philip Saunders (cricketer) (born 1929), Australian-born cricketer
- Philip Saunders (philatelist) (1899–1975), British banker and philatelist
- Philip or Phillip Saunders, murder victim in the case of the Cardiff Newsagent Three
