= Henry Sanders =

Henry Sanders may refer to:

- Henry Sanders (historian) (1727–1785), English antiquarian
- Henry Sanders (politician) (born 1942), Democratic member of the Alabama Senate
- Henry G. Sanders (born 1942), American actor
- Henry Russell Sanders (1905–1958), American college football player and coach
- Henry Sanders (priest) (1807–1888), Church of England priest
- Henry Armytage Sanders (1886–1936), New Zealand war photographer and cinematographer

== See also ==
- Henry Frederick Conrad Sander (1847–1920), orchidologist and nurseryman
- Hank Sanders (Oregon politician), member of the Oregon House of Representatives
- Henry Saunders (disambiguation)
