= Harold Saunders =

Harold Saunders may refer to:

- Harold Saunders (chess player) (1875–1950), British chess and bridge player
- Harold E. Saunders (1890–1961), American hydrodynamicist
- Harold H. Saunders (1930–2016), United States Assistant Secretary of State for Near East Affairs

== See also ==
- Harry Saunders (disambiguation)
