= Mors et vita =

Oratorio in three parts by Charles Gounod

Mors et vita is an oratorio in three parts by Charles Gounod that premiered at the Birmingham Festival in 1885. It was conceived as a sequel to La rédemption (1882). The 1886 Paris premiere again featured Jean-Baptiste Faure. Gounod considered this oratorio, and its predecessor La rédemption (1882) as his greatest achievements.

== Recordings ==
- Michel Plasson EMI
