= Murray Sargent =

Australian cricketer

Personal information
- Full name: Murray Alfred James Sargent
- Born: 23 August 1928; North Adelaide, South Australia
- Died: 28 February 2012 (aged 83); Sanctuary Cove, Queensland
- Batting: Right-handed
- Bowling: Right-arm legbreak/medium pace
- Role: Batsman

Domestic team information
- Years: Team
- 1951–52: Leicestershire
- 1960/61: South Australia
- First-class debut: 9 June 1951 Leicestershire v Oxford University
- Last First-class: 7 February 1961 South Australia v New South Wales

Career statistics
| Competition | First-class |
|---|---|
| Matches | 22 |
| Runs scored | 804 |
| Batting average | 23.64 |
| 100s/50s | 1/4 |
| Top score | 164 |
| Balls bowled | 352 |
| Wickets | 3 |
| Bowling average | 68.00 |
| 5 wickets in innings | – |
| 10 wickets in match | – |
| Best bowling | 2/18 |
| Catches/stumpings | 5/– |
- Source: CricketArchive, 9 October 2013

Murray Alfred James Sargent (23 August 1928 – 28 February 2012) was an Australian cricketer who played as a right-handed batsman, often used as an opener, and an occasional leg-spin or medium pace bowler. He played first-class cricket for Leicestershire in 1951 and 1952, and then played a single successful season for South Australia in 1960/61. He was born in North Adelaide, South Australia and died at Sanctuary Cove, Queensland.

Sargent was recruited in 1951 for Leicestershire in English cricket alongside another young South Australian club cricketer, Philip Saunders, by the captain and secretary Charles Palmer; Leicestershire already had two prominent Australian cricketers in Jack Walsh and Vic Jackson. His first innings in first-class cricket, in the match against a weak Oxford University side, was a promising 52. But he never achieved such heights again for Leicestershire and in 11 matches in 1952 his highest score was just 29, he often batted at No 8, and he did not bowl at all.

After his dalliance with first-class cricket in England, Sargent returned to club cricket with Glenelg Cricket Club in South Australia, with which he was associated for 20 years as a player. He returned for first-class cricket in only one season: in 1960/61, he played nine matches for South Australia as the opening partner for Les Favell. In the second innings of his first game, he hit 82, higher than he had managed in any of his previous first-class endeavours. Later in the season, he made 164 in the match against Queensland at Brisbane, sharing a 213-run partnership for the fourth wicket with Bob Lloyd which remains a South Australian record in first-class matches against Queensland. In the season as a whole he scored 564 runs at an average of 33.17. But he did not play first-class cricket again.

After his retirement from club cricket at Glenelg, he was a state selector for the South Australia team.
