= Charles Saunders =

Charles Saunders may refer to:

- Charles Saunders (Royal Navy officer) (1713–1775), British admiral
- Charles Saunders (colonial administrator) (1857–1931), British administrator
- Charles Saunders (tennis) (1861–?), real tennis world champion, 1890–1895
- Charles Saunders (director) (1904–1997), English film director and screenwriter
- Charles Saunders (rower) (1902–1994), New Zealand rower
- Charles Saunders (tenor) (1867–1917), English tenor in Australia
- Charles E. Saunders (1867–1937), Canadian agronomist
- Charles H. Saunders (1821–1901), city councilor, alderman and mayor of Cambridge, Massachusetts
- Charles R. Saunders (1946–2020), Canadian fantasy author
- Charles Saunders (bishop) (1884–1973), bishop of Lucknow, 1928–1938
- Charles Richard Saunders (1902–1981), American chemist
- Cathal Ó Sándair (1922–1996), Irish language author
- Charles Willard Saunders, American architect and partner at Saunders and Lawton
