= Joseph Saunders =

Joseph Saunders may refer to:

- Joseph Saunders (chief executive), executive chairman and former CEO of Visa Inc.
- Joseph Saunders (engraver) (1773–1853), engraver, illustrator, publisher and professor of fine art
- Joe Saunders (born 1981), American baseball pitcher
- Joe Saunders (politician) (born 1983), member of the Florida House of Representatives
