= Charles Saunders (tenor) =

English tenor (1867–1917)

Charles Saunders (1867–1917) was an English tenor with a brief but illustrious career in Australia.

== History ==
Saunders was born at Stratton, Cornwall, in 1867, and was found to possess a pure high treble voice, and was a welcome addition to various choirs. Remarkably, his voice never "broke", but developed into a fine tenor. In 1885 he moved to London and began studying with T. A. Wallworth at the Guildhall School of Music, and he made his first concert in October 1885. The following July he gained a Corporation exhibition, which enabled him to continue his studies.

He was a tenor soloist with the Chapel Royal choir, Hampton Court Palace, from September 1889 to July 1891. He took the principal role in the opera Fra Diavolo with the Carl Rosa Opera Company, and was offered the position of manager of that company, but unaccountably lost his voice, so after being prescribed a "long sea voyage" by his physician left for Australia aboard SS Port Pirie in April 1893. By the time he arrived at Melbourne the condition had cleared, so he booked a return passage. In the meantime he was signed up by J. C. Williamson's to appear in a variety of roles, operatic, oratorio, or ballet music, and even comedy.

He made his Australian debut at a series of concerts beginning 22 August 1893 in Adelaide arranged by P. A. Howells, followed by triumphs in the Eastern States of Australia, and New Zealand.

Saunders, who weighed around 23 stone (320 lb; 150 kg) died in early September 1917.
