= Harry Saunders (disambiguation) =

Harry Saunders (1898–1930) was a footballer.

Harry Saunders may also refer to:

- Harry Saunders (priest) (1913–1967), Archdeacon of Macclesfield
- Harry Saunders (economist), see Khazzoom–Brookes postulate
- Harry Saunders, inspiration for Harry's War

== See also ==
- Henry Saunders (disambiguation)
- Harold Saunders (disambiguation)
