= Raymond Saunders =

Raymond or Ray Saunders may refer to:

- Raymond Saunders (artist) (1934–2025), American artist
- Raymond Saunders (clockmaker) (1940–2024), Canadian clockmaker
- Ray Saunders (American football), college football player
