= Hugh Saunders =

Hugh Saunders may refer to:

- Hugh Saunders (RAF officer) (1894–1987), South African aviator and Royal Air Force officer
- Hugh Saunders (academic) (died 1537), English clergyman and academic
- Hugh Saunders (speedway rider) (born 1944), English speedway rider
