= Birmingham Triennial Music Festival =

Longest-running classical music festival (1784–1912)

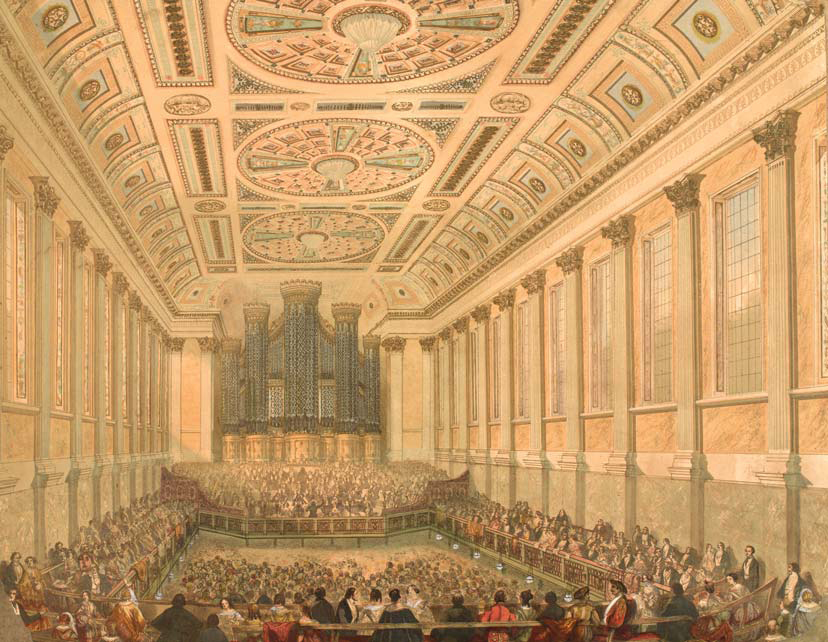
Birmingham Triennial Music Festival, Town Hall 1845

The Birmingham Triennial Musical Festival, in Birmingham, England, founded in 1784, was the longest-running classical music festival of its kind. It last took place in 1912.

== History ==
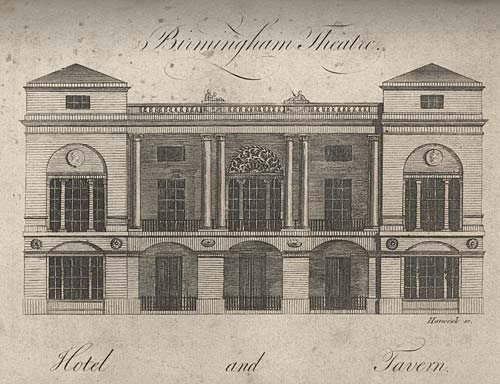
The Theatre Royal Birmingham in 1780

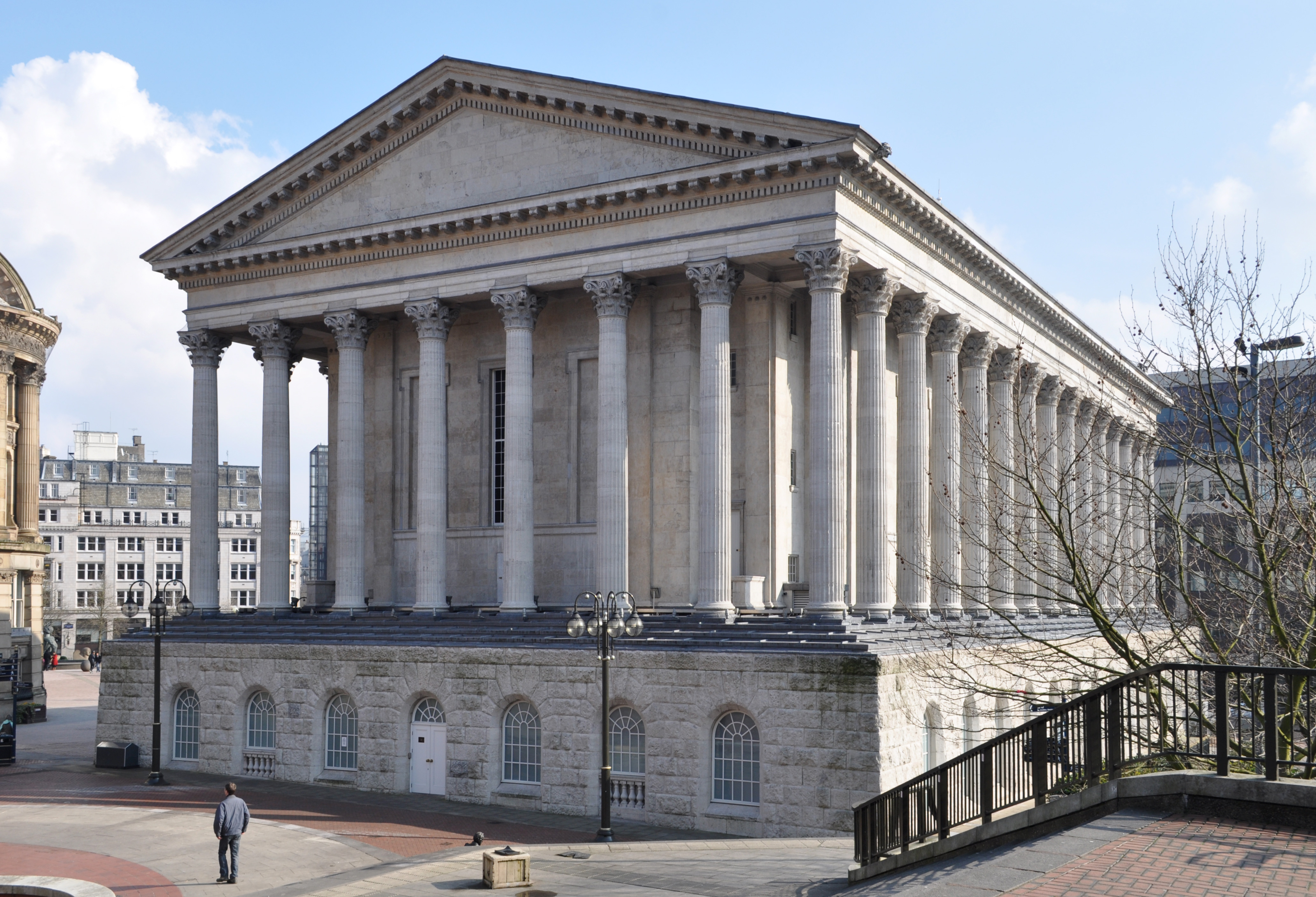
Birmingham Town Hall

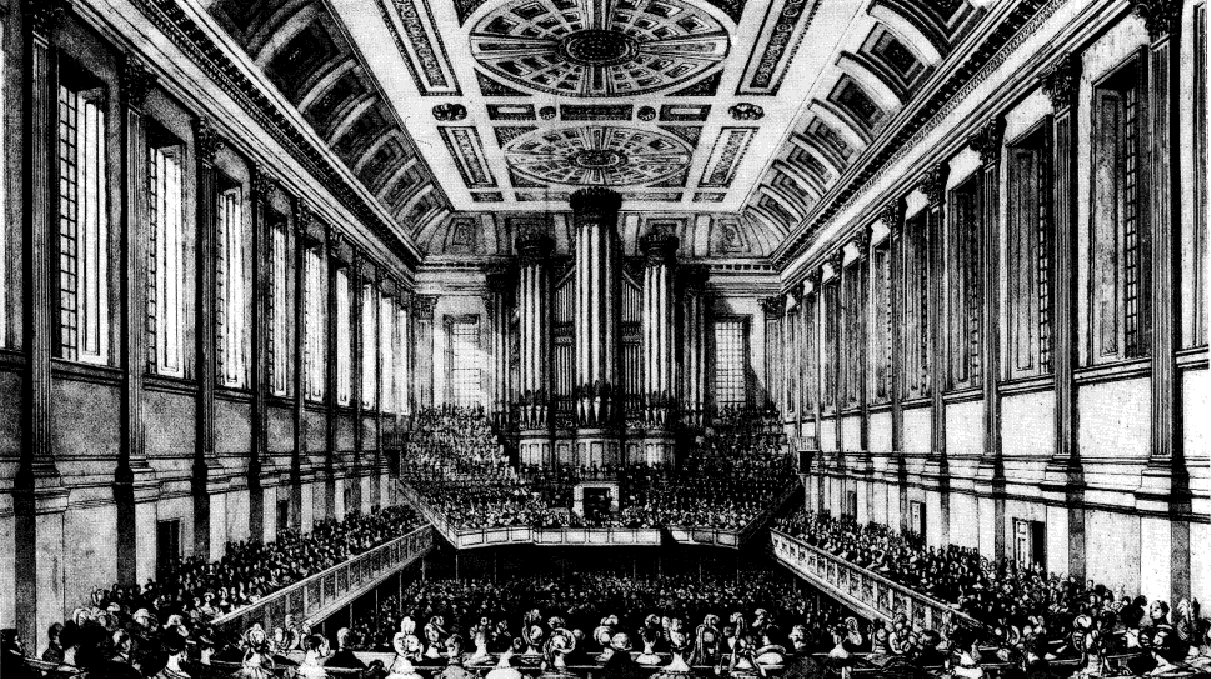
Birmingham Triennial Music Festival, Town Hall 1834

The first music festival, over three days in September 1768, was to help raise funds to complete the new General Hospital on Summer Lane. It proved to be very popular and successful, but it took another event in 1778 to achieve the funds required. The hospital opened September 1779.

From September 1784 the performances became a permanent feature and ran every three years, becoming the Birmingham Triennial Musical Festival, still with the aim of raising funds for the hospital.

Originally hosted in St Philip's Church (later to become the city's cathedral) or the Theatre Royal on New Street the available venues became too small for the festival. As a result, the Birmingham Town Hall was built, and opened in 1834 to house it. The festival for 1832 was delayed by two years during its erection.

Vocal works were generally sung in English. Hans Richter was appointed principal conductor in 1885.

== Mendelssohn ==
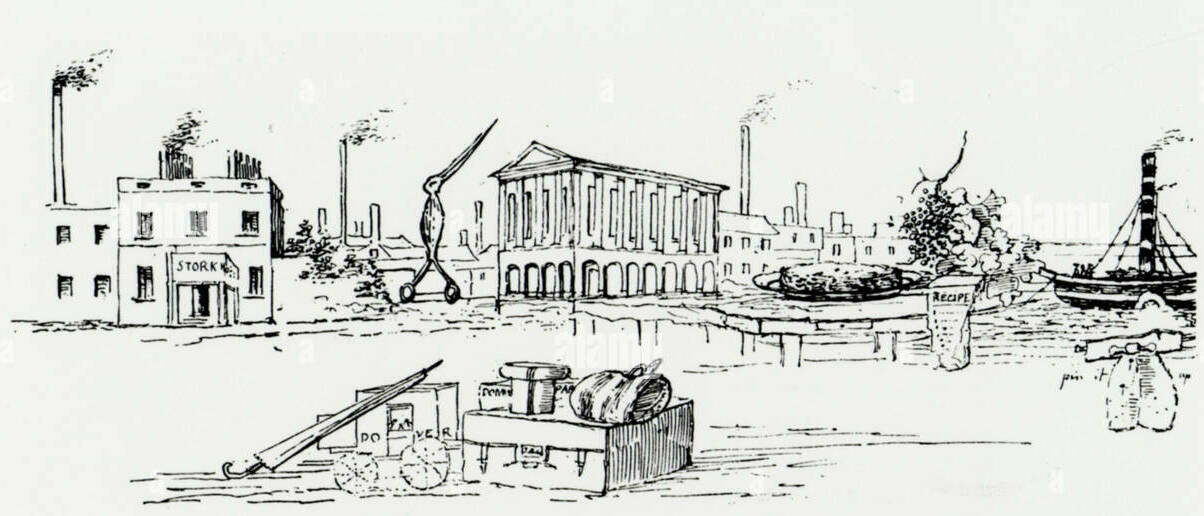
Mendelssohn's 1840 sketch, showing scenes from Birmingham, including the Town Hall (top centre), and Dover

In 1837 Felix Mendelssohn conducted a performance of his St. Paul oratorio, played the organ, and played the piano part in the premiere of his second Piano Concerto, specially commissioned by the Festival. He appeared in the following festival, playing his first Piano Concerto. During that visit, he made a pen and ink sketch of the Town Hall.

For the 1846 festival he composed and conducted the premiere of his oratorio Elijah, another new work commissioned by the Festival. He was paid 200 guineas. Elijah was played at every successive festival. Mendelssohn died a year later.

The Birmingham Festival Choral Society (still extant, in 2021) was founded in 1845, for the purpose of providing the chorus for the festivals, and sang at the premiere of Elijah.

== Commissions ==
Sullivan’s The Light of the World, premiere 1873

In 1873 the Festival commissioned Arthur Sullivan who composed his oratorio The Light of the World.

The 1879 Festival commissioned a work from Max Bruch, Das Lied von der Glocke.

In 1882 Charles Gounod was commissioned and produced Redemption, which was performed twice.

In 1885 Antonín Dvořák provided The Spectre's Bride and Gounod provided Mors et Vita.

In 1891 Dvořák's commission delivered his Requiem for £650.

1900 saw the commission The Dream of Gerontius from Edward Elgar. The chorus master, Charles Swinnerton Heap had died suddenly four months before the concert was due, and with ten works in hand and only one copy of the score, rehearsal started only a few days before the performance date. It was not sung well but was strongly applauded and well reviewed as a composition. Elgar returned in 1903 with The Apostles, and 1906 with The Kingdom. His commission for 1912 created The Music Makers, incorporating themes from the Enigma Variations, Gerontius, his violin concerto, and The Apostles. The principal conductor for 1912 was Henry Wood.

== The end ==
The 1909 and 1912 festivals ran at a loss, providing no donation to the General Hospital. World War I marked the end of the Triennial Festivals.

== See also ==
- George Barker (benefactor) - long-standing chairman of the festival committee, until 1843
- List of oratorios

== Sources ==
- The Music Makers - a Brief History of the Birmingham Triennial Music Festivals 1784 - 1912, Anne Elliott, Birmingham City Council, ISBN 0-7093-0224-X
- All About Victoria Square, Joe Holyoak, The Victorian Society Birmingham Group, ISBN 0-901657-14-X
- A History of Birmingham, Chris Upton, 1993, ISBN 0-85033-870-0
