= Harold Saunders (chess player) =

British chess master and bridge player

Personal information
- Full name: Harold Saunders
- Born: 4 September 1874 Montreal
- Died: 13 July 1950

Chess career
- Country: England

Harold Saunders (4 September 1874 – 13 July 1950) was a British chess master and bridge player.

== Tournament results ==
Saunders took 2nd, behind Sir George Thomas, at London 1913, took 4th at Cheltenham 1913 (Frederick Yates won), tied for 7–8th at Hastings 1919 (Minor, E.G. Sergeant won), tied for 5–7th at Hastings 1924/25 (Section B ), took 5th at Edinburgh 1926 (Yates won), and shared 3rd, behind Victor Buerger and Yates, at London 1926.

Saunders' best results occurred in Scarborough, where he tied for first with Edgard Colle in Section B but lost their individual game, and then lost a play-off match to Thomas (0–2) for 3rd prize, so finally taking 4th place there. The event was won by Alexander Alekhine. He took 9th in 1927 (Colle won), tied for 4–6th in 1928 (William Winter won), and shared 1st with Savielly Tartakower in 1929.

In 1932, he took 12th in British Chess Championship in London (Mir Sultan Khan won).

== Notable game ==
Position: a8 black rook, b8 black knight, f8 black rook, g8 black king, a7 black pawn, b7 black pawn, e7 black bishop, h7 black pawn, b6 black queen, d6 black pawn, g6 black pawn, c5 black pawn, d5 white pawn, e4 white knight, f4 white bishop, a2 white pawn, b2 white pawn, c2 white pawn, d2 white queen, g2 white pawn, h2 white pawn, a1 white rook, f1 white rook, g1 white king

Position after 14...Qb6

Harold Saunders vs. Savielly Tartakower, Scarborough 1929:
1.d4 c5 2.d5 d6 3.e4 e5 4.Bd3 Be7 5.Ne2 g6 6.0-0 f5 7.f4 fxe4 8.Bxe4 Nf6 9.Nbc3 Nxe4 10.Nxe4 exf4 11.Bxf4 0-0 12.Qd2 Bf5 13.N2g3 Bxe4 14.Nxe4 Qb6 (see diagram) 15.Bg5 Qd8 16.Rxf8+ Qxf8 17.Rf1 Qe8 18.Qe2 Nd7 19.Bxe7 Qxe7 20.Nf6+ Qxf6 21.Rxf6 Nxf6 22.Qe6+ Kg7 23.Qe7+ 1–0
