= Peter Saunders =

Peter Saunders may refer to:

- Peter Saunders (Australian academic) (born 1948), Australian social researcher
- Peter Saunders (British sociologist) (born 1950), British sociologist
- Peter Saunders (impresario) (1911–2003), English theatre impresario
- Pete Saunders (born 1960), musician
