= Ben Saunders (English footballer) =

English footballer

Personal information
- Date of birth: 12 October 1984 (age 42)
- Place of birth: Nottingham, England
- Position: Forward

Team information
- Current team: Coalville Town

Senior career*
Years	Team	Apps	(Gls)
2004–2005	Southwell City		
2005–2006	Doncaster Rovers	0	(0)
2005	→ Worksop Town (loan)		
2006	→ Bury (loan)	1	(0)
2006–2008	Hucknall Town		
2008–2009	Shepshed Dynamo		
2009–2013	Grantham Town		
2013	Stamford		
2013–	Coalville Town		
- * Club domestic league appearances and goals

Ben Saunders (born 12 October 1984) is an English footballer who plays for Coalville Town.

== Career ==
Saunders was born in Nottingham and played amateur football for Central Midlands League side Southwell City before joining Doncaster Rovers in August 2005. He joined Worksop Town on loan and then Bury where he played one match in the Football League which came in a 4–1 defeat away at Peterborough United. Saunders was then released by Doncaster and he dropped into non-league football playing for Hucknall Town, Shepshed Dynamo, Grantham Town, Stamford and Coalville Town.
