= Edward Saunders =

Edward Saunders may refer to:

- Edward W. Saunders (1860–1921), Virginian politician
- Edward Saunders (judge) (died 1576), British judge
- Edward Saunders (entomologist) (1848–1910), British entomologist
- Edward Saunders (MP) for Coventry (UK Parliament constituency)

== See also ==
- Ed Saunders (disambiguation)
- Ted Saunders (disambiguation)
