= Kameron Saunders =

American dancer, choreographer, and creative director

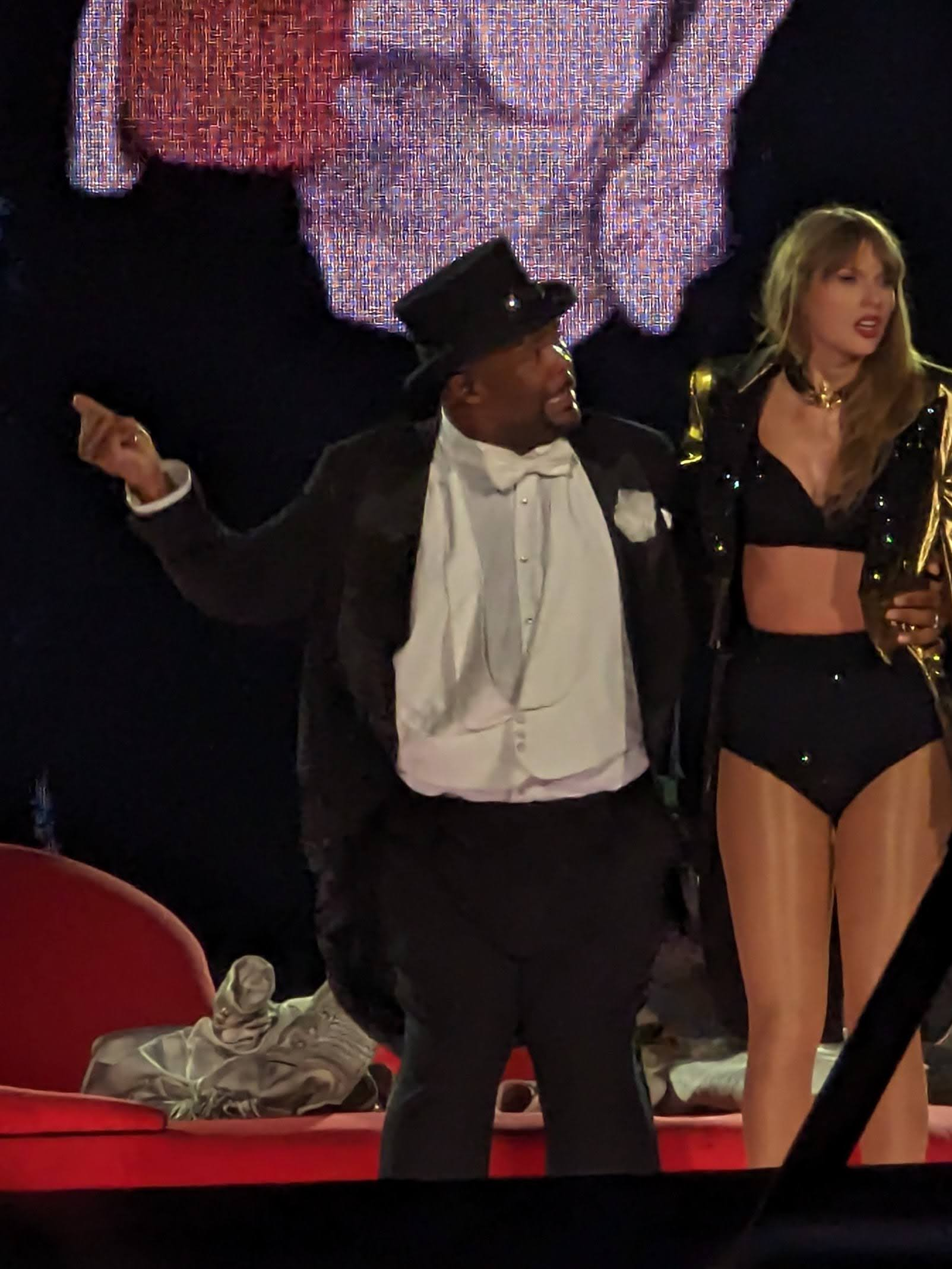
- Saunders (left) performing in 2024, with Taylor Swift (right)
- Born: July 23, 1992 (age 34); St. Louis, Missouri, US
- Education: University of Missouri–Kansas City (BFA, 2014)
- Occupations: Dancer, choreographer, and creative director
- Notable work: Spirited (2022), The Color Purple (2023), The Eras Tour (2023–2024)
- Relatives: Khalen Saunders (brother)

Kameron N. Saunders (born July 23, 1992) is an American dancer. He is known for his work in Spirited (2022), Saucy Santana's "Booty" music video (2022), The Color Purple (2023), and The Eras Tour (2023–2024).

== Early life and education ==
Saunders was born and raised in St. Louis, attending Metro Academic and Classical High School, and became interested in dance as a child. He attended the Center of Creative Arts on scholarship and joined the school's student dance company, COCADance. Following graduation, he studied dance for two years at Webster University before transferring to the University of Missouri–Kansas City's Conservatory of Music and Dance, where he received a Bachelor of Fine Arts in 2014.

== Career ==
=== Choreographer ===
Saunders began his career as a dance teacher and freelance choreographer in St. Louis. In 2018, he received a choreography fellowship from Jacob's Pillow, through which he was mentored by American dancer and choreographer Alonzo King. The following year, he moved to New York City, where he worked with dance studios such as Gibney Dance and Broadway Dance Center. In 2020, he served as the movement director for Burberry x Vogue's "If I Was An Animal" creative campaign.

During the COVID-19 pandemic, Saunders started the K/P Project with his business partner Prince Lyons, with the goal of "creating performance opportunities for artists/dancers that are often overlooked".

Saunders was a finalist for the Princess Grace Award in Choreography in 2021 and won the award the following year. He has also received a Passion Project Grant from the Jaquel Knight Foundation. In 2023, Saunders was a choreographer for the Joffrey Academy of Dance's Winning Works Choreographic Competition, the only school and training program owned, operated, and endorsed by the Joffrey Ballet. His work, "Warmer", premiered at the Museum of Contemporary Art Chicago.

=== Dancer ===
In 2021, Saunders was a principal dancer in the 2022 American holiday film Spirited, where he worked alongside Ryan Reynolds, Octavia Spencer, and Will Ferrell. The following year, he was a principal dancer in the 2023 American film The Color Purple, where he worked alongside Fantasia Barrino, Taraji P. Henson, Danielle Brooks, and Colman Domingo. Also in 2022, Saunders was a backup dancer for Lizzo's BET Awards.

In December of that year, Saunders was selected to be one of 15 backup dancers for Taylor Swift's The Eras Tour, touring globally with the artist from March 2023 to December 2024. He has a dance solo in the song "Bejeweled" and is the only dancer to have spoken lines in the choreography. In "We Are Never Ever Getting Back Together" Saunders exclaims "like ever!" at the end of the bridge. While performing internationally, Saunders learned local dialects and slang to state the phrase or something similar, including using Singlish slang with an "impeccable accent" while in Singapore, which garnered him praise among fans. After the addition of a set dedicated to The Tortured Poets Department, Saunders counts from 1 to 4 at the end of the second verse in "I Can Do It with a Broken Heart". However, similarly to his line in "We Are Never Ever Getting Back Together", the counting is often done in the local language.

In February 2025, Saunders was a dancer for Chappell Roan's performance of "Pink Pony Club" at the 67th Annual Grammy Awards.

== Legacy ==
On January 25, 2024, the Kansas City government named January 25 the "Kameron Saunders Day of Dance" to recognize Saunders's achievements. Kansas City Councilman Eric Bunch highlighted how "Kameron is a fierce advocate for broader representation and inclusion within the performing arts industry".

== Personal life ==
Saunders is a member of the LGBTQ+ community. Throughout his childhood, Saunders received negative comments about his body from dance instructors and audition directors because of his weight. Saunders's brother, Khalen Saunders, is an American football player who has played in the National Football League for the Kansas City Chiefs and New Orleans Saints. One of Khalen Saunders' former teammates, Travis Kelce, performed alongside Kameron Saunders during a 2024 Eras Tour performance in London.
