= Henry Saunders (cricketer, born 1883) =

English cricketer

Henry William Saunders (1883 – 24 April 1942) played first-class cricket for Somerset in four matches in four different cricket seasons from 1911 to 1922. His exact date and place of birth are not known; he died at Uphill, Weston-super-Mare, Somerset.
