= Henry Saunders House =

Historic house in Virginia, US

- U.S. National Register of Historic Places
- Virginia Landmarks Register
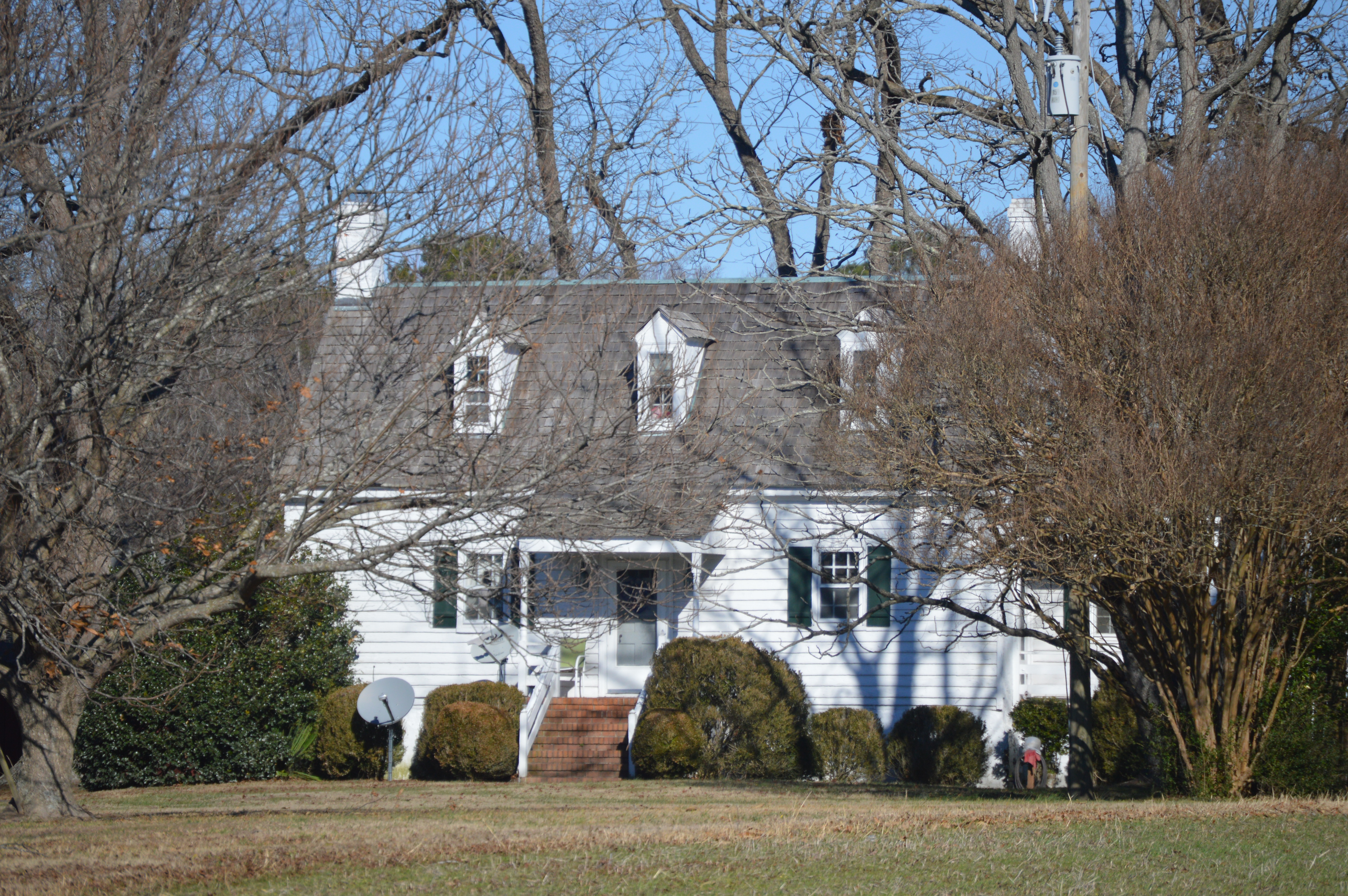
- Front of the house

- Location within Virginia Location within the United States
- Location: 13009 East Windsor Blvd., near Windsor, Virginia
- Coordinates: 36°48′16″N 76°42′28″W
- Area: 67 acres (27 ha)
- Built: c. 1796
- Built by: Saunders, Henry
- Architectural style: Georgian
- NRHP reference No.: 04000479
- VLR No.: 046-0006

Significant dates
- Added to NRHP: May 19, 2004
- Designated VLR: March 17, 2004

Henry Saunders House is a historic home located near Windsor, Isle of Wight County, Virginia, United States. The house was built about 1796, and is a 1 1/2-story, three bay Georgian style frame dwelling. It has a gable roof with dormers and a one-story side wing. Also on the property are four additional contributing buildings and one contributing structure.

It was listed on the National Register of Historic Places in 1991.
