= Ann Loreille Saunders =

British historian and editor (1930–2019)

Ann Loreille Saunders MBE FSA
- Born: Ann Loreille Cox-Johnson; 23 May 1930; Marylebone, London, United Kingdom
- Died: 13 February 2019 (aged 88); London, England
- Occupations: historian, educator writer and editor
- Spouse: Bruce Saunders (m. 1960)

Academic background
- Education: University of London (BA); University of Leicester (PhD)

Academic work
- Discipline: Historian
- Sub-discipline: History of London

Dr Ann Loreille Saunders MBE FSA (née Cox-Johnson, 23 May 1930 – 13 February 2019) was a British historian, educator writer and editor. She specialised in the history of London.

== Early life and family ==
Saunders was born Ann Loreille Cox-Johnson on 23 May 1930 in Marylebone, London. In 1960, she married Bruce Saunders.

== Career ==
Before completing her PhD, Saunders worked as Borough Archivist at the Marylebone Public Library. The subject of Saunders PhD thesis at the University of Leicester was the history of Regents Park in London.

As an academic, Saunders lectured in many London educational establishments, was an Honorary Fellow of University College London and a governor of Bedford College. She served as President of both the Camden History Society and the Saint Marylebone Society, and was a Council Member of the Society of Antiquaries of London.

Saunders was also closely involved with the London Topographical Society for many years. From 1980-2015, as the Society's Honorary Editor, Saunders edited volumes 24-31 of its five-yearly Journal, the "London Topographical Record", and supervised the Society’s annual publications during this period. Among these publications were the A-Z volumes on Edwardian London and the London of King Charles II.

Saunders was also the founder member and editor Costume, the journal of The Costume Society, which was established in 1967. She regularly reviewed for the journal, until she retired in 2008. On the occasion of her eightieth birthday in 2010, volume 44 of the journal was dedicated to her.

In 2000, Saunders was appointed a Member of the Order of the British Empire (MBE) in the New Year Honours List.

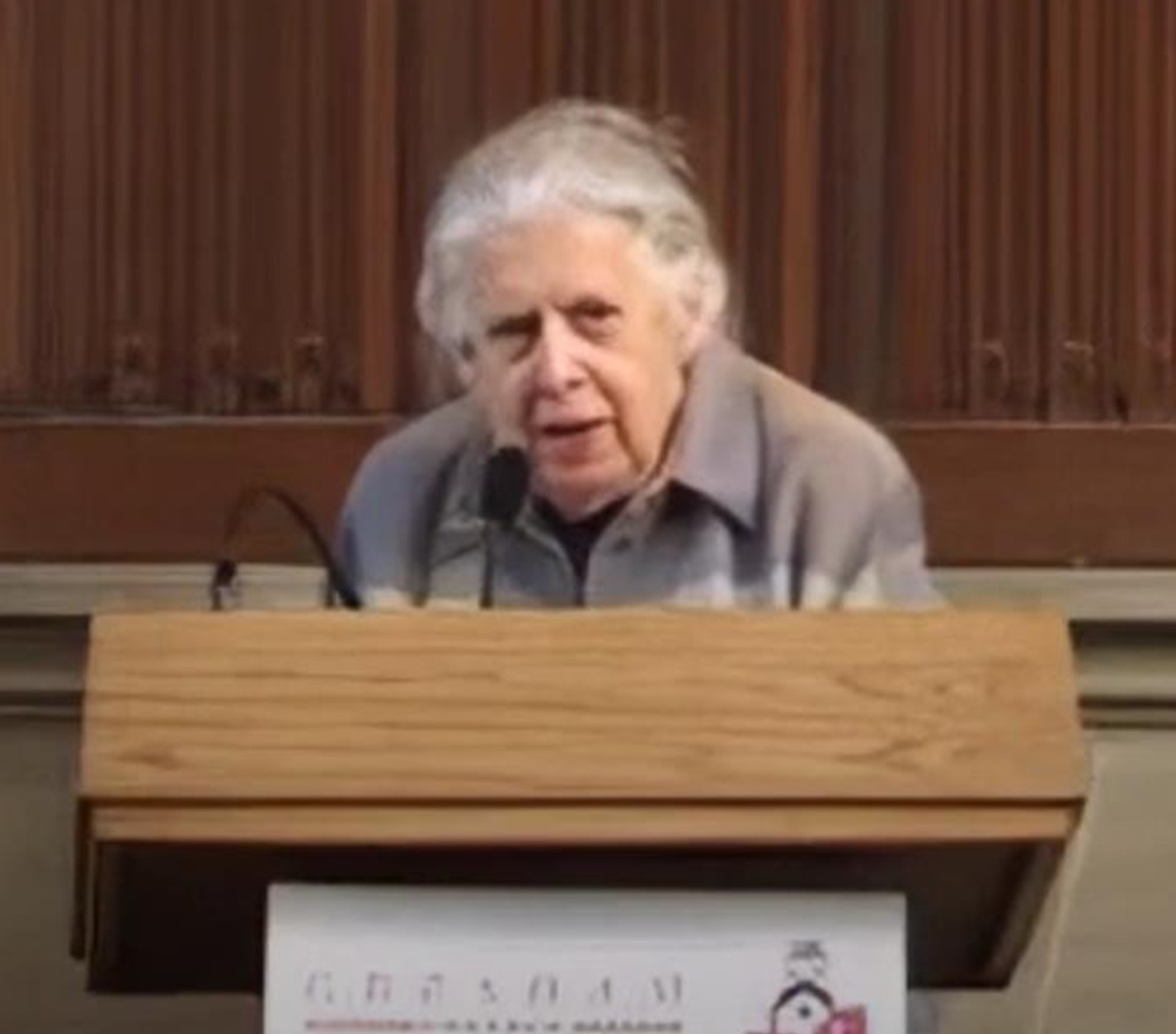
Saunders delivering a Gresham Lecture on 8 October 2004 - "London 1616: a snapshot of London early in James I's reign"

== Death ==
Saunders died in 2019 in London, England, aged 88.

== Selected lectures ==
Two of Saunders' Gresham lectures are available to view online:

- London 1616 – a snapshot of London early in James I’s reign – 4 October 2004
- Our Marble Tribute – 18 October 2005

== Selected publications ==
=== Authored ===
- Regent’s Park: a study of the development of the area from 1066 to the present day, 1969, 2nd edition 1981.
- The Art and Architecture of London, 1994
- St. Paul's: The Story of a Cathedral, 2001.
- A History of the Merchant Taylors’ Company, 2004.

=== Edited ===
- Arthur Mee’s London North of the Thames, 1972.
- Arthur Mee’s London: the City and Westminster, 1975.
- The London County Council Bomb Damage Maps, 2005.
