= Matt Saunders =

Matt Saunders may refer to:

- Matt Saunders (artist) (born 1975), American contemporary artist
- Matt Saunders (rugby union, born 1988), rugby union player for the Philippines national rugby union team
- Matt Saunders (rugby union, born 1982), rugby union player for Southland and Highlanders Super Rugby
