= David Saunders (psychologist) =

Canadian economist

Dean of Smith School of Business, Queen's University
- In office July 1, 2003 – October 15, 2019
- Preceded by: Lewis Johnson (acting)
- Succeeded by: Teri Shearer (interim)

Personal details
- Born: David MacIntosh Saunders; September 18, 1956 (age 70)
- Education: York University (BA); University of Western Ontario (MA, PhD)
David Saunders
Academic background
- Thesis: The Effects of Different Dispute Resolution Procedures on Bargaining Outcome, Process, and Negotiators' Perceptions (1984)
- Doctoral advisor: Neil Vidmar
Academic work
- Discipline: Social psychology
- Institutions: Queen's University; University of Calgary; Université de Montréal; McGill University; Duke University

David Saunders (born September 18, 1956) is a Canadian psychologist and university administrator. He is currently serving as Professor (Administration) in Organizational Behaviour, Director of International and Acting Academic Director of the Master of Management in Analytics (MMA) program at the Desautels Faculty of Management at McGill University. He was the Dean of the Smith School of Business, Queen's University between 2003 and 2019.

== Education and career ==
Saunders was born in Canada. He graduated from York University in 1979 with a BA in psychology, then went on to complete a MA (1980) and PhD (1984) at the University of Western Ontario, studying social psychology. He began his career as a postdoctoral fellow at the Fuqua School of Business, Duke University. He returned to Canada 2 years later in 1986, first as an assistant professor at the Faculty of Management (now Desautels Faculty of Management) at McGill University, then an associate professor in 1992, during which he started and directed the MBA Japan program. He also had a brief stay at HEC Montréal as a visiting professor from 1992 to 1993.

In 1999, the University of Calgary appointed Saunders as the Dean of its Haskayne School of Business, where he also became a full professor. In 2002, Queen's University announced he would succeed Margot Northey as the Dean of the Queen's School of Business (now Smith School of Business). He assumed the role on July 1, 2003.

Saunders resigned from the deanship for an administrative leave in 2019, while retaining his professor position at Queen's. Although reported to return to his professor position in 2023, he joined Moscow School of Management SKOLKOVO as a professor in October 2021.

Saunders has co-authored several business textbooks, including Essentials of Negotiation (7th ed.) and Negotiation (8th ed.).

Saunders has been an executive-in-residence at Forthlane Partners since 2020.
