= Philip Saunders (cricketer) =

Australian-born cricketer (born 1929)

Personal information
- Full name: Philip Frederick Saunders
- Born: 28 April 1929 (age 97); Adelaide, South Australia, Australia
- Batting: Right-handed
- Bowling: Leg break Right-arm fast

Domestic team information
- Years: Team
- 1951–1952: Leicestershire

Career statistics
| Competition | First-class |
|---|---|
| Matches | 9 |
| Runs scored | 93 |
| Batting average | 13.28 |
| 100s/50s | –/– |
| Top score | 30 |
| Balls bowled | 438 |
| Wickets | 6 |
| Bowling average | 31.66 |
| 5 wickets in innings | – |
| 10 wickets in match | – |
| Best bowling | 3/57 |
| Catches/stumpings | 2/– |
- Source: Cricinfo, 9 February 2013

Philip Frederick Saunders (born 28 April 1929) is an Australian-born cricketer whose career in first-class cricket was spent entirely playing in England. Saunders was a right-handed batsman who bowled both leg break and right-arm fast. He was born at Adelaide, South Australia.

Saunders was recruited for Leicestershire in English cricket alongside another young South Australian club cricketer, Murray Sargent, by the captain and secretary Charles Palmer; Leicestershire already had two prominent Australian cricketers in Jack Walsh and Vic Jackson. Saunders made his first-class debut for Leicestershire against Oxford University at the University Parks in 1951, in what was his only appearance in that season. He made eight appearances the following season, the last of which came against Derbyshire in the 1952 County Championship. He made a total of nine first-class appearances for Leicestershire, scoring 93 runs at an average of 13.28, with a high score of 30. With the ball, he took 6 wickets at a bowling average of 31.66, with best figures of 3/57.
