= Khalen Saunders =

American football player (born 1996)

Profile
- Position: Defensive tackle

Personal information
- Born: August 9, 1996 (age 30); St. Louis, Missouri, U.S.
- Listed height: 6 ft 0 in (1.83 m)
- Listed weight: 324 lb (147 kg)

Career information
- High school: Parkway Central (Chesterfield, Missouri)
- College: Western Illinois (2014–2018)
- NFL draft: 2019: 3rd round, 84th overall pick

Career history
- Kansas City Chiefs (2019–2022); New Orleans Saints (2023–2024); Jacksonville Jaguars (2025); New York Jets (2025); Tennessee Titans (2026)*
- * Offseason or practice squad member only

Awards and highlights
- 2× Super Bowl champion (LIV, LVII); 2× First-team All-MVFC (2017–2018)

Career NFL statistics as of 2025
- Total tackles: 193
- Sacks: 7.5
- Pass deflections: 6
- Interceptions: 1
- Stats at Pro Football Reference

Khalen Saunders (born August 9, 1996) is an American professional football defensive tackle. He played college football for the Western Illinois Leathernecks and was selected in the third round of the 2019 NFL draft by the Kansas City Chiefs. Saunders has also played in the NFL for the New Orleans Saints.

== College career ==
After playing high school football as a running back and a defensive lineman at Parkway Central High School, Saunders received only one Division I scholarship offer, from Western Illinois.

During his career at Western Illinois, Saunders mainly played defensive line but also sporadically continued his career on the offensive side of the ball, recording a rushing and a receiving touchdown in his career. After his senior season, he became the first Leatherneck ever invited to the Senior Bowl, and while playing in the contest, recorded the game's first sack on Will Grier, earning accolades from Oakland Raiders coach Jon Gruden. Saunders also picked up exposure over the offseason by having a video of him backflipping featured on prominent draft analyst Adam Schefter's Twitter account; the tweet amassed over 7,000 likes.

== Professional career ==
Pre-draft measurables
Height	Weight	Arm length	Hand span	Wingspan	40-yard dash	10-yard split	20-yard split	20-yard shuttle	Three-cone drill	Vertical jump	Broad jump	Bench press
6 ft 0 3/8 in (1.84 m)	324 lb (147 kg)	32 1/4 in (0.82 m)	9 1/8 in (0.23 m)	6 ft 6 3/8 in (1.99 m)	5.01 s	1.73 s	2.91 s	4.62 s	7.57 s	30.5 in (0.77 m)	8 ft 5 in (2.57 m)	27 reps
All values from NFL Combine

=== Kansas City Chiefs ===
Saunders was selected by the Kansas City Chiefs in the third round with the 84th overall pick in the 2019 NFL draft. Saunders won Super Bowl LIV when the Chiefs defeated the San Francisco 49ers 31–20.

Saunders was placed on injured reserve on September 19, 2020 after suffering a dislocated elbow in Week 1. He was activated on October 24.

On November 30, 2021, Saunders was placed on injured reserve. He was activated on January 24, 2022.

In 2022, Saunders helped the Chiefs win Super Bowl LVII against the Philadelphia Eagles 38–35 with Saunders recording two tackles and a sack in the game.

=== New Orleans Saints ===
On March 17, 2023, Saunders signed a three-year, $14.5 million contract with the New Orleans Saints.

In 2024, during the Saints' Week 5 game against the Kansas City Chiefs, Saunders recorded the first interception of his career against Patrick Mahomes on a deflected pass in the end zone and returned the ball 37 yards. The Saints scored a touchdown on the ensuing drive, but ultimately lost the game 26–13.

=== Jacksonville Jaguars ===
On August 17, 2025, the Saints traded Saunders to the Jacksonville Jaguars in exchange for center Luke Fortner. He made two appearances for Jacksonville, recording three combined tackles. Saunders was waived on November 13.

=== New York Jets ===
On November 17, 2025, Saunders signed with the New York Jets.

=== Tennessee Titans ===
On August 2, 2026, Saunders signed with the Tennessee Titans. On August 30, he was waived by the Titans as a part of final roster cuts before the start of the regular season.

== NFL career statistics ==
Legend
	Won the Super Bowl
**Bold**	Career high

=== Regular season ===
Year	Team	Games		Tackles					Interceptions						Fumbles	
Year	Team	GP	GS	Cmb	Solo	Ast	Sck	TFL	PD	Int	Yds	Avg	Lng	TD	FF	FR
2019	KC	12	4	22	13	9	1.0	0	1	0	0	0.0	0	0	0	0
2020	KC	3	1	3	3	0	0.0	0	0	0	0	0.0	0	0	0	0
2021	KC	7	0	8	2	6	0.0	0	0	0	0	0.0	0	0	0	0
2022	KC	16	0	48	22	26	**3.5**	**3**	1	0	0	0.0	0	0	0	0
2023	NO	**17**	**17**	**57**	**24**	**33**	0.0	1	1	0	0	0.0	0	0	0	0
2024	NO	13	10	43	18	25	2.0	**3**	**3**	**1**	**37**	**37.0**	**37**	0	0	0
2025	JAX	2	0	3	0	3	0	0	0	0	0	0.0	0	0	0	0
2025	NYJ	7	0	9	5	4	1.0	1	0	0	0	0.0	0	0	0	0
Career		77	32	193	87	106	7.5	8	6	1	37	37.0	37	0	0	0

=== Playoffs ===
Year	Team	Games		Tackles					Interceptions						Fumbles	
Year	Team	GP	GS	Cmb	Solo	Ast	Sck	TFL	PD	Int	Yds	Avg	Lng	TD	FF	FR
2019	KC	**3**	0	3	2	**1**	0.0	0	0	0	0	0.0	0	0	0	0
2022	KC	**3**	0	**5**	**4**	**1**	**1.0**	**1**	0	0	0	0.0	0	0	0	0
Career		6	0	8	6	2	1.0	1	0	0	0	0.0	0	0	0	0

== Personal life ==
Saunders has a daughter, who his then-fiancée gave birth to while he was preparing for the 2019 Senior Bowl.

Saunders has a brother, Kameron, a professional dancer and choreographer. Kam performed as a dancer on Taylor Swift's The Eras tour. When it was made public that Kam was only able to get flight to the audition since his brother Khalen bought a plane ticket for him, Swifties donated over $20,000 to his charity. His foundation, The Original Element Foundation, focuses on Mentorship, Inclusion and Health and Wellness.
