= Thomas Saunders (born 1593) =

Sir Thomas Saunders (1593–1653) was an English knight and Buckinghamshire landowner. He was a Member of Parliament, Deputy Lieutenant for Buckinghamshire, High Sheriff of Buckinghamshire and a Parliamentarian army officer during the English Civil War. His surname was often written as Sanders.

== Early life ==
Sir Thomas Saunders was the third son of Richard Saunders of Amersham (died 1601) and his wife, Elizabeth née Blount. The Saunders had been major landowners in Buckinghamshire for several generations and his father had been lord of the manors of Moreton in Dinton and Pitchcott. Through his mother, Sir Thomas' first cousin was Henry Blount (knight)

Saunders matriculated at King's College, Cambridge in 1613. He was admitted to the Middle Temple that same year.

== Estate ==
The manor of Pitchcott had passed from Richard Saunders to John Saunders, his eldest son. John Saunders died in 1623 and the manor passed to his daughter Elizabeth and her husband Sir Walter Pye. Sir Walter and Elizabeth conveyed the manor of Pitchcott to Sir Thomas Saunders and his brother Francis in 1637. Sir Thomas Saunders also owned lands in the nearby parishes of Oving and North Marston.

== Career ==
In 1638, Sir Thomas Saunders was a justice of the peace for the county of Buckinghamshire. During the Short Parliament in 1640, Sir Thomas was returned to Parliament as one of the burgesses for the borough of Aylesbury. Due to the fact that the Short Parliament only sat for three weeks, it is unclear whether or not Sir Thomas attended any sessions of Parliament.

In May 1642, under the authority of Philip Wharton, 4th Baron Wharton, Sir Thomas Saunders was appointed Deputy Lieutenant for the County of Buckinghamshire.

Saunders fought on the side of Parliament at the Battle of Edgehill as a captain in Arthur Goodwin's troop of horse. Sir Thomas retired from the Parliamentary army in January 1643. An account of his experience as a captain in the army is held by the National Archives in Kew.

He once again served as a justice of the peace in 1646. in 1648, he was appointed by Parliament to the committee for the County of Buckinghamshire for the purpose of settling the Militia.

In 1649, Saunders was appointed and served as High Sheriff of Buckinghamshire.

== Family and personal life ==
In 1623, Saunders was knighted by James I at Newmarket. Sir Thomas Saunders married Alice Watkins in 1625. Through his wife Alice, he was the brother-in-law of Charles Fleetwood of the Vache, Buckinghamshire.

Thomas Saunders ( -1690) was the eldest son and heir of Sir Thomas Saunders. Thomas would marry Elizabeth Proby (1626- ), the sister of Sir Thomas Proby, 1st Bt.
