= La rédemption =

Oratorio in three parts by Charles Gounod

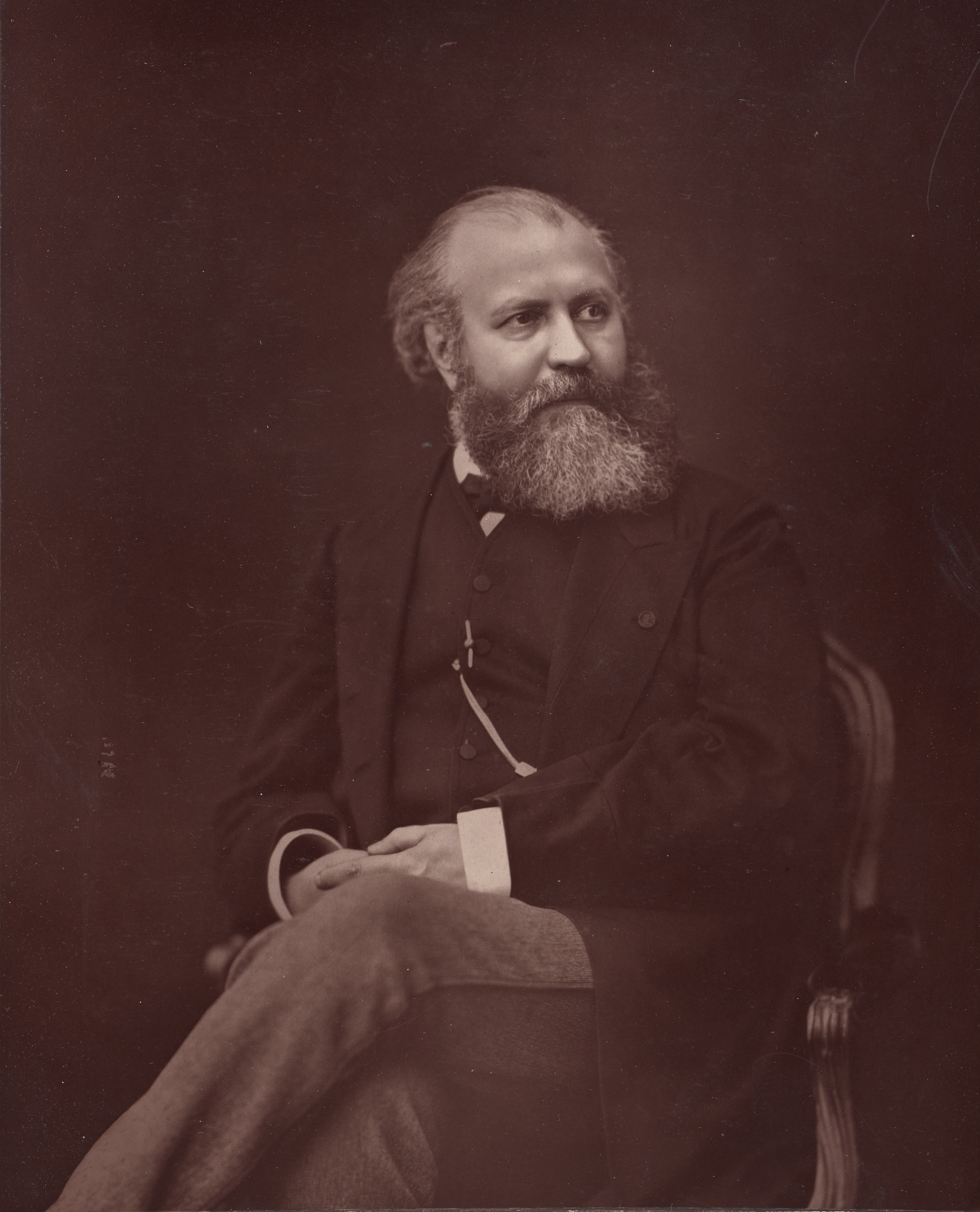
Charles Gounod

La Rédemption (The Redemption) is an oratorio in three parts by Charles Gounod arranged for the first time in 1882.

== Composition ==
La Rédemption is based on much earlier sketches, which were finished only after his publisher, Novello, arranged for its performances at the Birmingham Festival in 1882. The oratorio was a huge popular success and cemented Gounod's position in England. In the chorus of La Pentecôte (The Pentecost), Gounod elaborates his oratoria by developing a theme which he had written for the Cantique de nos Martyrs, which he had written with Father Daller of the Paris Foreign Missions Society in honour of the martyrs of Korea in 1866.

== Theme ==
La Rédemption was a return to Christian-themed sacred music which Charles Gounod had adhered to since his time in Rome, or in Berlin when he wrote an oratorio on the subject of Judith in 1842, or during his time as organist for the Chapel of the Paris Foreign Missions Society.

In three parts, it is a meditation on the Resurrection of Christ, the Pentecost or descent of the Holy Spirit on the Blessed Virgin Mary and the Apostles, and the Final coming of Christ in glory.

== Production ==
The 1884 Paris premiere featured Jean-Baptiste Faure. Gounod considered this oratorio, and its sequel Mors et vita (1885) as his greatest achievements.

An orchestration of the oratorio composed by Berthold Tours gave rise to a copyright controversy after it was played differently at the Boston Theatre on 21 January 1883. In the end the United States Circuit Court decided that the publication of a piano-forte score did not entitle any one to arrange orchestral parts therefrom and perform the work as being either that of the composer or the arranger, affecting the vexed question of copyright treaty between England and the United States at the time. The controversy, beyond its bitterness, reveals the popularity of the oratoria which had rapidly conquered an audience in England and in America.

== Reception ==
Though the reception of La Redemption was contrasted, artists such a pianist Franz Liszt considered that it was a "turn towards the sublime" and that success was not what Gounod was seeking. In England The Redemption was widely appreciated and given "a place among the highest things of well-judged and rightly applied art" according to music critic Joseph Bennett. After hearing La Rédemption being played in Vienna, another music critic Eduard Hanslick wrote a bitter commenterary in the Neue Freie Press in which he said that he considered Charles Gounod had written his oratorio "more as a devotee than as a musician". Notwithstanding a certain amount of adverse criticism, has continued steadily to advance in popular estimation.

== Recordings ==
- " La Pentecôte" - extract on Airs sacrés français Françoise Pollet, orchestre national d'Île-de-France Jacques Mercier 1997
- "From thy love as a Father" - on Gounod Sacred Choral Works. Joanna Burton
