= Frederick Saunders (librarian) =

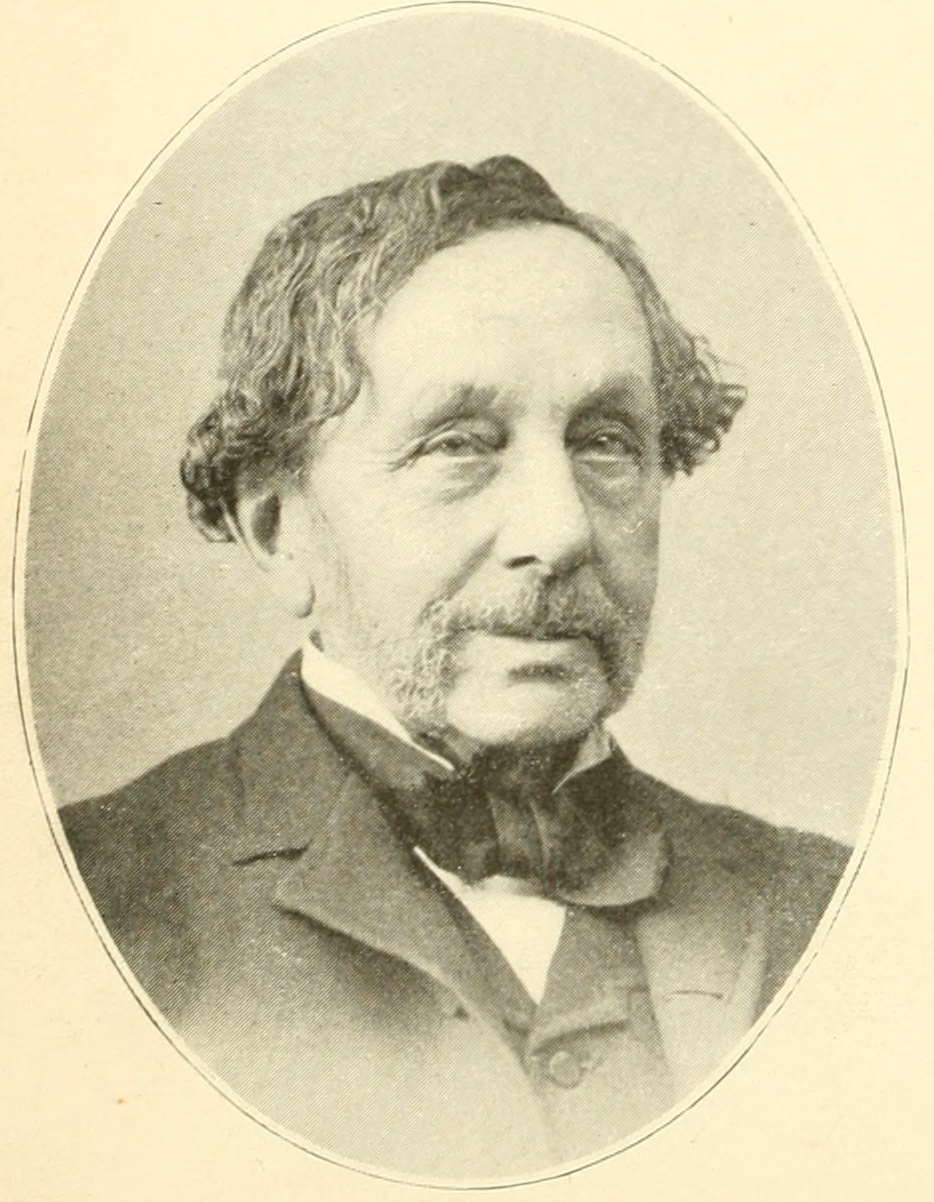
- Born: 14 August 1807; London
- Died: 12 December 1902 (aged 95); New York City
- Resting place: Green-Wood Cemetery
- Occupation: Writer, librarian, bookseller, newspaper editor
- Employer: George P. Putnam; Harper; New York Post

Frederick Saunders (14 August 1807 – 12 December 1902) was an English-born American librarian.

== Biography ==
Frederick Saunders was born in London on 14 August 1807. His father was the senior member of Saunders and Ottley, book publishers of London. After completing his education, he became a clerk in his father's book store. He was sent to New York in 1837 to secure an American copyright on the publications of the firm. He also petitioned the US Congress for the passage of an act looking to the protection of both American and British authors. His objective failed, although it was backed by Henry Clay, Washington Irving, William Cullen Bryant, and George Bancroft.

He was for a time city editor of the New York Evening Post, William Cullen Bryant, editor; was employed by Harper and Brothers and by George P. Putnam, 1850–55, and was assistant librarian of the Astor Library through the offices of Washington Irving, 1859–76, and librarian, 1876–96, when he was retired with full pay.

He was married, 18 September 1833, to Mary Ann Farr of London. The honorary degree of A.M. was conferred on him by Madison University, Hamilton. N.Y.. in 1853. He was the editor of Our National Centennial Jubilee (1877); and with Henry T. Tuckerman, of Homes of American Authors (1853). He contributed to the Knickerbocker Magazine; Democratic Rei-ieic; New York Quarterly; and is the author of : Memoirs of the Great Metropolis, or London from, the Tower to the Crystal Palace (1852); New York in a Nut-shell (1853); Salad for the Solitary (1853; rev. ed., 1856–1872); Salad for the Social (1856); Pearls of Thought. Religious and Philosophical, Gathered from Old Authors (1858); Mosaics (1859); Festival of Song, with 73 illustrations (1868); About Women, Love, and Marriage (1868); Evenings with the Sacred Poets (1869); Pastime Papers (1885); The Story of Some Famous Books (1887); Stray Leaves of Literature (1888); Story of the Discovery of the New World (1892); Character Studies (1894).

He died in New York City on 12 December 1902, and was buried at Green-Wood Cemetery.
