= Sanders (surname) =

Sanders is a patronymic name, meaning "son of Alexander". The name derives from the abbreviation xander, with Alexander deriving from the Greek "Ἀλέξανδρος" (Aléxandros), meaning "Defender of the people".

Other known spelling variations: Sander, Saunder, Saunders, Zander, Sender, Zender and more, although different variants may have other origins (such as places like Zandt or Senden). The surname originates from Germany, The Netherlands, England, Scotland, and Ireland in most cases.

Notable persons and fictional characters with the surname include:

== A ==
- Aaron Sanders (born 1996), American actor
- Ace Sanders (born 1991), American football player
- Adam Sanders (born 1988), American singer and songwriter
- Addison Hiatt Sanders (1823–1912), American Civil War brevet brigadier general and Secretary of the Montana Territory
- Adrian Sanders (born 1959), British politician
- Ajai Sanders (born 1974), American actress and stand-up comedian
- Al Sanders (1941–1995), American news broadcaster
- Al Sanders (basketball) (1950–1994), American basketball player
- Albert Sanders (1889–1957), Canadian politician in Alberta
- Alex Sanders (actor) (born 1966), American pornographic actor
- Alex Sanders (politician) (1938–2026), American judge and politician
- Alex Sanders (Wiccan) (1926–1988), British Wiccan priest
- Ali Sanders (born 1970), British physician and rower
- Alvin Sanders (born 1952), American actor
- Amy Sanders (born 1983), American basketball player
- Andries Sanders (born 1933), Dutch psychologist
- Ann Sanders (born 1960), Australian television journalist and news presenter
- Anne Sanders (born 1931), English cricketer
- Annemarie Sanders (born 1958), Dutch equestrian
- Anthony Sanders (born 1974), American baseball player
- Antoon Sanders (1586–1664), Flemish cleric and historian
- Antwoine Sanders (born 1977), American football player
- Anucha Browne Sanders, American women's basketball player and executive
- April Sanders, Canadian politician
- Archie D. Sanders (1857–1941), American politician
- Arthur Sanders (cricketer) (1900–1920), English cricketer
- Arthur Sanders (footballer) (1901–1983), English footballer
- Arthur Sanders (RAF officer) (1898–1974), Royal Air Force air marshal

== B ==
- Barefoot Sanders (1925–2008), American judge
- Barry Sanders (born 1968), American National Football League running back
- Barry Sanders (professor) (born 1938), American sociolinguist
- Barry J. Sanders (born 1994), American football running back
- Ben Sanders (1865–1930), American baseball player
- Benita Sanders (born 1935), Canadian printmaker
- Bentlee Sanders (born 1998), American football player
- Bernie Sanders (born 1941), American politician, presidential candidate in 2016 and 2020
- Bev Sanders (born 1953), American snowboarder
- Beverly Sanders (born 1940), American actress, comedian and voice artist
- Bill Sanders (1930–2021), American political cartoonist
- Billy Sanders (1955–1985), Australian international speedway rider
- Billy C. Sanders (born 1936), U.S. Navy sailor and master chief petty officer of the navy
- Bob Sanders (born 1981), American football safety
- Bob Sanders (American football coach) (born 1953), American football coach
- Brandon Sanders (born 1973), American football player
- Braylon Sanders (born 1999), American football player
- Bryan Sanders (born 1970), American ski jumper

== C ==
- C. J. Sanders (born 1996), American actor, son of the wide receiver Chris Sanders
- Cam Sanders (born 1996), American baseball player
- Cameron Sanders (born 1958), American journalist
- Candice Sanders (born 1977), American beauty pageant contestant
- Carl Sanders (1925–2014), American politician
- Carl Julian Sanders (1912–2007), American Methodist bishop
- Carol Sanders (1932–2012), American bridge player
- Charlie Sanders (1946–2015), American football player
- Charlie Sanders (actor) (born 1979), American actor, comedian, and writer
- Cheryl J. Sanders, African-American womanist scholar and ethicist
- Chris Sanders (director) (born 1962), American film animator and voice actor
- Chris Sanders (quarterback) (born 1977), American football quarterback
- Chris Sanders (running back) (born 1973), American football running back
- Chris Sanders (wide receiver) (born 1972), American football wide receiver
- Christoph Sanders (born 1968), American actor
- Corey Sanders (born 1975), American boxer
- Corrie Sanders (1966–2012), South African boxer

== D ==
- Dale Sanders (born 1953), British biochemist and plant biologist
- Dale Sanders (railroad photographer) (born 1957), American railroad photographer
- Daniel Sanders (disambiguation), several people
- Danny Sanders (born 1955), American football player
- Darius Sanders (born 1983), American football player
- Darnell Sanders (born 1979), American football player
- Daryl Sanders (born 1941), American football player
- David Sanders (disambiguation), several people
- Deac Sanders (born 1950), American football player
- Dee Sanders (1921–2007), American baseball pitcher
- Deion Sanders (born 1967), American football coach, former football and baseball player
- Denis Sanders (1929–1987), American film director, screenwriter and producer
- Dirk Sanders (1934–2002), French dancer, actor and choreographer
- Donald Sanders (1930–1999), American lawyer, key figure in the Watergate investigation
- Dori Sanders (born 1939), African-American novelist
- Doug Sanders (1933–2020), American professional golfer
- Drew Sanders (born 2000), American football player

== E ==
- E. P. Sanders (1937–2022), American New Testament scholar
- Ecstasia Sanders (born 1985), Canadian film actress
- Edward or Ed Sanders (disambiguation), several people
- Edmundo Sanders (1924–1991), Argentine broadcaster and actor
- Eleanor Butler Sanders (1849–1905), American suffragist and socialite
- Emmanuel Sanders (born 1987), American football player
- Eric Sanders (disambiguation), several people
- Erin Sanders (born 1991), American actress
- Ethan Sanders (born 2005), Australian rugby league footballer
- Evan Sanders (born 1981), Indonesian actor
- Everett Sanders (1882–1950), American politician
- Ewoud Sanders (born 1958), Dutch historian of the Dutch language and journalist

== F ==
- Felicia Sanders (1922–1975), American pop singer
- Francesca Sanders, American playwright
- Frank Sanders (American football) (born 1973), American football player
- Frank Sanders (ice hockey) (1949–2012), American ice hockey player
- Frank P. Sanders (1919–1997), American Under Secretary of the Navy
- Fyodor Ivanovich Sanders (1755–1836), Russian general

== G ==
- Gene Sanders (born 1956), American football player
- George Sanders (disambiguation), several people
- George Nicholas Sanders (1812–1873), American official suspected in the assassination of Abraham Lincoln
- Gillian Sanders (born 1981), South African triathlete

== H ==
- Harland Sanders (1890–1980), better known as Colonel Sanders, founder of Kentucky Fried Chicken
- Helena Sanders (1911–1997), Cornish humanitarian, cultural activist, politician and, poet
- Helma Sanders-Brahms (1940–2014), née Sanders, German film director
- Henry Sanders (disambiguation)
- Herbert Sanders (1878–1938), English-born Canadian organist and composer
- Horace T. Sanders (1820–1865), American politician and military leader
- Hugh Sanders (1911–1966), American actor

== I ==
- Ian Sanders (born 1961), British cricketer

== J ==
- Jackie Wolcott, American diplomat
- James Sanders (disambiguation)
- Jamie Sanders, American horse racing jockey and trainer
- Jan Sanders (1919–2000), Dutch painter
- Jan Sanders van Hemessen (c. 1500–c. 1566), Flemish painter
- Jared Y. Sanders, Sr. (1869–1944), American politician
- Jasmine Sanders, German-American model
- Jason Sanders (born 1995), American football player
- Jay O. Sanders (born 1953), American character actor
- Jeff Sanders (born 1966), American basketball player
- Jeremy Sanders, British chemist
- Jesse Sanders (born 1989), American basketball player
- Jesse Sanders (1943–2020), rhythm guitarist and founding member of The Tornadoes
- Jessie Sanders (1893–1985), American politician and ranch operator
- Jerry Sanders (businessman) (born 1936), American businessman, co-founder of Advanced Micro Devices (AMD)
- Jerry Sanders (politician) (born 1950), American politician, chief of police and mayor of San Diego
- Jim Sanders (rugby league) (1900–1981), New Zealand rugby player
- Jimmy Sanders (baseball) (1902–1975), American minor league baseball player and manager
- Jimmy Sanders (footballer) (1920–2003), English footballer
- Jock Sanders (born 1988), Canadian gridiron football player
- Joe Sanders (1896–1965), American jazz pianist, singer, and bandleader
- John Sanders (disambiguation)
- Johnny Sanders (1922–1990), American football executive
- Jon Sanders (born 1939), Australian yachtsman
- Joop Sanders (1921–2023), Dutch-born American abstract painter
- Joseph Sanders (1877–1960), German-American who helped invent the record player and helicopter
- Joseph G. Sanders (1828–1866), military officer in the American Civil War who fought for both the Union and the Confederacy
- Julia Sanders, English motorcyclist

== K ==
- Kaj Sanders (born 2006), American football player
- Karl Sanders (born 1964), American musician and founding member of the band Nile
- Kelsey Sanders (born 1990), American actress
- Ken Sanders (American football) (born 1950), American football player
- Ken Sanders (baseball) (born 1941), American baseball pitcher
- Ken Sanders (book dealer) (born 1951), American book dealer
- Kenny Sanders (born c. 1967), college basketball player for George Mason University
- Kerry Sanders, American news correspondent
- Kevin Sanders (born 1964), British motorcyclist, world record holder for circumnavigation
- Kevin Sanders (born 1982), American musician of the Georgia band Cartel
- Keylee Sue Sanders, Miss Kansas Teen USA and Miss Teen USA 1995
- Kim Sanders (born 1968), American singer and songwriter
- Kobe Sanders (born 2002), American basketball player
- Kyle Sanders, American heavy metal bassist/composer

== L ==
- Larry Sanders (basketball) (born 1988), American basketball player
- Larry Sanders (politician) (born 1935), British politician
- Larry J. Sanders (born 1954), better known as L.V., American R&B singer
- Lawrence Sanders (1920–1998), American novelist
- Lee Sanders, American composer
- Lewis Sanders (born 1978), American football player
- Lewis A. Sanders, American businessman
- Leyland Sanders (1927–2005), Australian sportsman
- Lisa Sanders (born 1956), American physician and journalist
- Lloyd Charles Sanders (1857–1927), English writer and biographer
- Loni Sanders (born 1958), American porn star and adult model
- Lonnie Sanders (born 1941), American football player
- Lou Sanders (born 1978), British comedian, writer and actress
- Louk Sanders (born 1950), Dutch tennis player
- Luc Sanders (born 1945), Belgian footballer
- Lucy Sanders (born 1954), American computer scientist, CEO and co-founder of the National Center for Women & Information Technology

== M ==
- Marieke Sanders-ten Holte (born 1941), Dutch politician
- Marion K. Sanders (1905–1977), American journalist, editor, and author
- Mark Sanders (disambiguation)
- Marlene Sanders (1931–2015), American news broadcaster
- Marvin Sanders (born 1967), American football secondary coach
- Mary Sanders (born 1985), Canadian rhythmic gymnast
- Mary Jo Sanders (born 1974), American boxer
- Matthew Charles Sanders (born 1981), better known by the stage name M. Shadows, American heavy metal singer
- Maxine Sanders (born 1946), prominent British member of the Wiccan faith and co-founder of Alexandrian Wicca
- Melvin Sanders (born 1981), American basketball player
- Michael Sinclair Sanders (born 1939), American parapsychologist and amateur archeologist
- Mike Sanders (basketball) (born 1960), American professional basketball player
- Mike Sanders (Missouri politician) (born 1967), Missouri politician
- Mike Sanders (wrestler) (born 1969), American stand-up comedian and former professional wrestler
- Miles Sanders (born 1997), American football player
- Mo Sanders (born 1971), American roller skater
- Morgan Sanders (1934–2021), American painter, photographer, and children's book author
- Morgan G. Sanders (1878–1956), American politician
- Moses Sanders (1873–1941), English footballer

== N ==
- Neill Sanders (1923–1992), British French horn player
- Newell Sanders (1850–1938), Chattanooga businessman and former senator from Tennessee
- Nicholas Sanders (c. 1530–1581), English Roman Catholic priest and historian
- Nick Sanders, British Guinness World Record holder for fastest motorcycle circumnavigation
- Nick Sanders (musician), American jazz pianist and composer
- Nicola Sanders (born 1982), British sprinter and hurdler
- Noel Devine Sanders (born 1988), American college football running back
- Norm Sanders (born 1932), American-Australian politician, activist

== O ==
- Omer Sanders, American politician
- Orban Sanders (1919–2003), American football player
- Otto Liman von Sanders (1855–1929), German general

== P ==
- Pat Sanders, Canadian curler
- Patrick Sanders (British Army officer) (born 1966), British Army general and Chief of Staff
- Patrick Sanders (basketball) (born 1985), American basketball player
- Paul Sanders (disambiguation), several people
- Peter Sanders (disambiguation), several people
- Pharoah Sanders (1940–2022), American jazz saxophonist
- Phoenix Sanders (born 1995), American baseball player
- Prentice E. Sanders (1937–2021), San Francisco chief of police

== Q ==
- Quinn Sanders (born c. 1989), American football coach

== R ==
- Raheim Sanders (born 2002), American football player
- Rakim Sanders (born 1989), American basketball player
- Randy Sanders (born 1965), American football coach
- Ray Sanders (baseball) (1916–1983), American baseball player
- Ray Sanders (singer) (1935–2019), American country music singer
- Rebecca Sanders (born 1982), Australian field hockey player
- Reggie Sanders (born 1967), American baseball right fielder
- Reggie Sanders (first baseman) (1949–2002), American baseball first baseman
- Ric Sanders (born 1952), English violinist
- Richard Sanders (disambiguation)
- Rick Sanders (wrestler) (1945–1972), American Olympic wrestling champion
- Ricky Sanders (born 1962), American football player
- Ricky Sanders (racing driver) (born 1966), American NASCAR racing driver
- Robert Sanders, 1st Baron Bayford (1867–1940), English politician
- Robert Levine Sanders (1906–1974), American composer and conductor
- Robin R. Sanders, American ambassador to several African nations
- Ronald Sanders (diplomat) (born 1948), Antiguan Barbudan academic, diplomat and journalist
- Ronald Sanders (film editor), Canadian film editor and television producer
- Ronald Sanders (writer) (1932–1991), American journalist and writer
- Roy Sanders (American League pitcher) (1894–1963), American League baseball pitcher
- Roy Sanders (National League pitcher) (1892–1950), American National League baseball pitcher
- Rupert Sanders (born 1971), British film director
- Ruth Sanders Cordes (1890–1988), née Sanders, American tennis player
- Ryley Sanders (born 2005), Australian rules footballer

== S ==
- Sam Sanders (born 1938), American football coach and player
- Samuel Sanders (1937–1999), American classical pianist
- Sarah Huckabee Sanders, American politician
- Satch Sanders (born 1938), American basketball player and coach
- Scott Sanders (disambiguation)
- Seb Sanders (born 1971), English race jockey
- Shedeur Sanders (born 2002), American football player
- Shelly Sanders (born 1964), Canadian American author and journalist
- Shilo Sanders (born 2000), American football player
- Sol Sanders (1926–2022), American journalist
- Spencer Sanders (born 1999), American football player
- Steve Sanders (disambiguation), several people
- Storm Sanders (born 1994), Australian tennis player
- Sue Sanders (born 1947), British LGBT rights activist
- Summer Sanders (born 1972), American swimmer, sports broadcaster, and actress

== T ==
- Ted Sanders (linguist), Dutch linguist and academic
- Ted Sanders (writer) (born 1969), American writer
- Teee Sanders (born 1968), American volleyball player
- Terence Sanders (1901–1985), British rower
- Terry Sanders (born 1931), American film producer and director
- Thomas Sanders (disambiguation), several people
- Tim Sanders (disambiguation), several people
- T. J. Sanders (born 2003), American football player
- Tom Sanders, British mathematician
- Tommy Sanders (born 1954), American sportscaster
- Tony Sanders (1957–2015), American poet
- Troy Sanders (born 1973), American heavy metal bassist and singer
- Troy Sanders (composer) (1901–1959), American composer and musician
- Tyler Sanders (2004–2022), American actor

== V ==
- Vince Sanders (born 1935), American broadcaster
- Viola B. Sanders (1921–2013), American deputy director of Women in the Navy
- Violet Sanders (1904–1983), British artist

== W ==
- Wade Sanders, American attorney and sex offender
- War Sanders (1877–1962), American baseball pitcher
- Wilbur F. Sanders (1834–1905), American lawyer and Senator from Montana
- Wilfred Sanders (1910–1965), English cricketer
- Will Sanders (born 1965), Dutch French horn player
- William Sanders (disambiguation)

== Z ==
- Zebrie Sanders (born 1989), American football player

== Fictional characters ==
- Charles, Elizabeth, Jamie, Judith and Kate Sanders, in the soap opera One Life to Live
- Greg Sanders, in the American TV show CSI: Crime Scene Investigation
- James Sanders, a.k.a. Speed Demon in the Marvel Universe
- Larry Sanders, played by Garry Shandling on the American television series The Larry Sanders Show
- Micah Sanders, in the NBC science fiction drama series Heroes
- Niki Sanders, in the television series Heroes
- Shiera Sanders, a.k.a. Hawkgirl in the DC Universe
- Stephen Sanders, alias used by the Marvel Comics character Doctor Strange
- Steve Sander (90210), in the American TV drama Beverly Hills, 90210
- Terry Sanders Jr., in the anime OVA Mobile Suit Gundam: The 08th MS Team
- Sanders of the River, created by Edgar Wallace
- Sanders, in the Canadian animated reality TV series Total Drama Presents: The Ridonculous Race

== See also ==
- General Sanders (disambiguation)
- Justice Sanders (disambiguation)
- Senator Sanders (disambiguation)
- Sander (name)
- Sandars (disambiguation)
- Sanderson (disambiguation)
