= James Saunders =

James Saunders may refer to:

- James Saunders (boxer) (born 1932), Canadian boxer
- James Saunders (composer) (born 1972), British composer
- James Saunders (cricketer) (1802–1832), English cricketer
- James Saunders (dancer) (1946-1996), American dancer, choreographer and movement teacher
- James Saunders (footballer) (1878–?), English footballer
- James Saunders (Medal of Honor) (1809–?), United States Navy quartermaster and Medal of Honor recipient
- James Saunders (playwright) (1925–2004), English playwright
- James Ebenezer Saunders (1829–1909), British architect

== See also ==
- James Sanders (disambiguation)
