= Ted Sanders =

Ted Sanders may refer to:

- Ted Sanders (linguist), Dutch linguist and academic
- Ted Sanders (writer) (born 1969), American writer
