= George Saunders (disambiguation) =

George Saunders is an American writer

George Saunders may also refer to:

- George Rideout (born George Saunders Rideout; 1945), Canadian politician
- Hilary St George Saunders (1898–1951), British author
- George Saunders (athlete) (1907–1996), member of the English 4×110 yards relay team
- G. K. Saunders (1910–2005), New Zealand radio and TV writer
- George Saunders (British wrestler), British Olympic wrestler
- George Saunders (Canadian wrestler) (born 1949), Canadian former wrestler
- George Saunders (footballer, born 1918) (1918–1982), English football player for Everton
- George Saunders (footballer, born 1989), English football player
- George Saunders (Royal Navy officer) (c. 1671–1734), naval officer, official and politician
- George Lethbridge Saunders (1807–1863), English painter
- George W. Saunders (1854–1933), American cattleman

== See also ==
- George Sanders (disambiguation)
