= Benita =

Benita may refer to:

- Benita (novel), a 1906 novel by H. Rider Haggard
- 45737 Benita, an asteroid

== Given name ==
- Benita Haastrup (born 1964), Danish jazz drummer
- Benita Sanders (born 1935), Canadian printmaker
- Benita Valente (1934–2025), American soprano
