= Richard Sanders =

Richard or Rick Sanders may refer to:

== Sport ==
- Ricky Sanders (born 1962), American football player
- Ricky Sanders (racing driver) (born 1966), former NASCAR driver
- Rick Sanders (wrestler) (1945–1972), Olympic wrestler from the United States

== Others ==
- Ric Sanders (born 1952), English violinist
- Richie Sanders (born 1963), American politician
- Richard Sanders (actor) (born 1940), American actor
- Richard Sanders (writer) (born 1949), author and former magazine editor
- Richard B. Sanders, Washington State Supreme Court justice
- Richard C. Sanders (1915–1976), United States Air Force officer
- Richard Sanders Rogers, Australian doctor (1861–1942)

== See also ==
- Richard Sanderson (born 1953), English singer
- Richard Sanderson (MP) (1784 –1857), English merchant, banker, and politician
- Richard Sanderson (cricketer) (1847–1906), English cricketer*Richard Saunders (disambiguation)
