= Ewout =

Ewout and Ewoud (both pronounced /ˈeːʋɑu̯t/) are Dutch masculine given names cognate to German Ewald and originally meaning "one who rules by the law". People with this name include:

- Anthony Ewoud Jan Modderman (1838–1885), Dutch Minister of Justice
- Ewout van Asbeck (born 1956), Dutch field hockey player
- Ewout Denijs (born 1987), Belgian footballer
- Ewoud van Everdingen (1873–1955), Dutch physicist and meteorologist
- Ewout Genemans (born 1985), Dutch television producer, presenter, singer and actor
- Ewoud Gommans (born 1990), Dutch volleyball player
- Ewout Holst (born 1978), Dutch swimmer
- Ewout Irrgang (born 1976), Dutch Socialist Party politician
- Ewoud Sanders (born 1958), Dutch historian and journalist.
- Marko Ewout Koers (born 1972), Dutch middle-distance runner
