= Richard Saunders (anatomist) =

Professor Richard Lorraine de Chasteney Holbourne Saunders FRSE FRMS (29 May 1908–21 December 1995) was a 20th century South African anatomist. He received international acclaim for his x-ray and electron microscopy investigations of neurological conditions.

== Life ==
Saunders was born on 29 May 1908 in Grahamstown, South Africa, the son of Lucy Anderson (née Meiklejohn) and Col Frederick Anastasius Saunders, an army surgeon. He studied medicine at Rhodes University then the University of Edinburgh, graduating with an MB ChB in 1932, In 1940 he received his doctorate (MD) with a dissertation on spina bifida.

He lectured in anatomy at the University of Edinburgh from 1933 to 1937. In 1937 he emigrated to Canada to take up a post as associate professor of Anatomy at Dalhousie University being appointed by Prof H. G. Grant. He became Assistant Professor in 1942 and full Professor in 1948.

In 1946 he was elected a Fellow of the Royal Society of Edinburgh. His proposers were Donald Mainland, James Couper Brash, William Frederick Harvey, and William Ogilvy Kermack.

He died on 21 December 1995 in West Jeddore, Nova Scotia, Canada. His body was returned to Scotland for burial at Ardchattan Kirk near Oban.

== Family ==
He married Dr Sarah Cameron, and together they had a son, Alistair Corstan de Cusance Maxwell Saunders.
