= Scott Sanders =

Scott Sanders may refer to:

- Scott Sanders (director) (born 1968), American screenwriter and director
- Scott Sanders (novelist) (born 1945), American novelist and essayist
- Scott Sanders (producer) (born 1957), American television producer and theatrical producer
- Scott Sanders (baseball) (born 1969), former Major League Baseball right-handed pitcher
- Scott Sanders (admiral), Deputy Commander, U.S. Second Fleet
- Scott Sanders (attorney) (born 1966), American defense attorney
