= Richard Saunders =

Richard Saunders may refer to:

- Benjamin Franklin (1706–1790), who used the pseudonym Richard Saunders
- Richard Saunders (photographer) (1922–1987), American photographer
- Richard Saunders (skeptic) (born 1965), Australian skeptic
- Richard Saunders (anatomist) (1908–1995), South African anatomist
- Richard M.K. Saunders (born 1964), botanist

== See also ==
- Richie Saunders (1913–1978), Australian rules footballer
- Richie Saunders (basketball) (born 2001), American basketball player
