= Senator Saunders (disambiguation) =

Alvin Saunders (1817–1899) was a U.S. Senator from Nebraska from 1877 to 1883.

Senator Saunders may also refer to:

- Bob Saunders (politician) (1929–2016), Florida State Senate
- Burt Saunders (born 1948), Florida State Senate
- John R. Saunders (1869–1934), Virginia State Senate

== See also ==
- Senator Sanders (disambiguation)
