= Tôn Thất Thiện =

South Vietnamese nationalist (1924–2014)

Ton That Thien
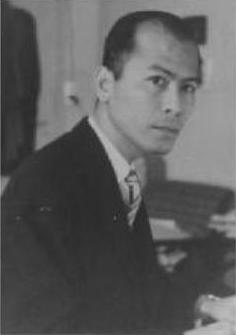
- Tôn Thất Thiện in 1963
- Born: 22 September 1924; Huế, Thừa Thiên, Vietnam
- Died: 3 October 2014 (aged 90)
- Movement: Nationalist
- Spouse: Lệ Vân

Tôn Thất Thiện (1924–2014) was a South Vietnamese nationalist of the post-World War II generation who had the rare distinction of serving and watching at close quarters the two historic leaders of post-World War II Vietnam: presidents Ho Chi Minh in the Viet Minh coalition in 1945–46, and Ngô Đình Diệm 1954–55/1956–59/1963. He played a significant though understated role in the nationalist attempt to preserve a non-Communist Vietnam.

From 1945 to 1975, Thien was an active participant or a personal witness to almost all of the major historic events in Vietnam: the 1945 August Revolution, the 1954 Geneva Conference, division of the country and birth of the Republic of Vietnam, the 1963 coup d'état against Ngô Đình Diệm, the 1968 Tet Offensive in Huế and the April 1975 Fall of Saigon. He knew or met virtually all of the significant actors among the North Vietnamese, South Vietnamese and American political and military leadership, as well as most foreign journalists who covered the conflict.

In 1968, he served as Minister of Information in the South Vietnamese government. His reformist efforts allowing an uncensored media led to the Magsaysay Award for Journalism, Literature and Creative Communication Arts in the same year. As a "Third Force" nationalist opposed to colonialism and communism, and dedicated to a mix of Confucian traditions and Western political ideals, he is most closely aligned with the evolutionary reformist vision of the famous Vietnamese nationalist, Phan Chu Trinh. In many ways he can be considered the personification of a "Quiet Vietnamese" counterpart to Graham Greene's fictional "Quiet American" character.

He died at his home in Ottawa, Canada on October 3, 2014.

== Overview ==
As a South Vietnamese government official, cabinet minister, Magsaysay Award winner, journalist, editor, historian and professor, Tôn Thất Thiện supported the independence of Vietnam from foreign political and cultural control, including French colonialism, communist dictatorship and American dominance. Described by Daniel Ellsberg as an "outstanding Vietnamese journalist", he was a leading supporter of freedom of the press and vociferous in his belief that the most effective strategy in fighting the Communists was to counter their claim to be the true and only nationalists fighting for Vietnam's national independence. His life saw the span of cataclysmic political and social changes in Vietnam from titular imperial rule under French colonialism to nationalist republican government to eventual communist rule.

In his life and writings, Thiện upheld the ideals drawn from the old, essentially Confucian traditions of the country - service to society, rule of customs and laws and orderly government. At the same time, he advocated the western ideals of modernity, progress, freedom and democracy developed from his contact with western culture through his studies in Huế, London and Geneva. His conception of Viet Nam's post-colonial society echoed that of Phan Chu Trinh, a leading Vietnamese nationalist and Confucian scholar of the early 20th century who nevertheless supported modernization through unreserved westernization.

A generation of domestic and foreign journalists in the 1950s and 1960s was influenced by Thiện's English-language critiques of the political crises in Vietnam, the political and social dynamics of the conflict and the consequent cultural impact. As an independent political commentator after 1966 he could be equally critical of misguided South Vietnamese government policies and abuses and the heavy-handedness of U.S. intervention in Viet Nam. His writings on the Vietnamese communist threat and the negative impact of American cultural, economic and political interventions showed a balanced and analytical approach that was recognized as distinctive in its time.

U.S. Ambassador Ellsworth Bunker's assessment of Thiện upon his appointment to the South Vietnamese cabinet in 1968 established the stature he held in foreign and Vietnamese political and social circles:

The new Minister of Information, Ton That Thien, has been described as one of the best economists and one of the most articulate and intelligent of all Vietnamese in Saigon. He has also been known as a well-informed, articulate critic of both the U.S. and G.V.N.; but he is a man of ability, energy, and patriotism, and is certainly not anti-American. He should be a very considerable improvement over his predecessor, Tran Van An, who has been ineffectual in this important post.

In 1945-1946 Thiện personally witnessed the momentous events which were to mark Viet Nam's post-war history: the overthrow of French rule by the Japanese and Emperor Bảo Đại's proclamation of the termination of the French protectorate over Viet Nam (March 1945), the formation of the first independent government of Viet Nam (April 1945), Emperor Bảo Đại's abdication in Huế (August 1945) and Ho Chi Minh's declaration of independence in Hanoi (September 1945), the arrival of the Americans and the Chinese (September 1945), the return of the French (March 1946), and the breaking out of the Franco-Vietnamese war (December 1946). He served for a year in Ho's administration before quitting upon realizing the true communist nature of the Viet-Minh United Front government headed by Ho Chi Minh. He was one of the first few non-Communist Vietnamese to perceive the August Revolution as a Leninist cover for the introduction of communism to Viet Nam as a part of a world revolution.

In 1947 he went to Europe to resume his studies. Although he distanced himself from the Ho-led Viet Minh government, he did not support the various Bảo Đại-led governments. Like many other nationalists at that time, he faced a dilemma in terms of where to direct support for Vietnamese independence. Supporting Ho would be to abet communism, and supporting Bảo Đại would be to prolong French colonialism. In his view, neither Ho nor Bảo Đại were true nationalists. As a result, he remained non-committed to either side throughout the war until Ngo Dinh Diem became Prime Minister of the State of Viet Nam in June 1954. He considered Mr. Diem a true nationalist.

Thien served as press aide to Ngo Dinh Diem, and was with him when he was overthrown in an American-condoned military coup on 1 November 1963. Despite this close and loyal association, in the aftermath of the coup he was not persecuted by the coup leaders and the post-coup governments. In 1964 he voluntarily left government service to take up journalism, working for Vietnamese as well as foreign newspapers. In 1967, he accepted a professorship at Van Hanh University in Saigon. In 1968 he served briefly as Minister of Information, during which time he enacted libertarian reforms that removed all government censorship. In the same year he was awarded the Magsaysay Award in Manila for "significant contributions" to journalism, literature and creative communication arts in Asia.

In April 1975, just before the fall of Saigon to communist forces, he went into exile in Quebec, Canada. After a university teaching career at the University of Quebec, Trois-Rivieres campus, he retired in Ottawa in 1992. He continued to write on Vietnamese social and political issues, in particular on the necessity – first advocated by Phan Chu Trinh - of making the appropriate changes in culture to enable Vietnamese to acquire the values required for rapid development, the basic condition of the advancement of the Vietnamese people.

Contrary to many educated Vietnamese, in his writings Thiện considered development to be the primary objective of Vietnam, with independence as only a secondary objective. In his view, it was this error in setting the priority of objectives, which led to the costly and lengthy wars from 1945 to 1975. He viewed these national traumas as unnecessary for the country to achieve freedom and independence, but indispensable for the Communists to secure and retain power. He held the Communist Party accountable for this development and saw the consequence as the ruin of the country, the exhaustion of its people, and the establishment of a brutal dictatorship.

Throughout the political upheavals from the 1945 August Revolution to his exile in 1975, Tôn Thất Thiện remained consistently committed to his political and nationalist convictions and active in the political discourse of South Viet Nam. After the fall of the Ngo Dinh Diem administration, he remained unattached to any political party or movement despite offers of government appointments. The Viet Nam Guardian, of which he was managing editor, maintained private ownership and an independent editorial policy.

== Early life and education: 1924–45 ==
Born on September 22, 1924, in Huế, the imperial capital of the Nguyễn dynasty, Tôn Thất Thiện was descended from a family with a long history of service to the state. His ancestry can be traced to Nguyen Bạc, a close adviser to Emperor Đinh Tiên Hoàng (r. 968-979), a founder of independent Viet Nam in the 10th century; and to Nguyễn Hoàng, founder of the Nguyễn dynasty, which ruled over most of Vietnam for almost four centuries (1600-1945). His grandfather was a military officer (born in 1835, in the reign of Emperor Minh Mạng) who served Emperor Tự Đức (1847–1883), fought against the French in Cochinchina (1860), the battle of Thuan An (1883), and the failed coup staged by Tôn Thất Thuyết against the French (1885), and ended his career as a general in the reign of Emperor Thành Thái (1889–1907). His father, Tôn Thất Quảng (1883–1972) served for thirty years in the Imperial government, rising to the rank of Minister, in charge of Rites. He retired in 1942, only three years before the end of the Vietnamese monarchy, and was thus the last but one Minister of Rites Ministry of Rites in Vietnam's long history. Thien was influenced by the Confucian philosophy followed by his father and the Buddhist beliefs of his mother.

In Huế he attended a "franco-indigène" – half-Vietnamese, half-French – elementary school, then a Catholic high school and the state-run Khải Định College. The last two establishments were "modern" schools, which eliminated Chinese script and Confucian ideas and introduced a French education standard curriculum with French as the medium of instruction. Thien was thereby introduced to Western political and social ideas, graduating with a Baccalaureate of Philosophy in 1944. Plans for medical studies in Hanoi were interrupted in March 1945 when the Japanese occupying forces took over control of the country from the French. With no other transportation available, he rode his bicycle the 400 miles from Hanoi to Huế. Along the way he witnessed the terrible effects of a famine estimated to have killed over one million Vietnamese in 1944-45. This traumatic experience convinced him to switch his course of studies from medicine to economics, under the understanding that he could thereby help more people.

== Revolution and education: 1945–55 ==
In April 1945, after the French colonial administration was ended by a Japanese coup, Emperor Bảo Đại set up the first independent government of Viet Nam led by Mr. Trần Trọng Kim. A lawyer, Phan Anh was appointed Minister of Youth and Thien served as his personal secretary. This marked Thien's first introduction to Vietnamese politics at the age of twenty-one.

After the abdication of Emperor Bảo Đại in late August 1945, on the recommendation of Mr. Ta Quang Buu, he was called to Hanoi to serve in the new Viet Minh National Front Government led by Ho Chi Minh. Fluent in English, he was posted in the Foreign Relations section of the president's office headed by Mr. Buu. The latter had been his teacher of English and rated him as the best of the class. More noteworthy still, Mr. Buu was an assistant to Võ Nguyên Giáp and had access to the top echelons of the leadership. Thien was thus placed close to the power center. This inclusion in the workings of the inner circle of the highest level of the Viet Minh leadership enabled him to observe at close quarters the core Viet Minh leadership in Hanoi, including Ho Chi Minh, Võ Nguyên Giáp, Trường Chinh, Phạm Văn Đồng as well as many of the foreign officials in Hanoi at the time, including Archimedes Patti of the U.S. Office of Strategic Services (OSS). It also allowed him to understand the Communist Party of Vietnam's manipulation of the nationalist front as a means to secure power. He was one of the first few non-Communist Vietnamese to have this understanding at that time.

Thien's work was varied. He translated and typed government documents and served as an announcer and commentator for Hanoi Radio's English language service "The Voice of Viet Nam", thereby becoming practically the first Vietnamese to address the English-speaking world. He was also a major contributor to the magazine of the Vietnamese-American Friendship Association (VAFA) launched by Ta Quang Buu and General Gallagher at a time when Ho Chi Minh was courting American support for the Viet Minh government and its continued independence from French colonial rule.

Dismissive of communist ideology from his economics studies and unable to support the radical political aims of Ho Chi Minh, which included ongoing systematic persecution of Vietnamese nationalists, he left Hanoi and returned to Huế in late 1946. In 1947, he went abroad to study. He continued to morally support the anti-French aims of the Viet Minh until 1950, when the Ho-led Viet Minh forces unreservedly turned to communist China for material and advisory support, and Ho Chi Minh publicly proclaimed Vietnam "the forward post of socialism in South-east-Asia" and the Vietnamese Communist Party re-emerged under the thin guise of the "Lao Dong" (Worker's) Party. From then on, Thien distanced himself from the Viet Minh government, remained aloof from the various political formations, and concentrated on his studies. He obtained a Bachelor of Science degree in Economics at the London School of Economics and a master's degree in Political Science at the Graduate Institute of International Studies in Geneva. He maintained his political neutrality until 1953. In October of that year, he met Mr. Ngo Dinh Diem in Paris and judged him to be a true nationalist leader. He also learned that Mr. Diem was going to be appointed by Bảo Đại as the next Prime Minister of the non-communist State of Viet Nam.

== Government service: 1954–64 ==
In May 1954, Thien joined the South Vietnamese delegation as an observer at the Geneva Conference. He then assisted at close quarters in the Vietnam-French negotiations in Paris regarding the transfer of control of major state organs to the new government. In Saigon he served as press secretary and official interpreter for Prime Minister, then President, Ngo Dinh Diem. For a brief period in 1955-1956 he went abroad, serving at the Vietnamese embassy in Paris where he got married. In the fall of 1955 he went to the U.S. where he was an instructor at Michigan State University which was initiating a major government contract to provide technical assistance to Ngo Dinh Diem's administration. Upon returning to Saigon in May 1956, he resumed his former duties. In his capacity as presidential press officer, he was the first government point of contact for American journalists reporting on the new state. He came to know almost all foreign correspondents posted in Vietnam in those years.

In October 1959, Thien returned to Geneva for doctoral studies, graduating in June 1963 with a Doctorate in Political Science. While there, he was a member of the South Vietnamese delegation to the Geneva Conference on Laos in 1961 and 1962. He returned to Saigon in mid-July 1963 as Director General of the Vietnam Press, a position he held until 1964.

As a close aide to Ngo Dinh Diem, he was with the President on 1 November 1963 when the South Vietnamese military successfully launched a coup d'état which was condoned by the U.S. government. Ton That Thien witnessed the last meeting conducted between President Diem and Ambassador Henry Cabot Lodge on the occasion of a courtesy call on the President by Admiral Harry Felt. Thien observed that the Ambassador kept the President preoccupied in discussions from 10.00 a.m. to 12.30 p.m. The coup was initiated at 01.00 p.m.

== Journalism, teaching and government service: 1964–75 ==
In August 1964 Thien left government service to take up journalism. He worked for the respected English language newspaper the Saigon Daily News, then for the Viet Nam Guardian, owned by a like-minded friend. As managing editor and columnist at both papers, he was stubbornly independent of government bias with often blunt commentary that offered constructive criticism. Vietnamese and foreign journalists were attracted by his blunt candour, convictions and independent political analysis. In December 1966 the Viet Nam Guardian was ordered by the government of Nguyễn Cao Kỳ to suspend publication for several months. Thien learned that he was on a police blacklist and at one point escaped an assassination attempt. During this time he was writing for a number of foreign publications including The Economist, and The Far Eastern Economic Review.

In 1967 he was asked by the Buddhist hierarchy to help establish a Faculty of Social Sciences at the Buddhist Van Hanh University, and was appointed Dean of that faculty, although he was known as an unrepentant close aide of the late President Diem.

In 1968, the war was brought home to Thiện personally and painfully during the "Tet" Vietnamese New Year. Both Vietnamese warring sides had agreed to observe the customary one-week holiday ceasefire. Although as a security precaution he usually avoided staying in Huế, on Tet's eve, Thiện and his elder brother Hanh flew from Saigon to visit his ailing father for a quick three-day visit. On the night of the second day, the communist forces staged a surprise general offensive and succeeded in occupying almost the entire city, including the area of Thiện's family home. As a high-profile prisoner he risked execution or captivity in the North. Fortunately, a quick counter-offensive by U.S. Marines through his area diverted his captors and he was able to escape. In later fighting in the area where Thiện's home was located, Thiện's mother, who had stayed behind, was wounded in the head by mortar shrapnel. With the central hospital still under communist occupation, and no other medical service available she died of cerebral hemorrhage and had to be buried on the spot, on the lawn of the old French Resident's office adjacent to the Huế bridge. Thien's sister-in-law, Thu Ba (Hanh's wife) risked her life to get a coffin with money given to Thiện's family by an American journalist who happened to be in the area. During the week he was stranded in Huế, he was a witness to the duplicity and brutality of the communists. After the battle it was found that up to five thousand people had been executed, many of whom had been on prepared target lists. This experience deepened his conviction that the communists could not be trusted.

In April 1968, Thien was appointed Minister of Information by Prime Minister Trần Văn Hương. His first act was to remove all censorship of the press although South Viet Nam was facing a widespread long standing insurgency and invasion from the North. In his view the country's security and freedom would be strengthened by greater freedom of expression.

In August 1968, the Philippine-based Ramon Magsaysay Award Foundation awarded him the prestigious Magsaysay Award for journalism, literature and creative communication in recognition of "his enduring commitment to free inquiry and debate." The official citation read:

Ton That Thien relentlessly has sought to digest the essence of Western scientific method and wed it to Vietnamese cultural values. Freedom of thought and expression he found were essential to this pursuit. His convictions led him to act with perceptive courage and staunch individualism as writer and editor, professor and government official.

At the end of 1968, he resigned his post after President Nguyễn Văn Thiệu twice failed to honor a pledge on a major policy issue. From 1968 to 1975 he continued to work as a journalist, newspaper editor and professor.

== Political and journalistic influences ==
Thiện's alternating roles as Presidential personal interpreter and press secretary, journalist and professor provided him with a platform for critical commentary on political events as well as the advocacy of the ideals he thought the country should uphold: traditional Confucian values which he considered to have universal and perennial value and basic to the good functioning of a society, namely: service to community, respect of traditions, honesty and faithfulness to recognized and honourable freely elected leaders.

These roles also gave him reason for official or unofficial contact with a who's who of historic figures in that period of Viet Nam's history. These included, among government and political officials: Major Archimedes Patti, Edward Lansdale, Wesley Fishel, Wolfe Ladejinsky, Ted Serong, William Colby, Chester Cooper, Daniel Ellsberg, Douglas Pike, John Mecklin, Barry Zorthian, Ambassador Henry Cabot Lodge, Ambassador Ellsworth Bunker, Secretary of Defense Robert McNamara, General William Westmoreland, Dr. Tom Dooley and Senator Mike Mansfield. In 1965 Don Luce, the International Voluntary Services (IVS) field director arranged a private meeting with Senator Edward Kennedy during a fact-finding trip to Viet Nam.

Among journalists he knew or met virtually the whole range of the Saigon foreign press corps over the course of twenty years, from 1954 to 1975. He often served as a respected source of information and insight on Vietnamese cultural sensibilities and political traditions. His press contacts included: Stanley Karnow, Robert Shaplen, Homer Bigart, Sol Sanders, Keyes Beech, Bernard Kalb, David Halberstam, Malcom Browne, Charles Mohr, Neil Sheehan, Denis Warner, Peter Arnett, Joel Blocker, François Sully, Ward Just, Marguerite Higgins, Frances FitzGerald, Beverly Deepe, Elisabeth Pond, R. W. Apple, Don Oberdorfer, William Tuohy, Arthur Dommen, Michael Field, Bernard Crozier, Bernard Fall, Olivier Todd, Richard Gwynn, Max Clos, and François Nivolon.

He also was consulted by or became friends with several leading academics, including Joseph Buttinger, Gerald Hickey, Patrick J. Honey, Denis Duncanson and George Tanham.

== Exile in Canada: 1975–2014 ==
Thien believed that without the leadership of President Diem, South Vietnam would be doomed and this conviction remained with him following the 1963 coup d'état. By early 1975 as it became apparent that the anti-communist South's fall was inevitable, he knew too well that under communist rule a normal life, particularly one of independent political discourse, would be impossible. Communist practice would require him to write a "confession" stating that he had betrayed his country and his people, and this was an act he could not accept. Due to his political background his daughter would not be allowed to access high school or university. He would have to undergo "socialist re-education" and would be barred from his journalism and teaching professions. Although assured by a man known to have connections with Hanoi that he would be "welcomed by the Revolution", the painful memories of Tet 1968 in Huế were still fresh in his mind and he made plans for an emergency evacuation. At the same time, he felt it was his duty to fight on to keep South Vietnam free as long as possible and remained until the Fall of Saigon was imminent.

As the communist forces closed in on Saigon, Thien put his escape plan into effect: with the help of a foreign friend, he smuggled his family out of Vietnam to Paris.

There, thanks to the connections of a brother-in-law, he was able to get asylum.

The husband of a sister of his wife, who had settled in Canada, happened to be in Paris at that time and urged him to move there. Fluent in both French and English, with a good educational background and a great deal of professional experience, he had no difficulty finding employment and settling down in his new country.

Thiện became a professor in linguistics at the Université du Québec à Trois-Rivières.

In these years he travelled extensively to academic conferences in Europe, Thailand, Singapore, Malaysia, Indonesia, Taiwan, China, the USSR, and Australia.

He also served as a visiting professor at the Graduate Institute of International Studies in Geneva, and a senior visiting fellow at the U.S. Naval War College in Newport, Rhode Island.

In 1989 he wrote The Foreign Politics of the Communist Party of Vietnam: A Study of Communist Tactics, published by Crane Russak, New York.

In 1990, a monograph was published in Singapore by the Information and Resource Centre titled "Ho Chi Minh a Nationalist? Ho Chi Minh and the Comintern". BBC Radio service occasionally invited him to make comments in the 1980s and 1990s as did BBC television for a documentary on Ho Chi Minh.

In 1992, Thiện retired in Ottawa and continued to write articles on Vietnamese affairs for Vietnamese newspapers abroad.

In 2014, shortly before his death, he became a founding member of Vietnam Veterans for Factual History.

== Parallel life to Bùi Tín ==
It is historically intriguing to compare Tôn Thất Thiện's life history with that of Bùi Tín, Thien's neighbour, who also grew up in Huế, and whose father was also a Minister in the Imperial cabinet of Emperor Bảo Đại.

In August 1945, they both went to Hanoi. While Thien served in the office of the President, the younger Bui Tin joined the Viet Minh as a soldier in the first unit of the newly formed army and at one point served as a guard at the presidential office in which Thien worked.

Bùi Tín went on to serve the communist regime in the north of Vietnam as journalist, writer, and government officer, much as Ton That Thien was serving in the south.

For thirty years, they served on opposing sides of the communist North – nationalist South political division of the country.

When their life histories are considered together it is evident they singly or jointly were present at all of the major political and historic events of Vietnam's tumultuous history.

They were both present at the Proclamation of Independence of the Democratic Republic of Vietnam in Hanoi on 2 September, 1945, and narrowly missed meeting again upon the Fall of Saigon on April 30, 1975, at which Bùi Tín took the surrender of Dương Văn Minh, then President of South Vietnam. Thien had departed shortly before.

While Tôn Thất Thiện came to recognize and reject the aims of the Communist Party-led Viet Minh in early 1946, Bùi Tín did not begin to question Party orthodoxy until after the unification under communist rule in 1975.

When he claimed asylum in France in 1990 his life's path once again became conjoined with that of Ton That Thien in their common experience of exile and their shared political beliefs in multi-party democracy, individual freedoms and traditional cultural values.

== Personal life ==
In his personal life Thiện followed the Confucianist-Western modernism, which he adopted in his public life. In founding a family, he married a person with a clear Confucian background, Lệ Vân (Lovely Cloud), whose great-grandfather was the Confucian scholar and mandarin Nguyen Trong Hiep. Assigned by the emperor to negotiate with France after French troops had occupied the Imperial capital of Huế in 1883, he persuaded the French not to abolish the Nguyễn monarchy and annex Vietnam, but to accept it as a protectorate instead. Lệ Vân's grandmother was the daughter of a well-known poet, Cao Thi Ngoc Anh, herself daughter of a Confucian scholar, Cao Xuân Dục, known as a great Minister of Education in the Imperial Government of Vietnam, a contemporary of Nguyen Trong Hiep.

Unlike many young women of her generation, Lệ Vân not only went to college, but was also allowed to travel to France for further study. Another "modern" side to this marriage: neither Thien nor Lệ Vân sought prior permission from their parents before their engagement. Another infringement of traditions was that they got married in Paris, in a simple ceremony with a small attendance instead of an elaborate and lavish wedding party involving a large gathering presided by the parents surrounded by all members of the two families. When their daughter was born, they usurped their parents' traditional prerogative by naming her themselves, Thuỳ Lan (Sweet Orchid).

Professor Tôn Thất Thiện died peacefully at home in Ottawa, Canada, surrounded by his family on October 3, 2014.

== Publications ==
Books by Ton That Thien:

- India and South East Asia: 1947-1960. A Study of India's Foreign Policy towards the South East Asian Countries in the Period 1947-1960, Geneva, Droz, 1963, 385 pages
- "The War in Vietnam" in Sibnarayan Ray (ed.), Vietnam Seen From East and West, Melbourne, Thomas Nelson, 1966.
- Ton That Thien and Reinhold Wepf (eds.) Vietnam, Vom Mekongdelta zum Song Ben Hai, Bern, Kimmerly and Frey, 1968
- The Foreign Politics of The Communist Party of Vietnam: A Study in Communist Tactics, Crane Russak, New York, 1989, 255 pages
- Was Ho Chi Minh a Nationalist? Ho Chi Minh and the Comintern Information and Resource Centre, Singapore, 1990

Articles by Ton That Thien:

- "The Geneva Agreements and Peace Prospects in Vietnam", India Quarterly, October–December 1956.
- "Vietnam: A Case of Social Alienation", International Affairs (London), July 1967.
- "Neutralism in South East Asia" (Paper presented to the 7th World Congress of the International Political Science Association, Brussels, September 1967).
- "Ho Chi Minh, Vietnam's First Communist", The Asia Magazine (Singapore), March 10, 1968.
- "The Search for a New Identity: Vietnam Reaction to Western Impact" (Paper presented to a Panel on Asia, East-West Center, Honolulu, June 1968), Van Hanh Bulletin, Van Hanh University, Saigon, December 1969.
- "Vietnam: Winner Takes Nothing", Orientations, (Hong Kong), January 1970.
- "Saigon: A Tormented City Fighting Hard to Survive", Orientations (Hong Kong), August 1970.
- "Understanding the War in Vietnam", India Quarterly, July–September 1970.
- "Social Mobilization and Political Participation: The Vietnamese Experience", (Paper read at the Academic Conference on 'Development in South East Asia: Issues and Dilemmas', 26–29 October 1971, Hong Kong, under the auspices of ASAIHL).
- "Asia's Longest War", The Asian (Hong Kong), November 28 – December 4, 1971.
- "Technology, the Social Sciences, Education and the Future of Vietnam", ASAIHL, Hong Kong, Newsletter, December 1971.
- "Phan Chu Trinh, or Where to Begin a Revolution", Van Hanh Bulletin, Van Hanh University, Saigon, March–April 1970.
- "The Supremacy of Human Freedom, or Buddhism, and Science and Technology", Graduation Address, Van Hanh University, Saigon, February 1972.
- "Higher Education in a Transitional Country Plagued by Colonialism and War: The Case of Vietnam", paper prepared for RIHED Bulletin, Singapore, July 1972.
- "The Modernization Dream: Where One Should Tread Softly", paper prepared for the Third International Conference on the Modernization of Asia, Penang, Malaysia, September 3–9, 1972.
- "The Relevance of Existing Social Science Theories and Concepts for South East Asia", paper prepared for the Second Academic Conference on Social Science Research for Urban Development in South East Asia, Bangkok, Thailand, December 18–23, 1972.
- "War is Peace", Orientations, Hong Kong, August–October 1973.
- "L'Asie dans l'après-guerre" in Hommes d'État Célèbres, Éditions d'Art Lucien Mazenod, Paris, 1977
- "Ho Chi Minh", dans Hommes d'Etat Célèbres, Éditions d'Art Lucien Mazenod, Paris, 1977
- "Politics and Economic Development", paper prepared for the Conference on Problems of Development in Asia, organised by the Center of Asian Studies, University of Hong Kong, April 7–9, 1975
- "Vietnam, 1975-1980: Reflections on a Revolution", Contemporary Southeast Asia, Vol.2, No. 2, September 1980
- "Negotiation Strategy and Tactics of the Vietnamese Communists", Negotiations in Asia, Centre for Applied Studies in International Negotiations, Geneva, 1984
- "Southeast Asia's Post Cold War Geopolitics: The New Realities", in Global Affairs, Winter, 1993
- "Luan Ban ve Tu Tuong Ho Chi Minh", (On Ho Chi Minh's Thoughts), June 1996
- "New Alignments, New Realities: East Asia in the Post-Cold War Setting" World Affairs, Jan-Mar, 1997, Vol. 1, No.1
- "The Year of the Hare: New Light on the Anti-Diem Coup", in World Affairs, Vol. 3, No. 4, October–December 1999
- "Shadows and Wind in Vietnam", Ngay Nay, Houston, 1 December 2000
- "Sober Thoughts on April 30: The South Vietnam Liberation Front and Hanoi Myth and Reality" 29 April 2000. Presentation at the national conference organized by the Vietnamese Canadian Federation in Ottawa, "The arrival of Vietnamese refugees in Canada: What have we learned?"
- "Cultural Issues in Vietnam's Transition" in The Vietnamese Economy and its Transformation to an Open Market System. Wm. T. Alpert (ed.). M.E. Sharpe, New York, 2005
