= Thomas Sanders =

Thomas or Tom Sanders may refer to:

== Sports ==
- Thomas Sanders (cricketer) (1809–1852), American cricketer
- Thomas Sanders (American football) (born 1962), American football player
- Tommy Sanders (born 1954), German sportscaster
- Tom Sanders (rugby union) (born 1994), New Zealand rugby union player
- Satch Sanders (Thomas Ernest Sanders, born 1938), American basketball player and coach

== Other ==
- Thomas Sanders (Quebec politician) (1836–1874), Canadian merchant and politician
- Thomas Sanders (MP) (1610–1695), English politician and military officer
- Thomas A. Sanders (1889-1946), American real estate developer and politician from Maine
- Thomas E. Sanders (1953–2017), production designer
- Thomas K. Sanders (1932–2011), American bridge player
- Thomas Sanders (entertainer) (born 1989), American Viner and YouTuber
- Tom Sanders (mathematician) (active 2007), English mathematician
- Thomas Charles Sanders (1904–1967), English actor
- Thomas Steven Sanders (born 1957), American convinced murderer

== See also ==
- Tom Sandars (born 1976), British radio newsreader
