= Senator Sanders (disambiguation) =

Bernie Sanders (born 1941) is a United States Senator from Vermont since 2007 and a Democratic presidential candidate.

Senator Sanders may also refer to:

== Members of the United States Senate ==
- Newell Sanders (1850–1938), U.S. Senator from Tennessee from 1912 to 1913
- Wilbur F. Sanders (1834–1905), U.S. Senator from Montana from 1890 to 1893

== United States state senate members ==
- Archie D. Sanders (1857–1941), New York State Senate
- Carl Sanders (1925–2014), Georgia State Senate
- David J. Sanders (born 1975), Arkansas State Senate
- Henry Sanders (politician) (born 1942), Alabama State Senate
- Jared Y. Sanders Jr. (1892–1960), Louisiana State Senate
- Richie Sanders (born 1963), Kentucky State Senate

== See also ==
- Senator Saunders (disambiguation)
