= Ed Sanders (disambiguation) =

Ed Sanders is a poet, singer, social activist, environmentalist, novelist and publisher.

Edward or Ed Sanders may also refer to:

- Ed Sanders (TV personality) (born 1968), carpenter who appears in Extreme Makeover: Home Edition
- Ed Sanders (boxer) (1930–1954), Olympic gold medalist in boxing
- Ed Sanders (actor) (born 1993), English actor, singer and record producer
- Edward Sanders (politician) (1888–1943), member of the New South Wales Legislative Assembly
- E. P. Sanders (1937–2022), New Testament scholar
- The original name given to the fictional character Winnie-the-Pooh
