= Tim Sanders =

Tim Sanders may refer to:

- Tim Sanders (writer) (born 1961), American author, public speaker, and former Yahoo! executive
- Tim Sanders (footballer) (born 1986), Dutch footballer
- Tim Sanders (politician) (born 1982), American politician in the Minnesota House of Representatives
- Tim Sanders (filmmaker), New Zealand filmmaker
