= George Saunders (footballer, born 1918) =

English footballer

Personal information
- Date of birth: 1 March 1918
- Place of birth: Birkenhead, England
- Date of death: 1985 (aged 66–67)
- Position: Full back

Senior career*
Years	Team	Apps	(Gls)
1946–1952	Everton	133	(0)
- * Club domestic league appearances and goals

George Saunders (1 March 1918 – 1982) was an English footballer who played in the Football League for Everton.
