= Sol Sanders =

American journalist (1926–2022)

Sol Witner Sanders (1926 – February 17, 2022) was an American journalist specializing in Asia with more than twenty-five years in the region. He was a former correspondent for Business Week, U.S. News & World Report and United Press International. He traveled extensively in Mexico during the 1950s and was a correspondent in Vietnam in the 1960s. In 1967–1968, Sanders held the Edward R. Murrow Press Fellowship at the Council on Foreign Relations. Until his death, he continued to write weekly columns for World Tribune.com and East-Asia-Intel.com. In latter years, he lived in New York City and in Hawaii, where he was a scholar at the East–West Center.

== Accomplishments ==
Sanders was born in Atlanta and attended public schools in North Carolina and the University of North Carolina at Chapel Hill. He left college to enlist in the United States Foreign Service and served as an ambulance driver with the British Central Mediterranean Forces before transferring to the India-Burma theatre. He ultimately earned a bachelor's degree in Journalism from the University of Missouri, attended the Far East Institute at Columbia University and Sorbonne University in Paris. He spoke English, French and Spanish and some German and Japanese.

He was a Fellow at the Council on Foreign Relations; held numerous part-time consultancies: The Ford Foundation, The William H. Donner Foundation; senior adviser, Info Plus, Inc., a Tokyo-based Japanese consulting firm; visiting professor, The Fletcher School of Law & Diplomacy at Tufts University, adjunct professor of journalism, Hofstra University, Consultant, The East–West Center, Honolulu; adjunct professor of journalism, Florida Atlantic University; contract research/writing, Booz Allen Hamilton, for Office of Net Assessment, Department of Defense, The Pentagon.

He was deputy foreign editor for Business Week (1953). He was Asian Editor for McGraw-Hill World News (1957–1961) and editor for U.S. News & World Report (1961–1970), reporting on the Vietnam War. He wrote articles for the Research Institute of America Report (1973–1977), Business Week magazine (1977–1986) and the Washington Times (1987–2019) and was a founding member of Vietnam Veterans for Factual History.

He maintained a website where he continued to post articles about world affairs until his retirement in 2019.

== List of Published Books ==
- A Sense of Asia (1969)
- Arc of Free Asia: a Look into the 1970s at U.S. Problems and Responsibilities (1969)
- Honda: The Man and His Machines (1975)
- Costa Rican Laboratory (1986)
- Mexico: Chaos on Our Doorstep (1989)
- Living off the West: Gorbachev's Secret Agenda and Why it Will Fail (1990)
- U.S. role in the Asian century: a Panel of Experts Looks at National Interest in the New Environment (1997)
- Mitsubishi Electric: The Challenge of Globalization (1998)
- People! Vignettes Gathered Along The Way Through A Long Life (2015)

== See also ==
- Tôn Thất Thiện
- Vietnam War
