= Justice Sanders =

Justice Sanders may refer to:

- Joe W. Sanders (1915–1994), associate justice of the Louisiana Supreme Court
- John Adams Sanders (1866–1948), associate justice of the Supreme Court of Nevada
- Joseph M. Sanders (1866–1927), associate justice of the Supreme Court of Appeals of West Virginia
- Richard B. Sanders (fl. 1970s–2010s), associate justice of the Washington State Supreme Court
