= James Sanders =

James Sanders may refer to:

== Sports ==
- James Sanders (American football) (born 1983), American football safety
- Twiggy Sanders (James Sanders), member of the Harlem Globetrotters
- Jimmy Sanders (footballer) (1920–2003), English goalkeeper, mostly for West Bromwich Albion
- Jimmy Sanders (baseball) (1902–1975), minor league baseball player and manager
- Jim Sanders (footballer) (1932–2007), English footballer, mostly for Crystal Palace and Exeter
- Jim Sanders (rugby league) (1900–1981), New Zealand international

== Politicians ==
- James Sanders Jr. (born 1957), New York State Senator, 2013-
- James Sanders Holman (1804–1867), first mayor of Houston, Texas

== Others ==
- James Sanders (architect) (born 1955), architect, designer, and writer in New York City
- James Sanders (RAF officer) (1914–2002), British flying ace of the Second World War
- James A. Sanders (1927–2020), Biblical scholar
- James C. Sanders (1926–2018), American businessman and administrator of the Small Business Administration
- Murder of James Sanders, murdered while showing a diamond ring that was listed for sale in Craigslist
- Speed Demon (Marvel Comics), also known as James Sanders, a Marvel Comics character

== See also ==
- James Saunders (disambiguation)
