= David Sanders =

David Sanders may refer to:

- William David Sanders (1951–1999), known as Dave Sanders, teacher killed during the Columbine High School massacre
- David Sanders (baseball) (born 1979), baseball pitcher
- David Sanders (biologist), associate professor of biological sciences at Purdue University
- David Sanders (cyclist), Australian cyclist and cycling coach
- David J. Sanders (born 1975), member of the Arkansas State Senate
- David Sanders, the captain of FedEx Flight 705
- Davy Sanders, character in Alabama Moon
