= James Saunders (footballer) =

English footballer

Personal information
- Full name: James Edward Saunders
- Place of birth: Birmingham, England
- Height: 5 ft 9 in (1.75 m)
- Position: Goalkeeper

Senior career*
Years	Team	Apps	(Gls)
1900	Glossop	1	(0)
1901	Middlesbrough	0	(0)
1901–1905	Manchester United	12	(0)
1905–1906	Nelson		
1906–1909	Lincoln City (Note: The infobox statistics for Lincoln City include 65 appearances in the Football League in the 1906–07 and 1907–08 seasons, and 38 appearances in the Midland League in 1908–09.)	103	(0)
1909–1910	Chelsea	2	(0)
1910	Watford	4	(0)
1910–?	Lincoln Liberal Club		
- * Club domestic league appearances and goals

James Edward Saunders was an English footballer who played as a goalkeeper. He played in the Football League for Glossop, Manchester United, Lincoln City and Chelsea, and also appeared for Middlesbrough, Nelson and Watford. He was born in Birmingham.
