= Paul Sanders =

Paul Sanders may refer to:

- Paul Sanders (athlete) (born 1962), British sprinter
- Paul Sanders (historian) (born 1967), British historian
- Paul Sanders (politician) (born c. 1927), American politician
