= Donald Mainland =

Scottish medical statistician (1902–1985)

Donald Mainland FRSE FRSC (Born Darwen, 5 April 1902- died Kent, Connecticut July 1985) was an English-born medical statistician who became a Professor at the New York University. He is remembered for his series of Mainland's Notes.

== Life ==
Mainland was born in Lancashire, northern England, in 1902. He studied medicine at the University of Edinburgh, graduating with an MB, ChB. In 1927, he won the Gunning Victoria Jubilee Prize in Anatomy for his essay, “The pluriovular follicle, with special reference to its occurrence in the ferret”. And in 1931, Edinburgh University awarded him a DSc. He was a lecturer in anatomy at the University of Edinburgh and was elected a Fellow of the Royal Society of Edinburgh in 1938. His proposers were Ernest Cruickshank, James Couper Brash, Alfred Joseph Clark and Ivan De Burgh Daly. In 1954, he was named a Fellow of the American Statistical Association. He resigned from the Royal Society of Edinburgh in 1965.

In 1949, he emigrated to Nova Scotia to take on the role of Professor of Anatomy at Dalhousie University. His personality clashed with his junior colleague, Dr Richard Holbourne Saunders (who then replaced him) and one year later he was appointed Professor of Biostatics in the Department of Preventative Medicine at the Bellevue Hospital Medical College, New York City, United States. In 1953, he moved to the Department of Medical Statistics as its Chairman.

== Publications ==
- Mainland's Notes from a Laboratory of Medical Statistics
- Mainland's Statistical Ward Rounds
- Mainland's Notes on Biometry in Medical Research
- Mainland's Elementary Medical Statistics' (1952)
- Statistical Tables for Use in Binomial Samples
