= Michael Sinclair Sanders =

British archaeologist (born 1939)

Michael Sinclair Sanders (born 1939) is a British amateur archaeologist. He is known for having searched for famous biblical sites, such as Sodom and Gomorrah, and famous objects, like the Lost Ark of the Covenant.
