= Scott Sanders (attorney) =

America attorney

- Born: Scott Loren Sanders; October 6, 1966 (age 58)
- Education: University of Wisconsin–Madison; Emory University (J.D.)
- Occupation: Lawyer

Scott Loren Sanders (born October 6, 1966) is an American criminal defense lawyer and an advocate for both criminal justice and police reform.

== Early life and education ==
Sanders grew up in the Chicago, Illinois area. He went on to receive an undergraduate degree at the University of Wisconsin and attended Emory University School of Law in Atlanta.

== Legal career ==
Sanders has worked in the Orange County Public Defender's office since the 1990s. Sanders has handled several high-profile cases in the office.

=== Jail house informant scandal ===
He was appointed to represent Scott Dekraai who was accused of killing eight people in the 2011 Seal Beach shooting. During the course of representing Dekraii, Sanders uncovered that prosecutors from the Orange County District Attorney's Office and law enforcement agencies used jailhouse informants to build their cases against defendants, but they would withhold that evidence from defense attorneys. He learned that informants received reduced sentences or cash for getting other defendants to reveal incriminating evidence.

After Sanders uncovered the secret practice, the Orange County District Attorney's Office was removed from the case following a ruling by Judge Thomas Goethals that the office had violated Dekraai's rights by improperly withholding evidence from the defense. Goethals assigned California Attorney General Kamala Harris to take over the prosecution. Harris's office announced its intention to appeal the decision, which was ultimately denied. Several murder and attempted murder cases have unraveled since Sanders unearthed the secret practices. In August 2017, Goethals ruled that Dekraai was ineligible to receive the death penalty due to the purported prosecutorial misconduct in the case. Dekraai was sentenced to eight terms of life imprisonment without parole and one term of seven years to life for attempted murder.

Sanders claimed California Attorney General Xavier Becerra and United States Attorney General Jeff Sessions have turned a blind eye to the use of jailhouse informants. Sanders discovered that more than 140 cases might have been mishandled due to the use of jailhouse informants. Sanders claimed that it is the largest jailhouse informant scandal in United States history.
