= Richard Sanders (writer) =

American novelist (born 1949)

Richard Louis Sanders (born July 14, 1949) is a former Executive Editor of Entertainment Weekly and People magazines and the author of a series of character-driven thrillers. While the novels are designed as entertainment, with large dollops of humor, they deal with such serious issues as addiction, depression, despair and, concomitantly, spiritual renewal and redemption—all subjects close to Sanders’ life.

== Magazines ==
His career in magazines began in 1978, when he became an Associate Editor at Us Magazine, a then year-old publication started by The New York Times Company as a competitor to the successful, recently launched People. Sanders was the Features Editor by the time he left Us in 1985.

He joined People as a Senior Writer in 1985, specializing in entertainment coverage and had been promoted to Senior Editor by the time he left in 1991.

He transferred to another magazine in the Time Inc. stable, Entertainment Weekly, joining the publication as a Senior Editor during its formative, groundbreaking years, when it won three ASME General Excellence Awards. Sanders had been promoted to Assistant Managing Editor and Executive Editor by the time he returned to People in 2002.

During his second stint at People, which lasted until 2008, his duties as Executive Editor included leading the magazine's 300 reporters and correspondents as News Director, editing and overseeing the People books division and running people.com.

== Books ==
His books, in order of publication, include:

Sex Death Dream Talk

The Dead Have A Thousand Dreams

Tell No Lie, We Watched Her Die

The Lower Manhattan Book of The Dead

The Seventh Compass Point Of Death

"Dead Line"

"Dead Heat"

The novels vary widely in subject matter, from deadly scams in Hollywood to terrorist plots in New York, but they are united by thematic consistency. Characters are addicted, in one form or another, to power, money, obsession, drugs, alcohol, rage or revenge, and resolution can only be attained through love, faith and self-release. Sanders has written and spoken extensively about his own experiences with dropping LSD, injecting crystal methamphetamine and struggling with alcoholism. As he says in the biographical entry to Sex Death Dream Talk, “I often speak to young journalists and try to use myself as an example for inspiration—a guy who spent time in jail, rehab and a psych ward and somehow went on to become a successful editor…and managed to keep himself sane and alive. I’ve tried to reflect those experiences in these books.”

== Interviews & Bio Articles ==
Dancing With Death

How I Kicked Drugs By Writing

Bookpleasures interview

Indie Book Lounge interview

Freelance and Fiction interview

Free Book Reviews interview

ACMP interview
