= General Sanders =

General Sanders may refer to:

- John C. C. Sanders (1840–1864), Confederate States Army brigadier general
- Patrick Sanders (British Army officer) (born 1966), British Army general
- Richard C. Sanders (1915–1976), U.S. Air Force brigadier general
- William P. Sanders (1833–1863), Union Army brigadier general (unconfirmed)

== See also ==
- Erwin Sander (1892–1962), German Wehrmacht lieutenant general
- Mary Saunders (fl. 1970s–2000s), U.S. Air Force major general
- Otto Liman von Sanders (1855−1929), German and Ottoman general
