= James Saunders (dancer) =

American dancer

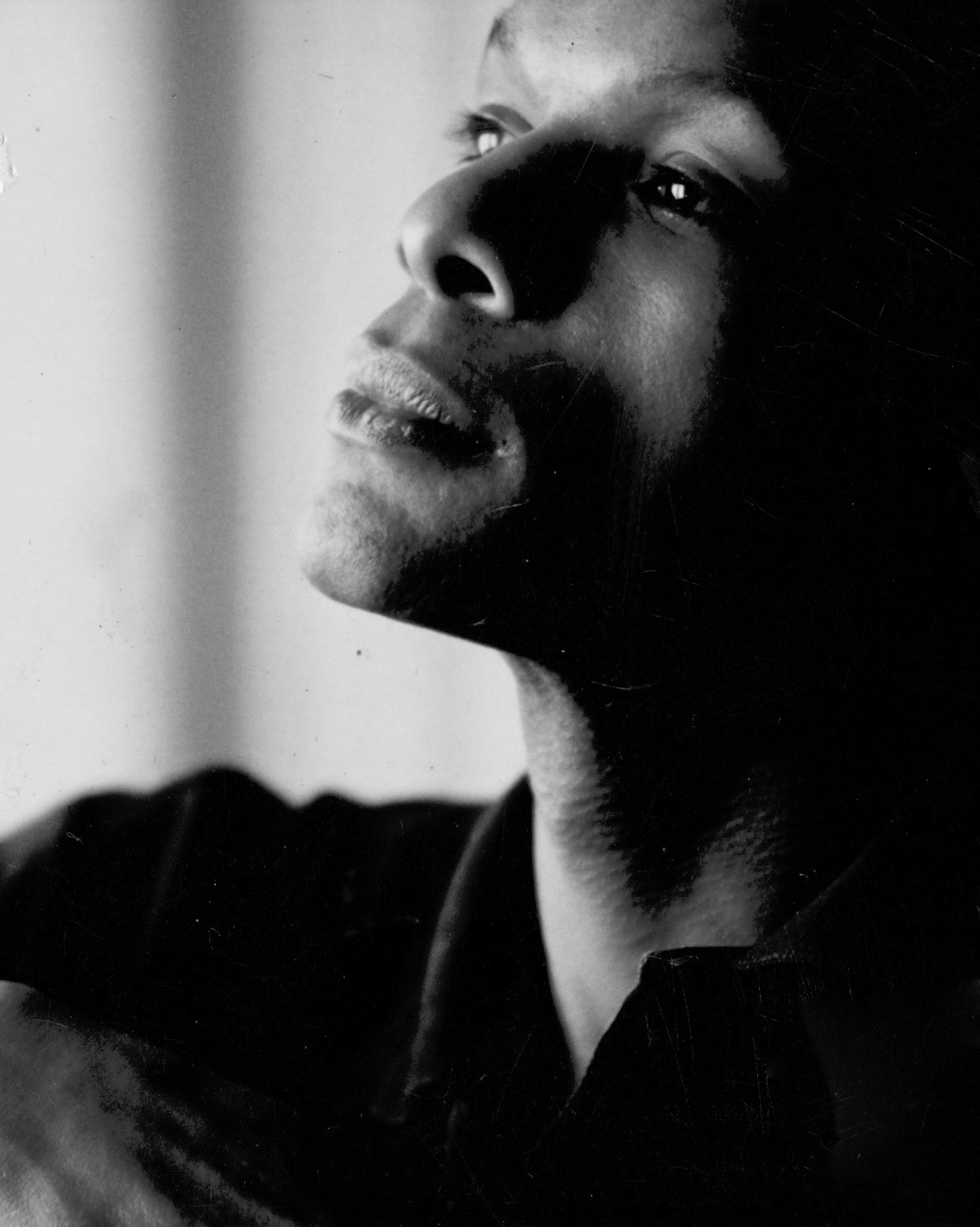
James Saunders

James Saunders (14 July 1946 in Wilmington, Delaware – 24 August 1996 in Cologne, Germany) was an American dancer, choreographer and movement teacher.

== Personal life ==
Born and raised as the son of Mary Lee and Major Saunders in Wilmington, Delaware, Saunders studied painting and sculpture at the Philadelphia College of Art (bachelor's degree). In 1968, at the age of 22, Saunders took his first dance class. and studied thereafter ballet with the Pennsylvania Ballet Company under the teachers Benjamin Harkavy, Edward Caton and Manuel Héctor Zaraspe. He was later a student of Irene Bartos, Rosella Hightower and Anna Price. In 1973 Saunders left the United States and settled in Europe. Saunders had a fatal accident on August 24, 1996, during the performance "Basstanz - Bilderwelten" which he performed with the musician Enrique Dias in the Museum Ludwig in Cologne. Saunders is buried at Gracelawn Memorial Park cemetery in Wilmington, Delaware.

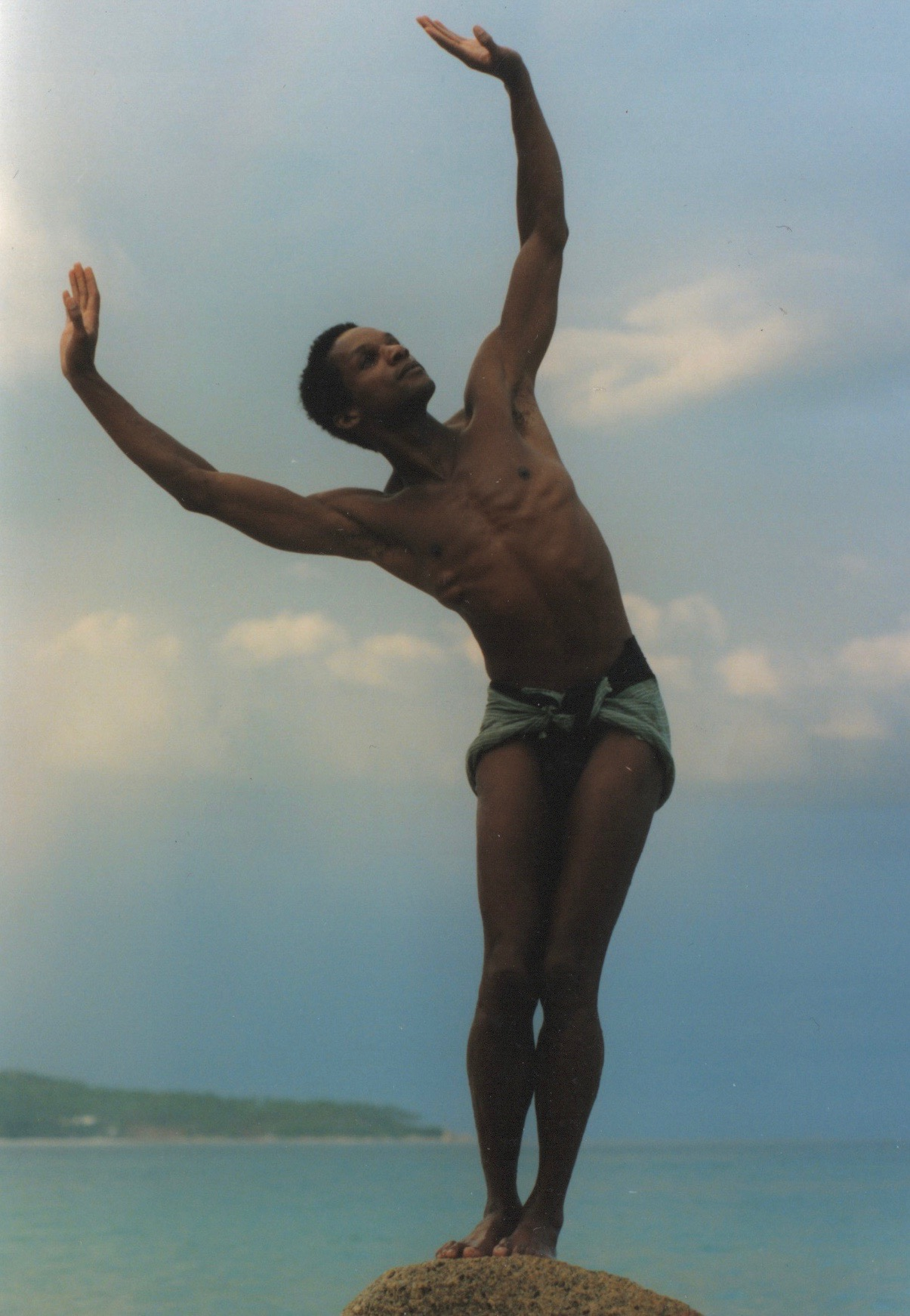
James Saunders, 1986 Koh Samui, Thailand

== Career ==
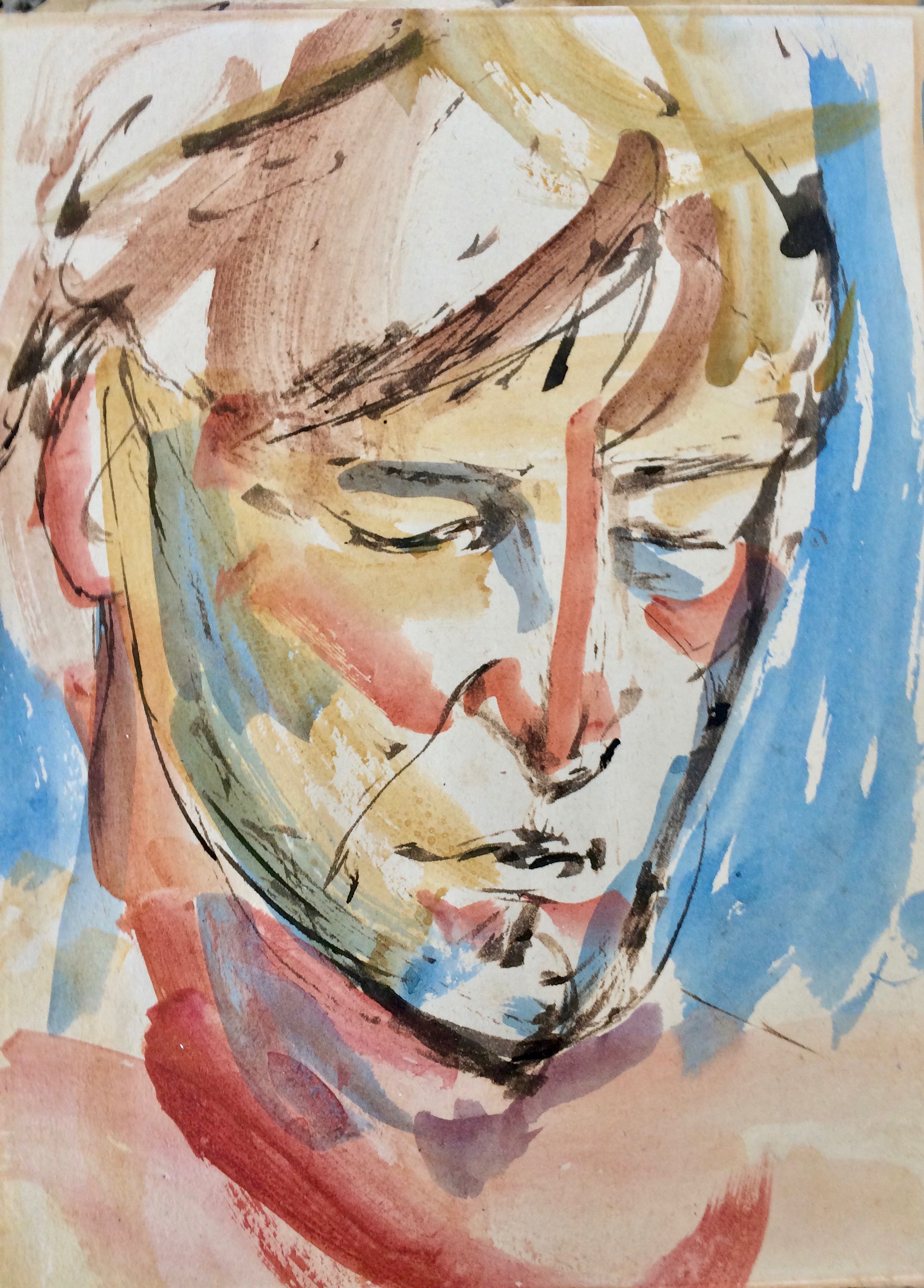
Watercolor by James Saunders: Portrait of Kajo Nelles, 1986

Saunders was a member of the Pennsylvania Ballet (1972–1973), in Maurice Béjart's Ballet des XX. Century (1973), in the Tanz-Forum Cologne (1973–1977) and most recently in his dance cariere first soloist in the Frankfurt Ballet (1977–1980). He has danced leading roles in works by George Balanchine, Hans van Manen, Heinz Spoerli, Glen Tetley, Christopher Bruce and Talley Beatty.

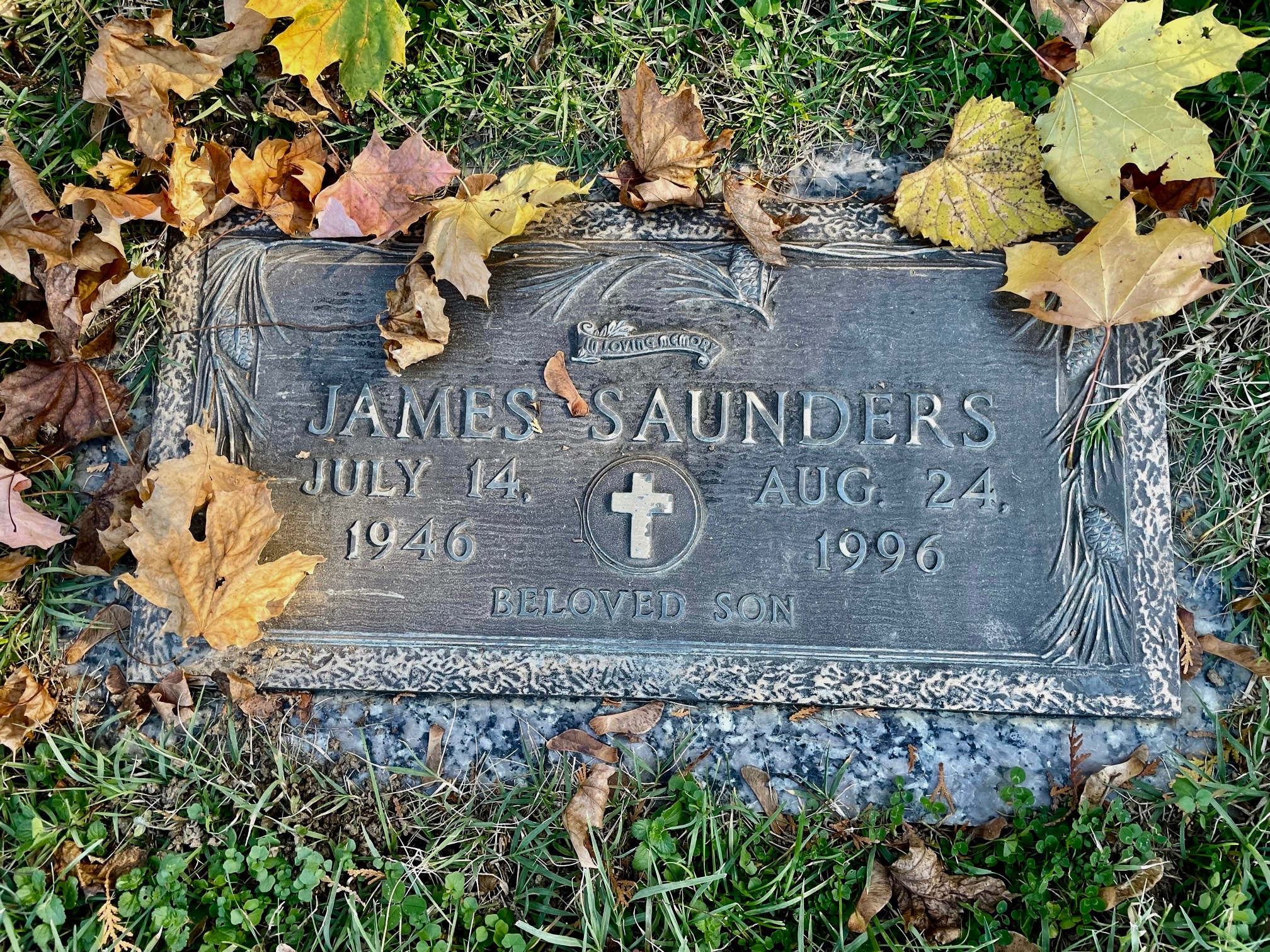
Tombstone on Gracelawn Memorial Park, Wilmington DE

After further educational training with Gabriela Taub Darvash in New York, James Saunders ended his solo career in 1980 and worked as a visiting professor at the Darvash School in New York. In the early 1980s he became artistic director of the Deutsche Ballett-Bühne e.V., the founding association of Ballet International magazine. In 1984 he founded the Tanzprojekte Cologne with Christiane Ruff and Kajo Nelles - Creativity through Movement. He brought amateurs with dancers and choreographers together on stage and worked with his holistic approach to art: everyone is a dancer, a mover. Thousands of people participated in those projects from 1984 to 1994. From 1985 to 1991 he directed his own dance training projects in-house, which contributed significantly to the development of a lively dance scene in Germany. From 1989 to 1994 he carried out the Creating Movement Projects in Johannesburg and Soweto a long-term project supporting young leaders in the field of art. This was the first cultural project in southern Africa sponsored by the Goethe Institute. Beside his regularly teachings in his own studio (Tanzprojekte Köln) Saunders taught at Dance Institutes in Johannesburg, Soweto, New York, Jerusalem, Osaka, Arnhem, Vienna and he developed Solo works for himself and for dance colleagues. 1992 he became a member of the Board of Advisers of the "Soweto Community Dance Project". Saunders developed the "Body as Heart" exercises; a preparatory exercise series for dance training. After his death, BMW South Africa donated a scholarship for young African dance talents.

Since autumn 2024, an initiative has been campaigning for the renaming of Wissmann Street in Cologne to James Saunders Street. The scientific committee did not follow the initiative with the most supporters of all submitted name proposals because women were prioritized in the naming process.

The Wim Wenders Foundation is awarding a scholarship to the young artists Hildegard Alina Oehler (NRW) and Valerie-Malin Schmid (Bavaria) for research into their experimental documentary film "Echoes of Movement" about the dancer James Saunders.

== Awards ==
In 1996, he received the Cologne Dance Theater Prize from the SK-Stiftung Kultur, Cologne, for his life's work post mortem, which was accepted by his partner Kajo Nelles.

== Selected works ==
- The unanswered question (1976)
- Animus (with a composition of Volker Blumenthaler, 1977)
- Horla (with Ilka Doubek 1979)
- Birds (with members of the Ballet Basel, 1980)
- Songs, 1991
- Aura (with body sculptures of Noam ben Jacov, 1991)
- Eye (with sculpture of Martin Schilken, 1994)
- Wanderer - Spaces like Home (with a composition of Mashiro Miwa)
- Basstanz ( with the musicians Jean-Claude Jones, Nicolaus Hoffmann, Enrique Dias and Peter Kowald, 1995/96)
- Observation Suite, 1996
