= George Sanders (disambiguation) =

George Sanders (1906–1972) was a British actor.

George Sanders may also refer to:

- George Sanders (painter) (1774–1846), Scottish portrait painter
- George Sanders (VC) (1894–1950), Victoria Cross recipient in World War I
- George Nicholas Sanders (1812–1873), American official suspected in the assassination of Abraham Lincoln
- George Harold Sanders, American musician

== See also ==
- George Sandars (1805–1879), British Conservative politician
- George Saunders (disambiguation)
