= Eric Sanders =

Eric Sanders may refer to:

- Eric Sanders (offensive lineman) (born 1958), guard and tackle in the National Football League
- Eric Sanders (American football coach), American football coach
