= Ted Sanders (writer) =

American writer (born 1969)

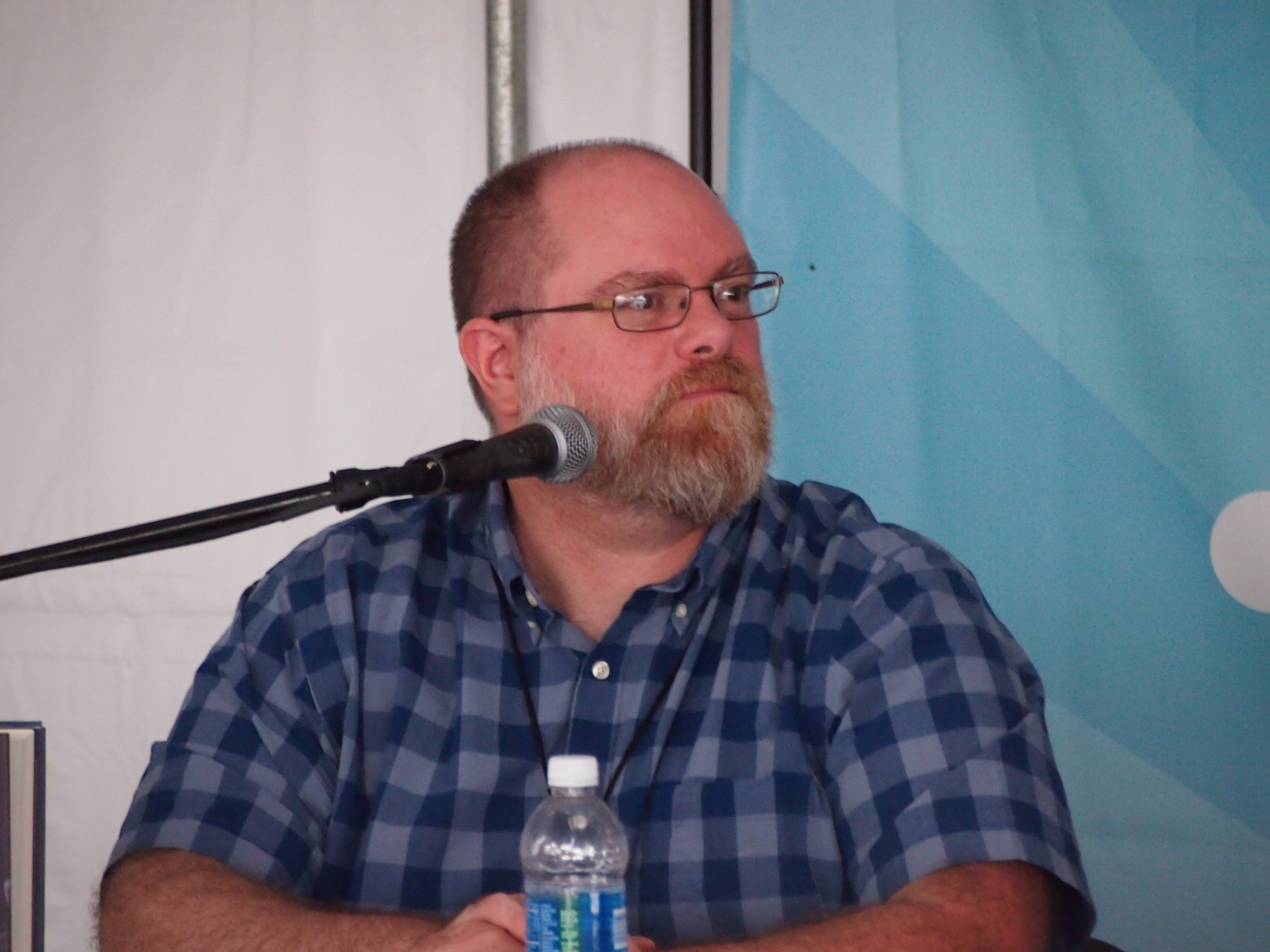
- Education: University of Illinois, Urbana-Champaign
- Writing career
- Notable awards: National Endowment for the Arts fellowship Bakeless Prize
- Website: www.tedsanders.net

Ted Sanders (born 1969) is an American writer. He is the author of the short story collection No Animals We Could Name (Graywolf Press), which won the 2011 Bakeless Prize. He is also the author of The Keepers, a fantasy series for middle-grade readers published by HarperCollins which underperformed. The first book of the series, The Box and the Dragonfly, was published in March 2015. The Harp and the Ravenvine was released in March 2016, and The Portal and the Veil was published in September 2017. The fourth and final book of the series, The Starlit Loom, was published in November 2018.

== Life ==
In 2012, Sanders received a Literature Fellowship from the National Endowment for the Arts. His short story "Obit" was included in the 2010 O. Henry Prize Stories anthology. His short stories and essays have appeared in the Georgia Review, Gettysburg Review, Cincinnati Review, Southern Review, and elsewhere.

A native of northern Illinois, Sanders is an assistant professor of English at the University of Illinois, Urbana-Champaign, where he teaches creative writing.
