= Benita Sanders =

Canadian artist (born 1935)

- Born: Benita Elizabeth Sanders; April 6, 1935 (age 90); Betchworth, Surrey, England
- Education: École des Beaux-Arts des Beaux Arts, Paris; Chelsea College of Art, London; the Accademia di Belle Arti di Firenze; Atelier 17 with Stanley William Hayter (1960-1963); Blackburn’s Printmaking Workshop, NY (1963–1973)

Benita Sanders (born April 6, 1935) is a Canadian printmaker, painter and pastelist.

== Career ==
Sanders was born in Betchworth, Surrey. Her mother emigrated to Canada with her in 1940. She studied at the École des Beaux-Arts des Beaux Arts, Paris; the Chelsea Art School, London (1956–1958); the Accademia di Belle Arti di Firenze (1958–1960); Atelier 17, Paris with Stanley William Hayter (1960–1963); and at Blackburn’s Printmaking Workshop, New York (1963–1973).

After a first visit and solo kayak trip to the Queen Charlotte islands, now Haida Gwaii, in the 1960s, she lived there for 40 years. She participated in a solo show at the Montreal Museum of Fine Arts (1964) and the National Gallery of Canada juried group show Canadian Water Colours, Drawings and Prints (1966) and then had a number of solo shows at commercial galleries in Ottawa (Robertson Galleries, 1964 and 1972), Toronto (Gallery Pascal, 1968) and Vancouver (Equinox Gallery, 1973 and 1985). She had a show of 60 years of work at the Haida Gwaii Museum in 2019.

Her work is included in the collections of the National Gallery of Canada, the Metropolitan Museum of Art and the Museum of Modern Art, New York. She is represented by Duthie Gallery, Salt Spring Island, British Columbia.
