= Ewoud Sanders =

Dutch language historian and journalist

Ewoud Sanders (born 24 March 1958 in The Hague) is a Dutch journalist and historian of the Dutch language. In his column WoordHoek, which appeared in NRC Handelsblad from 2000 to 2020, subsequently on the website of the Institute for the Dutch Language, and now in the fortnightly newspaper ARGUS, he writes about the history of words and expressions. Sanders has written numerous books on language and also publishes on the digitisation of, and digital access to, newspapers, books and periodicals. Sanders's books on language generally deal with the history of words and expressions. His research draws on a large digital collection of source material, part of which he has assembled and maintains himself. He regularly gives lectures on creating, organising and providing access to such collections. In 2009, this was the subject of the eighteenth Bert van Selm Lecture, entitled De reïncarnatie van het boek. In zeven stappen een eigen digitale bibliotheek, published by Stichting Neerlandistiek Leiden. In 2011, Sanders published Eerste Hulp Bij e-Onderzoek, a guide to more effective online searching and the systematic organisation of research material. Later editions appeared under the title Slimmer zoeken op internet. The guide has been distributed free of charge to students at several universities and universities of applied sciences. In December 2011, Sanders received a US$15,000 donation from Google to promote more effective internet searching in the Netherlands. On 3 March 2017, Sanders received his doctorate from Radboud University in Nijmegen for a dissertation entitled Levi's eerste kerstfeest: Jeugdverhalen over jodenbekering, 1792–2015. The study analyses representations of Jews in eighty Christian stories for young readers — sixty-seven Protestant and thirteen Roman Catholic — in which Jewish characters convert to Christianity. In 2021, Sanders was awarded the Groenman-taalprijs for his work as a language columnist. In 2023, he received the Taalboekenprijs for Het n-woord. De geschiedenis van een beladen begrip.

== Selected publications ==
=== Book history and Jewish history ===
• ‘Jood’, de vergeten geschiedenis van een beladen woord (WalburgPers, 2024) • Van appeljood tot zuurjood. Veertig portretten van joodse straatventers (WalburgPers, 2024) • Met de paplepel. Beeldvorming over joden in Nederlandstalige jeugdverhalen, 1782–heden (WalburgPers, 2022) • Boeken op het Binnenhof (Aspekt, 2022) • Lachen om Levie. Komisch bedoeld antisemitisme, 1830–1930 (Walburg Pers, 2020) • Foute boeken! (The Hague: Stichting Vrienden Museum Meermanno, 2020) • Joden in Nederlandse jeugdverhalen (Voorburg: Stichting Geschiedenis Kinder- en Jeugdliteratuur, 2017) • ‘Als dank voor de gelukkigste momenten in mijn bestaan’: een feestmaal voor arme straatboekhandelaars, Parijs 1892 (Amsterdam: De Kan, 2017; Tilburg: Stichting Desiderata, 2021) • Levi's eerste kerstfeest. Jeugdverhalen over jodenbekering, 1792–2015 (doctoral dissertation; Nijmegen: Vantilt, 2017) • De handel en wandel van de boekenjood. Over vermaarde, vergeten en fictieve straatboekhandelaren (Heemstede, 2014) • with Nop Maas, Goed gelezen. 10 jaar Nationale Voorleesdag (Amsterdam: Stichting Lezen, 2003)

=== Informal language ===
• Van Dale Modern Bargoens woordenboek (Utrecht: Uitgeverij Van Dale, 2009) • Henry Roskam, Boeven-jargon, introduced by Ewoud Sanders and Nicoline van der Sijs (Amsterdam: L.J. Veen, 2002) • Gabbertaal & Boeventaal. Twee Bargoense woordenboekjes uit de eerste helft van de twintigste eeuw (Amsterdam: De Bijenkorf, 1999) • with Rob Tempelaars, Krijg de vinkentering! 1001 hedendaagse Vlaamse en Nederlandse verwensingen (Amsterdam: Contact, 1998)

=== History of words and expressions ===
• Het n-woord. De geschiedenis van een beladen begrip (Amsterdam: Prometheus, 2023) • Helder mij even op. De beste WoordHoeken uit NRC (Zutphen, 2020) • Pruimen op sap. Beknopt erotisch ABC (Amsterdam: Xander, 2017) • Aarsrivalen, scheldkarbonades en terminale baden (Amsterdam: Prometheus; first edition 2005, second edition 2007, third edition 2009) • Allemaal woorden (Amsterdam: Prometheus, 2005) • Woorden met een verhaal (Amsterdam: Prometheus, 2004) • Van Nergenshuizen tot Absurdistan. Verzonnen plaatsnamen in het Nederlands (Amsterdam: Prometheus, 2003) • Voor een dubbeltje op de eerste rang. 1001 spreekwoorden en zegswijzen over Nederlands geld (Amsterdam: Prometheus, 2001) • Jemig de pemig! De invloed van Van Kooten en De Bie op het Nederlands (Amsterdam: Contact, 1999) • Tararaboemdiee & de Blikken Dominee. De geschiedenis van ons nationale straatlied (Amsterdam: De Buitenkant, 1997) • Borrelwoordenboek. 750 volksnamen voor onze glazen boterham (The Hague: Sdu, 1997) • Fiets! De geschiedenis van een vulgair jongenswoord (The Hague: Sdu, 1996) • Geoniemenwoordenboek. Woorden die zijn afgeleid van plaatsnamen (Amsterdam: Nijgh & Van Ditmar, 1995) • Eponiemenwoordenboek. Woorden die teruggaan op historische personen (Amsterdam: Nijgh & Van Ditmar, 1993)

=== New words ===
• Van asotaks tot zedenpleger. Tien jaar nieuwe woorden (Rotterdam: NRC Boeken, 2009) • De taal van het jaar. De nieuwe woorden en uitdrukkingen van 2003 (Amsterdam/Rotterdam: Prometheus, 2004) • De taal van het jaar: de nieuwe woorden en uitdrukkingen van 2002 (Amsterdam/Rotterdam: Prometheus/NRC Handelsblad, 2003) • De taal van het jaar: nieuwe woorden en uitdrukkingen, editie 2001 (Amsterdam/Antwerp: L.J. Veen, 2001) • De taal van het jaar. Tweehonderdvijftig woorden die het aanzien van 2001 bepaalden (Amsterdam/Antwerp: Uitgeverij L.J. Veen, 2000) • De taal van het jaar: nieuwe woorden en uitdrukkingen, editie 2000 (Amsterdam/Antwerp: Contact, 2000)

=== Historical dictionaries ===
• ‘Ik zit hier midden in de geleerdheid’. Brieven van Antonie Cornelis Oudemans aan Arie de Jager 1847–1874, introduced and annotated by Ewoud Sanders (Deventer, 1998) • with Nop Maas, Vrouw, zie ook Hemel en Hel. Humoristisch-satirische woordenboeken in Nederland in de 18de en 19de eeuw (Utrecht: Uitgeverij Van Dale Lexicografie, 1994) • Woorden van de duivel. Een bloemlezing uit het enige verboden Nederlandse woordenboek (Amsterdam: De Bijenkorf, 1993) • De W lijkt ons niet zo'n heksentoer. De geschiedenis van de Prisma Woordenboeken 1952–1993 (Utrecht: Het Spectrum, 1993)

=== Language usage ===
• Taaltumult. De mooiste observaties, hartenkreten & boze brieven uit zeventig jaargangen Onze Taal (Amsterdam: Athenaeum – Polak & Van Gennep, 2002) • with Koos Metselaar, Stijlboek NRC Handelsblad (Utrecht: Van Dale, 2000)

=== Mass digitisation and online searching ===
• Slimmer zoeken naar joodse bronnen in Delpher (Haarlem, 2024) • Digitaal gouddelven bij de KB (Koninklijke Bibliotheek) (The Hague: Koninklijke Bibliotheek, 2015) • Digitaal schatgraven bij de KB (Koninklijke Bibliotheek) (The Hague: Koninklijke Bibliotheek, 2014) • Van Analoog naar Digitaal. Digitaliserings Best Practice nader belicht (Roermond: X-Cago, 2014) • Eerste Hulp bij e-Onderzoek (Leiden/The Hague: Early Dutch Books Online, 2011) • De boekloze bibliotheek (Woubrugge: Avalon, 2005)

=== Museum catalogues ===
• editor, Topstukken uit de collectie van het Privaat Leesmuseum (Amsterdam: Antiquariaat Digitalis, 2018) • Topstukken uit de collecties van het Joods Cultureel Kwartier (Amsterdam: WalburgPers, 2017) • Boekengeluk. Vijftig hoogtepunten uit het Museum Meermanno (Amsterdam/The Hague: Museum Meermanno/De Buitenkant, 2008)
