= Tommy Sanders =

American writer and sportscaster

Tommy Sanders (born April 20, 1954) is an American sportscaster and host of ESPN Outdoors, the ESPN network's four-hour block of outdoors programming that airs nationally every Saturday morning.

== Biography ==
Sanders debuted on ESPN when ESPN Outdoors was launched in January 1990. He introduces each program and the short features which are aired between the shows. These features often have an environmental and/or educational theme. He serves in a similar role on ESPN2’s Sunday morning outdoors programming block.

Sanders also hosts the Stihl Timbersports Series (since 1990), the FLW Tournament series (since 1996) and the Bassmaster Classic fishing tournament series, all airing on the ESPN family of TV networks. In addition, he co-hosts Saltwater TV, a weekly webcast at ESPNOutdoors.com. Other programs featuring Sanders include The Bassmasters (co-hosted with Mark Zona, airing weekly on ESPN2) and Hooked Up (a webcast seen at bassmasters.com.)

A native of Magnolia, Arkansas, Sanders graduated in 1976 from Hendrix College in Conway, Arkansas, earning a bachelor of arts degree in English and theater. While at Hendrix he helped launch the campus radio station, KHDX, in 1973. He attended graduate school at New York University from 1980 to 1981, studying film and television.

Sanders began his career in television as a writer and producer for Arkansas Educational Television from 1979–1980, and worked for seven years (1980–1987) as a freelance writer and on-air host of industrial and educational films. From 1987-1992, Sanders was a partner in The Works, a recording studio in Little Rock, Arkansas.

Sanders' future status with ESPN remains unclear following the network's 3 August 2010 announcement that it plans to sell B.A.S.S. LLC, which runs the Bassmasters Fishing series, to a group of investors led by Don Logan, Jerry McKinnis and Jim Copeland. McKinnis is also a sportscaster and a colleague of Sanders who hosted The Fishin' Hole on ESPN from 1980 to 2007.

== Awards and honors ==
Sanders was inducted into the Arkansas Outdoor Hall of Fame on 11 September 2009.

ESPN2's 2008 and 2009 Bassmaster Classic television coverage, co-hosted by Sanders and Zona, was nominated for Sports Emmy Awards in both 2009 and 2010 for the Outstanding Live Event Turnaround category.

== Personal life ==
Sanders, who is married, lives in Little Rock, Arkansas. He was a recipient of an Outstanding Volunteer Award presented by the Arkansas Public Broadcasting Service in 1988. He also has served on the board of directors in the Quapaw Council of the Boy Scouts of America since 1991 and is active with United Cerebral Palsy.

== See also ==
- List of ESPN personalities
- Tommy Sanders archive at ESPN.com
