= Furness Railway K2 Class =

Class of eight British 4-4-0 locomotives

Furness Railway K2 class
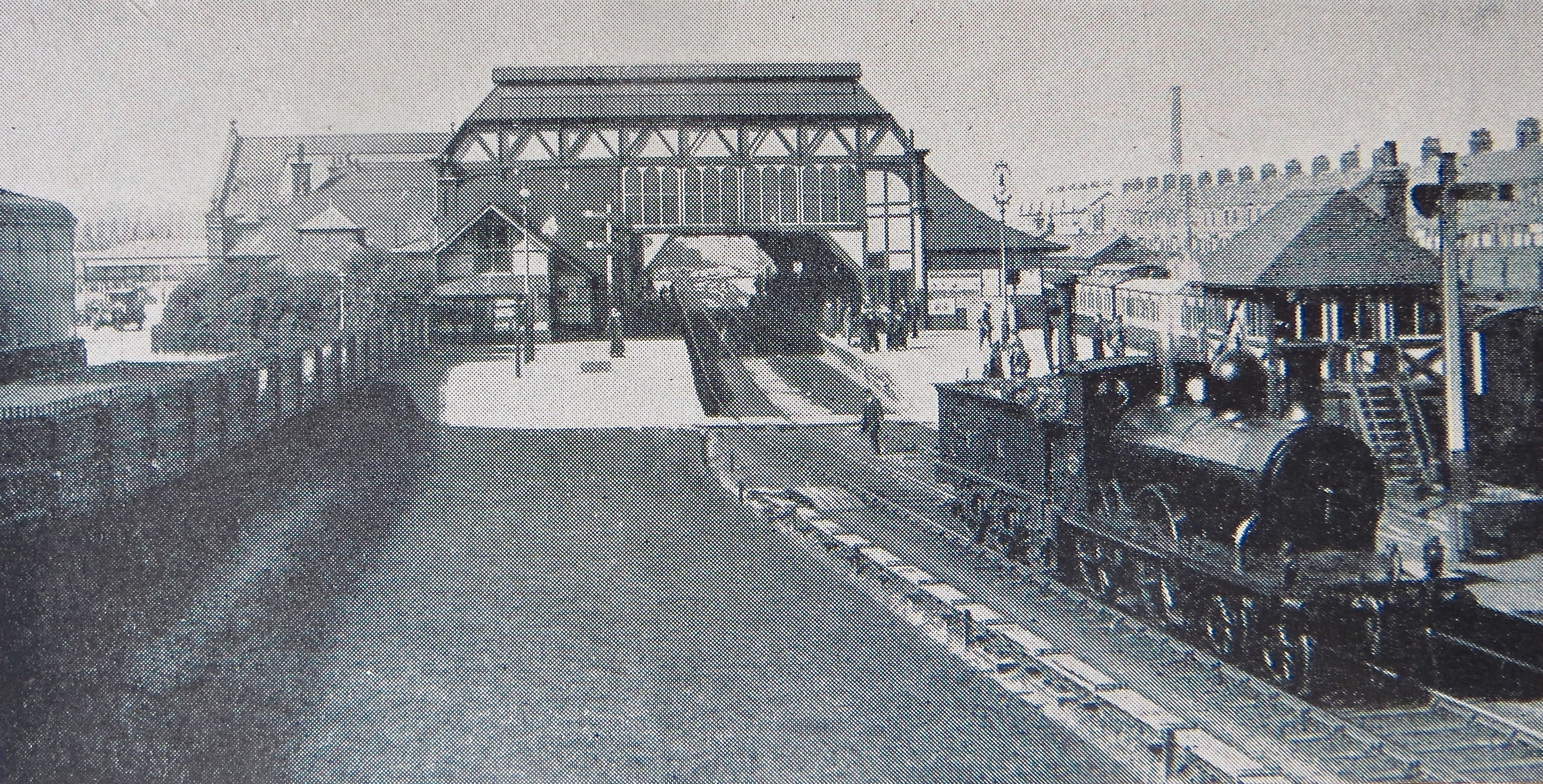
- FR K2 No. 34 at Barrow-in-Furness in 1915.
Type and origin
- Power type: Steam
- Designer: W. F. Pettigrew
- Builder: Sharp, Stewart and Company
- Serial number: 4174–4179, 4651–4652
- Build date: 1896 (6), 1900 (2)
- Total produced: 8
Specifications
- Configuration
  - Whyte: 4-4-0
  - UIC: 2′B
- Gauge: 4 ft 8 1/2 in (1,435 mm) standard gauge
- Leading dia.: 3 ft (0.914 m)
- Driver dia.: 6 ft (1.829 m)
- Length: 48 ft 6 in (14.78 m)
- Loco weight: 41 long tons 6 cwt or 42.0 t or 46.3 short tons
- Tender weight: 28 long tons 5 cwt or 28.7 t or 31.6 short tons
- Fuel type: Coal
- Fuel capacity: 3 long tons 10 cwt or 3.6 t or 3.9 short tons
- Water cap.: 2,500 imp gal (11,000 L; 3,000 US gal)
- Firebox
  - Type: Round-top
- Boiler pressure: 150 lbf/in^{2} (1.03 MPa)
- Cylinders: Two, inside
- Cylinder size: 18 in × 24 in (457 mm × 610 mm)
- Valve gear: Stephenson
Performance figures
- Tractive effort: 13,770 lbf (61.3 kN)
Career
- Operators: FR » LMS
- Class: FR: 21 class ("K2")
- Power class: LMS: 1P
- Numbers: FR: 21–22, 34–35 (renumbered 44–47) 36–37, 124–125; LMS: 10135–10142
- Nicknames: Larger Seagulls
- Withdrawn: 1929–1931
- Disposition: All scrapped

The Furness Railway 21 class (classified "K2" by Bob Rush) or "Larger Seagulls", were a class of eight English 4-4-0 steam locomotives designed by W. F. Pettigrew and built by Sharp, Stewart and Company of Glasgow for the Furness Railway. Six were built in 1896, and two more in 1900. They were built to supersede the 120 class on the heavier and more important trains and were in turn replaced on the railway’s top trains with the 115 class in the 1920s. They had 6-foot-0-inch (1.829 m) diameter driving wheels with 18-by-24-inch (457 mm × 610 mm) cylinders.

== Numbering ==
The first six of 1896 were numbered 21, 22, 34, 35, 36 and 37 by the Furness Railway (works numbers were 4174–4179). In 1900, two extra engines were added to the class, Furness Railway numbers 124–125 (works numbers 4651–4652). In 1913, two engines, FR Nos. 34 and 37, were fitted with experimental Phoenix smokebox superheaters, however, these were removed the following year. At some point in time locomotives 21, 22, 34 and 35 were renumbered 44–47 respectively.

By 1923 and the grouping of the FR into the London, Midland and Scottish Railway, all eight engines were still in service, and received LMS numbers, these being 10135–10142 (in order of their later numbers). They lasted until the late 1920s and early 1930s, performing secondary duties on former FR lines between Barrow-in-Furness and Whitehaven.

== Tenders ==
The six-wheeled tenders that this class used were also used by the Furness Railway D3 0-6-0 tender engines. They carried 2,500 imperial gallons (11,000 L; 3,000 US gal) of water and 3.5 long tons (3.6 tonnes) of coal, their weight being 28.25 long tons (28.70 tonnes).

== Withdrawal ==
The class was withdrawn and scrapped from 1929 to 1931.

Table of withdrawals
Year	Quantity in service at start of year	Quantity withdrawn	Locomotive numbers	Notes
1929	8	6	10135/38-42	
1930	2	1	10137	
1931	1	1	10136	

== Edward the Blue Engine ==
Edward the Blue Engine, from the Railway Series books and its television series adaptation Thomas the Tank Engine & Friends, is described as bearing "a quite striking similarity" to the Furness "Larger Seagulls". The 4-4-0 type is a fairly common design pattern in British steam locomotives. However, Edward differs in having a cab with dual glazed side windows, a much more characteristic feature of North Eastern railway locomotives. The tapered non-circular spectacle plate windows and the higher boiler line are distinctively those of the NER Class R1.

== See also ==
- Locomotives of the Furness Railway
