= Locomotives of the Furness Railway =

British locomotives

The Furness Railway Company owned many different types of locomotives, built by several locomotive building companies, including Sharp, Stewart and Company. Others were built by the Furness' constituent companies – the Whitehaven and Furness Junction Railway, among others.

== Furness Railway locomotives ==
The classes listed below are not the official FR designations; they were made popular by author Bob Rush in his books about the Furness Railway.

FR class	Rush class	Whyte type	Quantity made	Manufacturer Serial numbers	Years built	FR number(s)	LMS number(s)	Year(s) withdrawn	Comments
1	A1	0-4-0	2	Bury, Curtis & Kennedy	1844	1–2	—	1870	
3	A2	0-4-0	2	Bury, Curtis & Kennedy	1846	3–4	—	1898	No. 3, "Old Coppernob" preserved
7	A3	0-4-0	4	Wm Fairbairn & Co.	1854–55	7–10	—	1899–1900	
7	A4	0-4-0	4	Wm Fairbairn & Co.	1858–61	13–16	—	1899	
17	A5	0-4-0	8	Sharp, Stewart & Co. 1434, 1435, 1447, 1448, 1585, 1586, 1662, 1663	1863–66	17–20, 25–28	—	1870–1918	Some rebuilt as 0-4-0ST. No. 20 preserved as 0-4-0, No. 25 preserved as 0-4-0ST
5	B1	2-2-2WT	2	Sharp, Stewart & Co. 696–697	1851	5–6	—	1873	
	B2	2-2-2WT	2	Sharp, Stewart & Co. 1016, 1019	1857	11–12	—	1873–98	
21	B3	2-2-2WT	6	Sharp, Stewart & Co.	1864–66	21–22, 34–37	—	1896–99	
	B4	2-2-2WT	1		1860		—		
	B5	2-2-2WT	2		1850		—		
23	C1	0-4-0ST	4	Sharp, Stewart & Co. 2448–2450	1874	94–97	11258	1914–24	
23	C2	0-4-0ST	2	Sharp, Stewart & Co. 1543–1544	1862	23–24	—	1904	
29	D1	0-6-0	55	Sharp, Stewart & Co.	1866–84				Nicknamed "Sharpies"
	D2	0-6-0	2		1864				
7	D3	0-6-0	6	Nasmyth, Wilson & Co. 552–557	1899	7–12	12468–12473	1928–32	
7	D3	0-6-0	6	Sharp, Stewart & Co. 4563–4568	1899	13–18	12474–12479	1929–36	
3	D4	0-6-0	4	North British Loco. 17840–17843	1907	3–6	12480–12483	1930–34	
1	D5	0-6-0	4	North British Loco. 20073–20076	1913–14	1–2, 25–26	12494–12497	1932–56	
1	D5	0-6-0	2	North British Loco. 20865–20866	1914	27–28	12498–12499	1932–57	
1	D5	0-6-0	4	North British Loco. 21993–21196	1918	23–24, 29–30	12504–12507	1930–35	
1	D5	0-6-0	4	Kitson & Co. 5195–5198	1919	19–22	12500–12503	1930–57	
1	D5	0-6-0	5	North British Loco. 22572–22576	1920	31–35	12508–12512	1932–57	
1	E1	2-4-0	19	Sharp, Stewart & Co.	1870–82		10002	1907–24	Seven rebuilt as 2-4-2T
	F1	0-4-2	2		1866		—		
51	G1	0-6-0T	6	Sharp Stewart & Co.	1867–73	51–52, 68–69, 82–83	11549–11552		Nicknamed "Neddies"
	G2	0-6-0ST	13		1855–73				
	G3	0-6-0ST	1		1875				
	G4	0-6-0T	1		1857				
19	G5	0-6-0T	6	Vulcan Foundry 2523–2528	1910	19–24	11553–11558	1930–43	Renumbered 55–60
19	G5	0-6-0T	2	Kitson & Co. 5121–5122	1915	51–52	11559–11560	1930–34	
19	G5	0-6-0T	2	Vulcan Foundry 3174–3175	1916	53–54	11561–11562	1931–36	
	H1	2-4-0T	1		1850		—		
	J1	2-4-2T	7		1891	47–48, 70–74	10619–10620	1914–24	Rebuilt from 2-4-0s
120	K1	4-4-0	4	Sharp, Stewart & Co. 3618–3621	1891	120–123	10131–10134	1924–27	Nicknamed "Seagulls"
21	K2	4-4-0	6	Sharp, Stewart & Co. 4174–4179	1896	21–22, 34–37	10135–10140	1929–31	Nicknamed "Larger Seagulls"
21	K2	4-4-0	2	Sharp, Stewart& Co. 4651–4652	1900	124–125	10141–10142	1929–31	Nicknamed "Larger Seagulls"
126	K3	4-4-0	4	Sharp, Stewart & Co. 4716–4719	1901	126–129	10143–10146	1930–31	
130	K4	4-4-0	2	North British Loco. 20071–20072	1913	130–131	10185–10186	1932–33	
130	K4	4-4-0	2	North British Loco. 20867–20868	1914	132–133	10187–10188	1932–33	
112	L1	0-6-2T	3	Sharp, Stewart & Co. 4364–4366	1898	112–114	11622–11624	1927–28	
98	L2	0-6-2T	5	Nasmyth, Wilson & Co. 689–693	1904	98–102	11625–11629	1930–45	Nicknamed "Cleator Tanks"
98	L2	0-6-2T	5	North British Loco. 16113–16117	1904	103–107	11630–11634	1929–34	Nicknamed "Cleator Tanks"
98	L3	0-6-2T	6	North British Loco. 17808–17813	1907	96–97, 108–111	11635–11640	1931–41	
94	L4	0-6-2T	2	Kitson & Co. 4855–4856	1912	94–95	11641–11642	1929–34	Nicknamed "Improved Cleator Tanks"
94	L4	0-6-2T	2	Kitson & Co. 5042–5043	1914	92–93	11643–11644	1932–34	Nicknamed "Improved Cleator Tanks"
38	M1	4-4-2T	2	Kitson & Co. 5119–5120	1915	38–39	11080–11081	1930–32	
38	M1	4-4-2T	2	Vulcan Foundry 3176–3177	1916	40–41	11082–11083	1930–32	
38	M1	4-4-2T	2	Kitson & Co. 5172–5173	1915	42–43	11084–11085	1930–31	
115	N1	4-6-4T	5	Kitson & Co. 5292–5296	1920–21	115–119	11100–11104	1934–40	Photograph
—	—	0-4-0T Railmotor	2	FR, Barrow	1905	1–2	—	?–1914	

== Cleator and Workington Junction Railway ==
The FR entered into a working agreement with the Cleator and Workington Junction Railway (C&WJR), where it would work the company's mainlines while the branch lines were worked by native engines. The loco list previously shown on this page has been amended thus:

=== C&WJR locomotives ===
All the nameplates used on this company's locomotives were named after residences of C&WJR company directors. Until recently there was uncertainty about the name of No. 2 but the personal notebook of the Company Accountant shows otherwise. The engine never ran in service with the name Ennerdale.

- No. 1 Brigham Hill (1st) and Rothersyke (1st)

An outside cylinder 0-4-0T Built in 1894 by Fletcher Jennings Ltd for C&WJR. Builders No. 187.
Nameplates carried: Brigham Hill (1882–1894) and Rothersyke (1894–1897)
Renumbered: No known renumbering of this engine.
Disposal: To West Stanley Colliery Coy. County Durham in 1897

- No. 2 Unnamed for fifteen years, then Rothersyke (2nd)

An outside cylinder 0-4-0ST. Built circa 1875 by Barclay & Co. (not an Andrew Barclay Sons & Co. product). Built originally for Ward, Ross & Liddlelow, railway contractors to the C&WJR, No. 2 was purchased second hand in 1882. No. 2 was originally named Ennerdale but the nameplates were removed after acquisition by the C&WJR on the order of the Managing Director.
Nameplates Carried: None from 1882 to 1897. The redundant plates from engine No.1 Rothersyke were fitted when it was decided to sell the engine.
Renumbered: No known renumbering of this engine.
Disposal: To SD Coasdell of Workington in July 1898 for £150.

- No. 3 South Lodge

An outside cylinder 0-6-0ST of 1884, built by Robert Stephenson and Company for the C&WJR. Builders No. 2553. The saddle tank did not cover the smokebox.
Nameplates carried: South Lodge. (1884 to 1920)
Renumbered: No known renumbering of this engine.
Disposal: To J.F. Wake Ltd., Dealers, Darlington, County Durham, July 1920

- No. 4 Harecroft

An outside cylinder 0-6-0ST built in 1885 by the Lowca Engineering Co. Ltd. for the C&WJR. Builders No. 196. Similar in appearance to No. 3 and the saddle tank did not cover the smokebox.
Nameplates carried: Harecroft (1885 to 1915)
Renumbered: After disposal by new owner to 46
Disposal: Withdrawn September 1915 and sold to Workington Iron & Steel Company.

- No. 5 Moresby Hall

An outside cylinder 0-6-0ST built in 1890 by Robert Stephenson and Company for the C&WJR. Builders No. 2692. The saddle tank did not cover the smokebox.
Nameplates carried: Moresby Hall (1890 to 1919)
Renumbered: No known renumbering of this engine.
Disposal: Withdrawn and scrapped 1919.

- No. 6 Brigham Hall

An outside cylinder 0-6-0ST built in 1894 by Robert Stephenson and Company for the C&WJR. Builders No. 2813. The saddle tank did not cover the smokebox.
Nameplates carried: Brigham Hall (1894 to 1920)
Renumbered: Allocated 11564 by the LMS in 1923 after the grouping, but not known if it was repainted into LMS colours.
Disposal: Withdrawn 11 December 1926 and scrapped by the LM&SR

- No. 7 Ponsonby Hall

An outside cylinder 0-6-0ST built in 1896 by Robert Stephenson and Company for the C&WJR. Builders No. 2846. The saddle tank did not cover the smokebox.
Nameplates carried: Ponsonby Hall (1886 to 1926)
Renumbered: Allocated 11565 by the LMS in 1923 after the grouping, but not known if it was repainted into LMS colours.
Disposal: Withdrawn 18 December 1926 and scrapped by the LM&SR

- No. 8 Hutton Hall

An 0-6-0ST built in 1907 by Peckett and Sons for the C&WJR. Builders No. 1134.
Nameplates carried: Hutton Hall (1907 to 1927)
Renumbered: Allocated 11566 by the LMS in 1923 after the grouping, and repainted into early LMS black goods livery.
Disposal: Withdrawn 3 December 1927 and scrapped by the LM&SR

- No. 9 Millgrove

An outside cylinder 0-6-0ST built in 1919 by Peckett and Sons for the C&WJR. Builders No. 1340.
Nameplates carried: Millgrove (1919 to 1928)
Renumbered: Allocated 11567 by the LMS in 1923 after the grouping, and repainted into early LMS black goods livery.
Disposal: Withdrawn 5 December 1928 and scrapped by the LM&SR

- No. 10 Skiddaw Lodge

An outside cylinder 0-6-0ST built in 1920 by Hudswell Clarke & Co. for the C&WJR. Builders No. 1400.
Nameplates carried: Skiddaw Lodge (1920 to 1932)
Renumbered: Allocated 11568 by the LMS in 1923 after the grouping, and repainted into early LMS black goods livery.
Disposal: Withdrawn 1932 by LM&SR and sold to Hartley main Collieries Northumberland, via Robert frazer & Sons Ltd., Hebburn, County Durham.

== Preserved locomotives ==
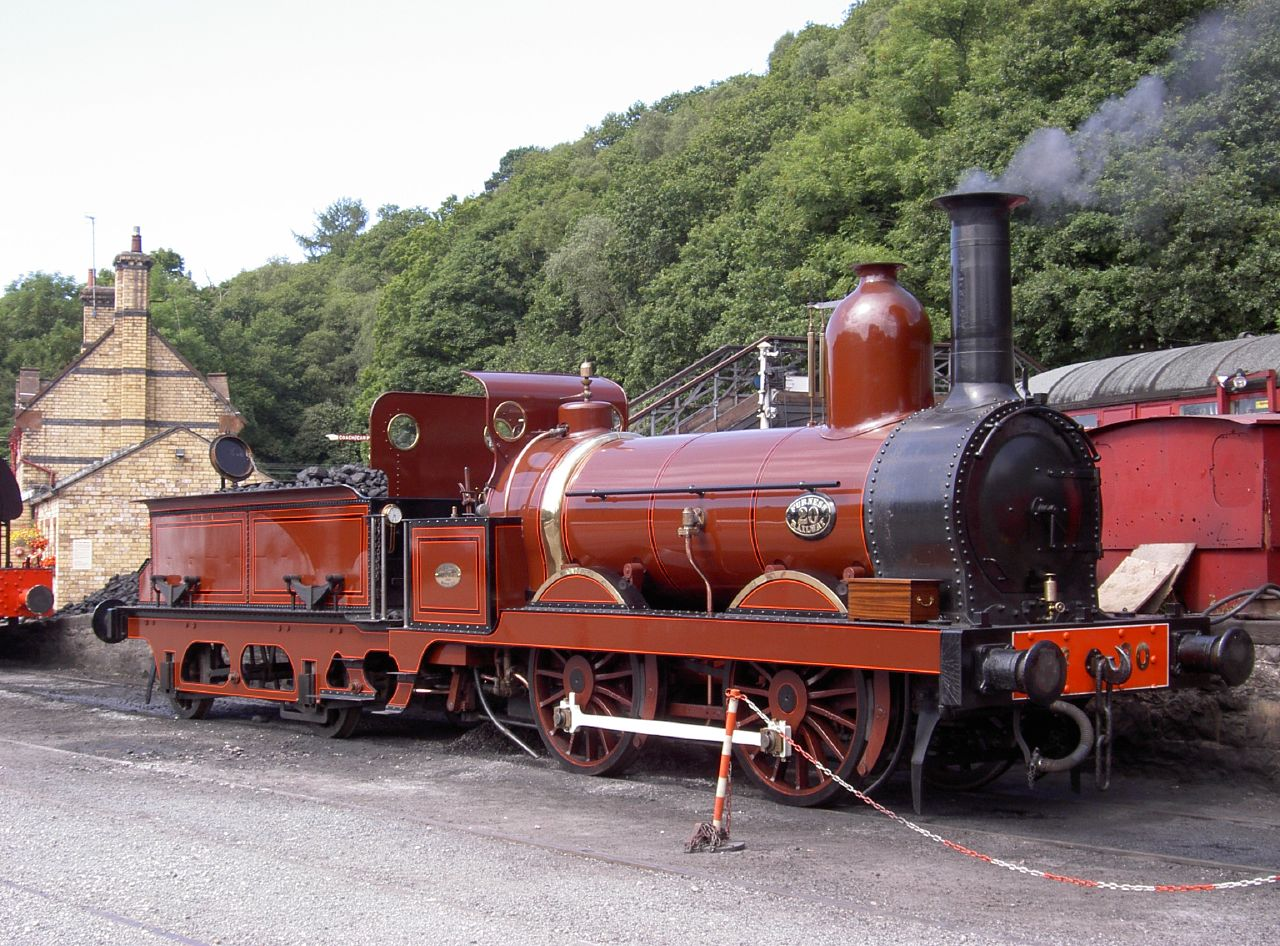
Furness Railway No. 20

Three very early Furness Railway locomotives have been preserved:

- Furness Railway No. 3 – "Old Coppernob" 0-4-0 tender engine of 1846, preserved at the National Railway Museum in York.
- Furness Railway No. 20 – Sharp Stewart Class A5 0-4-0 tender engine of 1863, now at Ribble Steam Railway in Lancashire. This is Britain's oldest working standard-gauge steam locomotive. It had been converted to a saddle-tank locomotive, but has now been restored to its original tender locomotive design.
- Furness Railway No. 25 – Sharp Stewart Class A5 0-4-0 tender engine of 1865, now at Ribble Steam Railway awaiting restoration. Unlike No. 20 (above), this locomotive remains in its later saddle-tank format.
- Furness Railway No. 115 – Sharp Stewart Class D1 0-6-0 tender locomotive of 1881. The locomotive was lost when a mine working collapsed at Lindal-in-Furness on 22 September 1892; only the tender was rescued, which was then used on a loco to replace 115. The locomotive remains buried 200 ft underground, but is technically still in existence.
