= Furness Railway No. 3 =

Preserved British steam locomotive

Furness Railway No.3 "Old Coppernob"
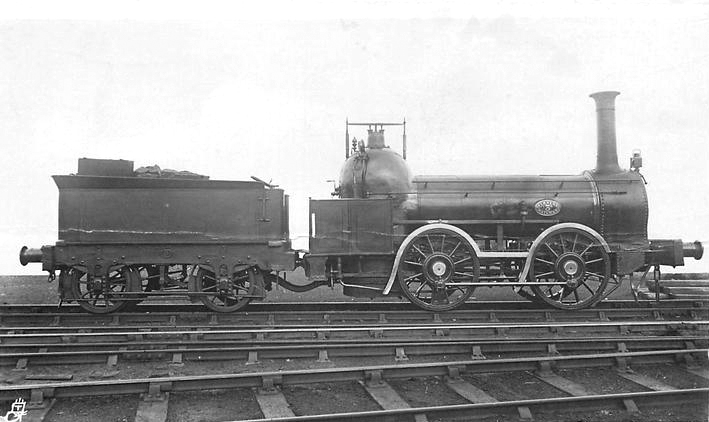
- No. 3 Old Coppernob, Furness Railway (1846–1899)
Type and origin
- Power type: Steam
- Builder: Edward Bury
- Build date: 1846
Specifications
- Configuration
  - Whyte: 0-4-0
  - UIC: B
- Gauge: 4 ft 8 1/2 in (1,435 mm) standard gauge
- Driver dia.: 4 ft 9 in (1.448 m)
- Loco weight: 19 long tons 10 cwt (43,700 lb or 19.8 t)
- Boiler pressure: 110 psi (0.76 MPa)
- Cylinders: Two, inside
- Cylinder size: 14 in × 24 in (356 mm × 610 mm)
Performance figures
- Tractive effort: 7,718 lbf (34.3 kN)
Career
- Operators: Furness Railway
- Locale: Great Britain
- First run: February 1846
- Withdrawn: 1900
- Disposition: Housed as a static exhibit at Barrow 1900-1940s, now preserved.

The Furness Railway No.3, nicknamed "Old Coppernob", is a preserved English steam locomotive. It acquired its nickname because of the copper cladding to its dome-shaped "haystack" firebox.

== History ==
It was built in 1846 by Bury, Curtis, and Kennedy of Liverpool, a company with which the Furness Railway's first locomotive superintendent James Ramsden had been an apprentice. It is an 0-4-0 version of Edward Bury's popular bar-frame design of the period, with iron bar frames and inside cylinders, and is historically significant as the only survivor of this type in the United Kingdom. It is also one of the few preserved engines from the Furness Railway, whose Indian red livery it carries.

== Withdrawal ==
It handled all traffic on the Furness Railway with three similar engines for around six years. Later it was used for shunting around the docks at Barrow-in-Furness and on local duties, being withdrawn in 1900 after nearly 55 years of service.

== Preservation ==
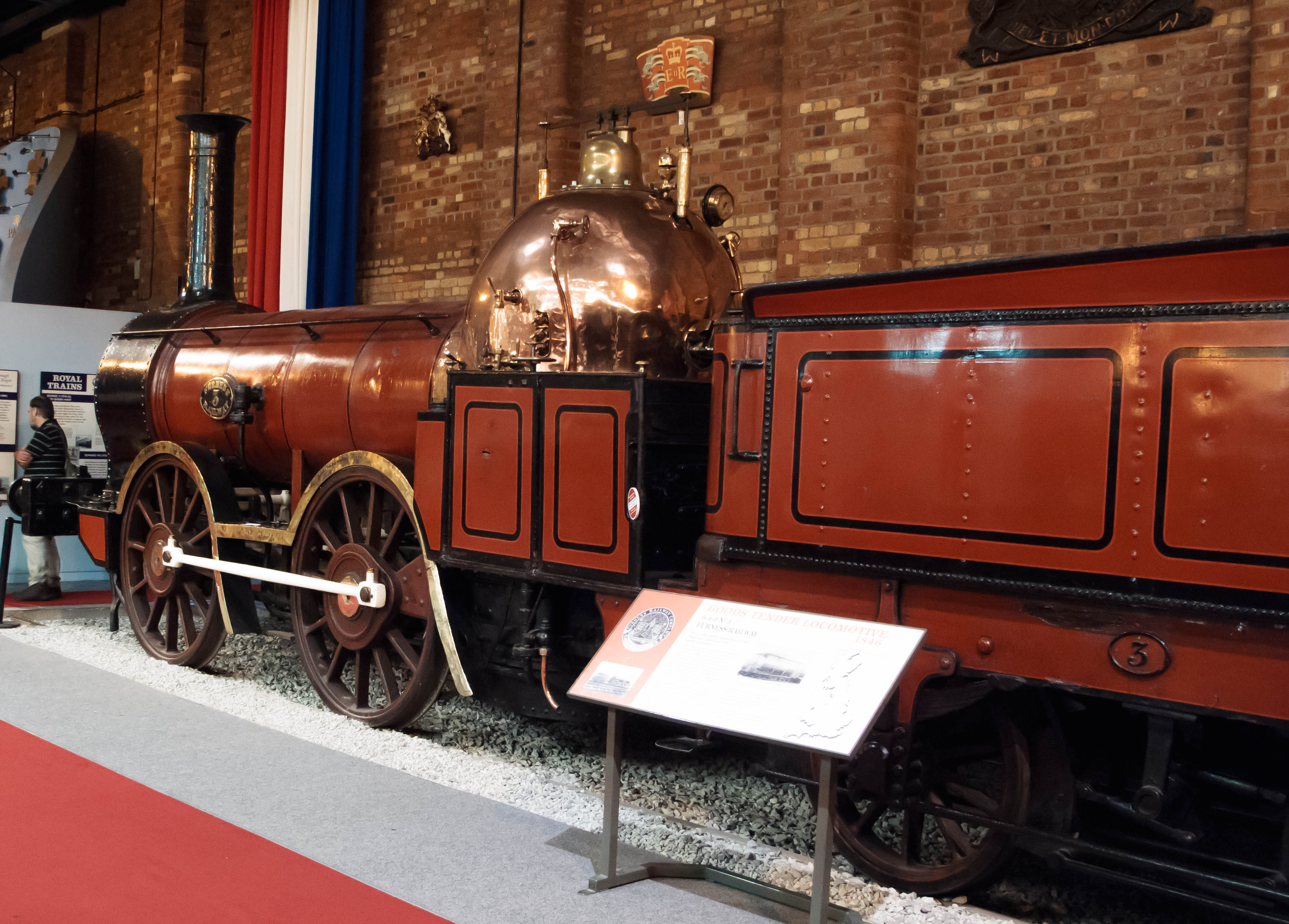
The locomotive displayed at York

It is now housed in the National Railway Museum, York. It has shrapnel damage from German bombs, received during World War II when it was displayed in a glass pavilion at Barrow-in-Furness station.

In February 2007, No. 3 had one of its shedplates stolen at York. In 2014, it was placed on loan to the Dresden Transport Museum in Germany to take part in an exhibition celebrating the 175th anniversary of the Leipzig–Dresden railway due to its similarities to early locomotives built for the line.

== See also ==
- Locomotives of the Furness Railway
