= Bury, Curtis and Kennedy =

- Company type: General partnership
- Industry: Engineering; Heavy industry
- Predecessor: Edward Bury and Company
- Founded: 1826
- Founder: Edward Bury
- Defunct: 1851
- Successor: Bedford, Burys & Company
- Headquarters: Tabley Street (1826); Clarence Foundry, Love Lane (1828), Liverpool, United Kingdom
- Key people: James Kennedy; Timothy Abraham Curtis; John Vernon
- Products: Locomotives; Ships
- Number of employees: 1600

Bury, Curtis and Kennedy was a steam locomotive manufacturer in Liverpool, England.

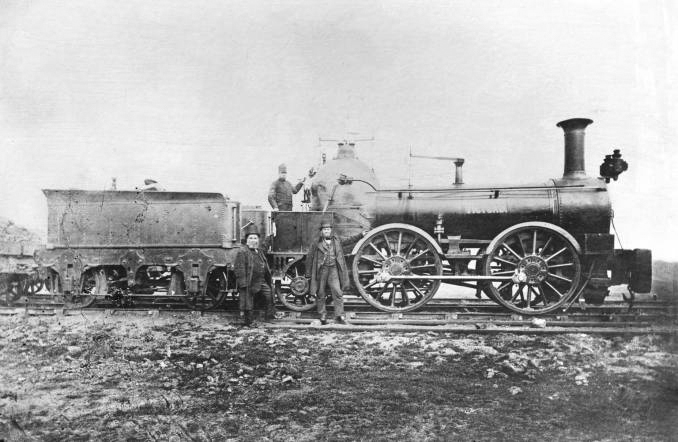
L&YR locomotive Victoria c.1878-80, designed by Bury and built by the Clarence Foundry in 1847, converted later to 0-4-2

Edward Bury established the works in 1826, under the name Edward Bury and Company. He employed James Kennedy as foreman; Kennedy later became a partner. About 1828, the firm moved to bigger premises in Love Lane, Liverpool, known as the Clarence Foundry.

== Locomotives ==
Their first engine was built in 1830. Called Dreadnought, it ran on the Liverpool and Manchester Railway. It was objected to because it was on six wheels and was sold to the Bolton and Leigh Railway. The second, the four-coupled Liverpool, later in 1830, used a cranked driving axle, and was also objected to (by George Stephenson) because the 6 ft diameter wheels were too big.

=== The Bury type ===
However, they refined their designs and the resulting 2-2-0 and 0-4-0 locomotives quickly became a standard which was emulated by many other manufacturers, becoming known as the "Bury type". Distinguishing features of these engines were inside horizontal (or near-horizontal) cylinders, inside wrought-iron bar frame, which gave them a light appearance, and the round firebox (D-shaped in plan), with a large domed top surmounted by a safety valve.

=== Railways supplied ===
Thirteen were supplied to the Great Northern Railway (six of them being sub-contracted to William Fairbairn & Sons), and they became the standard classes on the London and Birmingham Railway, the Eastern Counties Railway, the Midland Counties Railway, the Manchester, Bolton and Bury Canal Navigation and Railway Company, the Lancaster and Preston Railway and the North Union Railway. Several were exported to the US, more than from any other British company except R. Stephenson & Co., and where Bury's "bar-frames" became standard. The firm had a reputation for good workmanship, cheapness and reliability.

== Train operating contract ==
In 1836 Edward Bury was contracted to run the trains of the London and Birmingham Railway at a cost of one farthing per mile per passenger, and a speed not exceeding 22.5 miles per hour (36.2 km/h), with the L&BR providing locomotives to Bury's specification. This contract was annulled in July 1839 because of the unexpected growth in traffic and the increased speed required, and Bury acted thereafter as Locomotive Superintendent of the L&BR in the normal way. The engines he had specified were built by seven different firms, Bury's firm providing 45 of the original stock of 90.

== Formation of partnership ==
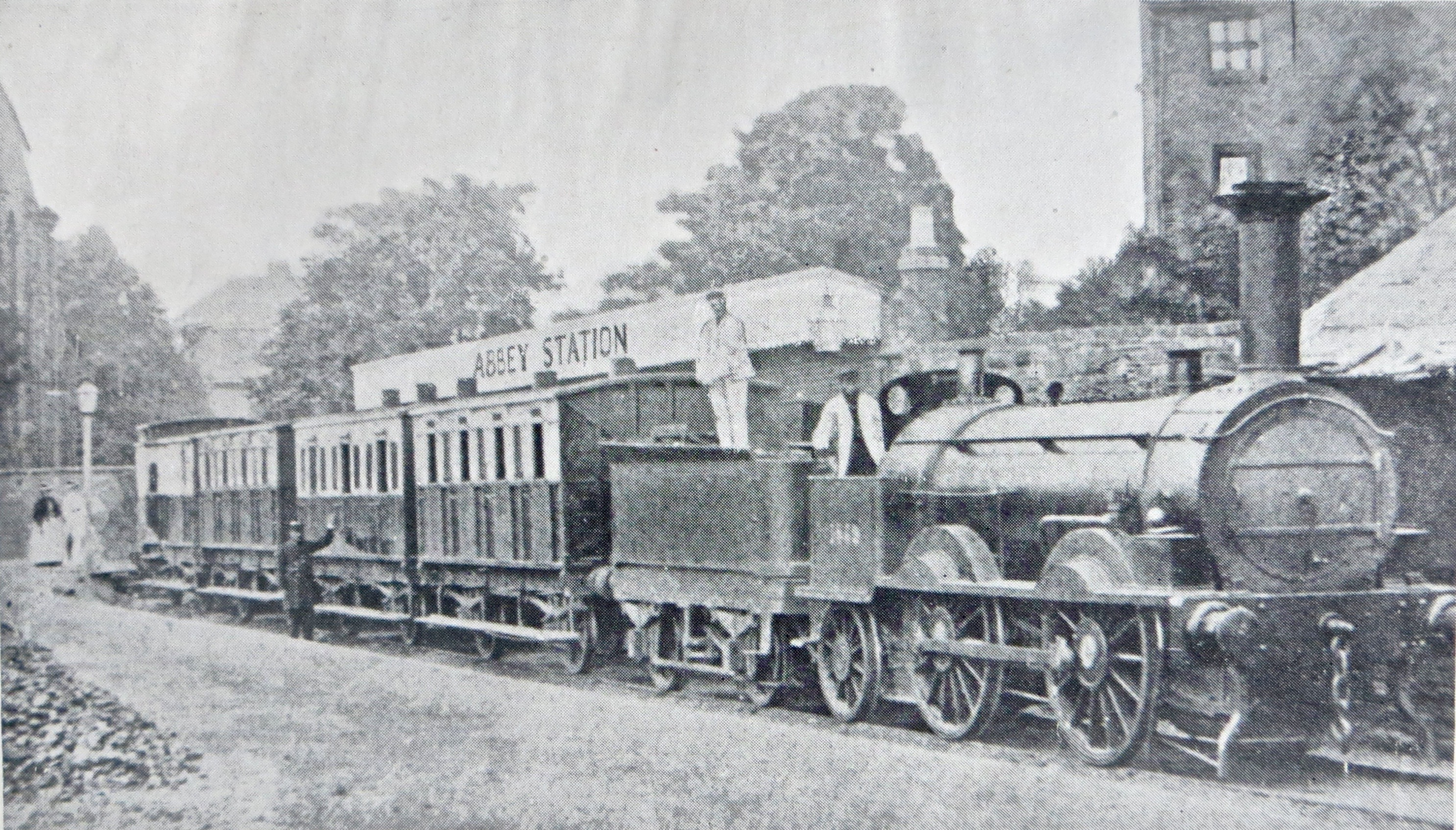
Potteries, Shrewsbury and North Wales train at Abbey Station, Shrewsbury, behind an 1848 Bury, Curtis and Kennedy 0-4-2 locomotive

In 1842, Bury took Kennedy, Timothy Abraham Curtis and John Vernon as partners, and the company changed its name to Bury, Curtis and Kennedy.

Bury continued as Locomotive Superintendent of the London and Birmingham Railway but a few months after it had become part of the London and North Western Railway he resigned in March 1847. In February 1848 he was appointed Locomotive Superintendent of the Great Northern Railway, and in June 1849 became also its general manager.

Meanwhile, the firm of Bury, Curtis & Kennedy continued building locomotives, some of advanced design which had a great influence on subsequent practice, such as the 2-2-2s for the L&NWR which led directly to the Bloomers, as well as one-offs such as the gigantic 6-2-0 Crampton Liverpool for the L&NWR, the most powerful locomotive in the world in 1848. Six 0-4-2 locomotives were built in 1848 for the LNWR (Southern Division) with 16 in. x 20 in. cylinders, 5 ft. driving wheels, and 3 ft. trailing wheels.

== Production ==
In all Bury, Curtis and Kennedy's Clarence Foundry built about 415 locomotives, but they produced much else besides, from church bells to iron ships. At its height, the firm employed 1,600 men.

== Closure ==
The firm lost heavily in making components for the large bascule Blagoveshchensky Bridge over the River Neva at St Petersburg — for which the Imperial Russian Government never paid, according to Bury's widow. This, plus a serious decline in the shipbuilding trade in Liverpool led to the firm's closing down in 1851.

== Preservation ==
Engine No.36 ran from Dublin to Cork, remaining in service until 1874; displayed at the Cork International Exhibition 1902, British Empire Exhibition, Railway Centenary, 1925 and the bi-centenary of the Royal Dublin Society, 1930.

Two of the firm's locomotives have been preserved, Furness Railway 0-4-0 No. 3 (nicknamed "Old Coppernob" or "Coppernob"), built in 1846, now in the National Railway Museum, York and Great Southern and Western Railway 2-2-2 No. 36, built in 1847, now at Cork Kent railway station, Cork, Ireland.

== See also ==
- B. Hick and Sons
- Rothwell and Company
- George Forrester and Company
- Nasmyth, Gaskell and Company
- Locomotives of the London and North Western Railway
- Midland Counties Railway Locomotives
