= Midland Counties Railway Locomotives =

In its short life, the Midland Counties Railway bought nearly fifty steam locomotives from a number of manufacturers. Initially, outside-cylindered engines were ordered because of the frequency of crank axle breakage with inside cylinders. However, one of the sub-committee delegated to order the motive power, Theodore Rathbone, was an admirer of the Bury engines used on the London and Birmingham Railway, and all further orders were for inside-cylindered locos. The initial delivery of engines had 11-inch cylinders, but after being found to be short of power, further orders were for engines with 13-inch cylinders.

== Builders ==
=== Butterley Company ===
Butterley Company, Derbyshire

- 1. Ariel 2-2-2 built 1839 Driving wheels 5'0" diameter, Cylinders 11x16 (outside)

(renamed Bee in 1841)

- 2. Hercules 2-2-2 built 1840 Driving wheels 5'6" diameter, Cylinders 13x18 (outside)

Ariel hauled one of the inaugural trains from Nottingham to Derby, following Sunbeam. Nevertheless, the Butterley locos would not appear to have been satisfactory, since the railway refused to pay for them until the end of 1841.

=== Jones, Turner and Evans ===
Jones, Turner and Evans, Newton-le-Willows

- 4. Sunbeam 2-2-0 built 1839 Driving wheels 5'6" diameter, Cylinders 12x18
- 5. Wizard 2-2-0 built 1839 Driving wheels 5'6" diameter, Cylinders 12x18
- 6. Hecate 2-2-0 built 1839 Driving wheels 5'6" diameter, Cylinders 12x18

Four coupled:

- 46. Fox 0-4-2 built 1840 Driving wheels 5'0" diameter, Cylinders 13x20
- 47. Rob Roy 0-4-2 (? 2-2-2) 1839 Driving wheels 5'6" diameter, Cylinders 13x18

=== Stark and Fulton ===
Stark and Fulton, Glasgow

- 3. Hawk 2-2-0 built 1839 Driving wheels 5'6" diameter, Cylinders 12x18
- 9. Vulture 2-2-0 built 1839 Driving wheels 5'6" diameter, Cylinders 12x18
- 10. Eagle 2-2-0 built 1839 Driving wheels 5'6" diameter, Cylinders 12x18

=== Edward Bury and Company ===
Edward Bury and Company, Liverpool

- 7. Lion 2-2-0 built 1839 Driving wheels 5'6" diameter, Cylinders 12x18
- 8. Tiger 2-2-0 built 1839 Driving wheels 5'6" diameter, Cylinders 12x18
- 11. Leopard 2-2-0 built 1840 Driving wheels 5'6" diameter, Cylinders 12x18
- 12. Panther 2-2-0 built 1840 Driving wheels 5'6" diameter, Cylinders 12x18
- 13. Reindeer ' 2-2-0 built 1840 Driving wheels 5'6" diameter, Cylinders 12x18
- 14. Antelope 2-2-0 built 1840 Driving wheels 5'6" diameter, Cylinders 12x18
- 15. Unicorn 2-2-0 built 1840 Driving wheels 5'6" diameter, Cylinders 12x18

Leopard hauled the inaugural train from Nottingham to Leicester

- 16. Cerberus 2-2-0 built 1840 Driving wheels 5'6" diameter, Cylinders 13x18
- 17. Caliban 2-2-0 built 1840 Driving wheels 5'6" diameter, Cylinders 13x18
- 18. Basilisk 2-2-0 built 1840 Driving wheels 5'6" diameter, Cylinders 13x18
- 19. Phantom 2-2-0 built 1840 Driving wheels 5'6" diameter, Cylinders 13x18
- 35. Vizier 2-2-0 built 1841 Driving wheels 5'6" diameter, Cylinders 13x18
- 36. Vandal 2-2-0 built 1841 Driving wheels 5'6" diameter, Cylinders 13x18
- 37. Siren 2-2-0 built 1841 Driving wheels 5'6" diameter, Cylinders 13x18
- 38. Sultan 2-2-0 built 1841 Driving wheels 5'6" diameter, Cylinders 13x18

Four Coupled

- 42. Buffalo 0-4-0 built 1840 Driving wheels 5'0" diameter, Cylinders 13x18
- 43. Bloodhound 0-4-0 built 1840 Driving wheels 5'0" diameter, Cylinders 13x18
- 44. Mastiff 0-4-0 built 1840 Driving wheels 5'0" diameter, Cylinders 13x18
- 45. Mammoth 0-4-0 built 1841 Driving wheels 5'0" diameter, Cylinders 13x18

=== Nasmyth, Gaskell and Company ===
Nasmyth, Gaskell and Company, Patricroft

- 20. Lightning 2-2-0 built 1840 Driving wheels 5'6" diameter, Cylinders 12x18
- 21. Lucifer 2-2-0 built 1840 Driving wheels 5'6" diameter, Cylinders 12x18
- 22. Hurricane 2-2-0 built 1840 Driving wheels 5'6" diameter, Cylinders 12x18
- 23. Firebrand 2-2-0 built 1840 Driving wheels 5'6" diameter, Cylinders 12x18
- 24. Rainbow 2-2-0 built 1840 Driving wheels 5'6" diameter, Cylinders 12x18
- 25. Sirocco 2-2-0 built 1840 Driving wheels 5'6" diameter, Cylinders 12x18
- 39. Wolf 2-2-2 built 1840 Driving wheels 5'0" diameter, Cylinders 14x18

(presumably bought as a freight engine)

=== William Fairbairn & Sons ===
William Fairbairn & Sons, Liverpool

- 40. Harlequin 0-4-0 built 1840 Driving wheels 5'0" diameter, Cylinders 12x18

(renamed Shark in 1842/3)

- 41. Ganymede 0-4-0 built 1840 Driving wheels 5'0" diameter, Cylinders 12x18

=== Benjamin Hick and Sons ===
Benjamin Hick and Sons, Bolton

- 26. Dragon 2-2-0 built 1840 Driving wheels 5'6" diameter, Cylinders 12x18
- 27. Scorpion 2-2-0 built 1840 Driving wheels 5'6" diameter, Cylinders 12x18
- 28. Hornet 2-2-0 built 1840 Driving wheels 5'6" diameter, Cylinders 12x18
- 29. Wivern 2-2-0 built 1840 Driving wheels 5'6" diameter, Cylinders 12x18
- 30. Vampire 2-2-0 built 1840 Driving wheels 5'6" diameter, Cylinders 12x18
- 31. Lynx 2-2-0 built 1840 Driving wheels 5'6" diameter, Cylinders 12x18
- 32. Centaur 2-2-0 built 1841 Driving wheels 5'6" diameter, Cylinders 13x18
- 33. Hydra 2-2-0 built 1841 Driving wheels 5'6" diameter, Cylinders 13x18
- 34. Harpy 2-2-0 built 1841 Driving wheels 5'6" diameter, Cylinders 13x18

== Contractors locomotives ==
Vivid, which opened the line from Leicester to Rugby, was a contractor's locomotive.
