= Class 115 =

Class 115 may refer to:

- British Rail Class 115, a British diesel multiple unit class
- Midland Railway 115 Class, a British steam locomotive class
- Furness Railway 115 class, a British steam locomotive class
- DB Class 115, a German electric locomotive class
