= Class 120 =

Class 120 may refer to:

- DB Class 120, a class of electric locomotives operated by DB Fernverkehr in Germany.
- British Rail Class 120, a type of diesel railcar built by Swindon Works for British Rail.
- Renfe Class 120, a type of electric multiple units used in Spain.
- OSE Class 120, a class of electric locomotives operated by Hellenic Train.
- Furness Railway 120 Class, a class of four 4-4-0 steam locomotives.
- DR Class 120, a Soviet-built diesel locomotive for heavy freight trains.
