= Stark and Fulton =

Scottish engineering company

- Headquarters: Glasgow, Scotland

Stark and Fulton was an engineering company in Glasgow, Scotland. Little is known about the company except that it built some of the first steam locomotives for the Glasgow, Paisley, Kilmarnock and Ayr Railway and the Midland Counties Railway around 1840. For about four months, D B Stark was a loco superintendent of the former line.

== Locomotives ==
Those for the GPK&AR were Stuart and Bute. They were probably similar to those for the MCR and of the 2-2-0 "Bury" type. The MCR locos were Hawk, Vulture and Eagle, with 5'6" driving wheels 5'6" and cylinders 12"x18". These were supplied in 1839 and four more were supplied to the GPK&R in 1840: Mercury (No 1), Mazeppa (No 2), Wallace and Queen. In 1849, they supplied one of 2-2-2 formation for use on the Caledonian and Dumbartonshire Junction Railway, which later became part of the Edinburgh and Glasgow Railway.
