= Edward Bury =

English locomotive manufacturer (1794–1858)

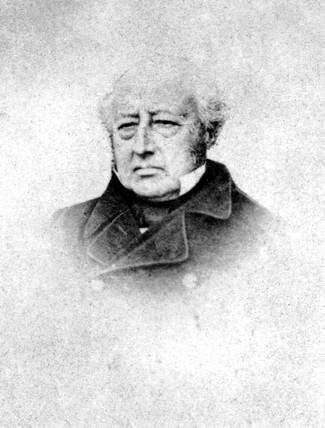
- by Unknown 1850s
- Born: 22 October 1794; Salford, Lancashire, England
- Died: 25 November 1858 (aged 64); Scarborough, Yorkshire, England
- Spouse: Priscilla Susan Bury (née Falkner)
- Children: 3
- Engineering career
- Institutions: Royal Society (1844); Royal Astronomical Society; Royal Historical Society; Smeatonian Society of Civil Engineers; Institution of Civil Engineers

Edward Bury (22 October 1794 – 25 November 1858) was an English locomotive manufacturer. Born in Salford, Lancashire, he was the son of a timber merchant and was educated at Chester.

== Career ==
By 1823 he was a partner in Gregson and Bury's steam sawmill at Toxteth Park, Liverpool, but in 1826 he set himself up as an iron-founder and engineer. His original premises were in Tabley Street near the Liverpool and Manchester Railway's (LMR) workshops. He hoped to supply locomotives to that line, but opposition from the LMR Engineer, George Stephenson, thwarted this.

=== Clarence Foundry & Steam Engine Works ===
He moved his works to new premises in Love Lane, Liverpool, on the Leeds and Liverpool Canal and near the Clarence Dock, hence the name 'Clarence Foundry and Steam Engine Works'. Around this time he recruited as his manager James Kennedy, who had gained locomotive building experience working for George Stephenson and Mather, Dixon and Company. The first locomotive built by Edward Bury and Company, Dreadnought, was intended to compete in the Rainhill Trials, but could not be finished in time. It was a 0-6-0 and did some ballasting work on the LMR but is said to have been objected to because it was on six wheels. It was sold to the Bolton and Leigh Railway in 1831.

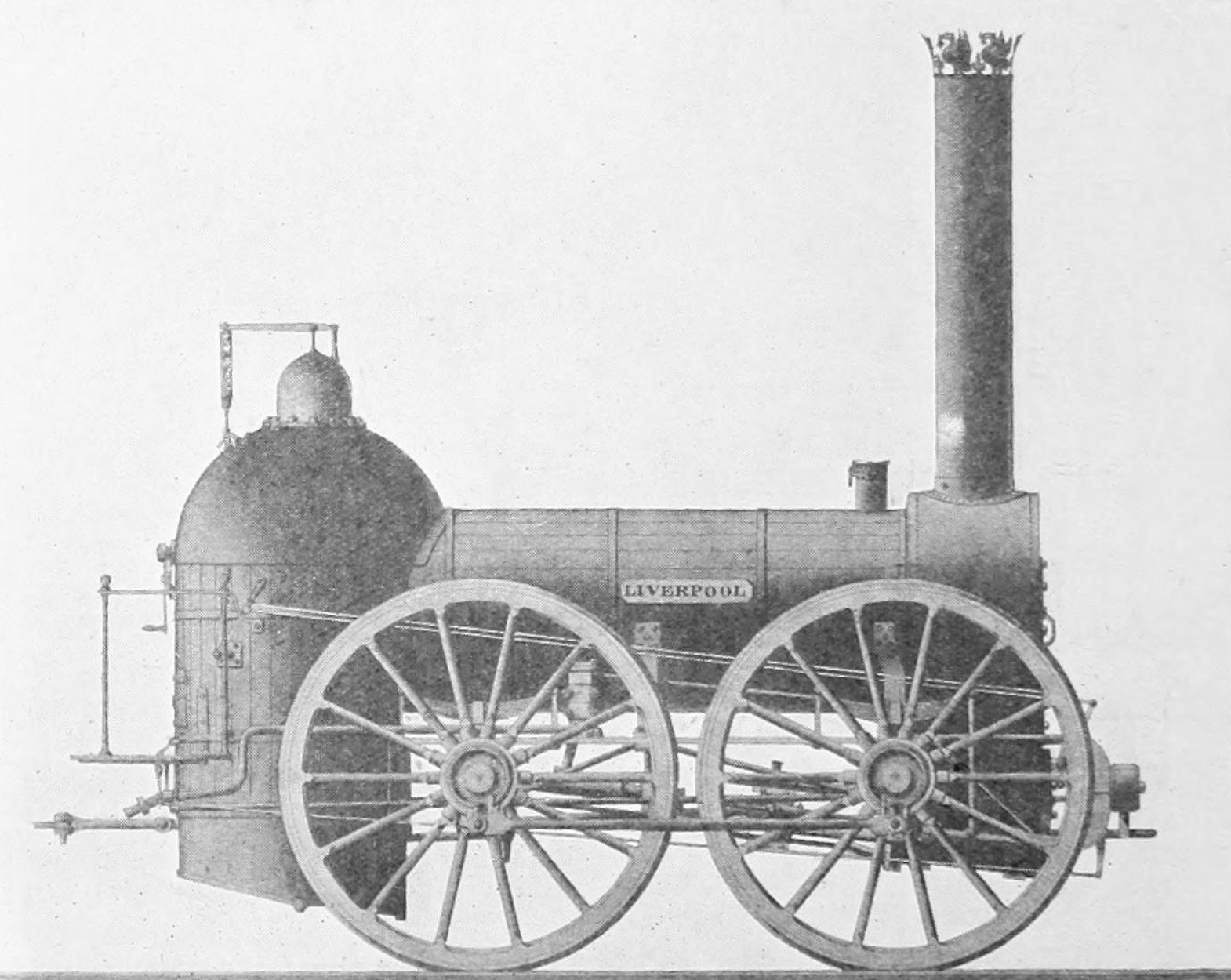
Liverpool, as built for the Liverpool and Manchester Railway in 1830 with 6-foot wheels.

Bury's second locomotive Liverpool was on four wheels, and was tried on the LMR but the objection this time was to the size of the wheels, 6 ft (1.8 m) in diameter, described as "dangerous" by George Stephenson. The wheels were reduced to 4 ft 6 in (1.37 m), but this engine also went to the Bolton Leigh. Thereafter, Bury only succeeded in selling one engine, Liver, to the Liverpool and Manchester Railway.

Liverpool combined near-horizontal inside cylinders with a multitubular boiler and a round, dome-topped firebox, mounted on a simple wrought-iron bar-frame inside the wheels, rather than wooden outside frames and inside iron sub-frames. This was a well thought-out and advanced design, which lasted. Most subsequent Bury locomotives followed this same basic design, which was copied by other firms, in Europe and the U.S.A.

=== London and Birmingham Railway ===
In 1836 Bury became the Contractor for Locomotive Power on the new London and Birmingham Railway (L&BR); the railway company would provide locomotives to Bury's specification, while he would maintain them in good repair and convey each passenger at a farthing per mile, and each ton of goods at one halfpenny per mile; the passenger trains to be limited to 12 carriages and the speed not to exceed 22.5 mph (36.2 km/h). This system never worked in practice and in July 1839 the contract was annulled, and Bury became the Manager of the Locomotive Department, paid in the normal way, with a profit-linked bonus. At first he adopted a strict policy of using only 4-wheeled engines. Of the L&BR's original 90 engines, Bury's firm built exactly half.

=== Birmingham and Gloucester Railway ===
In 1838 Bury was appointed as locomotive agent and advisor to the Birmingham and Gloucester Railway (B&GR). (Note: This was not a full time appointment) Bury immediately sourced two secondhand locomotives and the building of four Forrester singles. (Note: For whatever reason Bury did not supply his own locomotives, this may have been due to full order books from elsewhere or other reasons) Bury refused to supply locomotives for the steep Lickey Incline, though was contracted to design a stationary engine for the slope. The B&GR's engineer Captain Moorsom overrode Bury and purchased from Norris Locomotive Works of America not only bank engines for Lickey Incline but further locomotives for the railway as well.

=== Bury, Curtis and Kennedy ===
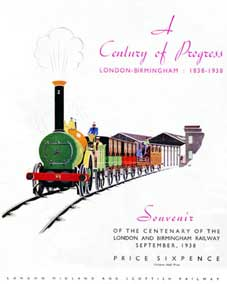
London and Birmingham Railway Centenary, 1938 souvenir from the LMS illustrating the 2-2-0 locomotive of Edward Bury

After taking into partnership his manager James Kennedy, together with Timothy Abraham Curtis and John Vernon, the firm was renamed Bury, Curtis and Kennedy in 1842.

=== London and North Western Railway ===
The L&BR became part of the London and North Western Railway (LNWR) in 1846; Bury continued as Locomotive Superintendent of the Southern Division of the LNWR, but resigned with effect from March 1847.

=== Great Northern Railway ===
He became Locomotive Engineer on the new Great Northern Railway (GNR) in February 1848 and created such a good impression that in June 1849 he was also appointed General Manager of the line. After a (possibly malicious) accusation that he had placed a small order for ironwork with a firm with which he was associated, he resigned from the GNR in March 1850.

=== Bedford, Burys & Co ===
In 1852 he went into partnership in a Sheffield steelworks with Charles Cammell, and in 1855 he started another steelworks with his son, William Tarleton Bury, and John Bedford, as Bedford, Burys & Co, Regent Works, Sheffield. He had advised on the building of three railway towns, Swindon, Wolverton and Doncaster.

== Honours ==
His engineering achievements were recognised when in 1844 he was elected a Fellow of the Royal Society. He was also a Fellow of the Royal Astronomical Society, a Fellow of the Royal Historical Society, a Member of the Smeatonian Society of Civil Engineers, and a Member of the Institution of Civil Engineers.

== Family ==
He married on 4 March 1830 Priscilla Susan Falkner (1799–1872), a botanist and illustrator and daughter of a wealthy Liverpool merchant. Between 1852 and 1860, Bury and his family lived at Hillsborough Hall. A plaque by the front door of the present-day building commemorates the family's residency.

== Death ==
He retired to Croft Lodge, Ambleside, but became ill in 1858 and died on 25 November at Scarborough. He was buried in Dean Road cemetery, plot C 33-9, which is now unmarked by any monument.

In 1860 his widow published an account of her husband, Recollections of Edward Bury, Fellow of the Royal Society, Member of the institute of Civil Engineers, Member of the Smeatonian Society, Fellow of the Royal Astronomical Society, Fellow of the Royal Historic Society by his widow.
