= Furness Railway 94 class =

Class of 4 British 0-6-2T locomotives

Furness Railway 94 class ‘Improved Cleator Tanks’
Type and origin
- Power type: Steam
- Designer: William Frank Pettigrew
- Builder: Kitson and Company
- Serial number: 4855–4856, 5042–5043
- Build date: 1912 (2), 1914 (2)
- Total produced: 4
Specifications
- Configuration
  - Whyte: 0-6-2T
  - UIC: C1 n2t
- Gauge: 4 ft 8 1/2 in (1,435 mm)
- Driver dia.: 4 ft 7 1/2 in (1.410 m)
- Trailing dia.: 3 ft 8 1/2 in (1.130 m)
- Wheelbase: 20 ft 8 in (6.3 m)
- Length: 30 ft 0.5 in (9.2 m) (1912); 35 ft 6.5 in (10.8 m) (1914)
- Height: 13 ft 0 in (3.962 m)
- Loco weight: 1912: 56 long tons 18 cwt (127,500 lb or 57.8 t); 1914: 58 long tons 12 cwt (131,300 lb or 59.5 t)
- Fuel type: Coal
- Boiler pressure: 170 psi (1.17 MPa)
- Heating surface: 1912: 1,016 sq ft (94.4 m^{2}); 1914: 1,246 sq ft (115.8 m^{2})
- Cylinders: Two
- Cylinder size: 18 in × 26 in (457 mm × 660 mm)
Career
- Operators: Furness Railway; → London, Midland and Scottish Railway
- Class: FR: 94 class
- Numbers: 1912: FR: 94–95; 1914: FR 92–93; → LMS: 11641–11644
- Withdrawn: 1929–1934
- Disposition: All scrapped

The Furness Railway 94 class (unofficially classified L4 by Bob Rush), or "Improved Cleator Tanks", were built to haul mineral trains from inland to the blast furnaces on the coast around Workington.

== Variations ==
The first two locos, numbers 94 & 95 were fitted with smokebox superheaters, with the smokebox extended to accommodate this and the chimney set far forward. The apparatus was obviously unsuccessful, as a subsequent order for a further two locos, numbers 92 and 93 omitted this, having instead an extended boiler with the frames being extended to accommodate.

== Use ==
The locomotives operated on the northern part of the Furness Railway, particularly on the tracks of the Whitehaven, Cleator and Egremont Railway and the Cleator and Workington Junction Railway in the Cleator and Frizington areas. Here they hauled trains of Haemetite Ore over the steep and sharply curved lines linking the mines to the coast.

== Numbering ==
By 1923 and the grouping of the FR into the London, Midland and Scottish Railway all four engines were still in service, and received the LMS numbers 11641–11644. The locos were withdrawn between 1929 and 1934.

Table of locomotives
Date new	FR No.	LMS No.	Date withdrawn
1912	94	11641	November 1935
1912	95	11642	September 1929
1914	92	11643	August 1934
1914	93	11644	August 1932
