= Furness Railway M1 Class =

British steam locomotive class (1915–16)

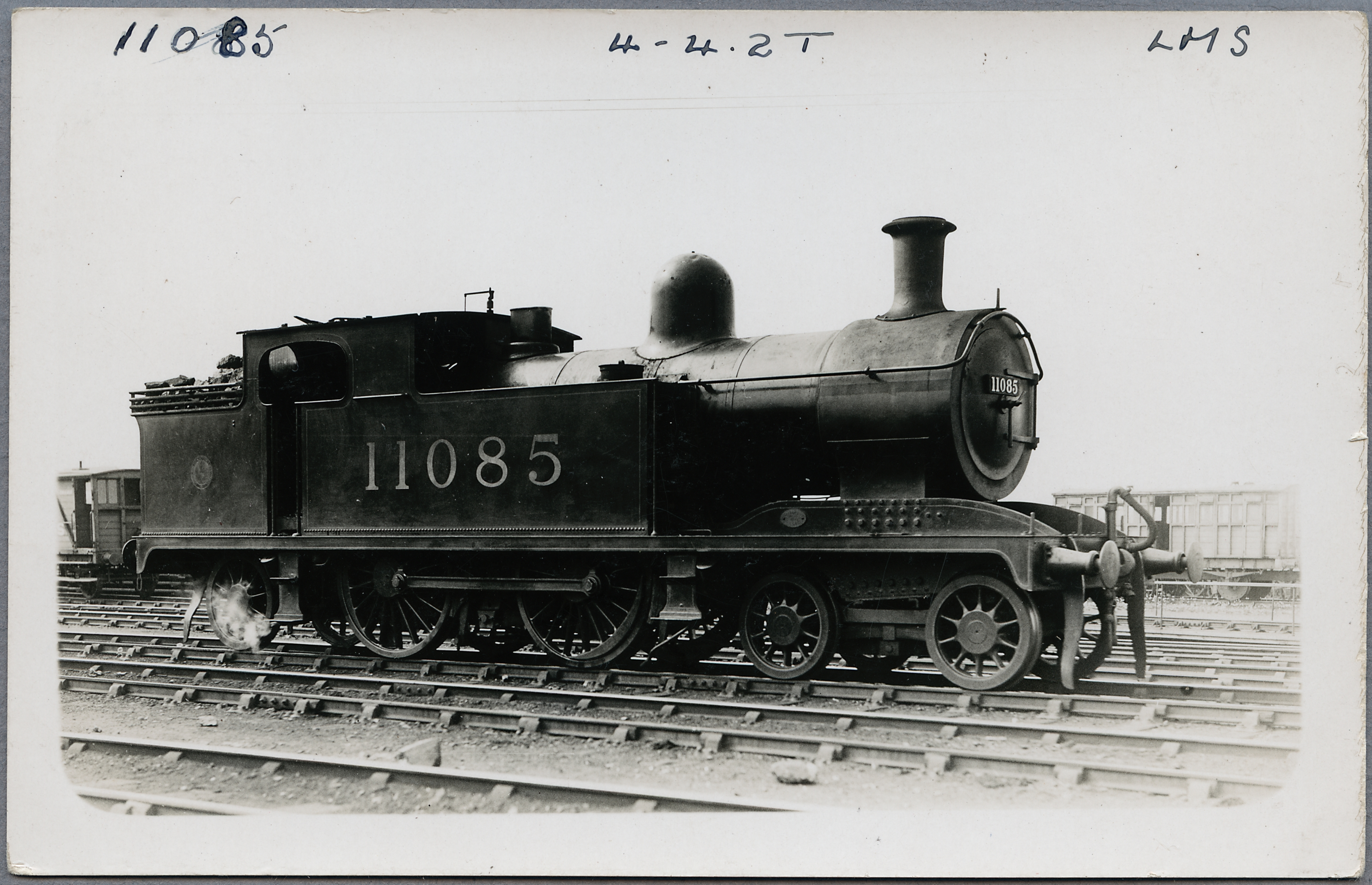
Type and origin
- Power type: Steam
- Designer: W. F. Pettigrew
- Builder: Kitson and Company and Vulcan Foundry
- Build date: 1915-1916
- Total produced: 6
Specifications
- Configuration
  - Whyte: 4-4-2T
- Gauge: 4 ft 8 1/2 in (1,435 mm) standard gauge
- Leading dia.: 3 ft 2 in (970 mm)
- Driver dia.: 5 ft 8 in (1,730 mm)
- Trailing dia.: 3 ft 8 in (1,120 mm), 3 ft (910 mm) in Nº40 and Nº41
- Length: 38 ft 3 in (11.66 m)
- Boiler pressure: 160 psi (1,100 kPa)
- Heating surface
  - Tubes and flues: 208 (2) 220 (4)
- Cylinders: Two, inside
- Cylinder size: 17.5 in × 24 in (444 mm × 610 mm)
- Valve gear: Stephenson
- Valve type: Slide valves
Performance figures
- Tractive effort: 14,700 lbf (65 kN)
Career
- Operators: Furness Railway; London, Midland and Scottish Railway
- Number in class: 6
- Numbers: FR: 38-43; LMS: 11080-11085
- Delivered: 1915-1916
- First run: 1915
- Last run: 1932
- Withdrawn: 1930-1932
- Disposition: All scrapped.

The Furness Railway 38 Class (classified "M1" by Bob Rush) were a class of six 4-4-2 tank engines that were built for the Furness Railway by Kitson and Vulcan Foundry from 1915 to 1916.

These engines were built for the summer season traffic on the Furness's Lakeside, Coniston and Kendal branches.

== Numbering ==
Table of locomotives
FR no.	LMS no.	Builder	Delivered	Withdrawn
38	11080	Kitson and Company	1915	1930
39	11081	Kitson and Company	1915	1932
40	11082	Vulcan Foundry	1916	1930
41	11083	Vulcan Foundry	1916	1932
42	11084	Kitson and Company	1915	1930
43	11085	Kitson and Company	1915	1931
