= Furness Railway Class 19 =

Class of British 0-6-0T locomotives

Furness Railway Class 19 Furness Railway Class G5
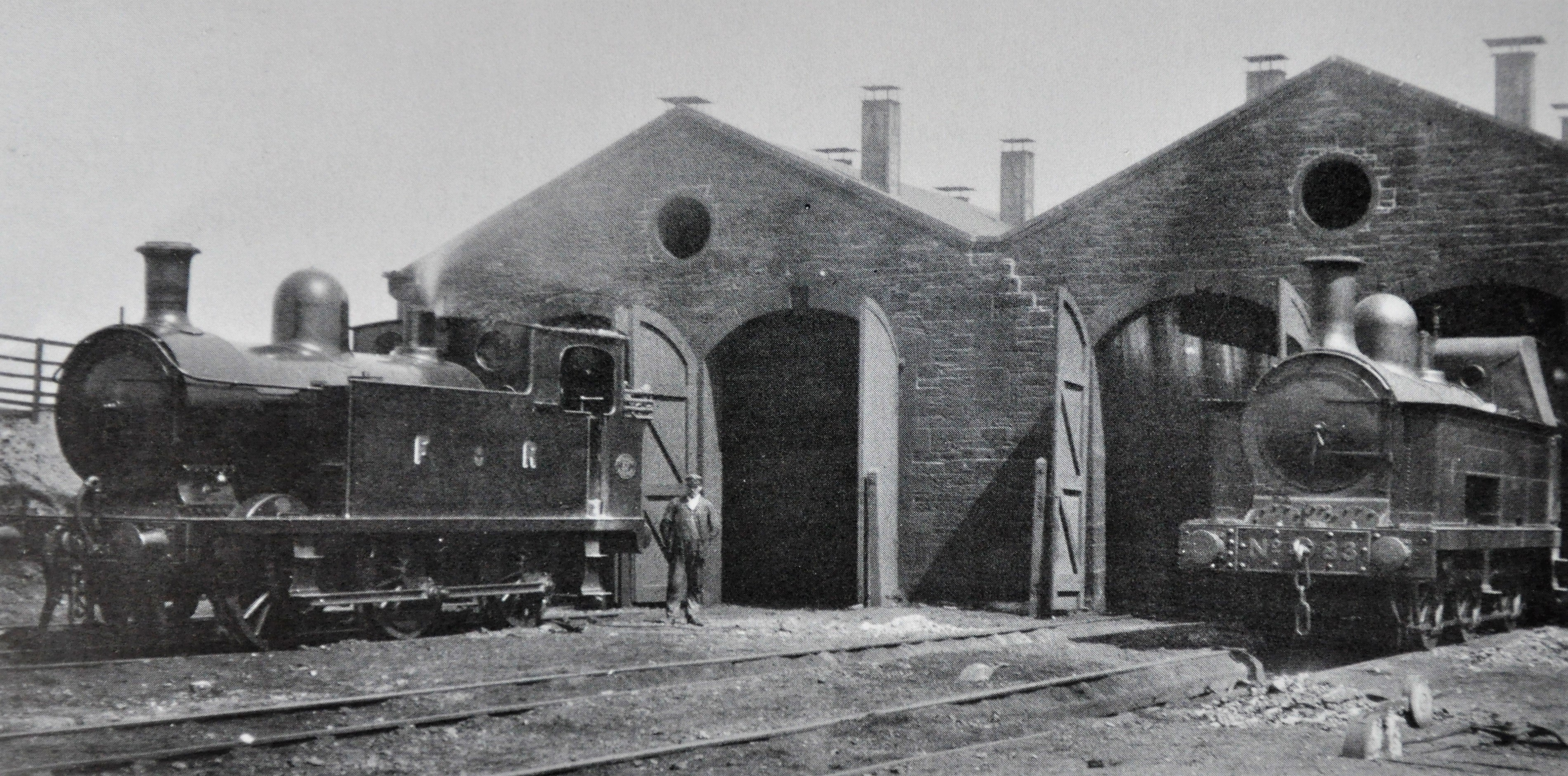
- Furness Railway G5 Class No. 57 (left) and Furness Railway G1 Class No. 83 (right) at Moor Row Shed, c 1910s.
Type and origin
- Power type: Steam
- Designer: William Frank Pettigrew
- Builder: Vulcan Foundry (8); Kitson & Company (2)
- Serial number: Vulcan Foundry : 2523–2528, 3174–3175; Kitson : 5121–5122
- Build date: 1910, 1915-1916
- Total produced: 10
Specifications
- Configuration
  - Whyte: 0-6-0T
- Gauge: 1,435 mm (4 ft 8 1/2 in)
- Driver dia.: 4 ft 7 1/2 in (1.410 m)
- Wheelbase
  - Drivers: 15 ft 0 in (4.57 m)
- Axle load: 39,200 lb (17.5 long tons; 17.8 t)
- Loco weight: 49.49 long tons (50.28 t; 55.43 short tons)
- Fuel capacity: 2 long tons (2.0 t; 2.2 short tons)
- Water cap.: 1,260 imp gal (5,700 L; 1,510 US gal)
- Firebox
  - Grate area: 15.40 ft^{2} (1.431 m^{2})
- Boiler pressure: 160 psi (1,100 kPa)
- Heating surface
  - Firebox: 88 ft^{2} (8.2 m^{2})
- Cylinders: 2
- High-pressure cylinder: 17.5 in × 24 in (440 mm × 610 mm)
- Valve gear: Walschaerts
Performance figures
- Tractive effort: 18,011 lbf (80.12 kN)
Career
- Operators: Furness Railway; London Midland & Scottish Railway
- Numbers: FR: 19–24 (later 51-60); LMS: 11553-11562
- First run: 1910
- Withdrawn: 1930-1936 (9); 1942 (1)
- Disposition: All scrapped

The Furness Railway Class 19 (classified "G5" by Bob Rush) were a group of ten 0-6-0 tank locomotives designed by W. F. Pettigrew. Eight were manufactured by the Vulcan Foundry and two by Kitson and Company in 1910 and from 1915 to 1916. All ten were passed over to the London, Midland and Scottish Railway (LMS) in the 1923 grouping. They were all withdrawn between 1930 and 1942.

== History ==
=== Design ===
In 1910, W. F. Pettigrew, locomotive superintendent for the Furness Railway, designed the class to replace the older Class G1 "Neddies" for shunting and small freight work. The new engines were utilised the standard 4 ft 7 1/2 in (1.410 m) wheels and 17.5 in × 24 in (440 mm × 610 mm) cylinders to increase power output.

=== Construction ===
Six were initially built by the Vulcan Foundry in 1910 and numbered 19–24. Two more were ordered during World War I and built by Kitson & Co in 1915, numbered 51–52. These were followed by a final pair built by Vulcan in 1916 and numbered 53–54. The original 1910 locomotives were renumbered 55–60 to maintain sequence with the later built engines.

=== Service life ===
The G5 class were initially used as shunters at Barrow Docks and also bankers at Lindal-in-Furness. The class would later be fitted for passenger services, but rarely used as such. All ten passed into LMS ownership in 1923, being renumbered 11553–11562.

=== Withdrawal ===
Trade reductions in the 1930s due to the Great Slump of Britain rendered the class obsolete. Six were withdrawn and scrapped between 1930 and 1932 despite being in serviceable condition. Three more were withdrawn between 1934 and 1936, with only 11553 remaining. 11553 was ultimately retired in 1942 and scrapped at Horwich the following year.
