= Haycock boiler =

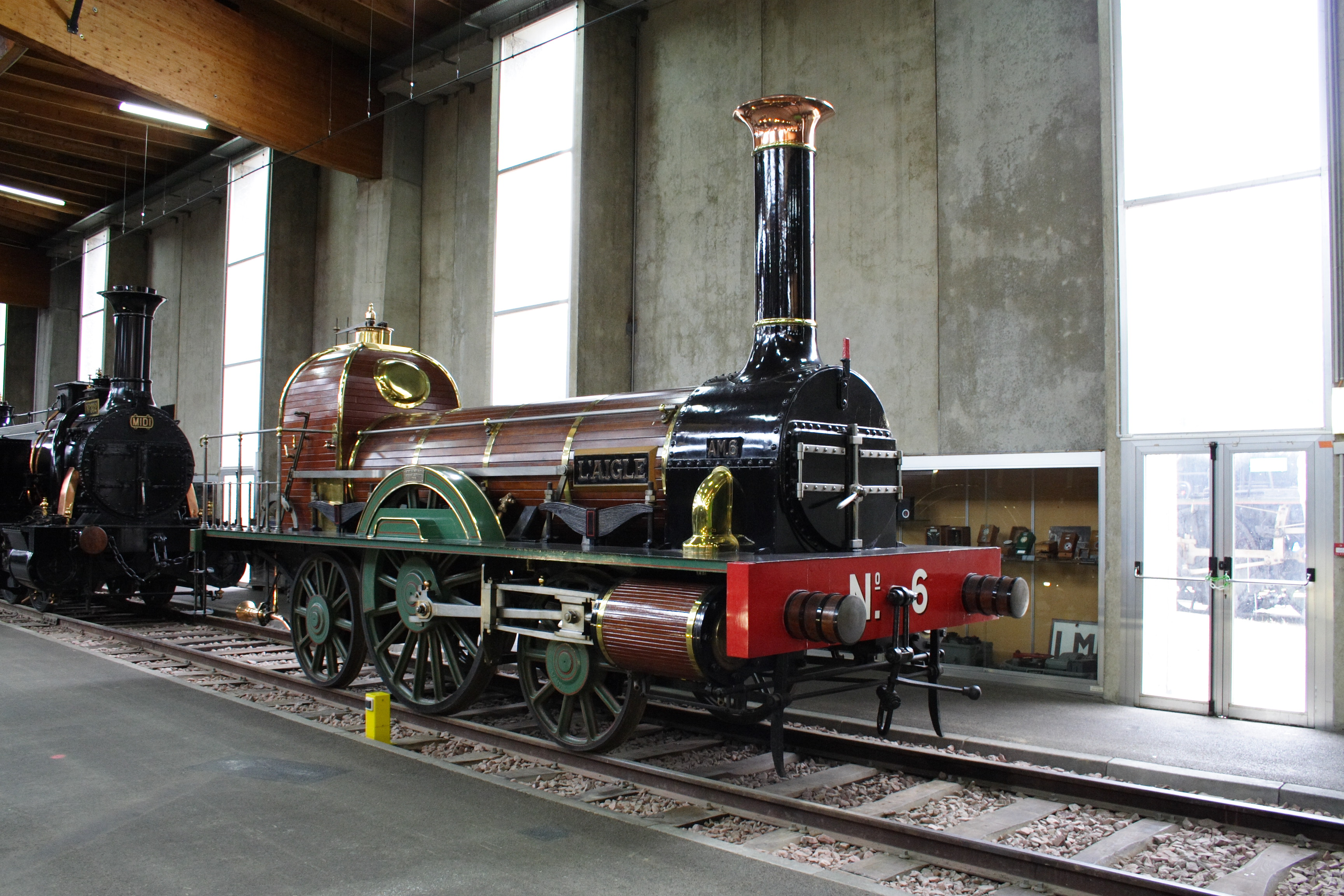
French locomotive L'Aigle

A haycock boiler is an early form of steam locomotive boiler with a prominently raised firebox of "Gothic arch", "haystack", or "coppernob" shape. The term haystack is most commonly used, but is avoided here as it is confusingly used for three quite different forms of boiler. This particularly large outer firebox served as the steam dome and was often highly decorated with polished brass. These were popular for early railway locomotives, from 1840 to the 1850s.

== Haystack firebox ==
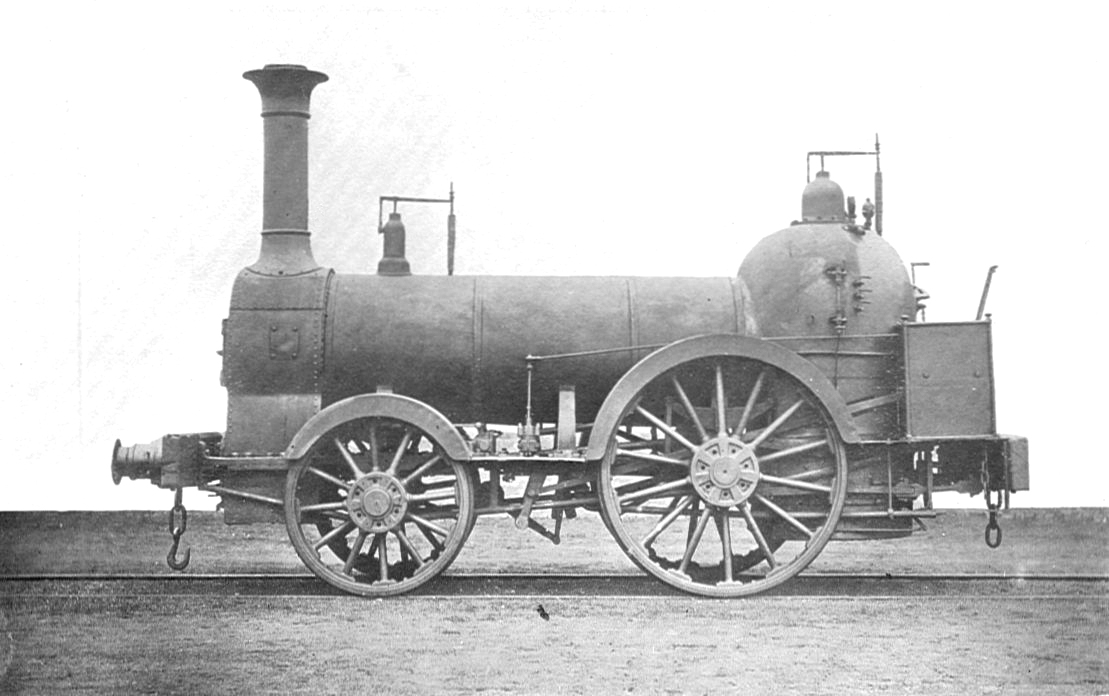
London & Birmingham Railway 2-2-0 Bury locomotive

The prominently raised firebox first appeared in 1830, in Bury's 0-4-0 locomotive Liverpool. This was the progenitor of his bar-frame locomotives and shared their distinctive boiler design. The inner firebox was D-shaped in plan, with a flat tubeplate. Fireboxes of this time did not yet have a brick arch and so the Bury firebox was relatively short in length but tall, to give an adequate length of combustion path. The outer firebox was a vertical cylinder, formed into a tall hemispherical dome above it. Later Bury designs were flattened on top and became known as "haystacks".

== Gothic arch firebox ==
A regular problem with early steam locomotives was that of priming, the carry-over of water with the steam. Many varieties of steam dome on the boiler barrel were tried to avoid this, by taking the steam outlet from as high as possible above the waterline. Stephenson's Rocket of 1829 had used such a small steam dome. In the 1830s, domes became extravagantly large. A drawback to fitting such large domes was the weakening of the boiler shell where such a large hole was cut into it.

In 1840, Stephenson produced their 2-2-2 design which avoided the dome altogether, in favour of a raised firebox in the Bury style of ten years earlier. Boiler power had increased considerably over the decade, now requiring a larger fire grate area. The inner and outer fireboxes were square in plan, with flat sides that required staying. At the top these four sides were vaulted inwards to a point, having a profile approximating a then-fashionable Gothic arch. These provided a large steam space above the waterline, but their flat surfaces limited working pressure.

Stephenson used the Gothic arch firebox for their long-boiler locomotives as well, including their 2-2-2 North Star of 1841 and outside-cylindered 2-2-2s for the Yarmouth and Norwich Railway in 1844.

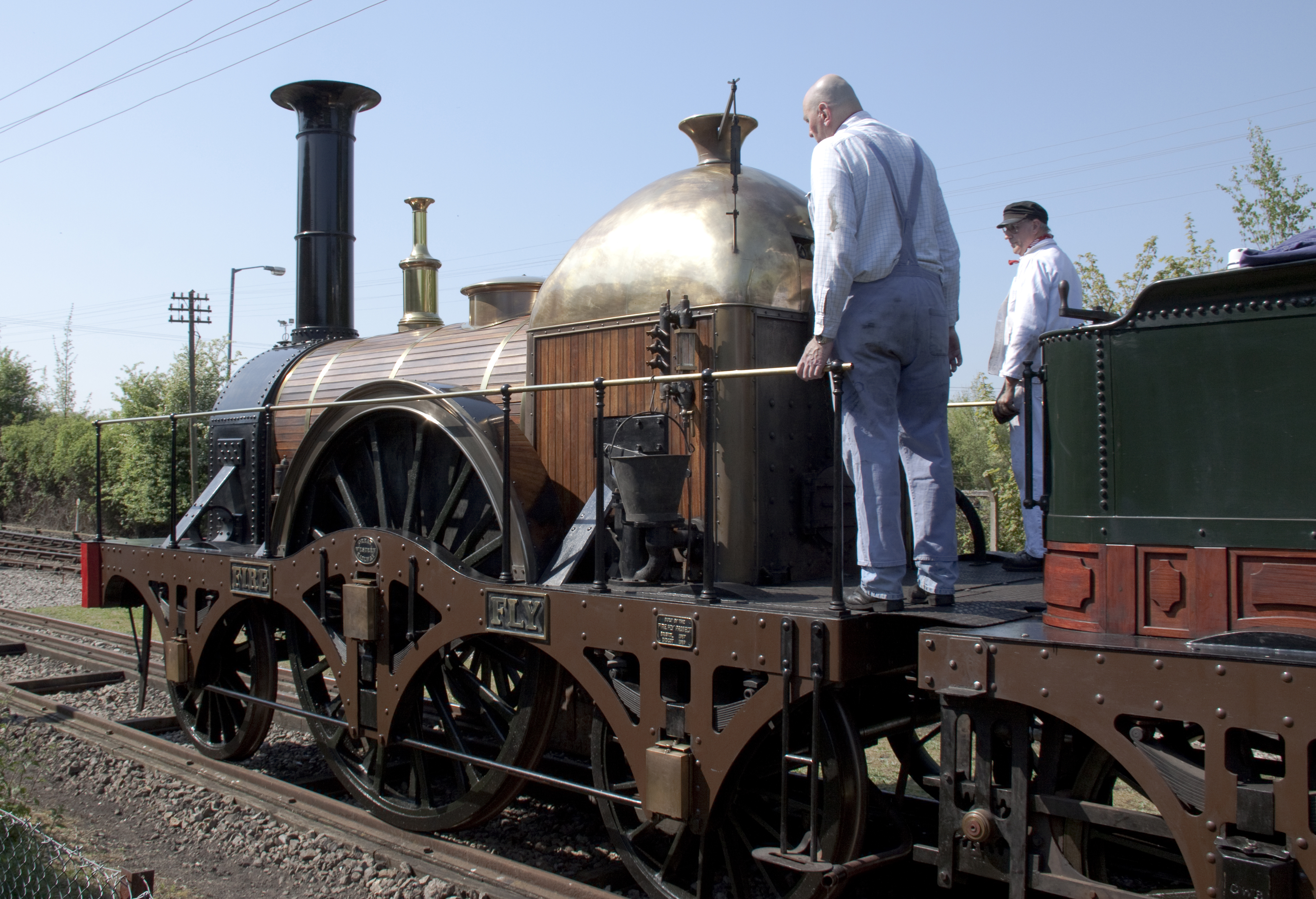
GWR Firefly class replica

The Gothic arch firebox was also notably used by a number of Gooch's Great Western Railway broad-gauge locomotives, including the Firefly, Leo and Hercules classes of 1840-1842. The last class to use them was the Premier class of 1846–7, which were also the first locomotives to be constructed at the new Swindon Works. GWR locomotives after this, from the Pyracmon class, used Gooch's stronger round-topped firebox with its wrapper raised above the boiler barrel.

One well-known locomotive that no longer uses a haycock boiler, despite its external appearance, was the L&MR Lion of 1838. This survived by spending many years as a stationary pump in Liverpool docks. It was re-boilered around 1880 with what was then a typical contemporary design, a round-topped boiler with raised firebox. When restored for historical display at the L&MR centenary of 1930, this was then hidden beneath a purely decorative brass facsimile of the original haycock boiler. This simplified round-topped firebox within an external brass pyramid was reproduced in LBSC's 1953 5" gauge model engineering design Titfield Thunderbolt.

== Other makers of haystack fireboxes ==
Some makers retained the Bury pattern of a hemispherical firebox. The American-built 4-2-0 Norris locomotives for the Birmingham and Gloucester Railway resembled a Bury design with outside cylinders, and retained the small D-shaped inner firebox. Kitson also built a number of long-boiler 0-6-0s around 1845, also using the hemispherical haystack firebox.

== Coppernob ==
Bury also built Furness Railway Nº 3 of 1846, one of the few surviving locomotives of this style and period. This locomotive acquired the name "Old Coppernob" or "Coppernob", on account of its polished copper outer cladding, which it then gave generically to this style of boiler.

== Decline ==
By around 1850 the haystack and Gothic boiler had fallen from favour. Boiler working pressures had risen from 80 to 120 psi (550 to 830 kPa) as with the Jenny Lind locomotives, making the flat surfaces of the Gothic firebox unsupportable. Future locomotives returned to the use of the steam dome.
