= James Kennedy (engineer) =

Scottish locomotive and marine engineer

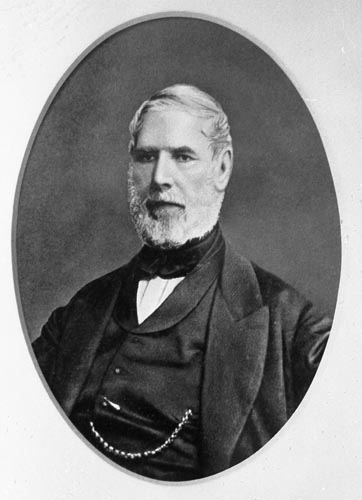
- Born: 13 January 1797; Gilmerton, Edinburgh, Scotland
- Died: 25 September 1886 (aged 89); Garston, Liverpool, England
- Citizenship: British
- Engineering career
- Discipline: Mechanical engineering

James Kennedy (13 January 1797 – 25 September 1886) was a Scottish locomotive and marine engineer. He was born in the village of Gilmerton near Edinburgh, Scotland.

== Career ==
=== Early years ===
He was apprenticed at the age of 13 to a millwright near Dalkeith, where he remained for five years. He spent some years working as a millwright, working with winding and pumping engines at several places before moving to Laverock Hall (now Larkhall) near Hamilton, where he was employed to erect pumping and winding engines of his own design.

=== Robert Stephenson and Company ===
In Liverpool to supervise the installation of a marine engine, he met George Stephenson, who was then establishing his locomotive works, Robert Stephenson and Company, at Newcastle-upon-Tyne. Stephenson appointed Kennedy manager in 1824. While in this post, Kennedy constructed two pairs of stationary winding engines and planned the first three locomotives for the opening of the Stockton and Darlington Railway in 1825.

=== Bury, Curtis and Kennedy ===
In 1825 he left Stephenson to return to Liverpool as manager of Mather, Dixon and Company but very soon joined locomotive builder Edward Bury and Company as foreman of the Clarence Foundry. In 1842 he became a partner in the firm, now renamed Bury, Curtis and Kennedy.

=== Thomas Vernon and Son ===
From 1844 he also acted as manager of the Liverpool shipbuilder Thomas Vernon and Son where he introduced iron deck beams.

== Professional appointments ==
He was a founder member of the Institution of Mechanical Engineers in 1847, becoming its President in 1860.

== Death ==
He died in 1886 at his home, Cressington Park, Garston, near Liverpool. He was survived by his wife, Adelaide.

Professional and academic associations
Preceded by John Penn	President of the Institution of Mechanical Engineers; 1860	Succeeded by William George Armstrong
