= Bury Bar Frame locomotive =

Pioneering British locomotive type from 1830s

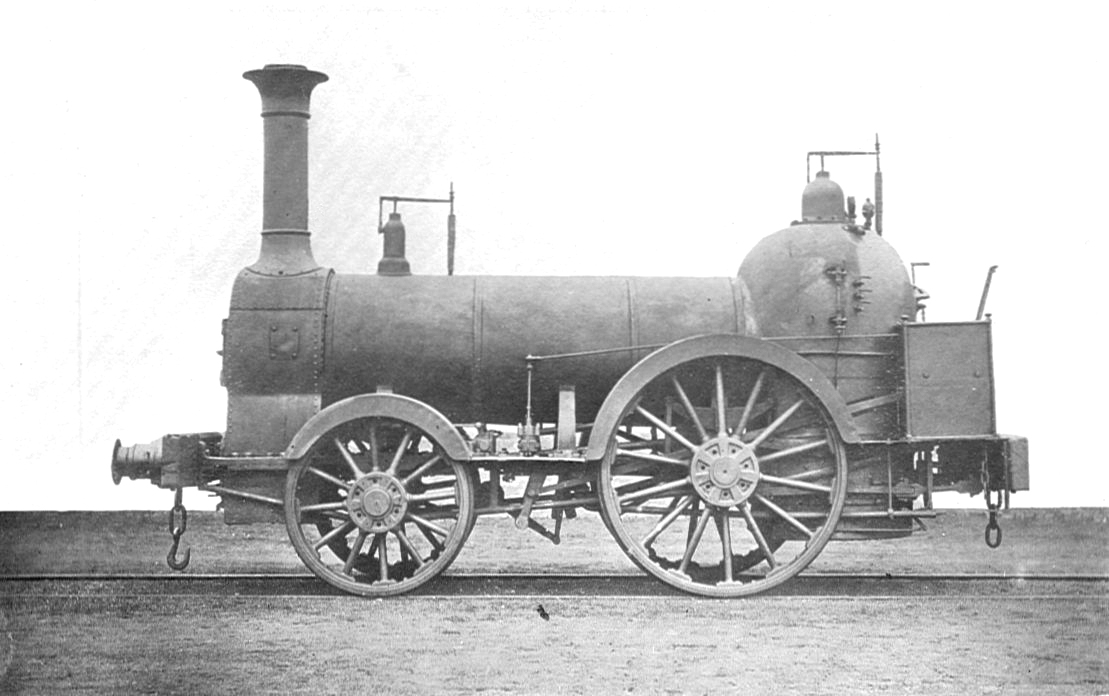
Bury 2-2-0 for the London and Birmingham Railway, 1846

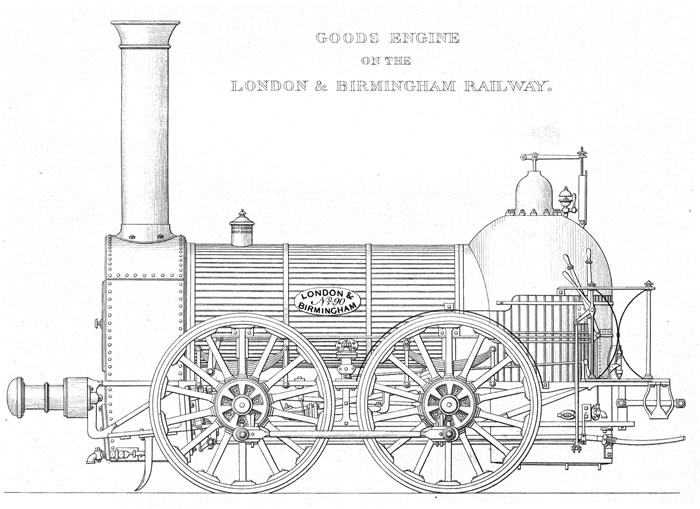
Bury 0-4-0 for the London and Birmingham Railway, 1838

The Bury Bar Frame locomotive was an early type of steam locomotive, developed at the Liverpool works of Edward Bury and Company, later named Bury, Curtis, and Kennedy in 1842. By the 1830s, the railway locomotive had evolved into three basic types - those developed by Robert Stephenson, Timothy Hackworth and Edward Bury.

== History ==
Edward Bury set himself up as an iron founder in Liverpool in the 1820s and manufactured various metal goods including marine steam engines as well as railway locomotives. Bury's first locomotive was the 1830 Dreadnought, an 0-6-0 which was targeted at the 1829 Rainhill Trials, but construction was completed too late. The basis of the Bury Bar Frame locomotive type emerged in 1830 as Bury's second locomotive 0-4-0 Liverpool, and while it had some issues it also had advantages compared to contemporary Stephenson locomotives. It is understood that most of the engineering was done by Bury's partner Kennedy, with Bury focusing more on the business side.

Bury was unable to make inroads into George Stephenson's supply of locomotives to the Liverpool and Manchester Railway, managing to supply only one, No. 28 Liver. On other railways the Bury Bar Frame become noted for workmanship, economy, and reliability with Bury becoming Stephenson's major competitor. In the 1830s Bury exported 28 engines to the United States, only slightly less than Stephenson's 35.

The London and Birmingham Railway (L&BR) directors wished to avoid giving a monopoly on locomotive supply to the Stephensons, and this actually resulted in Bury being appointed as locomotive superintendent and supplier to the L&BR railway with 110 of 180 being supplied by Bury, the remaining 70 by other contractors, though all were of the Bury Bar Type.

Other railways beside the L&BR adopted one or both of the Bury Bar Frame standard types of 0-4-0 for goods locomotives and 2-2-0 for passengers. These included the Eastern Counties Railway, Manchester, Bolton and Bury Railway, Midland Counties Railway, Lancaster and Preston Junction Railway, and North Union Railway.

In England, distances were shorter and traffic density was rising, so the trackwork was gradually improving. During the 1840s Stephenson had increased the power in his long boiler locomotive, while in 1847 David Joy introduced the Jenny Lind design.

Bury kept to using the four wheel arrangements but developments by other manufacturers forced the firm to supply six wheel designs of 2-2-2, 2-4-0, and 4-2-0 from 1847 until the firm's demise in 1851, with 415 locomotives having been built altogether.

=== Overseas ===
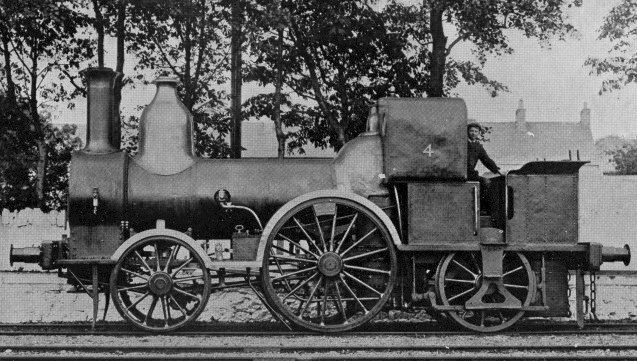
Bury 1837 2-2-0 for L&BR rebuilt 1847 as 2-2-2T and subsequently used on the Waterford and Tramore Railway from c. 1854 until 1905.

==== United States ====
The 0-4-0 locomotive Liverpool, which did poorly in England, was heavily rebuilt and sold to the Petersburg Railroad in 1832. The rebuild, which converted the locomotive to 5 ft (1,524 mm) gauge with 9 by 18 inches (230 mm × 460 mm) cylinders and smaller 4 feet 6 inches (1.37 m) wheels, began operation on the Petersburg Railroad on 13 April 1833, and proved sufficiently successful to result in further orders from Bury.

Bury Bar Frame four wheelers proved more suited to the lightweight track and wood fuel used in America. The use of the bar-frame and D-plan dome topped firebox became the classic American design of the nineteenth century, being adopted by the major manufacturers Baldwin, Norris, and Rogers.

==== France ====
Four locomotives were supplied to the Chemin de Fer de Paris à St. Germaine which opened in 1837.

==== Ireland ====
Twenty locomotives for the Great Southern and Western Railway of Ireland, one of which, No. 36, is preserved, were the last to use the cylindrical firebox.

== Characteristics ==
Notable features were forged-iron bar frames, a spherical topped outer firebox with internal copper firebox of semi-circular section and near-horizontal inside cylinders driving the cranked axles.

=== Frames ===
A major problem was the effect of their weight on the track of the time. Engines were increasing in size as more power was needed. Robert Stephenson had developed the Patentee with an extra pair of wheels to distribute the weight. However, this brought problems in that the extra length affected road-holding on curves. Such locomotives used a heavy, rigid frame of timber sandwiched between iron plates outside the wheels, plus internal iron sub-frames. Bury adopted a different approach by keeping to two axles and fabricating a bar frame inside the wheels, consisting (on each side) of two wrought-iron bars, a rectangular-section bar above the axle bearings and a round-section bar below.

From 1845 Bury built much bigger six-wheeled locomotives with bar frames; one of these, a 2-2-2 of 1847, was preserved and may be seen in Cork railway station.

=== Boilers ===
Bury engines were also notable for their round topped "haystack" fireboxes from 1830 until mid-1847; thereafter Bury, Curtis & Kennedy's engines were fitted with a raised but straight-topped firebox. The boiler pressure was gradually increased from 50 psi in the 1830s to a maximum of 85 psi by about 1850.

== Advantages and disadvantages ==
While Bury's four-wheeled engines were criticised for their alleged lack of strength and power they were in practice fast, reliable, low maintenance, and performed well on the typical 50-ton trains of the 1830s. In general they were superior to the type Stephenson six-wheelers of the same period that despite appearances had smaller boilers, poor weight distribution, and shorter working life. The design was emulated by a number of manufacturers, and they lasted on the London and North Western Railway until the 1860s and on other lines until much later. Their main problem (as with other inside-cylinder locomotives) was the breakage of the crank axle, but this was a rare occurrence with Bury's engines.
