= Furness Railway K1 Class =

Class of 4 British 4-4-0 locomotives

Furness Railway 120 class
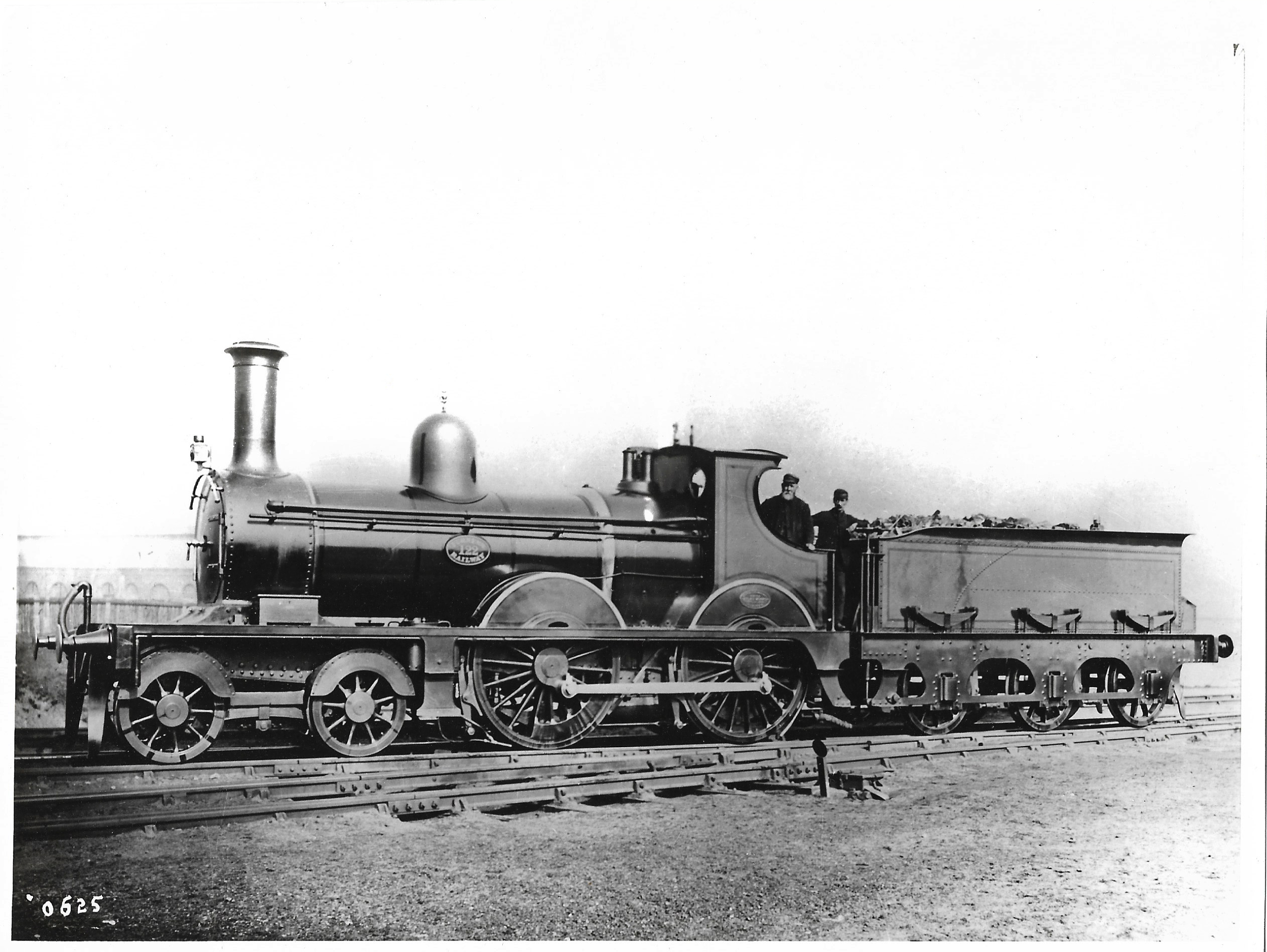
Type and origin
- Power type: Steam
- Designer: W. F. Pettigrew
- Builder: Sharp, Stewart and Company
- Serial number: 3618–3621
- Build date: 1890
- Total produced: 4
Specifications
- Configuration
  - Whyte: 4-4-0
  - UIC: 2′B n2S
- Gauge: 4 ft 8 1/2 in (1,435 mm)
- Driver dia.: 5 ft 7 1/2 in (1.715 m)
- Loco weight: 36 long tons 2 cwt (80,900 lb or 36.7 t)
- Fuel capacity: Coal
- Boiler pressure: 140 lbf/in^{2} (965 kPa)
- Cylinders: Two
- Cylinder size: 17 in × 24 in (432 mm × 610 mm)
- Valve gear: Stephenson
Performance figures
- Tractive effort: 12,228 lbf (54.39 kN)
Career
- Operators: FR » LMS
- Class: 120 ("K1")
- Numbers: FR: 120–123; LMS: 10131–10134
- Nicknames: Seagulls
- Withdrawn: 1924–1927
- Disposition: All scrapped

The Furness Railway 120 class (classified K1 by Bob Rush) or "Seagulls", were a class of four 4-4-0 steam locomotives designed by W. F. Pettigrew and built by Sharp, Stewart and Company of Glasgow for the Furness Railway in 1890.

== Transfer to LMS ==
They all passed to the London, Midland and Scottish Railway at the 1923 grouping.

== Disposal ==
They were withdrawn between 1924 and 1927.

Table of withdrawals
Year	Quantity in service at start of year	Quantity withdrawn	Locomotive numbers	Notes
1924	4	1	10132	
1925	3	1	10134	
1927	2	2	10131/33	

== See also ==
- Locomotives of the Furness Railway
