= Furness Railway 115 class =

Class of 5 British 4-6-4T locomotives

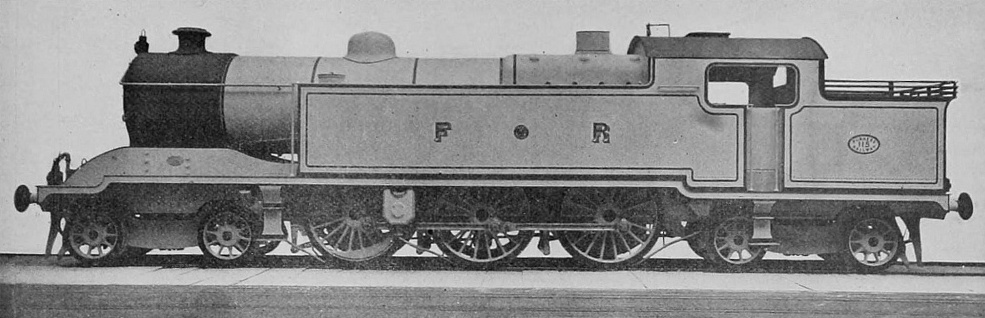
- FR 115 class
Type and origin
- Power type: Steam
- Designer: David Rutherford
- Builder: Kitson and Company
- Serial number: 5292–5296
- Build date: 1920-1921
- Total produced: 5
Specifications
- Configuration
  - Whyte: 4-6-4T
  - UIC: 2′C2′ n2t
- Gauge: 4 ft 8 1/2 in (1,435 mm)
- Driver dia.: 5 ft 8 in (1.727 m)
- Trailing dia.: 3 ft 2 in (0.965 m)
- Wheelbase: 40 ft 9 in (12.421 m)
- Height: 13 ft 6 in (4.115 m)
- Loco weight: 92.75 long tons (94.24 t)
- Fuel type: Coal
- Water cap.: 2,800 imp gal (13,000 L; 3,400 US gal)
- Boiler pressure: 170 psi (1.17 MPa)
- Cylinders: Two, inside
- Cylinder size: 19 1/2 in × 26 in (495 mm × 660 mm)
- Valve gear: Stephenson
Performance figures
- Tractive effort: 21,006 lbf (93.44 kN)
Career
- Operators: Furness Railway; → London, Midland and Scottish Railway
- Class: FR: 115
- Power class: LMS: 3P
- Numbers: FR: 115-119; LMS: 11100–11104
- Withdrawn: 1934–1935, 1940
- Disposition: All scrapped

The Furness Railway 115 class (unofficially classified N1 by Bob Rush), was a class of five 4-6-4 (or Baltic) tank locomotives of the Furness Railway. They were designed by David Rutherford and built by Kitson and Company in 1920–1921. They were nicknamed "Jumbos" and the author Bob Rush gave them the unofficial classification N1. Their main duty was to haul express passenger trains between Carnforth and Whitehaven.

They were the only Baltic tank locomotives in Britain with inside cylinders, and one of two to lack a superheater.

== LMS ownership ==
All five passed to the London, Midland and Scottish Railway at the Grouping in 1923. The LMS gave them the classification 3P. All but one were withdrawn between 1934 and 1935, with the final member being withdrawn and scrapped in 1940.

== Numbering ==
Table of locomotives
Date new	FR number	LMS number	Date Withdrawn
1920	115	11100	July 1935
1920	116	11101	July 1935
1920	117	11102	November 1934
1920	118	11103	1940
1921	119	11104	May 1935

== See also ==
- Locomotives of the Furness Railway
