= List of locomotive builders =

This list of locomotive builders (companies, government agencies and railways) is ordered by country and includes both modern-day and defunct builders. Since many entities changed their names over time, the most recognisable name is used – generally the one used for the longest time or during the entity's best-known period.

Note: Two factors affect this list's reliability: the preponderance of unreferenced entries and the inconsistency in frequency and coverage of updates.

Africa	South Africa
Asia	Azerbaijan, China, Georgia, India, Indonesia, Iran, Japan, South Korea, North Korea, Malaysia, Pakistan, Philippines, Taiwan, Turkey
Europe	Belgium, Croatia, Czech Republic, Denmark, Finland, France, Germany, Greece, Hungary, Italy, Latvia, Netherlands, Poland, Portugal, Romania, Russia, Serbia, Slovakia, Spain, Sweden, Switzerland, Ukraine, United Kingdom
North America	Canada, United States
Oceania	Australia, New Zealand
South America	Argentina, Brazil, Chile
See also

== Argentina ==
=== Active companies ===
- Grupo Emepa
- Material Ferroviario

=== Defunct companies ===
- Astarsa
- Fábrica Argentina de Locomotoras
- GAIA

== Australia ==
Australia's mainline railways, owned by the governments of the six British colonies, imported locomotives from the United Kingdom and United States. Domestic production, by companies and railways alike, began about 1890, though locomotives continued to be imported after that.

=== Active companies ===
- Alstom, Dandenong
- Downer Rail, Cardiff, Maryborough & Newport
- UGL Rail, Broadmeadow formerly United Group Rail, United Goninan and A Goninan
- Alstom, Ballarat, Newport, Epping, North Ryde, Perth, Brisbane

=== Defunct companies ===
- AE Goodwin, Granville
- Avteq, Sunshine
- Cardiff Locomotive Workshops
- Chullora Railway Workshops
- Clyde Engineering, Granville, Kelso, Somerton, Eagle Farm, Rosewater & Forrestfield, taken over by Evans Deakin Industries July 1996, became part of Downer Rail in March 2001
- Comeng, Clyde, Dandenong & Bassendean
- EM Baldwin, Castle Hill (not the American company) - built mainly small sugar cane and mining tram engines
- English Electric Australia, Rocklea
- Evans, Anderson, Phelan & Co, Kangaroo Point
- Eveleigh Railway Workshops, Redfern
- Islington Railway Workshops
- James Martin & Company, Gawler
- Martin & King, Somerton
- Midland Railway Workshops, Perth
- Mine Technic Australia
- Morrison-Knudsen Australia
- National Railway Equipment Company, Islington
- North Ipswich Railway Workshops
- Perry Engineering, Mile End
- Phoenix Engine Company, Ipswich
- Springall & Frost, Ipswich
- Tulloch Limited, Rhodes
- Walkers Limited, Maryborough

== Azerbaijan ==
- Baku Carriage Repair Factory
- Baku Metro
- STP-Wagon-Building Factory

== Belgium ==
=== Active companies ===
- Alstom Charleroi – formerly ACEC Transport
- Bombardier Transportation Brugge – formerly BN-Eurorail, formerly La Brugeoise et Nivelles
- John Cockerill - former CMI

=== Defunct companies ===
- Ateliers de Tubize
- Ateliers de la Meuse
- Société Anglo-Franco-Belge
- Société de Saint-Léonard

== Brazil ==
- Companhia Brasileira de Materiais Ferroviários
- Mafersa
- EIF
- EMD (Progress Rail/ Caterpillar)
- Wabtec (formerly GE Transportation)

== Bulgaria ==
- Express Service

== Canada ==
=== Active companies ===
- Bombardier Transportation – Berlin-based division of Alstom (no locomotives produced in Canada)
- Cando Rail & Terminals – Brandon, Manitoba
- Railpower Technologies – Vancouver, British Columbia – subsidiary of R.J. Corman Railroad Group since 2009

=== Defunct companies ===
- Canadian Locomotive Company – Kingston, Ontario – Fairbanks-Morse (Canada) Ltd 1965 and ceased operations 1969
- General Motors Diesel Division – London, Ontario – later as Electro-Motive Diesel Canadian operations and ceased production by Progress Rail in 2012
- Montreal Locomotive Works – Montreal, Quebec – formerly part of American Locomotive Company, acquired by Bombardier Inc in 1975 but ended locomotive production 1985
- Urban Transportation Development Corporation – Toronto, Ontario – former Crown corporation

== Chile ==
- Casagrande Motori

== China ==
=== Active companies ===
- CRRC

=== Defunct companies ===
- China CNR - merged into CRRC
- CSR Corporation - merged into CRRC

== Croatia ==
- Končar

== Czech Republic ==
- ČKD (Českomoravská Kolben-Daněk)
- CZ LOKO
- Škoda Transportation
- Škoda Works

== Denmark ==
- ABB
- Frichs
- Pedershaab
- Triangel

== Finland ==
- Lokomo
- Rautaruukki Oyj
- Saalasti Oy
- Škoda Transtech
- Tampella
- Valmet
- Valtionrautatiet (Finnish State Railways)

== France ==
=== Commercial manufacturers ===
- Alcard, Buddicom et Cie.
- Alsthom (now Alstom)
- Anciens Établissements Cail – 1883–1898, became SFCM
- André Koechlin et Cie. – to SACM in 1872
- Ateliers du Nord de la France (ANF) – also known as Blanc-Misseron; acquired by Bombardier Transportation in 1989
- Brissonneau & Lotz – acquired by Alstom in 1972
- Buffault et Robatel
- Charbonniers et Cie
- CFD
- Compagnie des forges et aciéries de la marine et d'Homécourt
- Compagnie Electro-Méchanique – acquired by Alstom in 1985
- Compagnie générale de construction de locomotives – Batignolles-Châtillon, Nantes, founded 1917
- Corpet-Louvet – 1889–1952
- Etablissment Cavé – to Charbonniers et Cie. in 1854
- Etablissment Claprède
- Fives-Lille – merged into Fives-Lille Cail in 1958
- Schneider-Creusot – now Schneider Electric
- Société Alsacienne de Constructions Mécaniques (SACM)
- Société Ch. Derosne et Cail – 1836–1848, became Société J. F. Cail & Cie.
- Société de Construction des Batignolles, Paris – founded 1871, ceased locomotive production 1928, merged into Spie Batignolles in 1968
- Société française de constructions mécaniques (SFCM) – created in 1898, merged into Fives-Lille Cail in 1958
- Société Franco-Belge
- Société J. F. Cail & Cie – 1850–1883, became Anciens Établissements Cail
- Société Nouvelle des Forges et Chantiers de la Méditerranée

=== Railway company workshops ===
- Arles (1899–1904) – PLM
- La Chapelle, Paris – Chemins de Fer du Nord
- Épernay (1854–1970) – Chemins de fer de l'Est
- Hellennes, Lille – Chemins de Fer du Nord
- Ivry – PLM
- Nîmes (1856–1858) – Chemin de fer de Lyon à la Méditerranée, later Chemins de fer de Paris à Lyon et à la Méditerranée (PLM)
- Ouillins (1863–1914) – PLM
- Paris (1909–1920) – PLM
- Sotteville, Rouen – Chemins de fer de l'Ouest from 1909)
- Vilnius locomotive repair depot

== Georgia ==
- Elmavalmshenebeli (TEVZ)

== Germany ==
=== Active companies ===
- Bombardier Transportation
- Fahrzeugtechnik Dessau
- Interlock steam
- Robel Bahnbaumaschinen
- Schalker Eisenhütte Maschinenfabrik
- Schöma
- Siemens Mobility
- Voith
- Vossloh
- Windhoff

=== Defunct companies ===
- Adtranz – now part of Bombardier
- AEG – now part of Bombardier
- AG Vulcan Stettin
- Berliner Maschinenbau
- Gmeinder
- Hanomag
- Henschel - acquired by Adtranz
- Hohenzollern Locomotive Works
- KraussMaffei
- Krupp
- LEW Hennigsdorf – formerly Borsig Lokomotiv Werke, formerly AEG, now part of Bombardier
- Maschinenbau Kiel (MaK) - acquired by Siemens, now part of Vossloh
- Maschinenfabrik Esslingen
- Maschinenfabrik L. Schwartzkopff
- Orenstein & Koppel
- Schichau-Werke
- Waggonfabrik Talbot - now part of Bombardier
- Grafenstaden

== Greece ==
- Basileiades
- Skaramagas Hellenic Shipyards Co.
- Eleuisis Shipyards
- Siemens Hellas
- Kioleidis

== Hungary ==
- Ganz
- MÁVAG

== India ==
=== Active companies ===
- Chittaranjan Locomotive Works
- Banaras Locomotive Works
- Patiala Locomotive Works
- Electric Locomotive Factory, Madhepura
- Diesel Locomotive Factory, Marhowrah
- Rolling Stock Workshop, Dahod
- Central Railway Locomotive Workshop, Parel
- Eastern Railway Locomotive Workshop, Jamalpur
- Golden Rock Railway Workshop
- Electric Loco Assembly & Ancillary Unit (ELAAU), Dankuni
- Bharat Heavy Electricals Limited
- Bharat Earth Movers Limited
- Integral Coach Factory, Chennai
- Rail Coach Factory, Kapurthala
- Modern Coach Factory, Raebareli
- Titagarh Rail Systems
- Medha Servo Drives
- Kinet Railway Solutions
- SAN Engineering & Locomotive Company
- Ovis Equipments Private Limited
- Phooltas Transrail Limited

=== Defunct companies ===
- TATA Engineering and Locomotive Company (TELCO)
- Jessop & Company

== Indonesia ==
- Industri Kereta Api

== Iran ==
- Mapna Locomotive Engineering and Manufacturing Company
- Wagon Pars

== Italy ==
=== Active companies ===
- Alstom Ferroviaria S.p.A. – Savigliano
- Bombardier Transportation Italy – Vado Ligure
- Hitachi Rail Italy (formerly Ansaldo Breda)
- Firema Trasporti
- Ipe
- Valente

=== Defunct companies ===
- Fiat Ferroviaria
- Officine Casaralta
- Società Italiana Ernesto Breda - Later Breda Costruzioni Ferroviarie, merged with Ansaldo as AnsaldoBreda, now Hitachi Rail Italy
- Gio. Ansaldo & C. - Merged into AnsaldoBreda, now Hitachi Rail Italy

== Japan ==
- Hitachi
- Kawasaki Railcar Manufacturing
- Mitsubishi Heavy Industries
- Toshiba
- Nippon Sharyo
- J-TREC (former Tokyu Car Co.)
- Kinki Sharyo
- Alna Sharyo
- Niigata Transys
- Kokura
- Kisha Seizō

== Latvia ==
=== Defunct Companies ===
- Rīgas Vagonbūves Rūpnīca

== Malaysia ==
- SMH Rail Sdn Bhd

== Netherlands ==
=== Active companies ===
- Bemo Rail, Warmenhuizen

=== Defunct companies ===
- Allan
- N.V. Heemaf
- Spoorijzer
- Werkspoor

== New Zealand ==
=== Active companies ===
- A&G Price

=== Defunct companies ===
- Dispatch & Garlick
- EW Mills
- Gibbons & Harris
- OW Smith
- Scott Engineering
- Union Foundry
- Du Croo & Brauns

== North Korea ==
- Kim Chong-t'ae Electric Locomotive Works

== Pakistan ==
- Pakistan Locomotive Factory

== Philippines ==
=== Defunct companies ===
- Manila Railroad Company's Caloocan Works — The Manila Railroad once made its own railmotors at the Caloocan yards from 1924 to 1949. It also assembled two 630 class 2-8-2 locomotives with parts acquired from the War Assets Administration in 1948.
- Ramcar, Inc. — Also constructed and assembled railmotors alongside the MRR. Although it still survives as the Ramcar Group of Companies, its rolling stock business ended during World War II.

== Poland ==
=== Active companies ===
- Bombardier Transportation
- Bumar
- Fablok
- H. Cegielski (Poznań)
- Newag
- Pesa

=== Defunct companies ===
- Pafawag – now part of Bombardier

== Portugal ==
- Sorefame - acquired by ABB, then ADtranz, now part of Bombardier

== Romania ==
- Electroputere – Craiova RELOC | Passion for locomotives
- FAUR – Bucharest
- Promat – Craiova
- Softronic – Craiova
- UCM Reşiţa – Reşiţa
- Romania Euroest S.A. – Constanța

== Russia ==
=== Active Companies ===
- Kambarka Engineering Works
- Kirov Plant
- Muromteplovoz
- Sinara Group
  - Kalugaputmash
  - Lyudinovsky Locomotive Plant
  - Ural Locomotives
- Transmashholding
  - Bryansk Machine-Building Plant
  - Demikhovo Machinebuilding Plant
  - Kolomna Locomotive Works
  - Metrowagonmash
  - Novocherkassk Electric Locomotive Factory (NEVZ)

=== Defunct Companies ===
- Torzhok Carriage Works
- Vagonmash

== Serbia ==
- Goša FOM
- Mašinska Industrija Niš (MIN)

== Slovakia ==
- Avokov
- ZOŠ - Vrútky

== South Africa ==
- DCD Group
- Girdlestone Steam
- Transnet Engineering
- Union Carriage & Wagon
- Grindrod Locomotives
- Prof Pty Ltd Engineers
- Trident South Africa
- Prof Pty Ltd Engineers

== South Korea ==
- Hyundai Rotem
- Woojin Industrial Systems

== Spain ==
=== Active companies ===
- CAF
- Stadler Rail
- Talgo

=== Defunct companies ===
- ATEINSA. Became part of the GEC-Alstom group (now Alstom) in 1989.
- Babcock & Wilcox
- Euskalduna
- La Maquinista Terrestre y Marítima (MTM). Became part of the GEC-Alstom group (now Alstom) in 1989.
- MACOSA. Became part of the GEC-Alstom group (now Alstom) in 1989, until 2005 when it became part of the Vossloh group. The plant was sold to Stadler in 2015.

== Sweden ==
- ASEA – later ABB, later Adtranz; rail business sold to Bombardier in 2001
- Helsingborgs Mekaniska Verkstad
- Ljunggrens Verkstad
- Munktells Mekaniska Verkstad
- NOHAB

== Switzerland ==
- DLM AG, Dampflokomotiv- und Maschinenfabrik AG
- Ferdinand Steck Maschinenfabrik
- Stadler Rail

=== Defunct companies ===
- Brown, Boveri & Cie – later ABB, later Adtranz; rail business sold to Bombardier in 2001
- SIG (1853–1995)
- Swiss Locomotive & Machine Works (SLM) – closed in 2001, parts taken over by Stadler Rail, DLM and Prose

== Taiwan ==
- Taiwan Rolling Stock Company

=== Defunct companies ===
- Tang Eng Iron Works (Manufacturing of rolling stock has been ceased and transferred to Taiwan Rolling Stock Co.)

== Turkey ==
- EUROTEM
- TÜRASAŞ

=== Defunct companies ===
- TÜVASAŞ
- TÜLOMSAŞ
- TÜDEMSAŞ

== Ukraine ==
- Kryukiv Railway Car Building Works
- Luhanskteplovoz
- Kharkiv Locomotive Factory (KhPZ)

== United Kingdom ==
Historically, major railways in the United Kingdom built the vast majority of their locomotives. Commercial locomotive builders were called upon when requirements exceeded the railway works' capacity, but these orders were generally to the railways' own designs. British commercial builders concentrated on industrial users, small railway systems, and to a large extent the export market. British-built locomotives were exported around the world, especially to the British Empire. With the almost total disappearance of British industrial railways, the shrinking of the export market and much reduced demand from Britain's railways, few British locomotive builders survive.

=== Active companies ===
- Alan Keef – narrow-gauge diesel/steam locomotives, permanent way
- Bombardier Transportation – electric multiple units, diesel multiple units; Derby
- Brush-Barclay – Kilmarnock; part of Wabtec
- Brush Traction – diesel and electric locomotives; Loughborough; part of Wabtec
- Clayton Equipment Company – diesel/electric/battery locomotives
- Cowans Sheldon – railway cranes
- Exmoor Steam Railway – narrow-gauge steam locomotives
- Ffestiniog Railway – narrow-gauge steam locomotives and carriages
- Hitachi Rail – diesel and electric locomotives, carriages
- Hunslet Engine Company – diesel locomotives, narrow-gauge steam locomotives; part of Wabtec
- Rhino Industries – narrow-gauge diesel/steam locomotives, new build, maintenance
- Severn Lamb – narrow gauge diesel/steam/steam outline locomotives, carriages, and track infrastructure
- Steam Loco Design
- TMA Engineering – narrow-gauge diesel locomotives
- Ravenglass & Eskdale - has made own locomotive, see this page

=== Defunct companies ===
- 5AT project – steam for the 21st century
- Andrew Barclay Sons & Company
- Armstrong Whitworth
- Aveling & Porter
- Avonside Engine Company
- Baguley Cars - acquired by Drewry Car Company in 1962
- William Beardmore & Company
- Beyer, Peacock & Company
- Birmingham Railway Carriage & Wagon Company
- Black, Hawthorn & Company
- British Rail Engineering Limited
- British Electric Vehicles
- British Thomson-Houston
- Cravens – multiple units/coaching stock
- D Wickham & Company
- Davies & Metcalfe
- De Winton
- Drewry Car Company
- Dübs & Company – to North British Locomotive Company in 1903
- English Electric
- FC Hibberd & Company
- Fletcher Jennings
- Fox, Walker & Company – became Peckett & Sons in 1880
- George England & Company
- Gloucester Railway Carriage & Wagon Company – multiple units/coaching stock
- Grant, Ritchie & Company
- Greenwood & Batley
- Hawthorn Leslie & Company – locomotive business sold to Robert Stephenson & Hawthorns in 1937
- Hudswell Clarke
- John Fowler & Company
- Kerr, Stuart & Company
- Kitson & Company
- Manning Wardle
- Metro-Cammell (multiple units/coaching stock)
- Metropolitan-Vickers
- Midland Railway Carriage & Wagon Company
- Motor Rail
- Muir-Hill
- Nasmyth, Gaskell & Company
- Neilson & Company – became Neilson Reid & Company in 1898; to North British Locomotive Company in 1903
- North British Locomotive Company
- Peckett & Sons
- Pressed Steel Company – multiple units/coaching stock
- R&W Hawthorn – to 1870
- Ruston & Hornsby
- Sentinel Waggon Works
- Robert Stephenson & Company – became Robert Stephenson & Hawthorns in 1937
- Robert Stephenson & Hawthorns
- Sharp, Roberts & Company – became Sharp Brothers & Company in 1843; Sharp, Stewart & Company in 1852; to North British Locomotive Company in 1903
- Stephen Lewin
- Thomas Hill
- Tulk and Ley
- Vulcan Foundry
- WG Bagnall
- Walker Brothers
- Wingrove & Rogers
- Yorkshire Engine Company

See also:

- List of British railway-owned locomotive builders
- List of early British private locomotive manufacturers

== United States ==
=== Active companies ===
- Brookville Equipment Corporation
- Process Locomotives
- Colmar
- Electro-Motive Diesel
- GE Transportation
- Harsco Corporation
- Katiland Trains
- Kloke Locomotive Works
- Knoxville Locomotive Works
- Merrick Light Railway
- Motive Power & Equipment Solutions - No Longer in service.
- National Railway Equipment Company
- NS Juniata Locomotive Shop (Thoroughbred Mechanical Services)
- Progress Rail
- Quality Rail Service Corporation
- Railserve Leaf
- RELCO Locomotives
- Republic Transportation Systems
- Siemens Mobility
- Train Rides Unlimited
- Tweetsie Railroad – official source for Crown Metal Products parts
- Wabtec – Amusement Rides Manufacturer specializing in Locomotives, Carousels, and Railroad Installation
- Wiese

=== Defunct companies ===
In addition to these, many railroads operating steam locomotives built locomotives in their shops. Notable examples include the Baltimore and Ohio Railroad's Mount Clare Shops, Norfolk & Western's Roanoke Shops, Pennsylvania Railroad's Altoona Works and the Southern Pacific's Sacramento Shops. An estimate of total steam locomotive production in the United States is about 175,000 engines, including nearly 70,000 by Baldwin.

- Altoona Machine Shops (PRR)
- American Locomotive Company (ALCO)
- Amoskeag Locomotive Works
- Appomattox Locomotive Works – operated by Uriah Wells
- Atlas Car & Manufacturing Company
- Baldwin Locomotive Works – later known as Baldwin-Lima-Hamilton
- Bell Locomotive Works – New York City and Bloomsburg, Pennsylvania
- Brooks Locomotive Works - to ALCO in 1901
- Budd Company
- Burr & Ettinger
- Miniature Railway Company – also known as Cagney Bros.
- Cincinnati Locomotive Works – also known as Harkness and as Moore & Richardson
- Climax Manufacturing Company
- Cooke Locomotive & Machine Works - began as Danforth Locomotive & Machine Company, later Danforth, Cooke, & Company, to ALCO in 1901
- Covington Locomotive Works
- Crown Metal Products
- Custom Fabricators
- Davenport Locomotive Works
- Denmead
- Dickson Manufacturing Company – to ALCO in 1901
- Dunkirk Engineering Company
- Eastwick & Harrison
- Euclid Road Machinery Company
- Fairbanks-Morse
- Globe Locomotive Works
- Glover Locomotive Works
- Grant Locomotive Works
- HK Porter – Smith & Porter, later Porter, Bell & Co.
- Heisler Locomotive Works
- Hicks Locomotive and Car Works
- Hinkley Locomotive Works
- Hurlbut Amusement Company
- Ingalls Shipbuilding
- Kentucky Locomotive Works
- Lancaster Locomotive Works
- Lawrence Machine Shop
- Lima Locomotive Works – later Lima-Hamilton, then Baldwin-Lima-Hamilton
- Locks and Canals Machine Shop
- Lowell Machine Shop
- Manchester Locomotive Works - to ALCO in 1901
- Mason Machine Works
- McQueen Locomotive Works
- Milwaukee Locomotive Manufacturing Company
- Mount Savage Locomotive Works
- Nashville Manufacturing Company
- New Castle Manufacturing Company
- New Jersey Locomotive & Machine Company – began as Swinburne, Smith & Company
- New York Locomotive Works – also known as Breese, Kneeland & Company
- Niles & Company
- Norris Locomotive Works
- Ottaway Amusement Company, founders of Joyland Amusement Park (Wichita, Kansas)
- Pittsburgh Locomotive & Car Works - to ALCO in 1901
- Plymouth Locomotive Works
- Portland Company
- Railpower Technologies
- Rhode Island Locomotive Works - to ALCO in 1901
- Richmond Locomotive Works - to ALCO in 1901
- Roanoke East End Shops
- Rogers Locomotive & Machine Works – began as Rogers, Ketchum & Grosvenor, to ALCO in 1905
- Rome Locomotive Works – New York
- Ross Winans Locomotive Works
- Schenectady Locomotive Works - later became American Locomotive Company (ALCO)
- St Louis Car Company
- Swinburne, Smith & Company
- Sygnet Rail Technologies
- T. H. Paul & Sons
- Talbott & Brother Iron Works
- Taunton Locomotive Manufacturing Company
- Tredegar Iron Works
- Union Iron Works
- United Aircraft
- Virginia Locomotive & Car Works – also known as Smith & Perkins
- Vulcan Iron Works
- Wasatch Railroad Contractors – builder of brand-new 15 in (381 mm) gauge Cagney replica steam locomotives
- West Point Foundry
- Westinghouse Electric Corporation
- Whitcomb Locomotive Works
- Ernst Wiener Co., New York
- Wilmarth

== See also ==
- List of rolling stock manufacturers
- List of tram builders
- List of railway companies
