= List of early British private locomotive manufacturers =

This is a list of early British private locomotive manufacturers in chronological order. Many listed manufacturers have changed their names, have been taken over or merged. Some began with other products, such as textile or mining machinery. Some later made only industrial or specialised locomotives, often for export.

1785 RB Longridge & Company Bedlington First loco built 1837. Closed 1855 after producing 206 locomotives.
1790 William & Alfred Kitching, Darlington First loco 1832. Bought by Stockton and Darlington Railway in 1862. Closed 1886.
1790 Benjamin Outram & Company, Butterley, Derbyshire Civil engineering firm, but had a strong interest in railways. Became Butterley Company in 1805
1795 Fenton, Murray & Wood, The Round Foundry Leeds, First loco 1812. Became Fenton, Murray & Jackson in 1826.
1805 Butterley Company, Butterley, Derbyshire Built locos for its own use plus two for the Midland Counties Railway. Closed in 1965, though the Butterley Engineering Company survives
1810 Haigh Foundry, Wigan First loco 1835. Closed 1856, after producing 103 locomotives.
1810 J and C Carmichael, Ward Foundry Dundee Two locos only in 1833. Became James Carmichael in 1853. Limited liability in 1894. Closed 1929.
1816 William Fairbairn & Sons Manchester First loco 1839. Loco business bought by Sharp Stewart in 1863.
1817 R & W Hawthorn, Newcastle Became Hawthorn Leslie in 1884.
1819 Foster, Rastrick and Company, Stourbridge, Four locomotives in 1829, including first in USA. Closed 1831.
1823 Robert Stephenson & Company Newcastle Became R.Stephenson & Hawthorn in 1937.
1823 Edward Bury & Company, Liverpool Became Bury, Curtis & Kennedy in 1842
1824 G and J Rennie, Blackfriars see George and John Rennie
1826 Fenton, Murray & Jackson, The Round Foundry Leeds Closed 1843. Fenton took over Shepherd and Todd's Railway Foundry in 1846.
1826 Mather, Dixon and Company, Liverpool Moved to Bootle in 1839. Closed 1843.
1828 Sharp, Roberts & Company, Manchester First loco 1833. Became Sharp Brothers and Company in 1843.
1828 Timothy Hackworth, Shildon First loco 1829.
1830 Rothwell, Hick and Rothwell, Bolton Became Rothwell and Company 1832
1830 Charles Tayleur and Company, (Vulcan Foundry) Warrington Became Vulcan Foundry in 1847
1830 Tulk and Ley, Whitehaven. Taken over by Fletcher Jennings Ltd. in 1857
1831 Crook and Dean, Little Bolton. Built locos for Bolton and Leigh Railway in 1831 including Salamander and Veteran
1832 Rothwell and Company, Bolton Closed approx 1864
1833 Benjamin Hick and Sons, Bolton Last locos 1850. Became Hick, Hargreaves and Company, acquiring limited liability in 1889.
1834 George Forrester and Company, Liverpool, Closed 1890. Last locomotive circa 1847.
1834 Day, Summers and Company, Southampton, First loco 1837, became Summers, Day and Baldock in 1847.
1834 John George Bodmer, Bolton, First loco 1842, last loco circa 1845.
1835 James Kitson, Airedale Foundry, Leeds, Became Todd, Kitson & Laird in 1838.
1835 John Coulthard & Son, Gateshead, Became R. Coulthard and Company in 1853.
1836 Nasmyth, Gaskell & Company, Patricroft Became James Nasmyth in 1850.
1837 Henry Stothert and Company, Bristol, Became Stothert, Slaughter and Company in 1841.
1837 Jones, Turner and Evans, Newton-le-Willows became Jones & Potts in 1844.
1837 Kerr, Mitchell & Neilson, Glasgow Became Kerr, Neilson and Company in 1840.
1837 Thomas Kirtley, & Co. Warrington Failed in 1841
1838 Shepherd and Todd, the Railway Foundry. Leeds, Became Fenton, Craven and Company in 1846.
1838 Todd, Kitson & Laird, Leeds Also known as Kitson and Laird, also Laird and Kitson. Became Kitson, Thompson and Hewitson in 1842.
1839 Fossick & Hackworth, Stockton-on-Tees
c1839 Thompson & Cole, Little Bolton Built five locos including two for the Birmingham and Derby Junction Railway.
c1839 Stark and Fulton, Glasgow Built locos between 1839 and 1849.
c1840 Isaac Dodds and Son, Rotherham, First locomotive 1849 though possible previous work for the Sheffield & Rotherham Railway. Closed 1868.
1840 Andrew Barclay Sons & Co Kilmarnock First steam loco 1859. Began building diesels in 1935. Merged with Hunslet Group 1972. Still in business as Hunslet-Barclay).
1840 Kerr, Neilson & Company, Glasgow, First locos 1843. Became Neilson and Mitchell in 1845.
1841 Stothert, Slaughter & Company, Bristol, Became Slaughter, Grüning & Company in 1856.
1842 Bury, Curtis & Kennedy, Liverpool Wound up 1851.
1842 Kitson, Thompson & Hewitson, Leeds Later Kitson and Hewitson, then Kitson & Company in 1863.
1843 W. B. Adams, Fairfield Works, Bow, Steam-powered carriage 1847. Locos from 1849. Adams radial axle box. Closed circa 1872.
1843 Sharp Brothers & Company, Manchester Became Sharp, Stewart & Company in 1852
1843 Gilkes Wilson Middlesbrough First locomotives built 1847. Became Hopkins Gilkes and Company in 1865
1844 Charles Todd, Leeds Closed 1858. Taken over by Carrett, Marshall and Company
1844 Jones and Potts, Newton-le-Willows Closed 1852. Jones then opened a company in Liverpool.
1845 Neilson & Mitchell, Glasgow, Became Neilson & Company in 1855
1846 Hawthorns & Company, Leith Set up by R & W Hawthorn to provide engines for Scotland. Closed circa 1872
1846 Fenton, Craven & Company, Leeds Became EB Wilson & Company in 1846
1846 EB Wilson & Company, Leeds Built Jenny Lind Closed 1858
1847 W. G. Armstrong and Company, Newcastle on Tyne Became Armstrong Whitworth in 1897.
1847 Vulcan Foundry, Warrington, Limited liability in 1864. In 1955 became part of English Electric. Last locomotive 1970. Works closed 2002
1847 Summers, Day and Baldock, Southampton No locomotives built after 1839. Later became Day, Summers and Company
1849 George England and Co., Hatcham Iron Works, New Cross
1850 John Fowler & Company, Leeds First locos 1866. Limited liability in 1886. Locomotive activities ended 1968
1850 James Nasmyth, Patricroft Became Patricroft Ironworks in 1857
1852 John Jones & Son, Liverpool Closed 1863
1853 Sharp, Stewart & Company, Manchester, later Glasgow, Limited liability in 1864. Took over Clyde Locomotive Company in 1888. Merged into North British Locomotive Company in 1903
1853 R Coulthard & Company Gateshead Closed 1865. Passed to Black, Hawthorn & Co
1854 Beyer, Peacock & Company, Gorton Foundry, Manchester, Limited liability 1902. Famous for Garratt locomotivess. Reorganised for diesel-hydraulic in 1961. Closed 1966
1854 Brassey & Company, Canada Works, Birkenhead Subsidiary of Brassey, Jackson, Betts and Company. Last loco circa 1875
1855 Neilson & Company, Glasgow, Became Neilson, Reid and Company in 1898
1856 Slaughter, Grüning & Company, Bristol Became Avonside Engine Company in 1866
1857 Patricroft Ironworks, Patricroft Became Nasmyth, Wilson & Company in 1867
1857 Ruston, Proctor & Company Lincoln Locomotives built from 1866. Became Ruston & Hornsby in 1918.
1857 Fletcher Jennings, Whitehaven. Became Lowca Engineering Co. Ltd. in 1884
1858 Manning Wardle Leeds, Closed 1927
1860 Hudswell Clarke, Leeds, Became Hudswell, Clarke and Rogers in 1870
1862 Lilleshall Company, Oakengates, Shropshire Last steam locos 1888.
1863 Dübs & Company, Glasgow Joined North British Locomotive Company in 1903
1863 James Cross & Company, Sutton Engine Works, St Helens
1863 Kitson & Company, Leeds Closed 1938
1864 Hunslet Engine Company, Leeds, Limited liability in 1902. Moved into diesels around 1930. Still occasionally built steam engines. Closed 1995, but the Barclay works remains as Hunslet-Barclay
1864 Fox, Walker & Company, Bristol, Became Peckett & Sons in 1880
1865 Yorkshire Engine Company, Sheffield Acquired in 1948 by United Steel. Diesel units produced from 1949. Taken over by Rolls-Royce in 1965 and worked transferred to Sentinel Waggon Works, Shrewsbury.
1865 Henry Hughes & Company, Loughborough, Became Falcon Railway Plant Works in 1883
1865 Black, Hawthorn & Company, Gateshead, Became Chapman & Furneaux in 1896
1865 Edward Borrows & Sons, St Helens
1865 Hopkins Gilkes & Company Middlesbrough Became Tees-side Iron and Engine Works Company Limited in 1875
1866 Avonside Engine Company, Bristol Closed 1934
1867 Nasmyth, Wilson & Company, Patricroft Limited liability in 1882. Became Patricroft Royal Ordnance Factory in 1939
1870 Hudswell, Clarke & Rogers, Leeds, Became Hudswell Clarke & Company in 1881
1872 Barclays & Company, Kilmarnock, Merged with Andrew Barclay and Company in 1888
1874 Sir Arthur P. Heywood, Duffield Pioneered 15-inch (380 mm) gauge, see Duffield Bank Railway
1875 WG Bagnall, Stafford, Limited liability in 1887. In 1951 taken over by Brush Traction as Brush Bagnall Traction
1875 Tees-side Iron & Engine Works Company Middlesbrough Closed 1880
1877 Hartley, Arnoux and Fanning, Stoke, Taken over by Kerr-Stuart in 1893
1878 Davies & Metcalfe, Manchester Built locomotives for the Vale of Rheidol Railway in 1902.
1880 Peckett & Sons, Atlas Works, Bristol, Last steam loco 1958. Taken over by Reed Crane and Hoist Co until this also closed, but name carried on by Peckett & Sons of Ongar
1881 James Kerr & Company, Glasgow Sub contracted loco building, then became Kerr, Stuart & Company at Stoke in 1893
1881 Hudswell Clarke, The Railway Foundry, Leeds Limited liability in 1899. Began building diesels approx 1920. Taken over by Hunslet Engineering
1883 Falcon Railway Plant Works, Loughborough, Became Brush Electrical Engineering Company in 1889
1883 Dick, Kerr & Company, Kilmarnock, Locomotive production moved to Preston in 1919.
1884 Clyde Locomotive Company, Atlas Works, Springburn Bought by Sharp Stewart in 1888
1884 Hawthorn Leslie & Company, Newcastle upon Tyne, Was R&W Hawthorne. Became R.Stephenson & Hawthorn in 1937
1884 Lowca Engineering Company, Whitehaven. Became New Lowca Engineering Co. Ltd. in 1905
1886 Clyde Locomotive Company, Glasgow 1886-1888 taken over by Sharp, Stewart
1889 Brush Electrical Engineering Company, Loughborough, Last steam 1914, closed in 2021
1893 Kerr, Stuart & Company, Stoke, Closed 1930
1896 Chapman and Furneaux Gateshead Took over Black Hawthorne & Co. Closed 1902
1897 Armstrong Whitworth, Newcastle Last locos approx 1937.
1898 Neilson, Reid & Company, Glasgow Amalgamated into the North British Locomotive Company in 1903
1903 North British Locomotive Company, Glasgow, Closed 1962
1905 New Lowca Engineering Company, Whitehaven. Closed 1912
1911 EE Baguley Burton upon Trent Now Baguley-Drewry
1918 English Electric Company, Taken over by General Electric Company in 1960
1918 Ruston & Hornsby Lincoln Last locomotives c.1967. Now specialises in gas turbines.
1937 Robert Stephenson & Hawthorns Darlington and Newcastle on Tyne, Became subsidiary of English Electric in 1962

== See also ==
- List of locomotive builders
- List of British railway-owned locomotive builders
