= Locomotives of Pakistan =

The fleet of locomotives in Pakistan currently consists solely of diesel locomotives owned and operated by Pakistan Railways. Steam locomotives are no longer used in Pakistan, except in heritage trains. All locomotives are serviced at the Pakistan Locomotive Factory in Risalpur, Khyber Pakhtunkhwa.

== Classification ==
=== Diesel locomotives ===
Not all the locomotives in this list are in service as some may have been renumbered.

Image	Class	Model	Number	Grouping	Manufacturer	Introduced	Speed	Status	Power	Comments
	ALP14	FCA-3 / ALCO DL212	23	(DE) 2001–2023	ALCO	1951 through 1953	90 km/h (56 mph)		1,400 bhp (1,040 kW)	
	ALPW16	DL500C	2	2024–2025	ALCO	1956	120 km/h (75 mph)		1,600 bhp (1,190 kW)	
	ALPW18	DL500CI	48	2026–2074	ALCO	1958	120 km/h (75 mph)	Scrapped	1,800 bhp (1,340 kW)	
Diesel locomotive no. 2095, class ARP20	ARP20	DL212	23	2075–2097	ALCO; Bombardier; Pakistan Locomotive Factory	1977-2010	120 km/h (75 mph)	Scrapped	2,000 bhp (1,490 kW)	
	CLP15	EMD F7	9	2101–2109	Clyde Engineering	1955-2005	123 km/h (76 mph)	Scrapped	1,500 bhp (1,120 kW)	funded by Australia under the Colombo Plan
	ALU14	E-1662	26	3301–3326	ALCO	1952	90 km/h (56 mph)	Scrapped	1,400 bhp (1,040 kW)	
	ALU18	DL541	30	3327–3356	ALCO	1961	120 km/h (75 mph)		1,800 bhp (1,340 kW)	
	ALU95	DL531	25	3400–3424	ALCO	1958	104 km/h (65 mph)	Scrapped	950 bhp (708 kW)	
	GEU61	GE 61-Ton Switcher	10	3501–3510	General Electric	1954	80 km/h (50 mph)		610 bhp (455 kW)	
	GEU64	?	5	3511–3515	General Electric	1954	80 km/h (50 mph)		640 bhp (477 kW)	
	FAU66	?	18	3601–3618	Alsthom	1954	72 km/h (45 mph)		660 bhp (492 kW)	
	FRAU75	GL-22-CU	2	3602/3609	Alsthom	1979	69 km/h (43 mph)		750 bhp (559 kW)	
	ALU26	DL560	1	3770	ALCO	1965	120 km/h (75 mph)		2,600 bhp (1,940 kW)	
	ALU12	DL535	53	3701–3753	ALCO	1962	96 km/h (60 mph)		1,200 bhp (895 kW)	
	ARPW20	DL 500C/FD-7	42	3801–3842	ALCO Bombardier	1982	120 km/h (75 mph)		2,000 bhp (1,490 kW)	
	ALU20R	DL541	7	3901–3907	ALCO; Bombardier; Pakistan Locomotive Factory	1982	120 km/h (75 mph)		2,000 bhp (1,490 kW)	
	GEU15	GE U15C	23	4001–4023	General Electric	1970	121 km/h (75 mph)		1,500 bhp (1,120 kW)	
	ALU20	DL543	52	4401–4452	ALCO	1962	120 km/h (75 mph)		2,000 bhp (1,490 kW)	One train is use for Samjhauta Express
Diesel locomotive no. 4483, class ARU20	ARU20	E 1662	26	4471–4496	ALCO Bombardier	1976	120 km/h (75 mph)		2,000 bhp (1,490 kW)	
	GMU 15	E 1503	32	4801–4832	GENERAL Motors	1975	110 km/h (68 mph)	Active	1,500 bhp (1,120 kW)	
	GEU20	U-20-C	42	4501–4542	General Electric	1971	121 km/h (75 mph)	Active	2,000 bhp (1,490 kW)	
	ALU24	DL-560	20	4601–4620	ALCO	1967	120 km/h (75 mph)		2,400 bhp (1,790 kW)	
	GMU30	GT-26-C W2	36	4701–4736	General Motors	1975	121 km/h (75 mph)	Active	3,000 bhp (2,240 kW)	
	GMCU15	GL-22-CU	30	4901–4930	General Motors	1979	120 km/h (75 mph)	Active	1,500 bhp (1,120 kW)	
	GRU20	C20-7i	48	5001–5048	ALCO, Bombardier, General Electric, Pakistan Locomotive Factory	1996	122 km/h (76 mph)	Scrapped	2,000 bhp (1,490 kW)	
	RGE20	C20-7i	27	5101–5127	General Electric Moghalpura Railway Workshops	1999	122 km/h (76 mph)	Active	2,000 bhp (1,490 kW)	
Diesel locomotive no. 5206, class RGE24	RGE24	GE C24-7i	21	5201–5221	General Electric; Moghalpura Railway Workshops	2002	122 km/h (76 mph)	Active	2,000 bhp (1,490 kW)	
	AGE30	DE-DC33-CA	30	6001–6030	Adtranz; General Electric; Pakistan Locomotive Factory	1996	122 km/h (76 mph)	Active	3,000 bhp (2,240 kW)	
	DPU30	Dloco CKD9	44	6101–6144	CRRC Dalian, ALCO	2003-2012	122 km/h (76 mph)	Withdrawn	2,000 bhp (1,490 kW)	
	DPU20	Dloco CKD8D	25	6201–6225	CRRC Dalian, ALCO	2003-2012	122 km/h (76 mph)	Withdrawn	2,000 bhp (1,490 kW)	
Diesel locomotive no. 6352, class ZCU30	ZCU30	Zyloco SDD23	34	6301–6329，6351–6355	CRRC Ziyang, Caterpillar	2014	120 km/h (75 mph)	Active	3,000 bhp (2,240 kW)	
Diesel locomotive no. 6412, class ZCU20	ZCU20	Zyloco SDD22	29	6401–6429	CRRC Ziyang, Caterpillar	2014	120 km/h (75 mph)	Active	2,628 bhp (1,960 kW)	
	HAU10	HF-10A	4	6601–6604	Hitachi ALCO	1980	72 km/h (45 mph)		1,000 bhp (746 kW)	
Diesel locomotive no. 8022, class HAU20	HAU20	HF-22A	28	8001–8028	Hitachi ALCO	1982-2018	120 km/h (75 mph)	Scrapped	2,000 bhp (1,490 kW)	
Diesel locomotive no. 8064, class HBU20	HBU20	?	60	8029–8088	Hitachi ALCO	1986	120 km/h (75 mph)	Active	2,200 bhp (1,640 kW)	
	HPU20	HFA-24P	10	8101–8110	Hitachi	1982-2000	120 km/h (75 mph)	Scrapped	2,000 bhp (1,490 kW)	
	HGMU30	GT 26 CW-2	30	8201–8230	Thyssen-Henschel, EMD	1985	120 km/h (75 mph)	Active	3,200 bhp (2,390 kW)	
Diesel locomotive no. 8318, class PHA20	PHA20	DE2200	23	8301–8323	Hitachi; Pakistan Locomotive Factory ALCO	1993	125 km/h (78 mph)	Active	2,200 bhp (1,640 kW)	
Diesel locomotive no. 9024, class GEU40	GEU40	GE Evolution Series ES43ACi	55	9001–9055	General Electric	2017	120 km/h (75 mph)	Active	4,563 bhp (3,400 kW)	Freight Trains
Diesel locomotive no. 4558, class GEU20	GEU20	GE Evolution Series/GE C20EMP	20	4551–4570	General Electric	2019	120 km/h (75 mph)	Active	2,200 bhp (1,640 kW)	
			Total 980							

=== Historic Electric locomotives ===
Pakistan Railways has 29 electric locomotives of class BCU30E numbered 7001–7029. These are British-built locomotives of 3,000 horsepower for 25 kV AC. They are stored out of use because the overhead lines are unserviceable.

Image	Class	Model	Number	Grouping	Manufacturer	Introduced	Speed	Status	Power	Comments
Electric locomotive no. 7027, class BCU30E	BCU-30E		29	7001-7029	English Electric	1967-2011		Retired	3000 bhp	

=== Steam Locomotives ===
Image	Class	Model	Grouping	Manufacturer	Grouping	Build Year	PWR	Retired	Status	Power	Comment
	G	2-8-0	40-50	North British Locomotive Company		1919	1947	1998			46 Number loco are Preserved In Multan Railway Station Outside 57 Number loco are preserved at the Pakistan Railway headquarters at Lahore 54 Number Loco are preserved In Railway Golf Club
	GS	2-8-2	50-74	North British Locomotive Company		1921		1998			62 Number loco are preserved in Hasan abdal Station 63 Number loco are preserved In Landi Kotal Museum Outside 64 Number loco are preserved in Golra Sharif Jn Railway Station 74 Number loco are preserved in Quetta Railway Station
	HG	2-8-2	90-99	AEG (German Company)		1927		1995			
	M	4-6-0	60-70	North British Locomotive Company		1913		1995			63 Number loco are preserved in Karachi Cantt Railway Station Outside.
	MS	4-6-0	65-70	North British Locomotive Company		1913		1995			69 Number loco are preserved in Hamdard University Karachi
	PS	4-6-0	120-139	Hanomag		1914		1998			
	SP	4-6-0	125-150	Kerr, Stuart & Company		1921		1998			127 Number loco are preserved in Tando Adam Jn Station 138 Number loco are preserved in Risalpur Loco Factory 140 Number loco are preserved in Hyderabad Jn Station
	ZB	2-6-2	201-229	Hanomag		1932		1998			201 Number loco are preserved in Samasatta Jn Shed Station 202 Number loco are preserved in Peshawar Cantt Railway Station Outside 203 Number loco are preserved in Rawalpindi Station Outside 205 Number loco are preserved in Lahore Jn Station Outside 207 Number loco are preserved in Golra Sharif Jn Railway Station
	ZE	2-6-2	230-239	Hanomag		1932		1998			232 Number loco are preserved in Rohri Jn Loco Shed Station 234 Number loco are preserved in DS Office Lahore Outside
	SGC	0-6-0	201-286	Vulcan Foundry		1909					
	SGC	0-6-0	300-310	Vulcan Foundry		1923		1985			
	SPS	4-4-0	401-410	Vulcan Foundry		1914		1998			
	YD	2-8-2	511-525	Nippon		1929		2005			518 Number loco are Sukkur Railway Station Display 519 Number loco are Stored In Mirpur Khas Shed 520 Number loco are Stored In Mirpur Khas Shed 522 Number loco are Stored In Mirpur Khas Shed 523 Number loco are Stored In Mirpur Khas Shed 524 Number loco are Stored In Mirpur Khas Shed
	YE	2-8-2	721-739	Nippon		1952		2010			
	SGC	0-6-0	991-999	Vulcan Foundry		1906		1990			
	SGC	0-6-0	1000-1055	Vulcan Foundry		1906		1985			1055 Number loco are Used in Punjab Irrigation Department Gharibwal Quarry
	SGC	0-6-0	1120-1199	Vulcan Foundry		1909		1995			1179 Number loco are Used in Punjab Irrigation Department Shahpur Quarry Shikanwali
	SGC	0-6-0	1200-1299	Vulcan Foundry		1911		1990			
	SGC	0-6-0	1300-1360	Vulcan Foundry		1910		1998			
	HGC	2-8-0	2180-2199	Kitson & Company		1914		1998			
	HGC	2-8-0	2200-2299	Kitson & Company		1914		1998			2216 Number loco are preserved in Wagah Border Museum 2264 Stored Peshawar Shed 2277 Stored Lahore Shed 2270 Stored Lahore Shed
	HGC	2-8-0	2300-2310	Vulcan Foundry		1922			Active		2303 Number loco are preserved in Rawalpindi Shed 2306 Number loco are preserved in Rawalpindi Shed
	SG	0-6-0	2311-2399	Vulcan Foundry		1920		1998			
	SGS	0-6-0	2400-2499	Vulcan Foundry		1920		1998			2473 Number loco are preserved in Asfand Yar Bukhari Shaheed Park Attock City
	SGS	0-6-0	2501-2530	Vulcan Foundry		1922		1998			
	XA	4-6-2	2640-2699	Vulcan Foundry		1929		1998			2657 Stored Lahore Shed
	XA	4-6-2	2700-2710	Vulcan Foundry		1929		1995			
	SPS	4-4-0	2950-2999	Vulcan Foundry		1914		1998			
	SPS	4-4-0	3000-3078	Vulcan Foundry		1921		1998			
	SPS	4-4-0	3140-3195	Vulcan Foundry		1914		1995			
	SGS	0-6-0	4010-4097	Vulcan Foundry		1905		1982			
	SGS	0-6-0	4127-4192	Vulcan Foundry		1905					
	SGS	0-6-0	4200-4299	Vulcan Foundry		1912		1985			
	CWD	2-8-2	5000-5098	Canadian Locomotive Company		1945		1998			
	CWD	2-8-2	5100-5188	Montreal Locomotive Works		1945		1997			
	CWD	2-8-2	5580-5599	Montreal Locomotive Works		1945		1979			
	CWD	2-8-2	5600-5690	Montreal Locomotive Works		1944		1995			
	CWD	2-8-2	5700-5736	Canadian Locomotive Company		1945		1998			5734 Number loco are preserved in Golra Sharif Jn Railway Station 5735 Number loco are preserved in Lahore Cantt Railway Station

== See also ==
- Pakistan Railways
- List of locomotive builders
