= List of British railway-owned locomotive builders =

Many early locomotive works disappeared as railways merged or they became simply motive power depots. Some, like Bromsgrove, made only one or two new locomotives but, for even the largest, overhaul and repair of the existing fleet was the main activity.

See also List of locomotive builders and List of early British private locomotive manufacturers

Year	Works location	Railway company
1826	Shildon	Stockton and Darlington Railway
1830	Edge Hill	Liverpool and Manchester Railway
1831	Gateshead railway works	Newcastle and Darlington Railway
1838	Wolverton	London and Birmingham Railway
1839	Edge Hill	Grand Junction Railway
1840	Bromsgrove	Birmingham and Gloucester Railway
1840	Brighton	London and Brighton Railway
1840	Derby	North Midland Railway
1841	Crewe	Grand Junction Railway
1842	Cowlairs	Edinburgh and Glasgow Railway
1842	Longsight railway works	Manchester and Birmingham Railway
1843	Nine Elms	London and South Western Railway
1844	Darlington	North Eastern Railway
1845	Wolverton	London and North Western Railway
1845	Ashford	South Eastern and Chatham Railway
1846	Swindon	Great Western Railway
1846	Greenock	Caledonian Railway
1846	Barrow-in-Furness	Furness Railway
1847	Miles Platting	Lancashire and Yorkshire Railway
1848	Gorton	Manchester, Sheffield and Lincolnshire Railway (to Great Central Railway)
1849	Wolverhampton	Shrewsbury and Birmingham Railway
1850	Bow	North London Railway
1851	Stratford	Great Eastern Railway
1853	Earlestown railway works	LNWR Formerly Jones and Potts
1853	Doncaster	Great Northern Railway
1854	St Rollox (Glasgow)	Caledonian Railway
1854	York	North Eastern Railway
1856	St. Margarets	North British Railway
1856	Cardiff	Taff Vale Railway
1857	Kilmarnock	Glasgow and South Western Railway
1857	Maryport	Maryport and Carlisle Railway
1859	Bristol	Great Western Railway
1862	Bury	Lancashire and Yorkshire Railway
1862	Highbridge	Somerset and Dorset Joint Railway
1868	Stoke	North Staffordshire Railway
1869	Longhedge	London Chatham and Dover Railway
1869	Lochgorm (Inverness)	Highland Railway
1874	Sheffield	Great Central Railway
1876	Newton Heath	Lancashire and Yorkshire Railway
1889	Horwich	Lancashire and Yorkshire Railway
1891	Eastleigh	London and South Western Railway
1897	Melton Constable	Midland and Great Northern Joint Railway
1899	Caerphilly	Rhymney Railway
1909	Inverurie	Great North of Scotland Railway

== Sources ==
- Atkins, P., (1999) The Golden Age of Steam Locomotive Building, Penrhyn: Atlantic Transport Publications
- Larkin, E.J., Larkin, J.G., (1988) The Railway Workshops of Great Britain 1823–1986, Macmillan Press
