= Queensland Double Boilered Cross locomotive =

Queensland Railways Double Boilered Cross Locomotives class
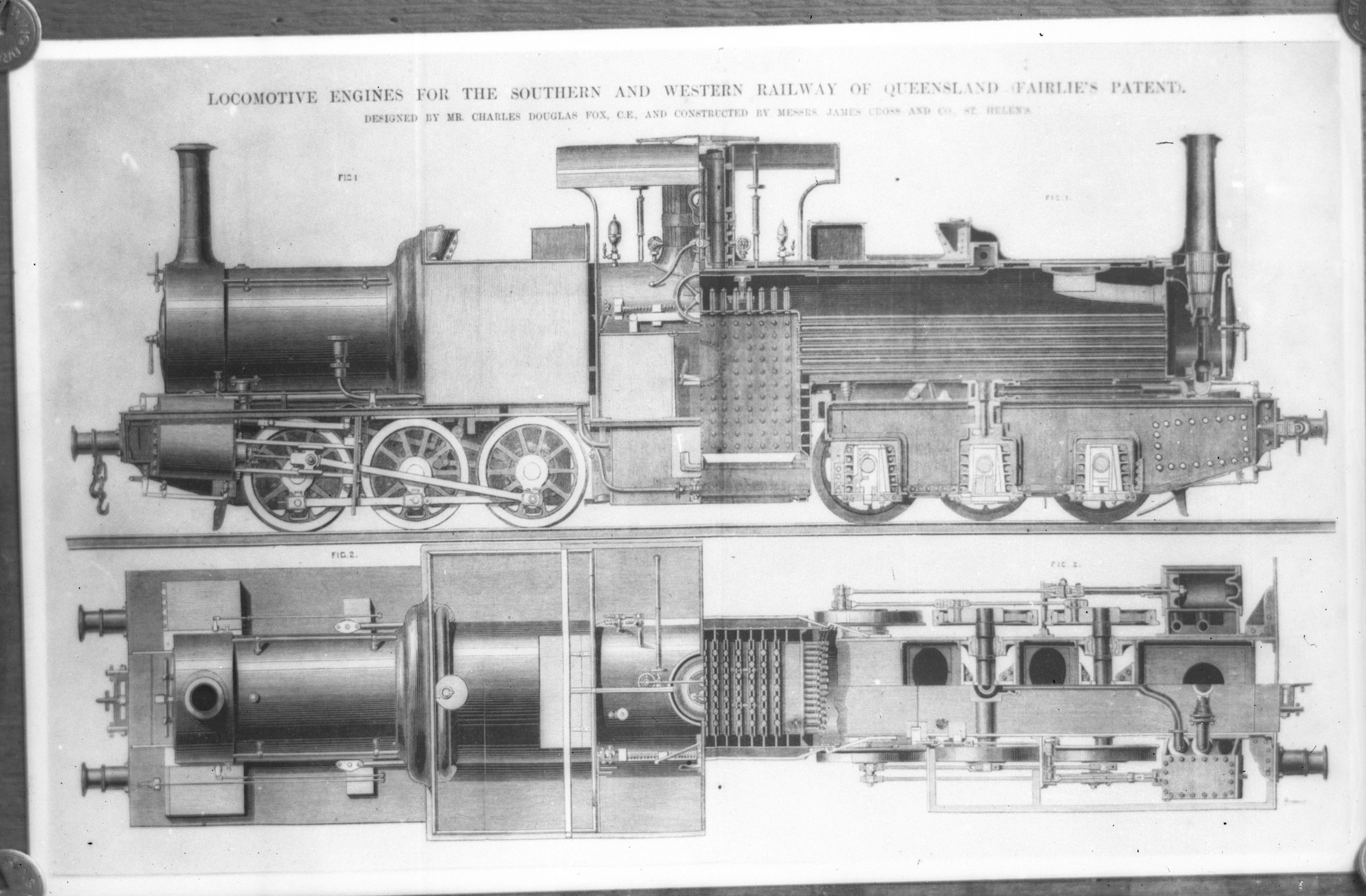
- Plans of Fairlie Double Boiler Cross locomotive, 1867
Type and origin
- Power type: Steam
- Builder: James Cross & Co
- Build date: 1867
- Total produced: 3
Specifications
- Configuration
  - Whyte: 0-6-6-0T (de jure); 0-6-0+0-6-0T (de facto)
- Gauge: 1,067 mm (3 ft 6 in) (as built); 1,435 mm (4 ft 8 1/2 in) (after rebuild)
- Fuel type: Coal
- Cylinders: 4 outside
- Cylinder size: 11 in × 18 in (279 mm × 457 mm)
Career
- Operators: Queensland Railways; Central Argentine Railway; Burry Port and Gwendraeth Valley Railway
- Disposition: all scrapped

The Queensland Railways Double Boilered Cross Locomotives class locomotive was a locomotive class of 0-6-6-0T steam locomotives built for, but never operated by, the Queensland Railways.

== History ==
In 1867, James Cross and Company of St Helens, England, delivered three 1,067 mm (3 ft 6 in) 0-6-6-0T double boilered locomotives as knocked down kits to the Queensland Railways' North Ipswich Railway Workshops.

One was assembled coming in six tons overweight. After operating two trials on the line to Toowoomba, where it spread the rails and ultimately derailed, Queensland Railways refused to accept them. After four years in storage, they were repatriated to England and converted to 1,435 mm (4 ft 8 1/2 in). Two were sold to the Central Argentine Railway for use at Montevideo, while the third was sold to the Burry Port and Gwendraeth Valley Railway in Wales and named Victoria.
