= KFNB Minotaurus and Ajax =

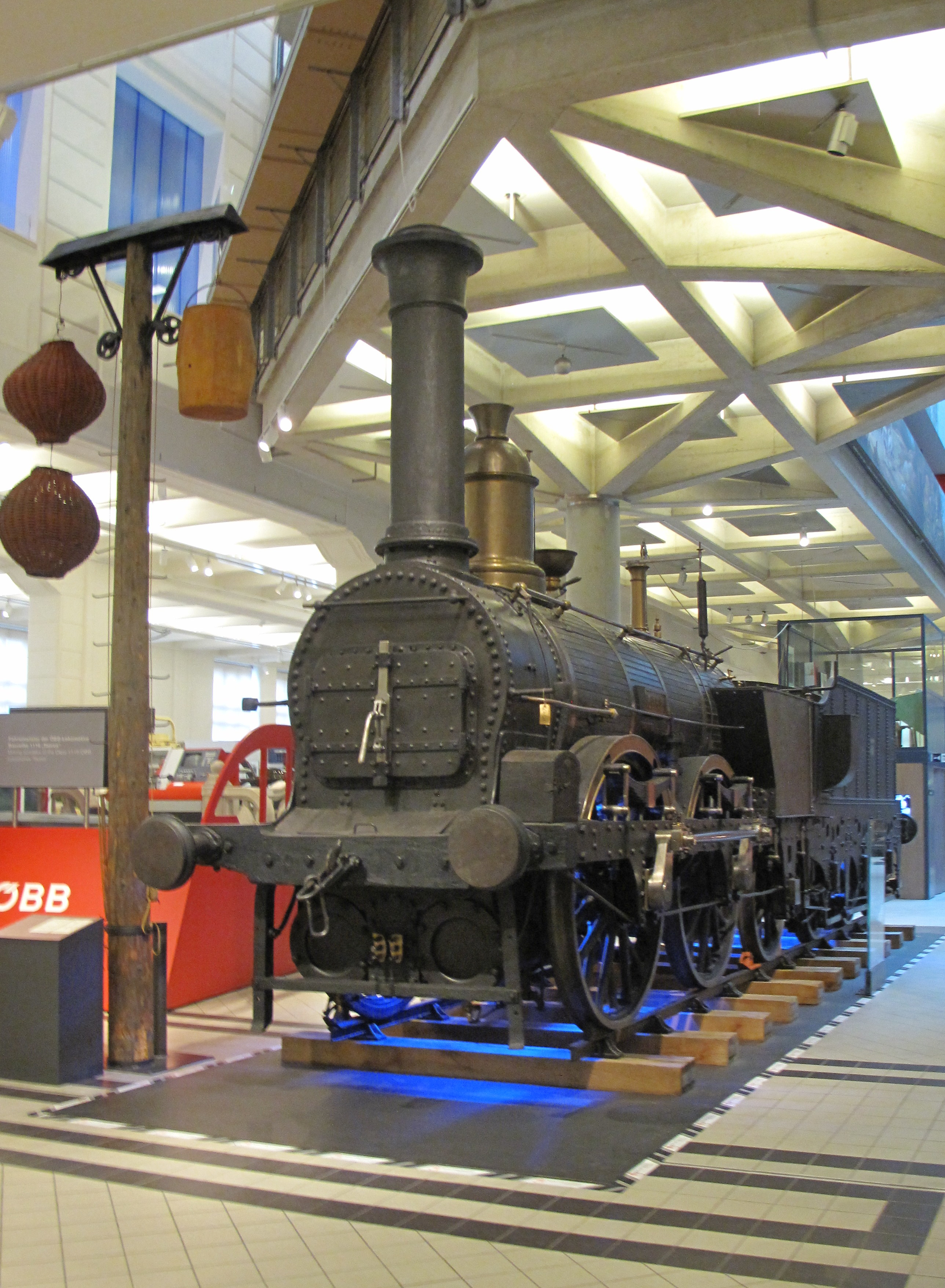
- Ajax preserved at the Technisches Museum Wien (Vienna Technical Museum).
Type and origin
- Power type: Steam
- Builder: Jones, Turner and Evans, Newton-le-Willows, England
- Build date: 1841
- Total produced: 2
Specifications
- Configuration
  - Whyte: 0-4-2
  - UIC: B1 n2
- Gauge: 4 ft 8 1/2 in (1,435 mm)
- Cylinders: Two, inside
Career
- Operators: Emperor Ferdinand Northern Railway
- Delivered: 1841
- Last run: 1874
- Preserved: 1
- Restored: 1909
- Current owner: Technisches Museum Wien
- Disposition: Preserved

The Minotaurus and Ajax were a pair of 0-4-2 steam locomotives purchased by the Kaiser Ferdinands-Nordbahn (KFNB) – Emperor Ferdinand Northern Railway from Jones, Turner and Evans of Newton-le-Willows, England in 1841; Minotaurus has been scrapped, Ajax survives and is believed to be the oldest preserved steam locomotive on the European mainland and is currently exhibited at the Technisches Museum Wien (Vienna Technical Museum).

== History ==
Minotaurus and Ajax were acquired in 1841 to work the line between Vienna and Stockerau. They were a distinctively English design with inside cylinders. The two locomotives had to be disassembled for shipping. They were loaded onto carts and first shipped to Vienna, after which they were reassembled. They were used for both passenger and freight operations, especially transporting raw materials from Moravia and Silesia.

Minotaurus was withdrawn from service in 1867 and used in the construction of the Moravian-Silesian Northern Railway, until it was retired in 1871.

Ajax was given a new tender in 1847 and fitted with a replacement boiler in 1857. It was used until 1874 when it was withdrawn and stored in a locomotive shed but not scrapped. It was rediscovered and restored in 1909 for the railway line's 70th anniversary celebration. It was then kept at the ‘Heizhaus’ at Strasshof an der Nordbahn until it was transferred to its present location at the Technisches Museum Wien in 1992. It is described by the museum as ‘the oldest preserved steam locomotive on the European continent.’
