= Pakistan Locomotive Factory =

Locomotive manufacturer in Pakistan

Pakistan Locomotive Factory Risalpur
- Native name: پاکستان لوکوموٹو کارخانه رسالپور
- Type: State-owned enterprise
- Industry: Locomotive Manufacturing
- Founded: 1993; 33 years ago
- Headquarters: Risalpur, Khyber Pakhtunkhwa, Pakistan
- Products: Locomotives
- Owner: Government of Pakistan

Pakistan Locomotive Factory (Urdu: پاکستان لوکوموٹیو کارخانہ رسالپور, or PLF) is a manufacturer of locomotives for Pakistan Railways, located in Risalpur, Khyber Pakhtunkhwa, Pakistan. The company was established in 1993.

== History ==
The factory was established in Risalpur in 1993 at a total cost of Rs. 2284 million (US$8.2 million). Its function is to manufacture indigenous diesel electric locomotives and electric locomotives, thus allowing Pakistan Railways to have less dependency on foreign technology.

However, over the years, the facility has struggled with low-capacity utilization, with only 54 units being produced from 2003 to 2008, while only five units were assembled during 2014–15.

In January 2016, the Minister for Railways, Khawaja Saad Rafique announced that Pakistan Locomotive Factory is to enter a joint venture with private sector participation.

== Function ==
The designed production capacity of the factory is 25 diesel electric locomotives per year. The production capacity can however be increased by introducing double shifts. Technology for manufacturing of locomotives have been acquired over the years from Hitachi, General Electric, Adtranz, and Dalian Locomotive and Rolling Stock Works. Since 1993, the factory has manufactured a total of 102 new 2000-3000 hp diesel-electric locomotives for Pakistan Railways. It has also refurbished 26 outdated locomotives of 2000-2400 hp. Various spare parts for locomotives are also manufactured.

According to Pakistan Railways' yearbook for 2014–2015, a total of 1,052 work orders have been completed for Pakistan Railways, amounting to Rs. 503.256 million (US$1.8 million). Work orders completed for private sector are 34 in number, amounting to Rs. 55.875 million (US$200,000) and work orders completed for major repairs of DE locomotives are 138 number amounting to Rs. 268.660 million (US$960,000).

== Projects ==
=== Current ===
- 75 DE locomotives from General Electric, comprising:
  - 55 CBUs of 4000 hp
  - 2 CBUs of 2000 hp
  - 18 CKDs of 2000 hp
- Locomotive Rehabilitation Project MGPR

=== Completed ===
- 23 DE locomotives (2000 hp, Hitachi), 1993-97, Class PHA 20
- Rehabilitation of 5 DE locomotives (2000 hp, GE), 1997–98, Class RGE 20
- 30 DE locomotives (3000 hp, GE & Adtranz), 1999-01, Class AGE 30
- Rehabilitation of 21 DE locomotives (2000/2400 hp, GE), 2001-03, Class RGE 24
- 25 DE locomotives (2000 hp, Chinese), 2003–08, Class DPU 20 , now scrapped.
- 44 DE locomotives (3000 hp, Chinese), 2003–08, Class DPU 30 , now sold as scrap.
- 5 DE locomotives (3000 hp, Chinese), 2014–15

Abbreviations

- CBU = Completely built unit (locomotives supplied fully assembled)
- CKD = Complete knock down (locomotives supplied in kit form and assembled locally)
- DE = Diesel-electric
- hp = Horsepower

Note

There are some disagreements between sources irfca.org and pakistanrail.com . For example, on horsepower of Class DPU 30. There are also minor differences in building dates.

== See also ==
- Locomotives of Pakistan
- Pakistan Railways Carriage Factory
- Moghalpura Railway Workshops
