= Spoorijzer =

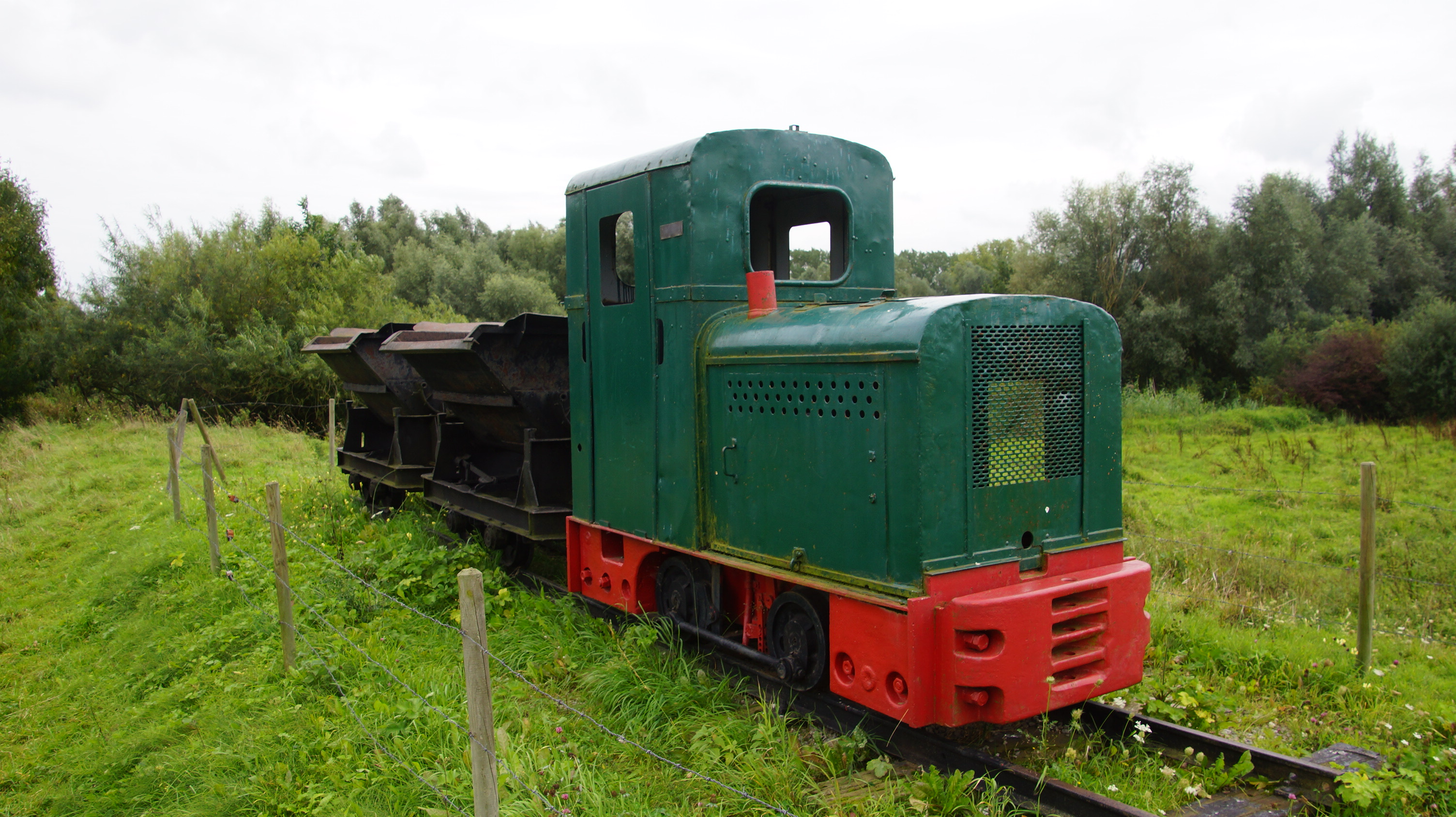
Spoorijzer N.V. Delft, No 1252 from 1956

Spoorijzer N.V., or shortened SIJ for NV Spoorwegmaterieel en IJzerconstructie, was a narrow gauge railway manufacturer in Delft, Netherlands.

== History ==
The company was set up on 4 November 1912 as J.C. Goudriaan's Industrie- en Exportmaatschappij.

The company built in the 1950s approximately 100 "Rail Tractors" which were commonly used in brick factories to replace horses. In total about 160 narrow rail locomotives were built. The last remaining SIJ buildings were closed after several re-organisations in 1977.

The company also imported locomotives from Ruston & Hornsby, for use within the Netherlands and its colonies.

== Remaining locomotives ==
- Spoorijzer RT 8, power: 8hp, gauge: 700 mm (2 ft 3 9/16 in), formerly Hollandsch-Duitsche Steenfabriek, now: Nationaal Smalspoormuseum, Valkenburg
- Spoorijzer RT 8, Serial No 221, 1962, power: 8hp, gauge: 700 mm, formerly Betonfabriek De Ringvaart, now: Nationaal Smalspoormuseum, Valkenburg
- Spoorijzer RT 8, Serial No 106, 1952, power: 8hp, gauge: 700 mm, formerly Oving Spoor, now: Nationaal Smalspoormuseum, Valkenburg
- Spoorijzer RT 11, Serial No 248, 1963, power: 11hp, gauge: 700 mm, formerly Betonfabriek De Ringvaart, now: Nationaal Smalspoormuseum, Valkenburg
- Spoorijzer RT 8, Serial No 107, 1952, power: 8hp, gauge: 700 mm, formerly Oving Spoor, now: Nationaal Smalspoormuseum, Valkenburg
- Spoorijzer RT 11, Serial No 001, 1966, gauge: 700 mm, formerly NBM Funderingstechniek Gorinchem, now: Nationaal Smalspoormuseum, Valkenburg
- Spoorijzer locomotive of 1956, Serial No 1252, now: Gendt, Lingewaard, Waaldijk
