= Edward Borrows and Sons =

UK business

- Industry: Engineering
- Founded: 1865 (Note: Lowe gives a plausible date of 1865, although Borrows' own letterhead claims 1860.)
- Founder: Edward Borrows
- Headquarters: St Helens, England
- Products: Steam locomotives

Edward Borrows and Sons was founded in 1865 by Edward Borrows, formerly of James Cross and Company. It was located at Providence Works, Sutton, near St Helens, England. The company's business included iron and brass founding and repairs to small locomotive engines.

The company first started building railway locomotives in 1872, specializing in a single small 0-4-0WT well tank design, which it sold primarily to Brunner Mond, Pilkington Brothers, and United Alkali Company. By 1878 there were around 50 employees, a quarter of whom were young apprentices and boys.

J.A. Borrows died in 1912 and the property was placed for sale. At this time the works covered "18,000 square yards (Note: 3.7 acres; 1.5 hectares) or thereabouts". The locomotive manufacturing business was taken over by H. W. Johnson and Company. (Note: Lowe and Allibone give dates of 1910 and 'shortly after 1910' for this takeover.) By 1913, around 40 locomotives had been built. Works numbers up to 58 were allocated, and some named locomotives are known, without knowing their works number. The discrepancy may be explained by the missing numbers having been allocated to some steam rollers, or other general machinery, which are known to have been built.

Between 1912 and 1921, Kerr, Stuart & Co. built at least 17 more locomotives of this design for Brunner Mond. The final builds were three between 1913 and 1921, begun at the original Providence Works but completed at other sites nearby.

In some years, up to three locomotives were completed in a year. In others there were none, and the works operated with other engineering work.

== Design ==
Borrows
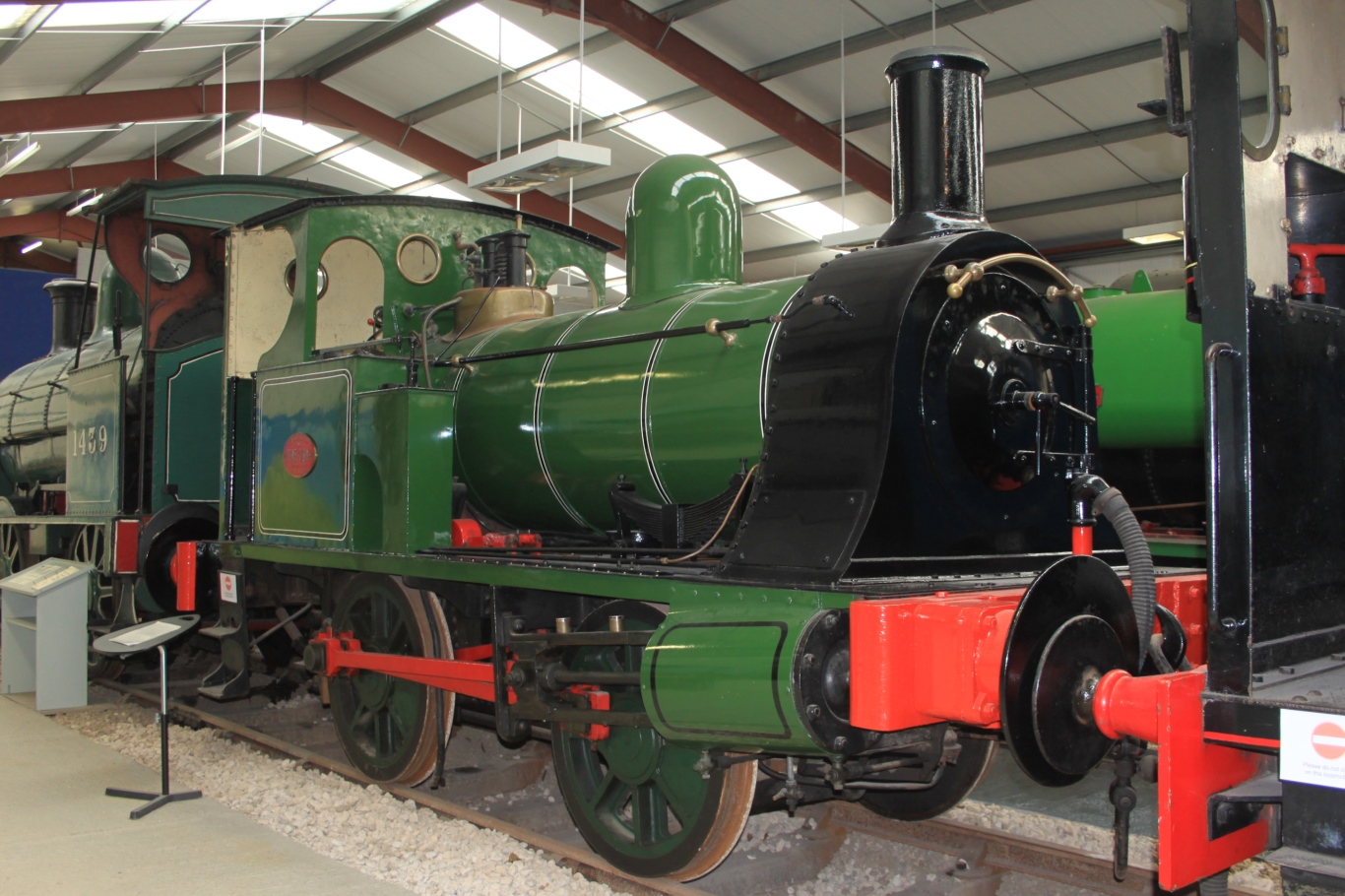
- Preserved Borrows locomotive The King
Type and origin
- Power type: Steam
- Designer: James Cross, 1866
- Builder: Edward Borrows and Sons
- Build date: 1872–1921
- Total produced: around 60
Specifications
- Configuration
  - Whyte: 0-4-0WT
- Gauge: 4 ft 8 1/2 in (1,435 mm)
- Coupled dia.: 3 ft 4 in (1.02 m)
- Wheelbase: 6 ft 6 in (1.98 m)
- Length
  - Over couplers: 20 ft 1 1/2 in (6.134 m)
- Height: 11 ft 1 1/4 in (3.385 m)
- Loco weight: 25 LT (25 t)
- Fuel capacity: 8 1/2 long cwt (950 lb; 430 kg)
- Water cap.: 321 imp gal (1,460 L; 386 US gal)
- Boiler
  - Type: Domed, round-topped firebox
  - Small tubes: 160× 1 3/4 in (44 mm); 138× 1 3/4 in (44 mm) (Note: Pilkington's, as rebuilt)
- Boiler pressure: 160 psi (11 bar)
- Safety valve: Ramsbottom safety valves
- Heating surface
  - Firebox: 54.11 sq ft (5.027 m^{2}); 48 sq ft (4.5 m^{2})
  - Tubes: 597.8 sq ft (55.54 m^{2}); 454 sq ft (42.2 m^{2})
  - Total surface: 651.91 sq ft (60.564 m^{2}); 502 sq ft (46.6 m^{2})
- Cylinders: 2
- Cylinder size: 14 1/2 in × 20 in (370 mm × 510 mm); 12" and 14" diameter cylinders on some early locos
- Valve gear: Stephenson
- Valve type: Vertical-face slide valves
- Train brakes: unfitted
Performance figures
- Tractive effort: 13,000 lbf (58,000 N)
Career
- Preserved: 3

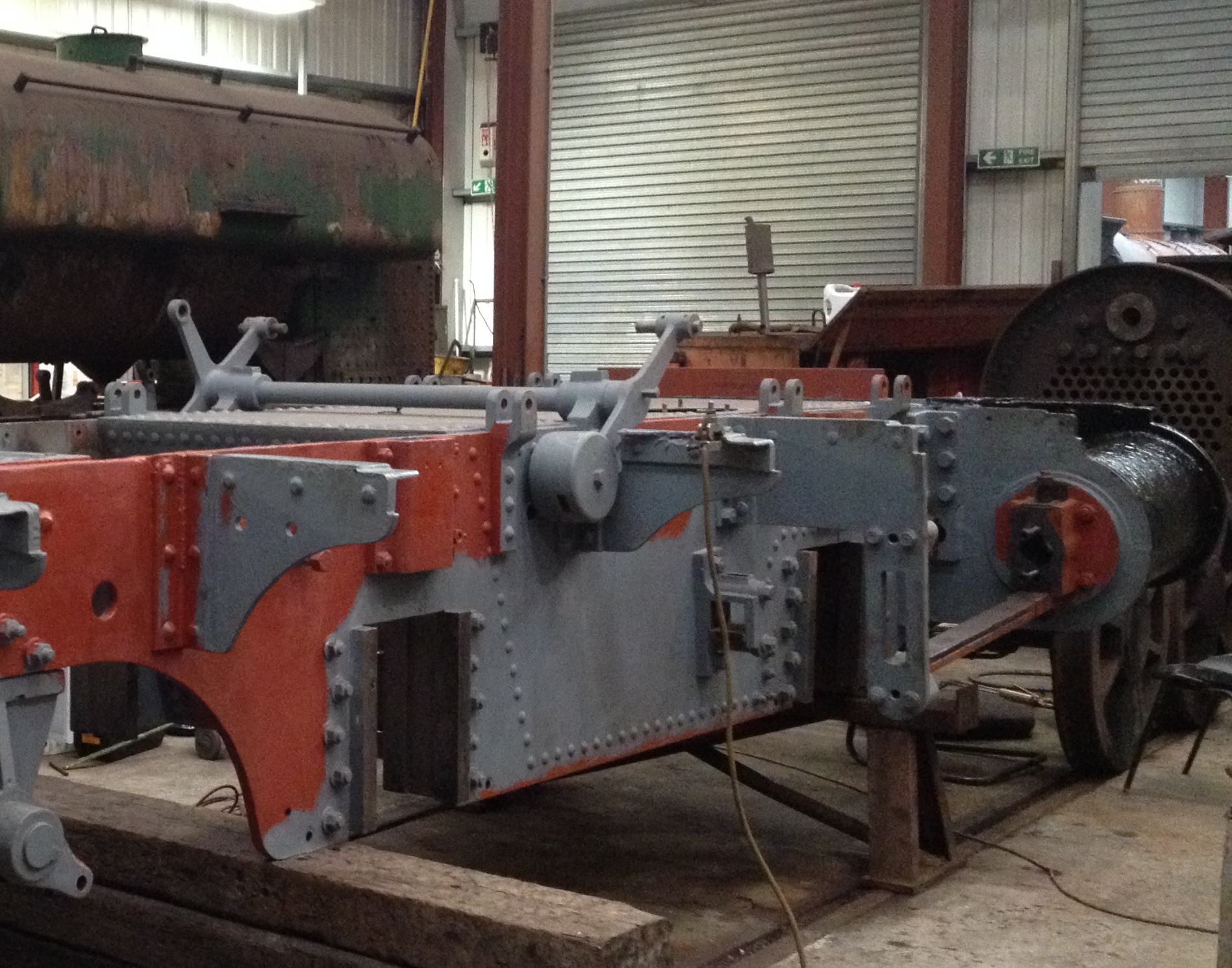
Frames of Windle, 2016. The riveted well tank can just be seen, as can the guide for the valve spindle, fixed unusually to the outside of the frames.

All of the Borrows locomotives were of the same design, with only detail variations. This had originated with James Cross in 1866.

The design provided compact locomotives with a short wheelbase, but also a short overall length relative to this wheelbase, so that the overhang at each end remained short, avoided problems with the buffers swinging from side to side on sharp corners. The rear axle was placed beneath the firebox, rather than in front of it. The valvegear was conventional Stephenson, although it was placed unusually. As the firebox and well tank gave no room for conventional inside motion, the valvegear was instead placed between the wheels and the outside of the frames. This required the wheels to be overhung outside their bearing further than was usual, but this was not a problem on a light locomotive. The motion was also easily accessible for lubrication and maintenance. Because the slide valves were mounted outside of the frames, the smokebox curved outwards at the bottom to contain the steam pipes. The locos were early adopters of a Wakefield mechanical lubricator.

At least some of the Pilkington's locomotives were rebuilt and reboilered with fewer boiler tubes.

The design was a conventional well tank, with the tank made integral with the frames. This had a stiffening effect. After the Pilkington's rebuilding, separate tank sides were provided. This made the frames less rigid and gave trouble with racking.

== Preservation ==
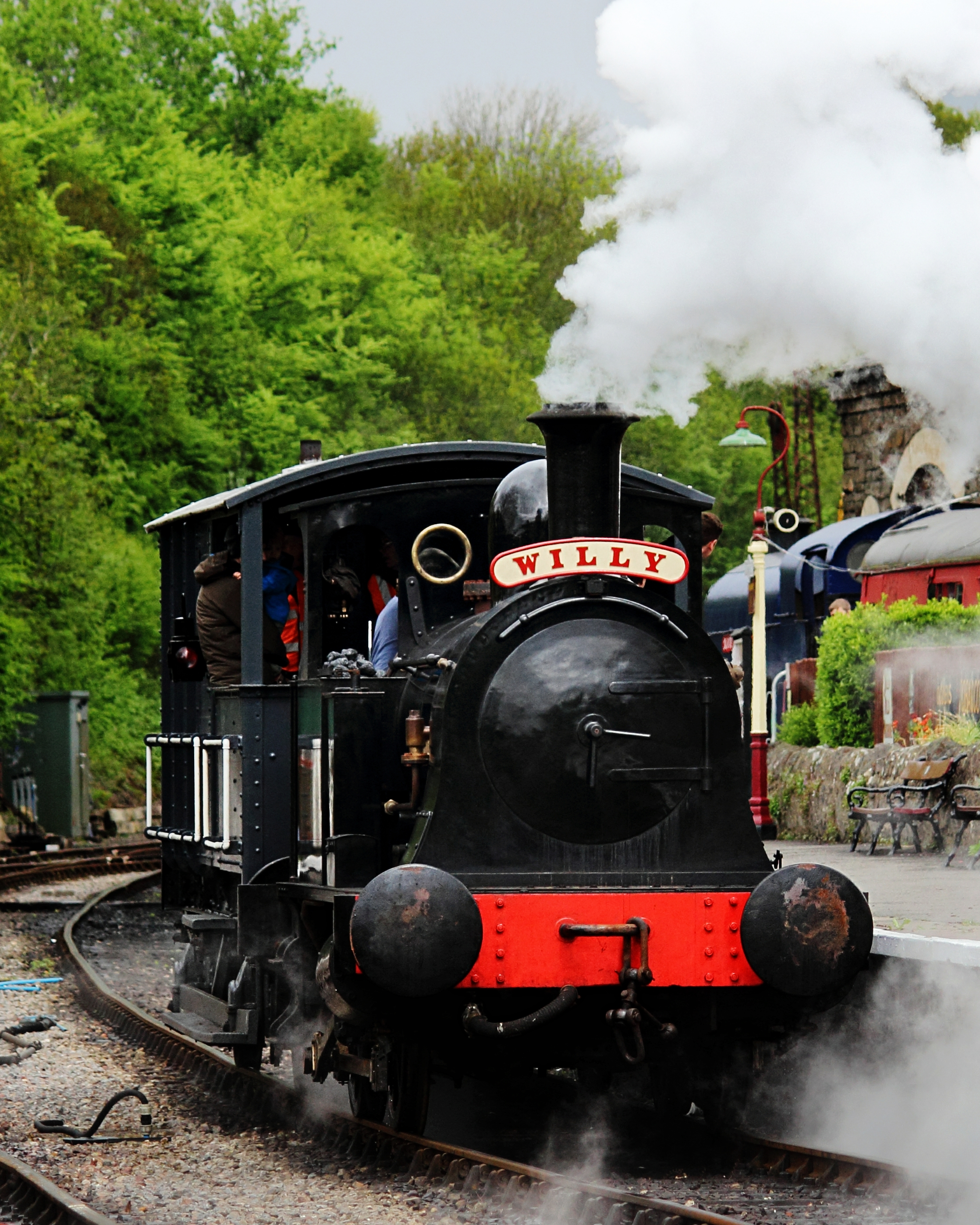
Willy the Well Tank at the Avon Valley Railway in 2013

Three Borrows locomotives are preserved. No. 3 (1898) (Note: Works No 37, originally Eccleston No 4) is at the Tanfield Railway and The King (1906) and Windle (1909) are at the Ribble Steam Railway.

A fourth locomotive, one of the Kerr, Stuart group, worked at National Shipyard No.1 in Chepstow and was preserved by Fairfield-Mabey bridge works. It is now in occasional gala service as Willy the Well-Tank.
