= James Cross and Company =

- Industry: Engineering
- Founded: c.1863
- Founder: James Cross
- Headquarters: St. Helens, England
- Key people: James Cross, Edward Borrows, Arthur Sinclair
- Products: Steam locomotives

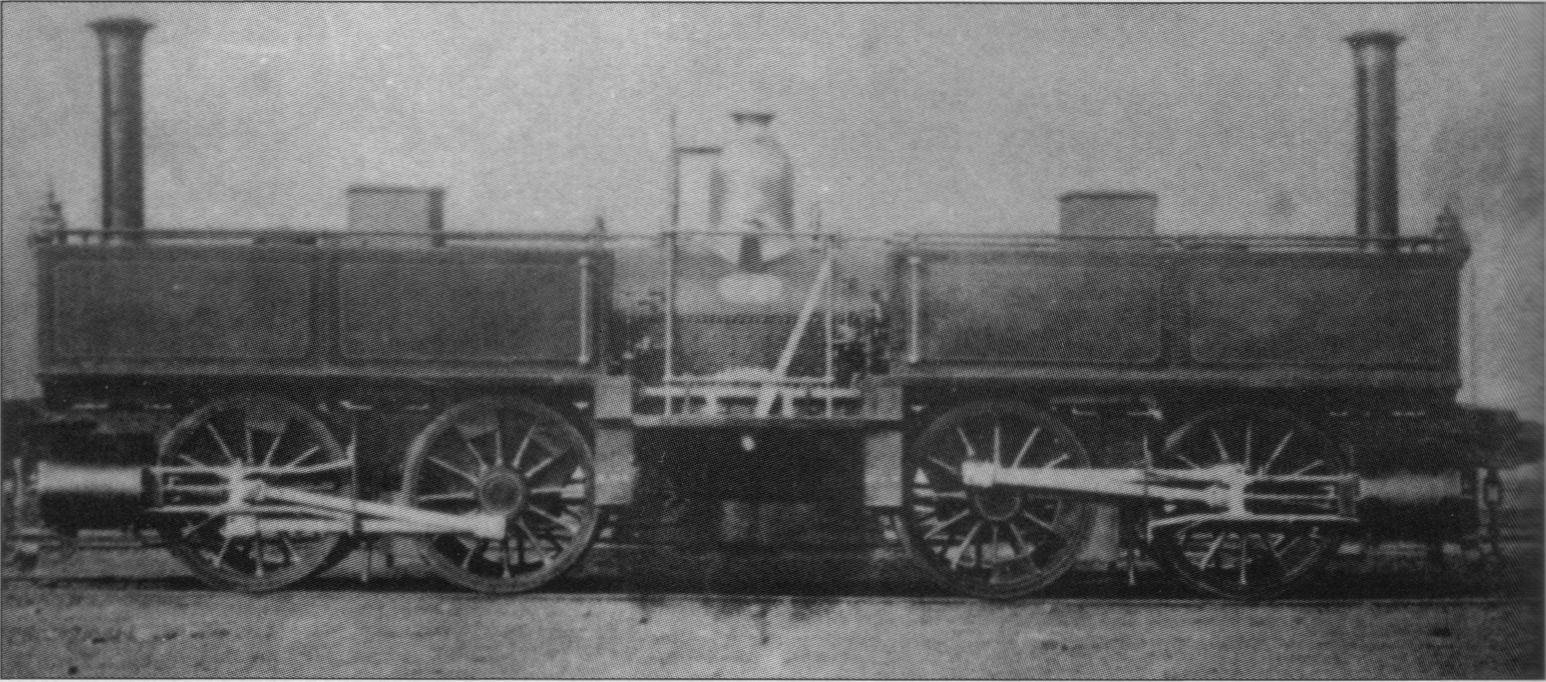
Mountaineer built in 1866 by James Cross and Company

James Cross and Company was a locomotive building company established around 1863 at Sutton Engine Works, St. Helens, England. The partners were James Cross, Edward Borrows and Arthur Sinclair, all of whom were former employees of the St Helens Railway. The company is notable for having built the first double Fairlie locomotive.

== Locomotives ==
The company's first locomotive was White Raven, a 2-4-2T built for the St Helens Railway in 1863. The second, built 1864, was a Fell locomotive for the Mont Cenis Railway.

A 0-4-4-0T Fairlie locomotive named Progress was built in 1865 for the Neath and Brecon Railway. This was followed in 1866 by another 0-4-4-0T Fairlie named Mountaineer for the Anglesey Central Railway. Three 3ft 6in gauge 0-6-6-0T Fairlies were built in 1866/67 for service in Queensland, Australia but these were rejected because they were overweight. They were returned to England, re-gauged and re-sold.

The company ceased trading in 1869 after building about 60 locomotives. The last batch, comprising 30 locomotives, was built for the East Indian Railway.
