= Gibbons and Harris =

Steam locomotive manufacturer

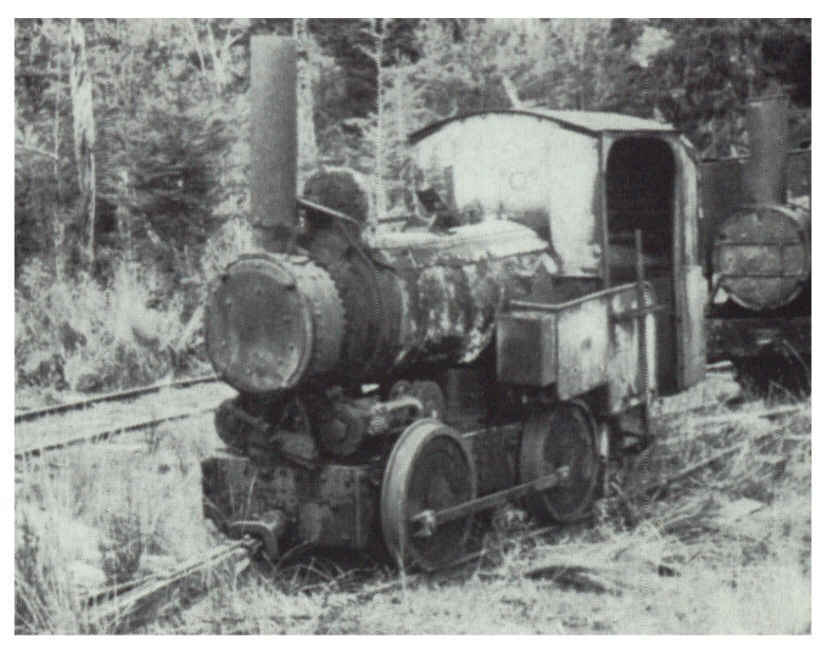
Abandoned Gibbons & Harris locomotive at Jack Bros. mill at Bell Hill

Gibbons & Harris were manufacturers of narrow gauge geared steam locomotives between 1905 and 1912 in Auckland, New Zealand.

== History ==
The steam engines of these locomotives were based on the design of those used for winches of ships, as known to Gibbons & Harris from conducting a lot of ship repair work. The boilers were purchased from other engineering companies manufactured. The locomotive had an average life expectance of 25 years.

== Locomotive #1, 1905 ==
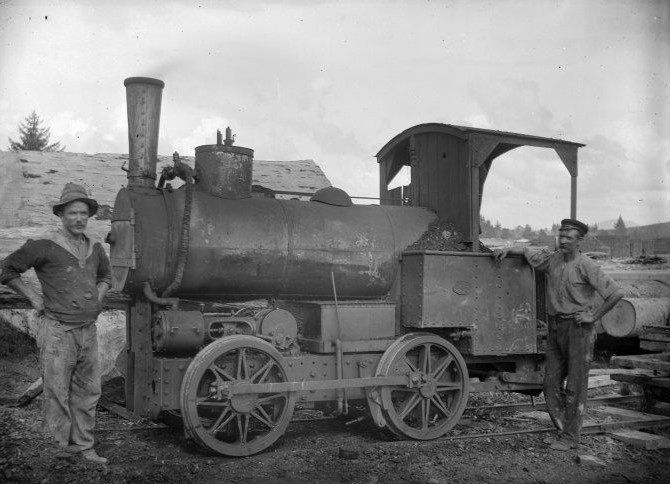
Locomotive #1 at Christie's Mill, Hikurangi, an R.P. Gibbons operation in Northland, 1911

0-4-0T locomotive #1 was the first locomotive built by Gibbons & Harris for Robert Pearce Gibbons, a brother of one of the founders, and a well-known Northland contractor and saw mill owner. The locomotive had horizontal cylinders underneath the smokebox and was driven through spur gears to the front axle. The drive was taken to the rear axle by means of a pair of coupling rods.

=== Technical data ===
- Gauge: 3 foot 6 inches (1,067 mm)
- Length: 12 foot 11 inches (3,937 mm)
- Wheelbase: 4 foot 9 inches (1,448 mm)
- Weight: 6 tonnes
- Boiler pressure: 120 pounds per square inch (8.3 bar)
- Cylinders: 6 by 6 inches (152 mm × 152 mm)
- Wheel diameter 30 inches (762 mm)

== Locomotive #3, 1905 ==
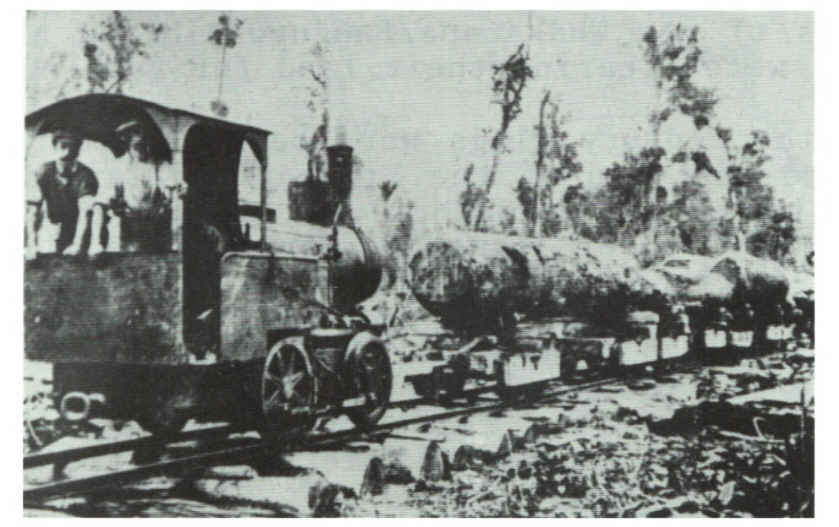
Locomotive #3 of J. Trounson at Tutāmoe (Upper Awakino Valley) 1911-14

0-4-0T locomotive #3 was a small geared 4-wheeler. It weighed about 6 tonnes. The two-cylinder engine was mounted horizontally underneath the smoke box and was connected by spur gears to the front axle. Side rods coupled the front and rear drive wheels.

=== Technical data ===
- Gauge: 3 foot 6 inches (1,067 mm)
- Length: 12 foot 11 inches (3,937 mm)
- Wheelbase: 4 foot 9 inches (1,448 mm)
- Weight: 6 tonnes
- Boiler pressure: 120 pounds per square inch (8.3 bar)
- Cylinders: 6 by 6 inches (152 mm × 152 mm)
- Wheel diameter 30 inches (762 mm)
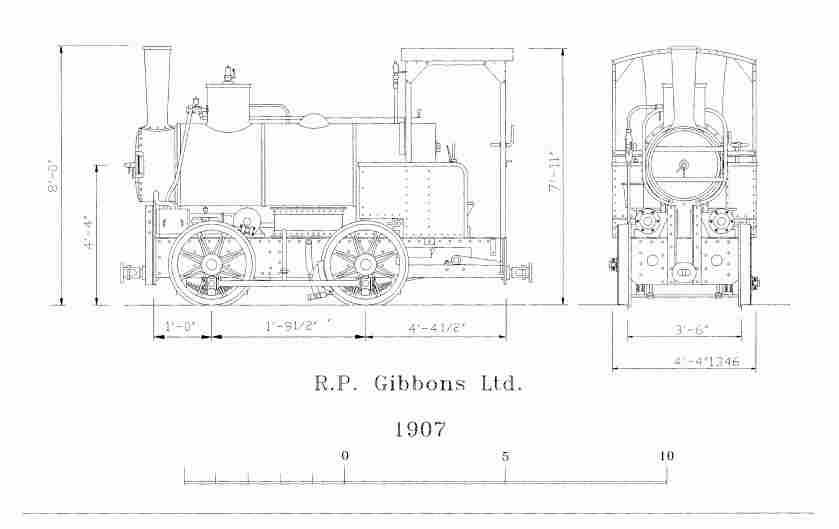
#3 of R.P. Gibbons, 1907

== Locomotive #5, 1912 ==
0-4-0T locomotive #5 was a slightly longer geared 4-wheeler used by R.P. Gibbons. It is undergoing restoration at Te Aroha Mountain Railway, Te Aroha for eventual operation on a scenic bush tramway.

=== Technical data ===
- Gauge: 3 foot 6 inches (1,067 mm)
- Length: 15 foot 3 1/2 inches (4,661 mm)
- Wheelbase: 4 foot 9 inches (1,448 mm)
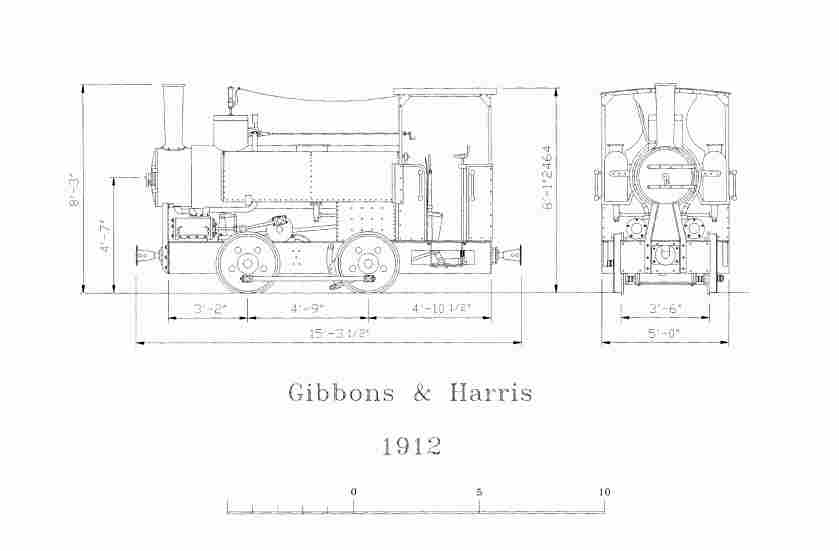
#5 of R.P. Gibbons, 1912
