= Wilmarth =

Wilmarth is a surname. Notable people with the surname include:

- Anna Wilmarth Ickes (1873–1935), American politician and activist
- Christopher Wilmarth (1943–1987), American sculptor
- Dick Wilmarth (died 2018), American miner and dog racer
- Lemuel Wilmarth (1835–1918), American painter
- William H. Wilmarth (1904–1999), American sound engineer
