= Pakistan CLP class locomotive =

CLP class
Type and origin
- Builder: Clyde Engineering, Sydney
- Serial number: ML3-1 - ML3-9
- Model: Electro-Motive Diesel ML3
- Build date: 1955
- Total produced: 9
Specifications
- Configuration
  - UIC: Co-Co
- Length: 18.90 metres
- Loco weight: 111.8 tonnes
- Fuel type: Diesel
- Fuel capacity: 5,891 litres
- Prime mover: EMD 567BC
Performance figures
- Power output: 1,119 kW (1,501 hp)
Career
- Numbers: 2101 - 2109
- Axle load class: 19.3 tonnes
- Withdrawn: 1984/85

The Pakistan CLP class locomotive was a class of diesel locomotives operated by Pakistan Railways between 1955 and 1985.

== History ==
In 1953, the Government of Australia funded the construction of nine Electro-Motive Diesel ML3 diesel locomotives by Clyde Engineering, Sydney for the Pakistan Railways under the Colombo Plan. They were derived from Commonwealth Railways GM class. All were withdrawn in 1984/85.

== Class list ==
Number	Serial number	Name
2101	ML3-1	Canberra
2102	ML3-2	Melbourne
2103	ML3-3	Adelaide
2104	ML3-4	Brisbane
2105	ML3-5	Perth
2106	ML3-6	Sydney
2107	ML3-7	Newcastle
2108	ML3-8	Hobart
2109	ML3-9	Geelong
