= Ernst Wiener Co., New York =

American locomotive manufacture

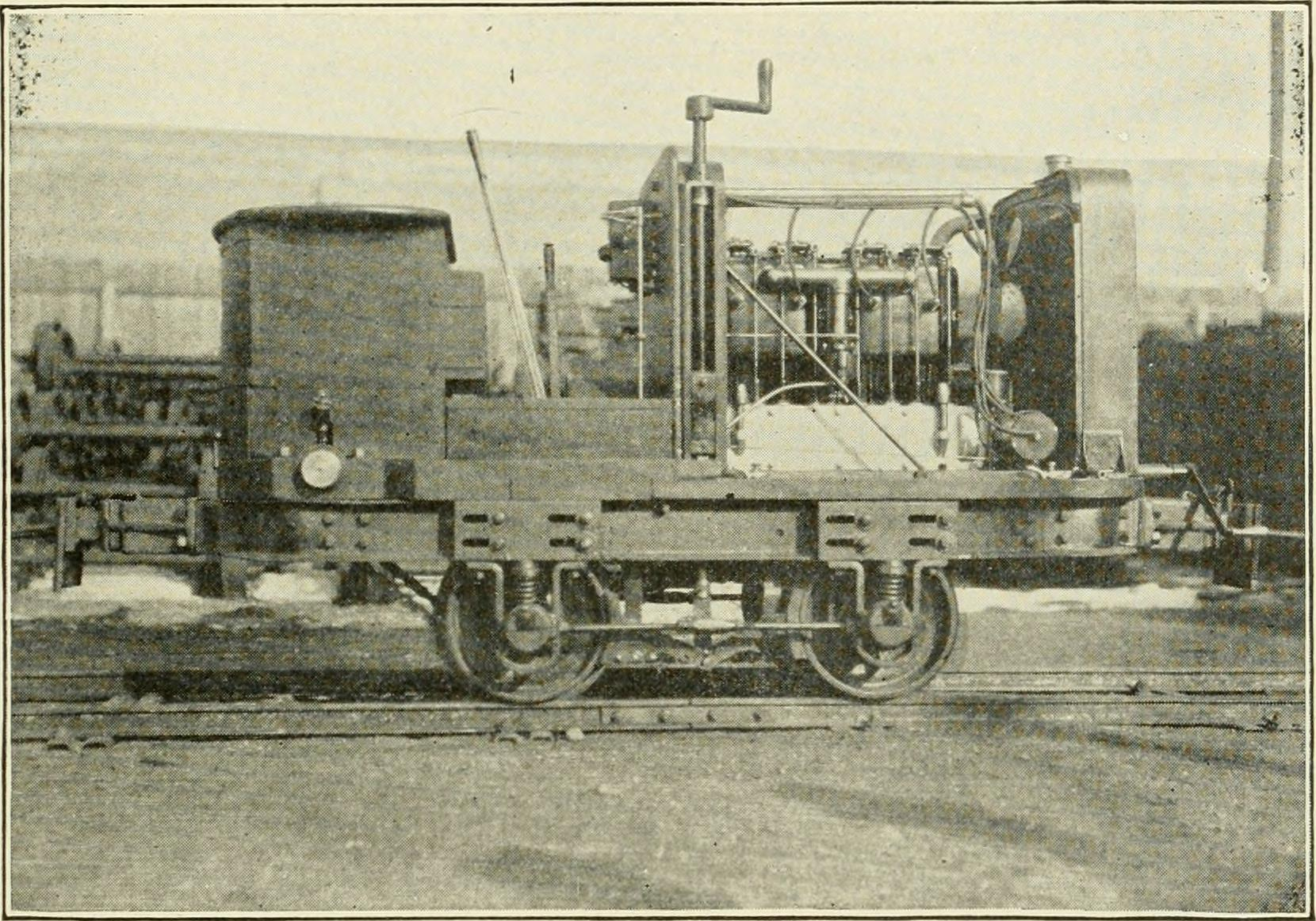
Gasoline industrial locomotive by Ernst Wiener Co., New York

Ernst Wiener Co., New York was an American locomotive manufacturer.

== Products ==
Ernst Wiener Co., New York built for instance a gasoline locomotive designed to haul ten loaded cars (tonnage 25), at a speed of eight to twelve miles an hour (13 to 20 km/h). It had a four cylinder, water cooled, four-cycle, gasoline engine, with cylinders cast in pairs and standing vertically. Ignition was provided by the storage battery and magnetic type, arranged for two sets of spark plugs. A radiator of the automobile type was at the front of the locomotive.
