= Jones, Turner and Evans =

Jones, Turner and Evans was a locomotive manufacturer in Newton-le-Willows, England from 1837, known as Jones and Potts between 1844 and 1852.

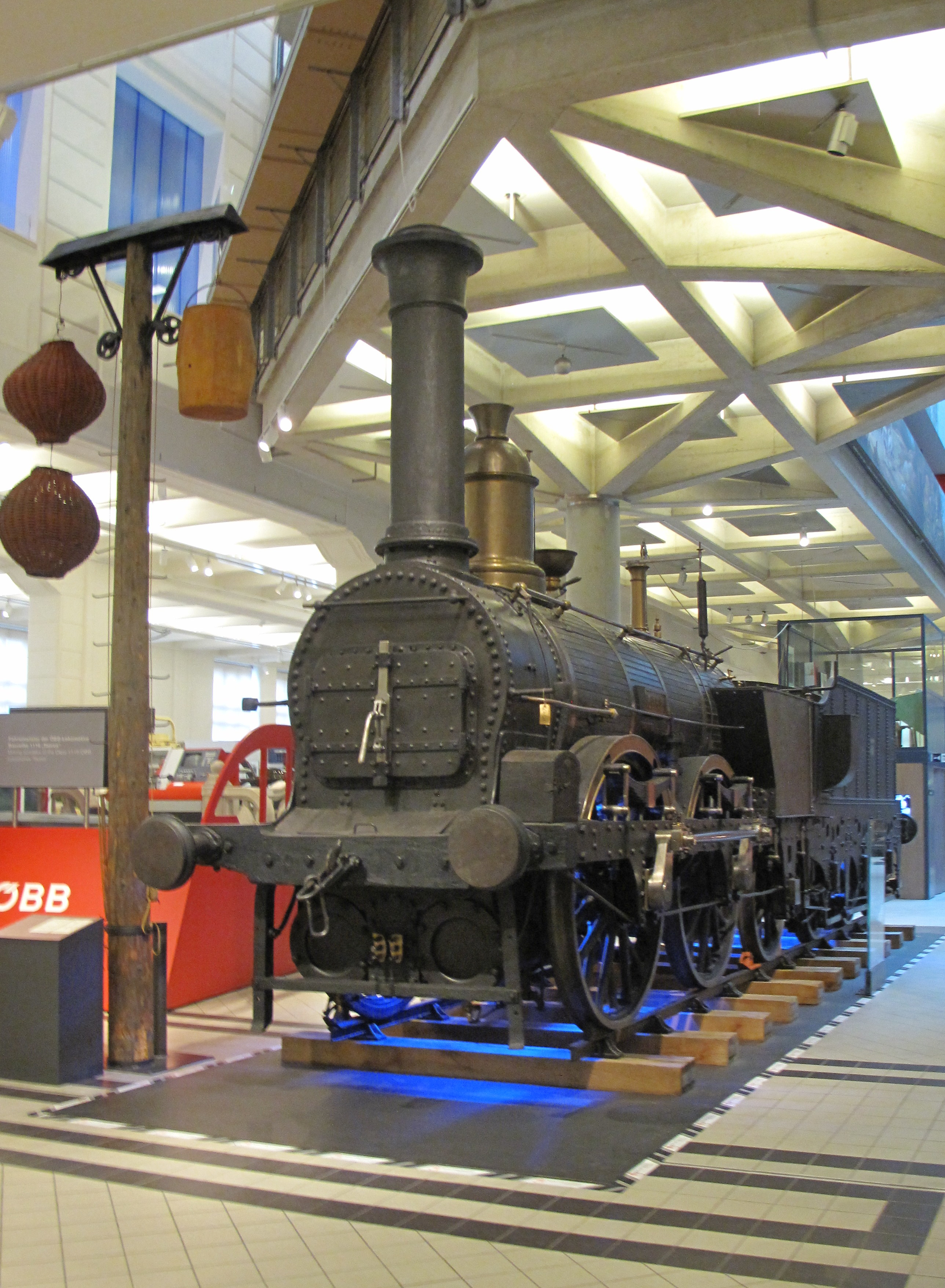
Ajax preserved at the Technisches Museum Wien

== Jones, Turner and Evans ==
The company opened in 1837 with subcontracts from Edward Bury and Robert Stephenson. They provided locomotives for the North Union Railway and the Midland Counties Railway (MCR), the latter all 2-2-2 with 5 ft 6 in (1.68 m) diameter driving wheels, and 12 in × 18 in (300 mm × 460 mm) cylinders. In 1840, they built two four-coupled 0-4-2s for the MCR. Further orders included engines for the Great Northern Railway, London and Brighton Railway and the Grand Junction Railway. They also supplied six broad gauge engines for the Great Western Railway, the first of the class being Firefly. In 1841 built four for the Eastern Counties Railway.

Also in 1841 they exported two 0-4-2 locomotives to Austria: Minotaurus and Ajax. Ajax is now the oldest preserved steam locomotive in mainland Europe. It was built for the inauguration of the Kaiser Ferdinands-Nordbahn in 1837. Originally built to transport goods it was, due to its large wheels and capability for high speeds, used for passenger services also. In 1874 it was withdrawn from service but not scrapped. From 1897 Ajax' was stored at the Austrian Railway Museum. In 1908 on the occasion of the 70th anniversary of the Kaiser Ferdinands-Nordbahn it was restored and shortly afterwards transferred to the Techisches Museum in Vienna, where it is still on display.

== Jones and Potts ==
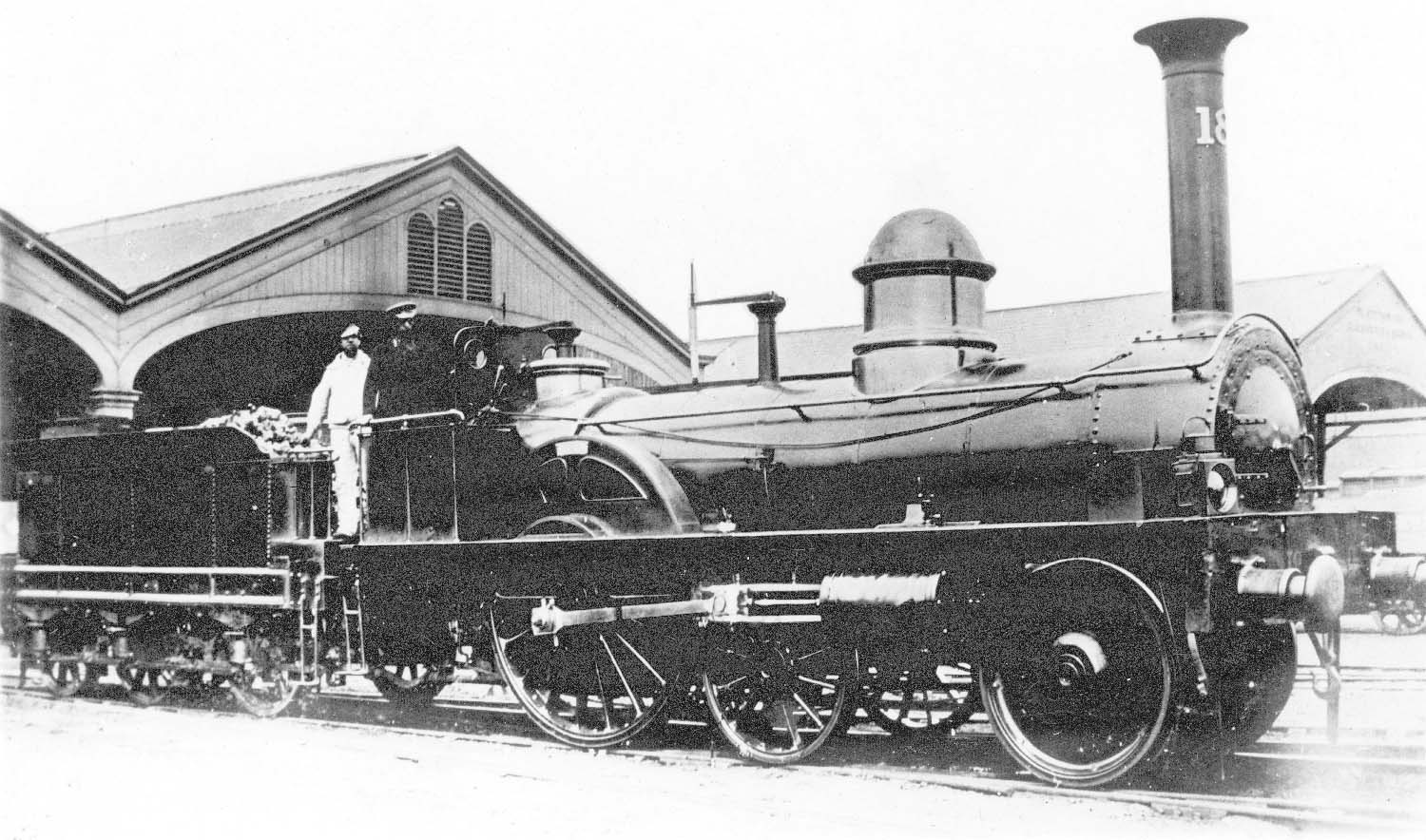
LNWR Stephenson patent long boiler 2+2-2-0 No 189 at Curzon Street, Birmingham, circa 1859. One of a class of ten supplied to the London and North Western Railway (Southern Division) by Jones and Potts in 1847-1848: one (no. 175) bought by the LNWR (S. Div.) ready-made, possibly built 1846, and nine ordered by the Chester and Holyhead Railway, but delivered to the LNWR (S. Div.) in 1847-48 as nos. 182-190.

After the initial railway boom, by 1844, orders were becoming slack and Jones formed a partnership with Arthur Potts, renaming the company Jones and Potts. Mr. Potts was instrumental in securing many more orders, particularly from the Eastern Counties Railway.

Two 0-6-0 long-boilered freight locomotives, No. 36 and 37 Bristol and Hercules, were supplied to the Birmingham and Gloucester Railway in June 1844. On Midland Railway takeover they were renumbered 222 and 223 and rebuilt around 1855 as Well tanks and assigned to banking duties on the Lickey Incline.

=== Locomotive designs ===
By 1850, the design of most of the locos was to Alexander Allan's pattern, with outside cylinders, and the long-boiler 4-2-0 popularised by Robert Stephenson. As a result, they had a very rough ride and derailed frequently. They also built five 0-6-0 engines for the Scottish lines, which, however were converted to 0-4-2. Seven 2-2-2 well tank engines were provided to the London and Blackwall Railway which served for many years.

=== Closure ===
Business tailed off again, and the company closed down in 1852. The works were leased by the London and North Western Railway, who then bought it outright in 1860, forming the nucleus of the Earlestown railway works.

== John Jones and Son ==
One partner, John Jones, however carried on as John Jones and Son with a factory in Liverpool to continue building locomotives, until 1863. The firm continued beyond his death in 1866, making marine boilers and marine steam engines in the St George's Engine Works. In adverts the firm claimed to have been established in 1832, which is when John Jones dissolved his partnership with William Yates at the Newton-le-Willows Viaduct Foundry. By 1900 the firm was building ships at their yard in Tranmere Bay, such as the steam ferries Lily and Rose built for Wallasey corporation in 1900.

In December 1900, noting the decline in shipbuilding in the Mersey area, it was said that Laird Brothers Ltd and John Jones and Sons were the only 2 remaining firms who are in any sense producers of new shipping. During 1900 Messrs John Jones & Sons (of Liverpool and Tranmere) had produced 13 small vessels with an aggregate tonnage of 2802 tons. The ship building facility appears to have been sold to the Tranmere Bay Development Company (formed by Laird Brothers at the end of 1902), but the production of engines at the St George's Engine Works continued.

As examples of their production, in 1872 Messrs John Jones & Sons built the 80 nominal HP engines for two screw steamers, Miguel Saenz and Moratin.

In 1894 they are noted as producing the boilers for the Dublin Steam Packet "Liverpool" - at 80 tons the largest boilers ever made in Liverpool.

Messrs John Jones & Sons of Liverpool built the Eastham Ferry paddle steamers Ruby and Pearl in 1897 and the Sapphire in 1898. These operated until 1929 and were the last paddle steamers on the Mersey.

In Lloyd's List for 1901 the company is referred to as Messrs John Jones & Sons of Tranmere, and production for 1901 was 12 vessels aggregating 4745 tons.

The twin-screw steam tug 'Seti', launched by the Tranmere Bay Development company on 30 April 1904, was then to have its engines and boiler installed by John Jones & Bros at their St George's works.
