= LNWR George the Fifth class 2013 Prince George =

British steam locomotive

LNWR George the Fifth Class 2013 Prince George
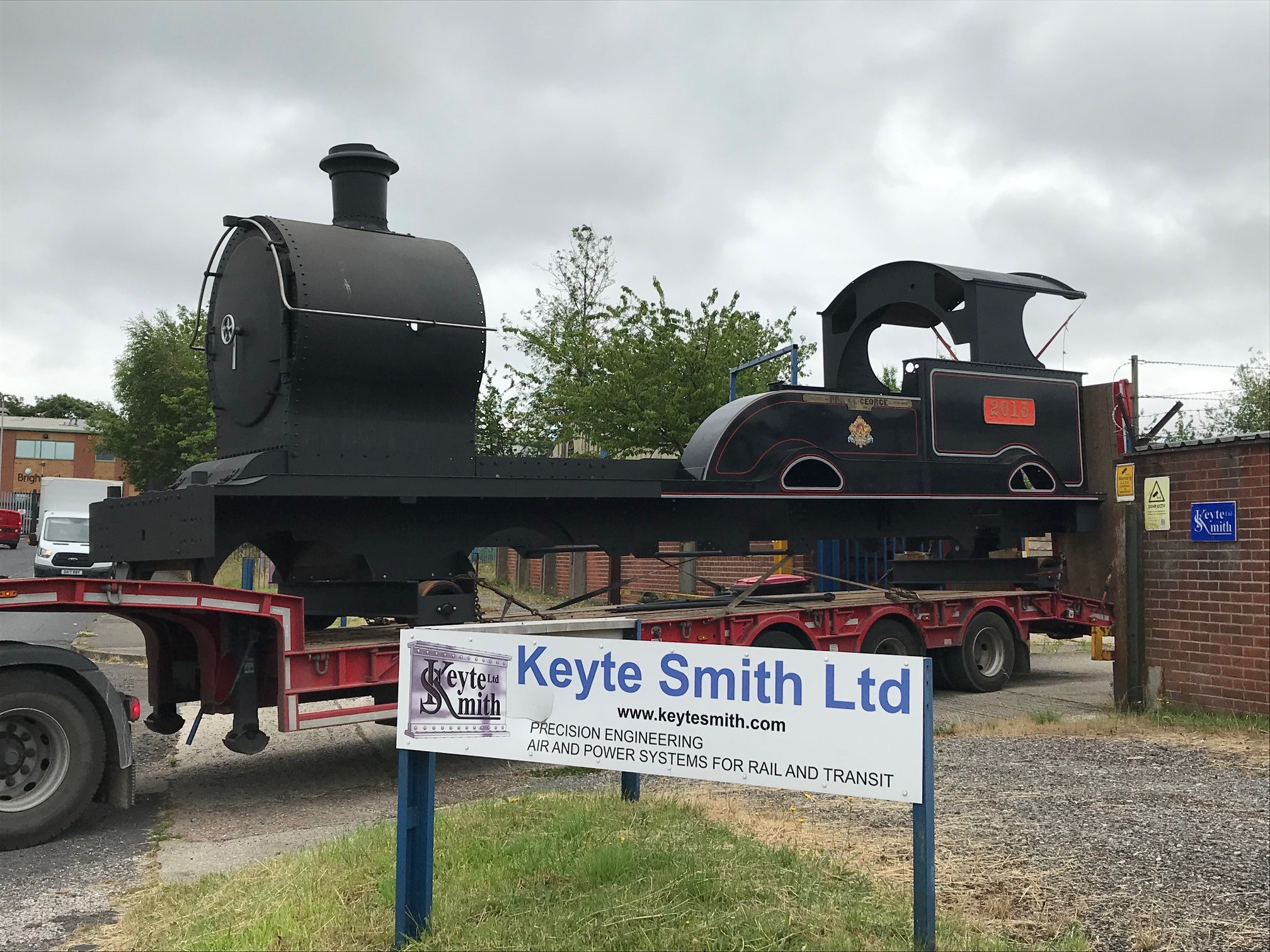
Type and origin
- Power type: Steam
- Designer: Charles Bowen Cooke
- Builder: LNWR George the Fifth Steam Locomotive Trust
Specifications
- Configuration
  - Whyte: 4-4-0
  - UIC: 2′B h2
- Gauge: 4 ft 8 1/2 in (1,435 mm)
- Leading dia.: 3 ft 3 in (0.991 m)
- Driver dia.: 6 ft 9 in (2.057 m)
- Loco weight: 59.85 long tons (60.81 t)
- Boiler pressure: 175 psi (1.21 MPa)
- Heating surface: 1,849 sq ft (171.8 m^{2})
- Superheater: Schmidt
- Cylinders: Two
- Cylinder size: 20.5 in × 26 in (521 mm × 660 mm) or 20 1/2 in × 26 in (521 mm × 660 mm)
- Valve gear: Joy
Performance figures
- Tractive effort: 20,640 lbf (91.8 kN)
Career
- Numbers: 2013
- Official name: Prince George
- Disposition: Under Construction

The LNWR George the Fifth class 2013 Prince George is a full size LNWR George the Fifth Class steam locomotive under construction by the LNWR George the Fifth Steam Locomotive Trust, a Registered Charity. The 'George' is a classic example of an LNWR express engine of which only one example (790 Hardwicke of the "Improved Precedent" Class) survived into preservation. Therefore, the Trust is progressing towards 'making good this gap', and the new George is currently being contractors with much of the work carried out by Keyte Smith Ltd of Kirkby in Ashfield

The Trust relies upon donations and regular contributions in order to fund the project. The Trust's short-term aims are currently focused building its locomotive, strengthening its team and increasing the number of subscribers and active donors.

In July 2013 the Trust approached the then Duke of Cambridge and Duchess of Cambridge to name their locomotive after their new-born son Prince George. The Duke and Duchess accepted, and the locomotive was given the number '2013', the year of his birth, and named 'Prince George' on 22 July 2014, in honour of his first birthday.

The part build locomotive has been exhibited at [[Crewe Heritage Centre]] during the 2023 and 2024 seasons, and its front end decorated with flag and bunting to mark Prince George's 12th birthday a few days earlier, was shown at the Rail 200 show at The Greatest Gathering, when over 40,000 visitors were recorded over three days. It is now at a private site in Kirkby in Ashfield.

== About the Class ==
They were essentially superheated versions of the LNWR Whale Precursor Class. At the same time as the first ten were built, similar non-superheated but otherwise identical Queen Mary Class engines were also built, to compare performance and costs. As the George the Fifth Class consumed 25% less coal all the Queen Mary Class were converted to George the Fifth standard.

As well as being more economical in coal, the George the Fifth Class was able to develop over 1200HP, creating a sensation amongst railway observers at the time.

Many Precursors were converted at overhauls to conform with the George specification; the only visual difference being the Splashers over the driving wheels.

Due to the Civil Engineer's veto of the planned 4-6-0 only a year after the introduction of the George the Fifth, the class remained on top link duties much longer than was planned. Even when the 4-6-0 did appear in 1913 it was in limited numbers until 1920. Thus the Class remained as possibly the hardest worked locomotive for its size for many years. As a result, its history is well documented in contemporary professional records such as are held in the archives of the Institution of Mechanical Engineers, as well as enthusiast publications. Most of the LNWR drawings for the class are held at the National Railway Museum, and the LNWR Society also has a very useful archive. There are many more recent reference books in the public domain which can be consulted.

Once bigger locomotives were available in large numbers the Class was redeployed to less onerous main line duties, then ending up on branch lines before final elimination of the last one in 1949.

Many books have been written about The "George" and related classes of locomotives. Possibly the best one for the general reader is The Precursor Family by O. S. Nock.

== Project launch ==
The Trust was created in 2012 undertaking detailed evaluations and planning, whilst building up valuable information and drawings. Its first item of construction was the smokebox door. After receiving permission for the name and number the project was officially launched on 22 July 2014 with the unveiling of a fully painted and lined out, cabside and splasher assembly complete with number and name plates; this took place at Quorn on the Great Central Railway Loughborough.

== Construction ==
Following the parts made for the official launch of the project, work continued with manufacture of the smokebox. Traditional hot rivets were used for aesthetic reasons; in general the Trust uses present-day technology rather than traditional techniques. Elements of the footplating were made, and frame plate profiles were cut. After a period of slow progress, the project was enlivened by the offer of display space at Crewe Heritage Centre. The main frame plates were machined, and temporarily assembled with other existing parts and mounted on fork truck wheels for ease of movement. It was displayed in this state for the 2023 and 2024 seasons.

While on display design and manufacture continued. Large parts were the cast motion plate and frame stretcher, also the heavy welded dragbox and buffer brackets along with many smaller parts. When the locomotive left Crewe for its present site the display assembly was dismantled and the frames reassembled with the new, permanent parts acquired. The frames are now assembled, and lined up ready to be fitted with running plates etc. Much of the platework already exists but a significant amount will require to manufactured.

The plan for 2026 is to have cab, splashers, running plates and smokebox fitted on the frames, followed by design and manufacture of the 2-tonne cylinder block.

The Construction Timeline is recorded on the Trust's website.

The Trust is a member of the Main Line Steam Builders' Group, sharing information and ideas, with Ricardo Rail, the Approvals body advising on the processes for Approval to run on British main lines.

== Project future ==
It will cost between £2 and £2.5 million to complete Prince George. Funds are being raised through private donation and sponsorship of parts. Raising the necessary capital is done through having a presence at events, giving talks and generating publicity through the media.
