= LNWR Prince of Wales Tank Class =

LNWR 2665 Class "5ft 6in Tank (Superheated)"
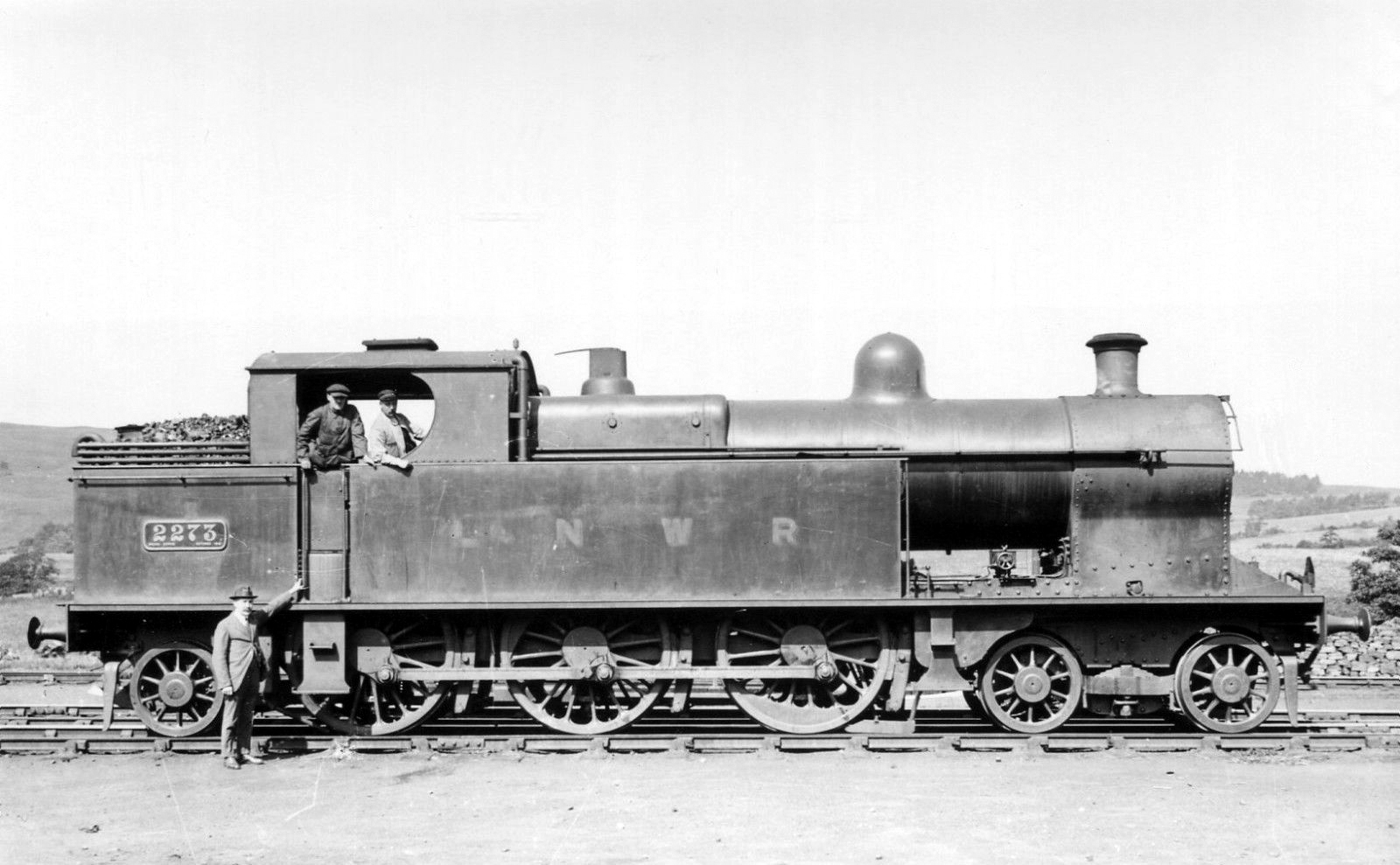
- No. 2273
Type and origin
- Power type: Steam
- Designer: Charles Bowen Cooke
- Builder: LNWR Crewe Works
- Serial number: 4950–69, 5080–96, 5347–56
- Model: 1910–1916
- Total produced: 47
Specifications
- Configuration
  - Whyte: 4-6-2T
  - UIC: 2′C1 n2t
- Gauge: 4 ft 8 1/2 in (1,435 mm)
- Leading dia.: 3 ft 3 in (0.991 m)
- Driver dia.: 5 ft 8 1/2 in (1.740 m)
- Trailing dia.: 3 ft 3 in (0.991 m)
- Loco weight: 78 long tons (79 t)
- Boiler pressure: 175 lbf/in^{2} (1.21 MPa)
- Heating surface: Saturated: 1,475 sq ft (137.0 m^{2}); Superheated: 1,330 sq ft (124 m^{2})
- Cylinders: Two
- Cylinder size: Saturated: 18 1/2 in × 26 in (470 mm × 660 mm); Superheated: 20 in × 26 in (508 mm × 660 mm)
- Valve gear: Joy
- Valve type: Piston valves
Career
- Operators: London and North Western Railway; London, Midland and Scottish Railway
- Class: 5ft 6in Tank (Superheated)
- Power class: LMS: 4P
- Nicknames: Prince of Wales Tank
- Withdrawn: 1935–1941
- Disposition: All scrapped

The London and North Western Railway (LNWR) Prince of Wales Tank Class was a Pacific tank engine version of the Prince of Wales Class 4-6-0 steam locomotive.

== History ==
Bowen-Cooke's predecessor George Whale had built 50 related Precursor Tank Class 4-4-2 engines. In terms of familial relationships, Prince of Wales Tank was both a superheated and extended version of the Precursor Tank, and a version of the Prince of Wales Class 4-6-0 steam locomotive with side tanks and a bunker which necessitated an extension to the frames and trailing pony truck. They were used on suburban services out of Euston station and from an early date also used on passenger services between Shrewsbury and Swansea (Victoria) over the steeply-graded Central Wales line, a journey of some 120 mi (190 km).

The LNWR built 47 of the superheated tanks between 1910 and 1916 under Charles Bowen-Cooke.

== LMS service ==
All passed onto LMS ownership on the 1923 grouping and were renumbered 6950–6996 with the power classification 4P. Withdrawals started in 1935, their replacements being Class 4 2-6-4T designs by Fowler and Stanier. All were withdrawn and scrapped by 1941.

== Fleet list ==
Table of locomotives
| LNWR No. | Crewe Works No. | Build date | Superheated | LMS No. | Withdrawn | Notes |
|---|---|---|---|---|---|---|
| 2665 | 4950 | Dec 1910 | May 1913 | 6950 | Sep 1936 | |
| 2666 | 4951 | Dec 1910 | Feb 1915 | 6951 | Jan 1936 | |
| 2667 | 4952 | Jan 1911 | from new | 6952 | Jul 1937 | |
| 2668 | 4953 | Jan 1911 | from new | 6953 | Oct 1936 | |
| 2669 | 4954 | Feb 1911 | from new | 6954 | Sep 1936 | |
| 2670 | 4955 | Feb 1911 | from new | 6955 | Sep 1936 | |
| 217 | 4956 | Feb 1911 | from new | 6956 | Apr 1938 | |
| 1183 | 4957 | Feb 1911 | from new | 6957 | Dec 1937 | |
| 1366 | 4958 | Feb 1911 | from new | 6958 | Feb 1936 | |
| 1797 | 4959 | Feb 1911 | from new | 6959 | Mar 1938 | |
| 632 | 4960 | Mar 1911 | May 1913 | 6977 | Mar 1936 | |
| 1186 | 4961 | Mar 1911 | Mar 1914 | 6982 | Mar 1937 | |
| 1416 | 4962 | Mar 1911 | Aug 1916 | 6986 | Jan 1937 | |
| 1533 | 4963 | Mar 1911 | Jun 1913 | 6978 | Mar 1937 | |
| 1638 | 4964 | Mar 1911 | Apr 1915 | 6985 | Apr 1937 | |
| 1688 | 4965 | Mar 1911 | Jun 1913 | 6979 | Apr 1941 | |
| 1692 | 4966 | Apr 1911 | Jan 1915 | 6984 | Apr 1936 | |
| 1710 | 4967 | Apr 1911 | Jul 1914 | 6983 | Feb 1937 | |
| 1728 | 4968 | Apr 1911 | Jul 1913 | 6980 | Mar 1938 | |
| 1734 | 4969 | Apr 1911 | Nov 1913 | 6981 | Apr 1936 | |
| 91 | 5080 | Jul 1912 | from new | 6960 | Feb 1939 | |
| 375 | 5081 | Jul 1912 | from new | 6961 | Feb 1938 | |
| 376 | 5082 | Jul 1912 | from new | 6962 | Jan 1937 | |
| 716 | 5083 | Jul 1912 | from new | 6963 | Mar 1936 | |
| 915 | 5084 | Aug 1912 | from new | 6964 | Jul 1937 | |
| 932 | 5085 | Aug 1912 | from new | 6965 | Dec 1937 | |
| 944 | 5086 | Aug 1912 | from new | 6966 | Nov 1937 | |
| 962 | 5087 | Aug 1912 | from new | 6970 | Apr 1936 | |
| 858 | 5088 | Aug 1912 | from new | 6969 | Jun 1937 | |
| 2004 | 5089 | Aug 1912 | from new | 6971 | Apr 1937 | |
| 327 | 5090 | Sep 1912 | from new | 6967 | Feb 1936 | |
| 704 | 5091 | Sep 1912 | from new | 6968 | Jul 1936 | |
| 841 | 5092 | Sep 1912 | from new | 6972 | Apr 1937 | |
| 963 | 5093 | Sep 1912 | from new | 6973 | Feb 1938 | |
| 1006 | 5094 | Sep 1912 | from new | 6974 | Sep 1936 | |
| 1021 | 5095 | Sep 1912 | from new | 6975 | Sep 1937 | |
| 1184 | 5096 | Oct 1912 | from new | 6976 | Feb 1936 | |
| 96 | 5347 | Sep 1916 | from new | 6987 | Dec 1936 | |
| 316 | 5348 | Sep 1916 | from new | 6988 | Dec 1936 | |
| 809 | 5349 | Sep 1916 | from new | 6989 | Aug 1937 | |
| 878 | 5350 | Oct 1916 | from new | 6990 | Mar 1936 | |
| 2098 | 5351 | Oct 1916 | from new | 6991 | Feb 1936 | |
| 2273 | 5352 | Oct 1916 | from new | 6992 | Jan 1937 | |
| 2292 | 5353 | Nov 1916 | from new | 6993 | Sep 1939 | |
| 2298 | 5354 | Nov 1916 | from new | 6994 | Feb 1936 | |
| 2384 | 5355 | Nov 1916 | from new | 6995 | Apr 1937 | |
| 2418 | 5356 | Nov 1916 | from new | 6996 | Sep 1937 | |
