= Super D (disambiguation) =

Super D is a 2004 EP by Ben Folds.

Super D may also refer to:

- Super D (cycling), a class of mountain bike race
- Various 0-8-0 steam locomotives of the London and North Western Railway:
  - LNWR Class G1
  - LNWR Class G2
  - LNWR Class G2A
- My Super D, Philippine TV series
- Super D, an American drugstore chain acquired by Walgreens Company
- super-d numbers are integers n such that d · n^{d} has a substring of d digits d.
