= LNWR 380 Class =

Class of locomotives, manufactured 1923–24

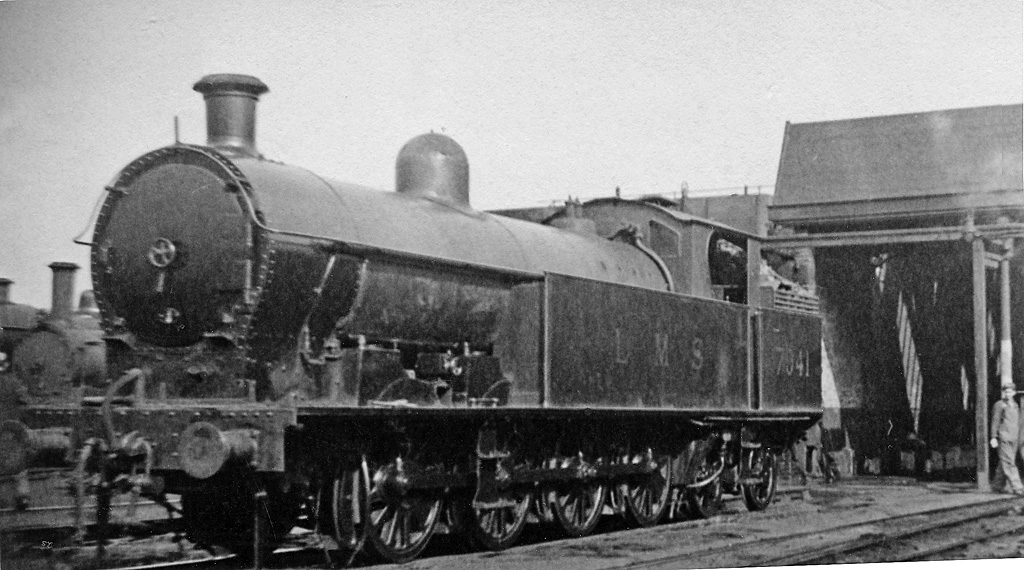
- No. 7941 at Swansea Paxton Street depot in 1946
Type and origin
- Power type: Steam
- Designer: H. P. M. Beames
- Build date: 1923–1924
- Total produced: 30
Specifications
- Configuration
  - Whyte: 0-8-4T
  - UIC: D′2 h2t
- Gauge: 4 ft 8 1/2 in (1,435 mm)
- Driver dia.: 4 ft 5 1/2 in (1.359 m)
- Loco weight: 88 long tons 0 cwt (197,100 lb or 89.4 t)
- Boiler pressure: 185 psi (1.28 MPa)
- Cylinder size: 20.5 in × 24 in (521 mm × 610 mm)
- Valve gear: Joy
- Valve type: Piston valves
Performance figures
- Tractive effort: 29,815 lbf (132.62 kN)
Career
- Operators: LNWR » LMS » BR
- Power class: LMS: 5F
- Withdrawn: 1944–1951
- Disposition: All scrapped

The LNWR 380 Class was a class of 0-8-4T steam tank locomotives designed by H. P. M. Beames. Although designed under the LNWR regime they appeared as LMS locomotives after the 1923 grouping. They were essentially an extended version of the 1185 Class 0-8-2T with a longer bunker, and were also related to the 0-8-0 freight engines. Their main area of work was to be in South Wales.

== Numbering ==
The first thirteen were given LNWR numbers when new, because the LMS numbering scheme had not yet been finalised. The last seventeen carried LMS numbers 7943–7959 from new, although the first two of these had been allotted LNWR numbers (which they never carried in service). The first thirteen were renumbered 7930–7942 between 1926 and 1928. The LMS gave them the power classification 5F. Withdrawal began in 1944. Fourteen survived into British Railways ownership in 1948 and were to be renumbered between 47930 and 47959 (i.e. the LMS numbers increased by 40000), but only two survived long enough to be renumbered 47931 and 47937, the last withdrawal occurring in 1951.
