= LNWR Class G2A =

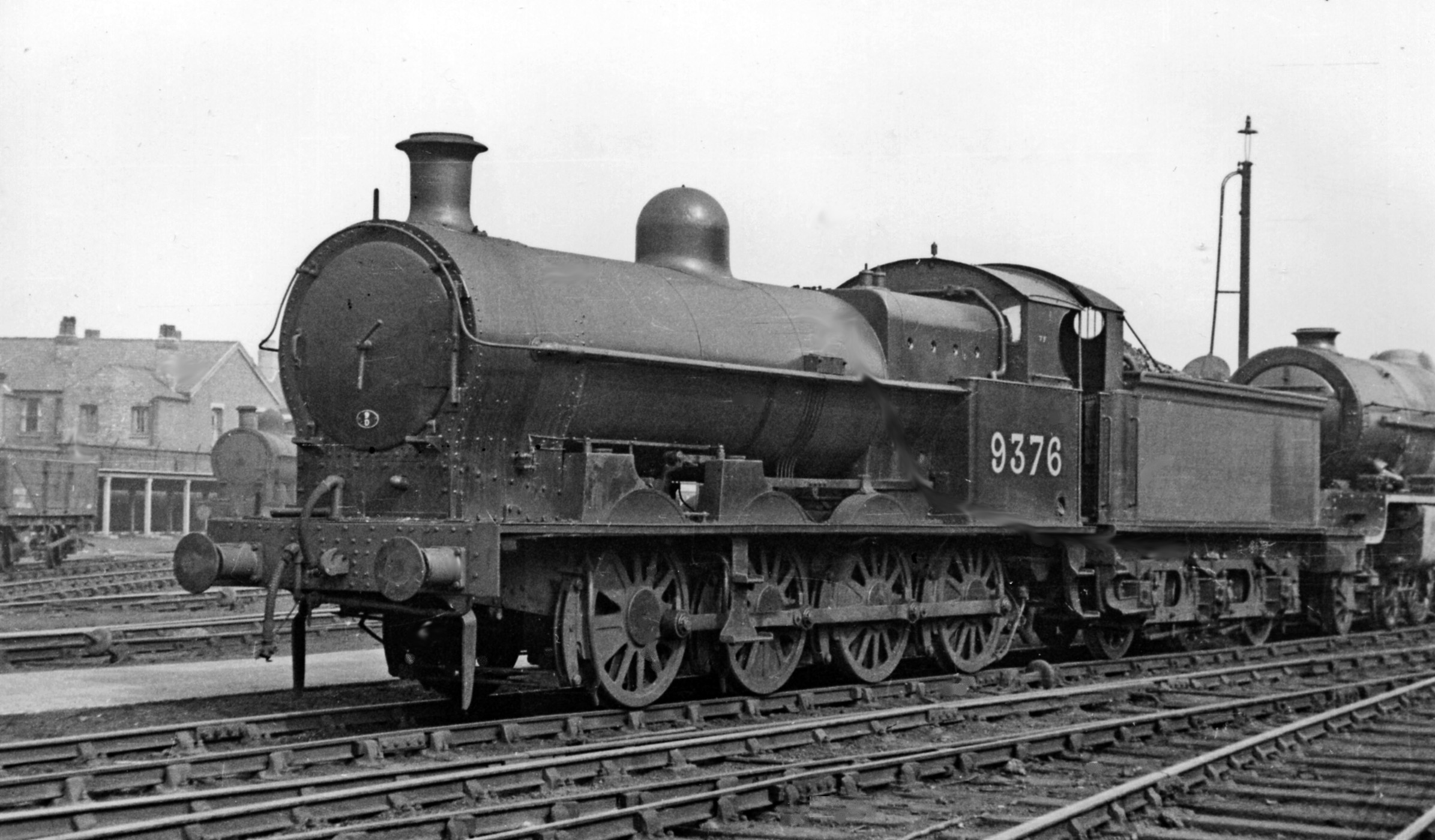
- Class G2A No. 9376 at Crewe, 2 May 1948
Type and origin
- Power type: Steam
- Designer: Charles Bowen Cooke
- Number rebuilt: 327 (from G1)
Specifications
- Configuration
  - Whyte: 0-8-0
  - UIC: D h2
- Gauge: 4 ft 8 1/2 in (1,435 mm)
- Driver dia.: 4 ft 5 1/2 in (1.359 m)
- Loco weight: 62 long tons 0 cwt (138,900 lb or 63 t)
- Fuel type: Coal
- Boiler pressure: 175 psi (1.21 MPa)
- Cylinders: Two, inside
- Cylinder size: 20 1/2 in × 24 in (521 mm × 610 mm)
- Valve type: Joy
Performance figures
- Tractive effort: 28,045 lbf (124.8 kN)
Career
- Operators: LNWR » LMS » BR
- Power class: BR: 7F
- Nicknames: Super D

The London and North Western Railway (LNWR) Class G2A was a class of 0-8-0 steam locomotives. They were upgraded from LNWR Class G1 principally by the fitting of a higher pressure boiler. Some of the G2As subsequently received lower pressure boilers on overhaul, taking them back into Class G1.

== Numbering ==
On nationalisation in 1948, British Railways (BR) received 320 G2As, thus making them the largest ex-LNWR class received by BR. They were numbered in the range 48893–49394 but the number series is not continuous because some numbers in the same range were given to G1 Class locomotives.

== Preservation ==
None were preserved, although a very similar LNWR Class G2 No. 49395 was.
