= Hackworth valve gear =

Type of locomotive valve gear

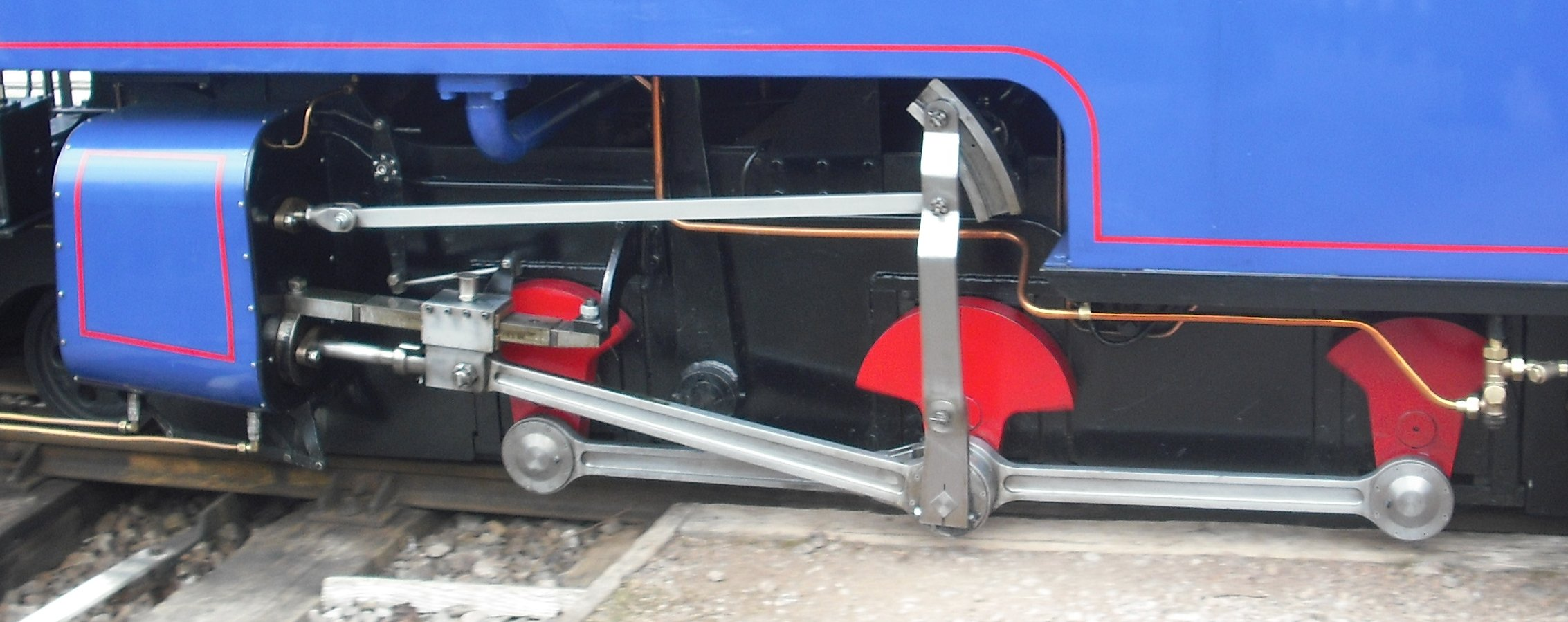
Hackworth valve gear on steam locomotive 'Lydia' at the Perrygrove Railway.

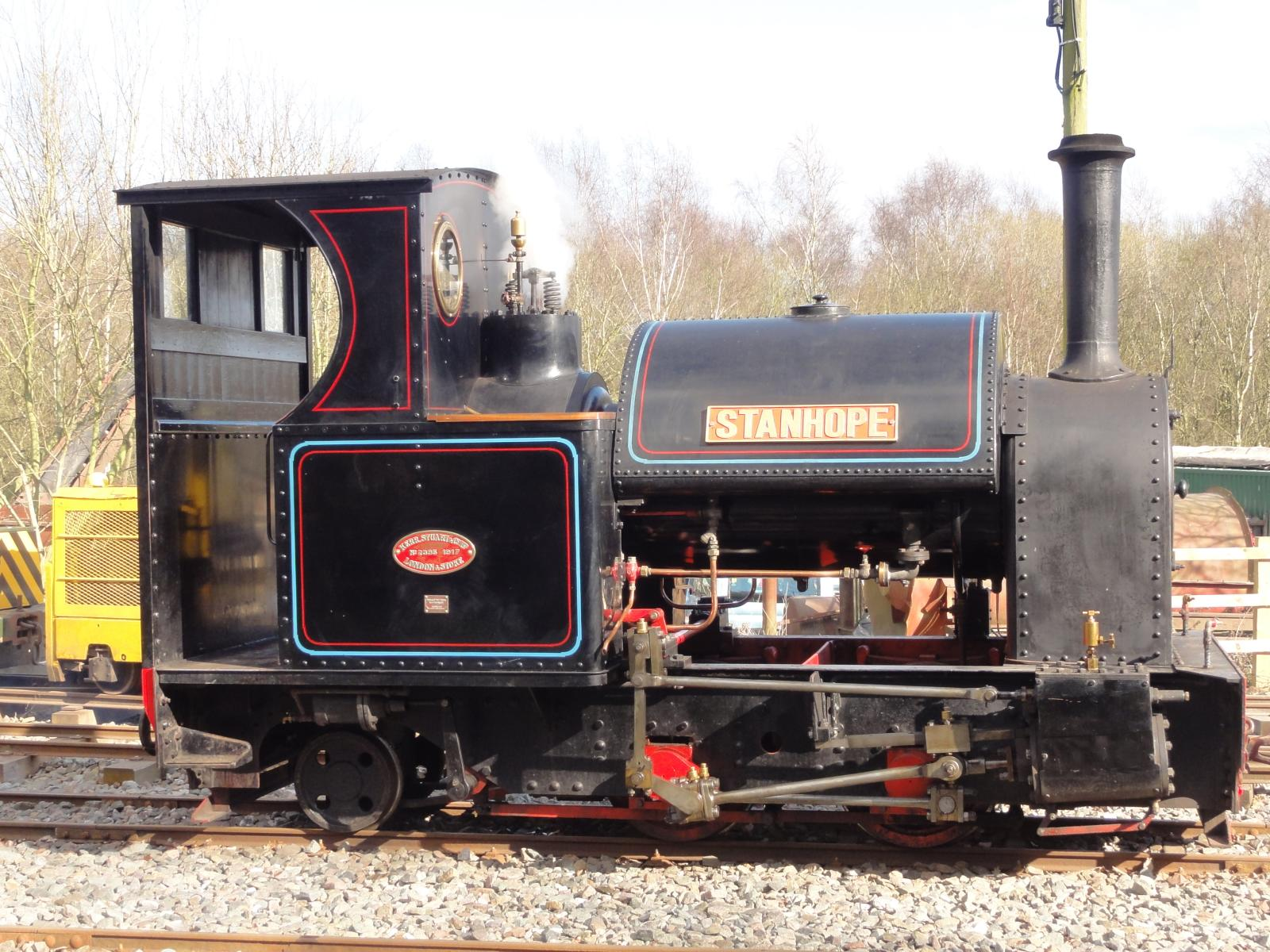
Hackworth valve gear on Apedale Valley Light Railway locomotive 'Stanhope'

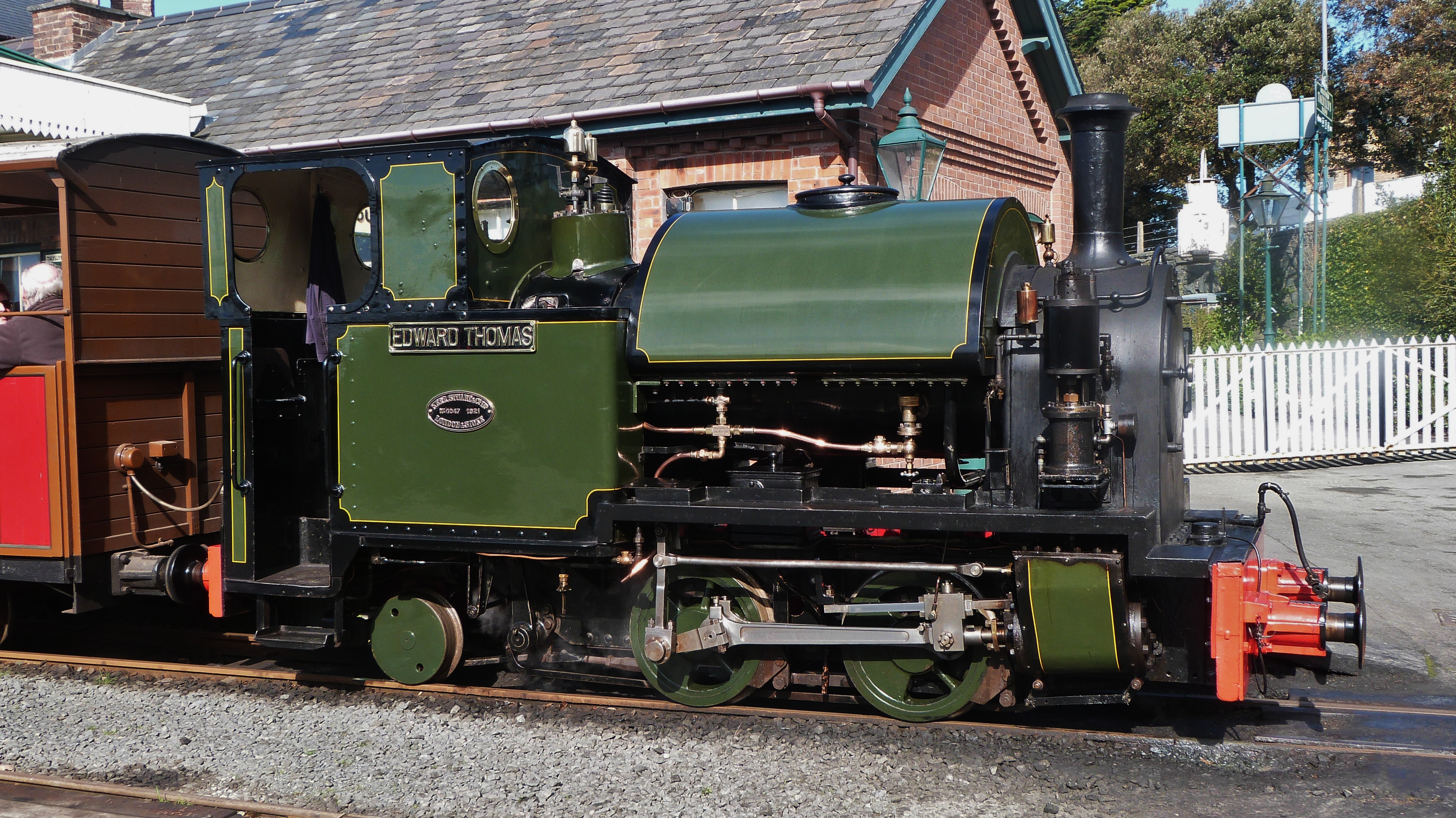
Hackworth valve gear on Tal-y-Llyn Railway locomotive 'Edward Thomas'

The Hackworth valve gear is a design of valve gear used to regulate the flow of steam to the pistons in steam engines. It is a radial gear, with an actuating lever driven from the crank. The drive may be taken directly from the crank or indirectly via a return crank (as in all pictures). The other end of the actuating lever is attached to a die block which slides in a slotted link. When the link is vertical, the engine is in mid-gear. Forward, reverse and cut-off adjustments are made by moving the link away from the vertical. The valve rod is pivoted to a point on the actuating lever.

== History ==
The gear was patented by John Wesley Hackworth (1820-1891), son of Timothy Hackworth, in 1859.

== Klug's valve gear ==
Hackworth valve gear was a precursor to Klug's valve gear, but it differs from the latter in that the eccentric rod's suspension point moves to-and-fro in a straight line by means of a die block sliding in a slotted guide.

== See also ==
- Joy valve gear - a design used extensively on the L&YR and LNWR in England, and elsewhere. A preserved example is LNWR G2a Class number 49395.
- Marshall valve gear - a modified Hackworth gear, patented in 1879 by Marshall, Sons & Co.
- Southern valve gear - Briefly popular in the United States around 1920. It combined elements of the Walschaerts and Baker patterns.
