= 0-8-4T =

Tank locomotive wheel arrangement

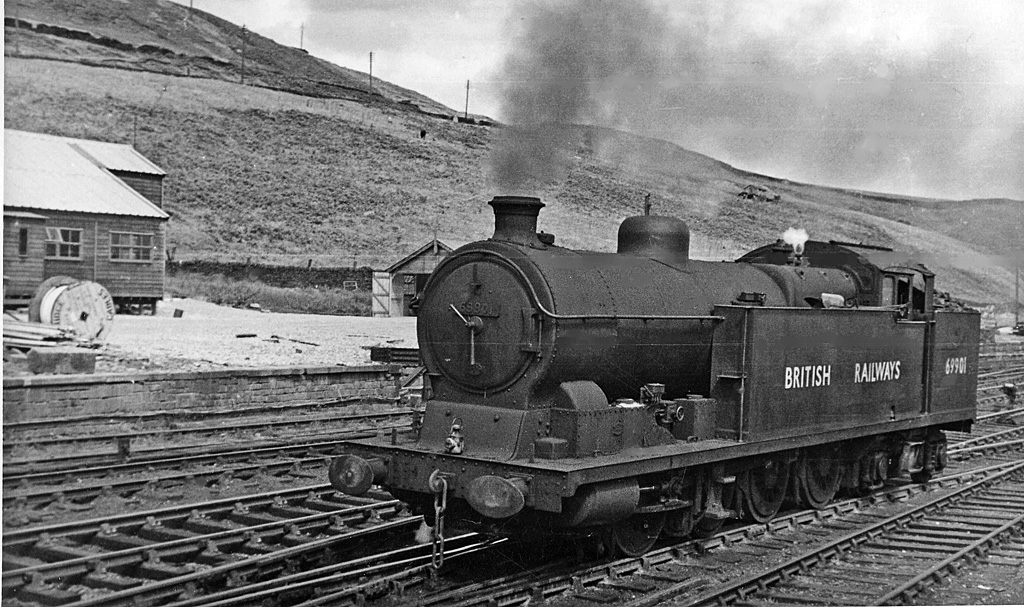
GCR Class 8H 69901 at Dunford Bridge on the Woodhead line in 1950

Under the Whyte notation for the classification of steam locomotives, 0-8-4 represents the wheel arrangement of no leading wheels, eight powered and coupled driving wheels on four axles, and four trailing wheels on two axles (usually in a trailing bogie).

== Equivalent classifications ==
Other equivalent classifications are:

- UIC classification: D2, D2' (also known as German classification and Italian classification)
- French classification: 042
- Turkish classification: 46
- Swiss classification: 4/6
- Russian classification: 0-4-2

== Examples ==
All examples of this wheel arrangement were tank locomotives; there are no 0-8-4 tender locomotives recorded.

=== India ===
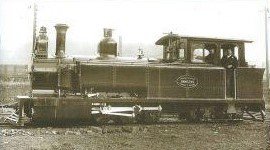
Barsi Light Railway A class 0-8-4T

The Barsi Light Railway had Kitson & Company build five A Class/"Hamilton Class" tank engines of this wheel arrangement to the design of famed engineer Everard Calthrop for running on their 2 ft 6 in (762 mm) line in 1896. These engines had Walschaerts valve gear and 160 psi boilers, they were all likely scrapped and replaced by diesels sometimes around the 1950s-1960s, though not much information on them has been found as of now.

=== United Kingdom ===
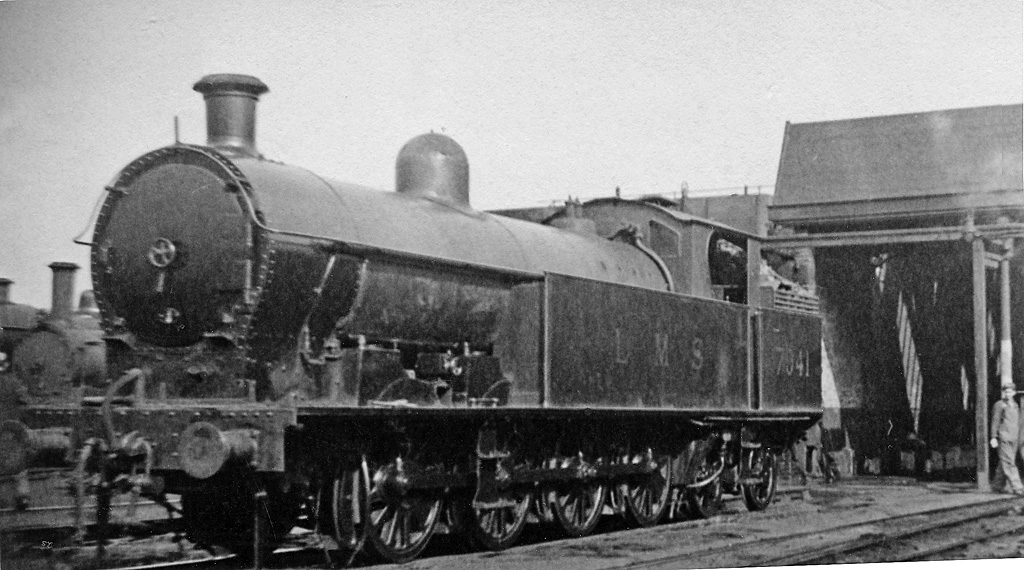
LNWR 380 Class 7941 at Swansea Paxton Street depot in 1946

Two separate classes were built in the UK, by two different railway companies. Both of these had their origins with an 0-8-0 tender design. Both classes were designed as powerful, but slow-speed, locomotives for heavy shunting. They did not require high speed or long range, so had no need for a leading truck or the greater coal capacity of a tender. Other than this though, they were quite distinct.

The first example was the Great Central Railway Class 8H of 1907. These were designed for hump shunting and so required high tractive effort, good adhesion and traction for starting from rest. Although developed from the 8A tender class, and having some interchangeable parts in their running gear, they also had three cylinders rather than two. The three cylinder tank locomotive was in fashion at this time, as a means of achieving good acceleration from rest, owing to their more even power delivery and the reduced risk of wheelslip. This three-cylindered pattern had begun with Holden's Decapod of 1902 and carried through into Worsdell and Raven's fast passenger tank locomotives of 4-6-2T and 4-4-4T layout for the North Eastern Railway in 1910 and 1913. Worsdell also designed a comparable heavy shunter of his own, the Class X, although this used the 4-8-0T layout with a leading bogie, rather than trailing.

The class was considered a success, although highly specialised, and developments were rebuilt and built new by the LNER. The rebuilt locomotive trialled a new outside-framed bogie, fitted with a booster engine, the LNER being one of the few UK railways to favour these. Two further locomotives were also built by the LNER. Six were built in total.

The second example was LNWR 380 Class. These were a simple stretched version of the inside-cylindered 0-8-2T 1185 Class, which had been derived from the LNWR's numerous 0-8-0 freight locomotives, with a larger coal bunker. The class was intended for both shunting, banking and as mineral engines for the heavy coal or iron train use in the South Wales coalfield. The enlarged bunker made them more suitable for these longer workings. Thirty were built.
