= LNWR Whale Experiment Class =

Class of 105 British 4-6-0 steam locomotives

LNWR Experiment Class (Whale)
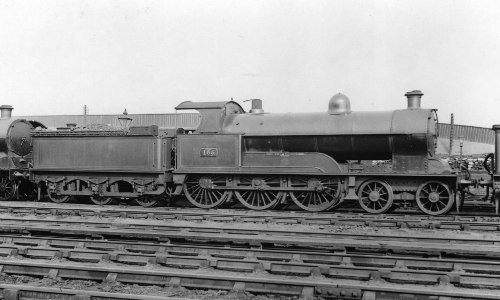
- No. 165 City of Lichfield at Hillhouse steam shed
Type and origin
- Power type: Steam
- Designer: George Whale
- Builder: Crewe Works
- Serial number: 4505–09, 4550–59, 4620–39, 4680–89, 4770–89, 4830–69
- Build date: 1905–1910
- Total produced: 105
- Rebuild date: 1915
- Number rebuilt: 1
Specifications
- Configuration
  - Whyte: 4-6-0
  - UIC: 2′C n2 (rebuilt: 2′C n4)
- Gauge: 4 ft 8 1/2 in (1,435 mm)
- Leading dia.: 3 ft 9 in (1.143 m)
- Driver dia.: 6 ft 3 in (1.905 m)
- Loco weight: 65.75 long tons (66.81 t)
- Fuel type: Coal
- Boiler pressure: 175 psi (1.21 MPa)
- Heating surface: 2,041 sq ft (189.6 m^{2})
- Cylinders: Two (rebuilt: four)
- Cylinder size: 19 in × 26 in (483 mm × 660 mm); rebuilt: 14 in × 26 in (356 mm × 660 mm)
- Valve gear: Joy; rebuilt: Dendy-Marshall
- Valve type: Slide valves
Performance figures
- Tractive effort: 18,616 lbf (82.8 kN); rebuilt: 20,232 lbf (90.0 kN)
Career
- Operators: London and North Western Railway → London, Midland and Scottish Railway
- Power class: LMS: 3P
- Number in class: 1 January 1923: 105
- Withdrawn: 1925–1935
- Disposition: All scrapped

The London and North Western Railway (LNWR) Experiment Class was a class of 4-6-0 steam locomotive designed by George Whale.

== Career ==
They were an extended version of the Whale Precursor Class 4-4-0, with slightly smaller driving wheels. The first of the class, 66 Experiment was built in 1905 and a total of 105 were constructed until 1910. The LNWR reused numbers and names of withdrawn locomotives, resulting in a haphazard numbering system. The 19in Express Goods Class with smaller driving wheels was also built from 1906. From 1911 the Prince of Wales Class, a superheated version, was built.

In 1915, 1361 Prospero was experimentally rebuilt with four cylinders, Dendy Marshall valve gear and superheated. The conversion was not repeated. Only two other engines were given superheaters; 2624 Saracen and 1993 (LMS 5472) Richard Moon.

All entered London, Midland and Scottish Railway (LMS) stock upon grouping in 1923. The LMS gave them the power classification 3P. They were renumbered into a more manageable series of 5450–5553 according to date of construction. An exception was made for 1361 Prospero which became 5554. Not all survived long enough to receive their LMS numbers — withdrawals had started in 1925. In 1934 the remaining thirteen had 20000 to their numbers to make room for Black Five, Patriot and Jubilee class locomotives. The final engine was withdrawn and scrapped the following year.

== Fleet list ==
Table of locomotives
LNWR No.	Name	Crewe Works No.	Built	LMS No.	With- drawn	Notes
66	Experiment	4505	Apr 1905	5450	Jul 1931	
306	Autocrat	4506	Jul 1905	5451	Dec 1930	
353	Britannic	4507	Jun 1905	5452	Dec 1930	
372	Germanic	4508	Jun 1905	5453	Sep 1928	Renamed Belgic from October 1914
507	Sarmatian	4509	Jun 1905	5454	Sep 1932	
565	City of Carlisle	4550	Jan 1906	5455	Jun 1925	LMS number never applied
893	City of Chester	4551	Jan 1906	5456	Aug 1935	Renumbered 25456 in 1935
1074	City of Dublin	4552	Jan 1906	5457	Sep 1934	
1357	City of Edinburgh	4553	Jan 1906	5458	Dec 1933	
1669	City of Glasgow	4554	Feb 1906	5464	Dec 1930	
165	City of Lichfield	4555	Jan 1906	5459	Dec 1930	
828	City of Liverpool	4556	Feb 1906	5460	Oct 1934	
978	City of London	4557	Feb 1906	5461	May 1934	
1405	City of Manchester	4558	Feb 1906	5462	Nov 1934	
1575	City of Paris	4559	Feb 1906	5463	Sep 1928	
1986	Clanricarde	4620	Sep 1906	5465	Oct 1925	LMS number never applied
1987	Glendower	4621	Sep 1906	5466	Nov 1934	
1988	Hurricane	4622	Sep 1906	5467	Sep 1928	
1989	Lady of the Lake	4623	Sep 1906	5468	Dec 1929	Name removed in December 1928
1990	North Western	4624	Oct 1906	5469	Mar 1932	
1991	Palmerston	4625	Oct 1906	5470	Feb 1928	
1992	President	4626	Oct 1906	5471	Dec 1933	
1993	Richard Moon	4627	Oct 1906	5472	Dec 1933	Superheated December 1926 to January 1932
1994	Scottish Chief	4628	Oct 1906	5473	Sep 1935	Renumbered 25473 in 1935
1995	Tornado	4629	Oct 1906	5481	Sep 1925	LMS number never applied
61	Atalanta	4630	Nov 1906	5474	Dec 1933	
222	Ivanhoe	4631	Nov 1903	5475	Jul 1935	
291	Leander	4632	Nov 1903	5476	Aug 1931	
667	Mazeppa	4633	Nov 1903	5477	Dec 1933	
1304	Prometheus	4634	Nov 1906	5478	Aug 1931	
1676	Prince of Wales	4635	Nov 1906	5479	Nov 1934	Renamed Shakespeare from July 1911
1709	Princess May	4636	Nov 1906	5480	Feb 1928	
2027	Queen Empress	4637	Nov 1906	5482	Oct 1931	
2052	Stephenson	4638	Dec 1906	5483	Dec 1930	
2269	William Cawkwell	4639	Dec 1906	5484	Aug 1931	
496	Harlequin	4680	Sep 1907	5485	Aug 1930	
830	Phosphorus	4681	Sep 1907	5486	Jul 1925	LMS number never applied
902	Combermere	4682	Sep 1907	5487	Oct 1934	
937	Princess Alice	4683	Sep 1907	5488	Mar 1934	
2112	Victoria	4684	Sep 1907	5490	Dec 1930	
1014	Henry Bessemer	4685	Sep 1905	5489	Mar 1928	
1135	Prince George	4686	Sep 1907	5491	Jun 1934	
1361	Prospero	4687	Oct 1907	5554	Jun 1933	Rebuilt with 4 cylinders in March 1915
1526	Sanspareil	4688	Oct 1907	5492	Nov 1928	
2161	Jeanie Deans	4689	Oct 1907	5493	Aug 1925	LMS number never applied
322	Adriatic	4770	Dec 1908	5494	Jun 1929	
884	Greater Britain	4771	Dec 1908	5495	Dec 1930	
887	Fortuna	4772	Jan 1909	5496	Mar 1932	
1020	Majestic	4773	Jan 1909	5497	Nov 1934	
1483	Red Gauntlet	4774	Jan 1909	5498	Dec 1933	
1490	Wellington	4775	Jan 1909	5499	Dec 1933	
1553	Faraday	4776	Jan 1909	5500	Oct 1931	
1571	Herschel	4777	Jan 1909	5501	Jan 1929	
2076	Pheasant	4778	Jan 1909	5502	Oct 1934	Renumbered 25502 in 1934
2116	Greystoke	4779	Jan 1909	5503	Jul 1925	LMS number never applied
2621	Ethelred	4780	Feb 1909	5504	Nov 1934	Renumbered 25504 in 1934
2622	Eunomia	4781	Feb 1909	5505	Apr 1928	
2623	Lord of the Isles	4782	Feb 1909	5506	Mar 1934	
2624	Saracen	4783	Feb 1909	5507	Feb 1928	Superheated from February 1926; LMS number never applied
2625	Buckland	4784	Feb 1909	5508	Aug 1935	Renumbered 25508 in 1935
2626	Chillington	4785	Feb 1909	5509	May 1935	Renumbered 25509 by LMS
2627	President Lincoln	4786	Feb 1905	5510	May 1928	
2628	Banshee	4787	Feb 1909	5511	Jul 1935	Renumbered 25511 in 1935
2629	Terrier	4788	Mar 1909	5512	Feb 1928	
2630	Buffalo	4789	Mar 1909	5513	Mar 1932	
1406	George Findlay	4830	Apr 1909	5514	Aug 1935	Renumbered 25514 by LMS
1413	Henry Cort	4831	Apr 1909	5515	Sep 1925	LMS number never applied
1477	Hugh Myddleton	4832	May 1909	5516	Apr 1928	
1498	Thomas Savery	4833	May 1909	5517	Sep 1925	LMS number never applied
1566	John Penn	4834	May 1909	5518	Dec 1933	
1603	Princess Alexandra	4835	May 1909	5519	Dec 1930	
1649	Sisyphus	4836	May 1909	5520	Aug 1932	
1661	Wordsworth	4837	May 1909	5521	Jun 1928	
1781	Lightning	4838	May 1909	5522	May 1930	
2022	Marlborough	4839	May 1909	5523	Apr 1934	
2637	Babylon	4840	Jun 1909	5524	Jan 1932	
2638	Byzantium	4841	Jun 1909	5525	Jun 1934	Renumbered 25525 in 1934
2639	Bactria	4842	Jun 1909	5526	Apr 1934	
2640	Belisarius	4843	Jun 1909	5527	Sep 1925	LMS number never applied
2641	Bellona	4844	Jun 1909	5528	Aug 1935	Renumbered 25528 in 1935
2642	Berenice	4845	Jun 1909	5529	Dec 1933	
2643	Bacchus	4846	Jun 1909	5530	Oct 1927	LMS number never applied
2644	Berengaria	4847	Jun 1905	5531	Aug 1934	Renumbered 25531 in 1934
2645	Britomart	4848	Jul 1909	5532	Sep 1934	Renumbered 25532 in 1934
2646	Boniface	4849	Jul 1909	5533	Sep 1928	
1412	Bedfordshire	4850	Nov 1909	5534	Jan 1932	
1418	Cheshire	4851	Nov 1909	5535	Dec 1931	
1420	Derbyshire	4852	Nov 1909	5536	Dec 1933	
1455	Herefordshire	4853	Nov 1909	5537	Dec 1933	
1611	Hertfordshire	4854	Nov 1909	5538	Sep 1925	LMS number never applied
1618	Lancashire	4855	Nov 1909	5539	Mar 1934	
1624	Leicestershire	4856	Nov 1909	5545	Dec 1933	
1652	Middlesex	4857	Nov 1909	5546	Dec 1933	
1689	Monmouthshire	4858	Dec 1909	5547	Mar 1932	
1703	Northumberland	4859	Dec 1909	5548	Mar 1934	
71	Oxfordshire	4860	Dec 1909	5540	Apr 1928	
275	Shropshire	4861	Dec 1909	5541	Sep 1928	
677	Staffordshire	4862	Dec 1909	5542	Dec 1933	
1002	Warwickshire	4863	Dec 1909	5543	Dec 1930	
1534	Westmorlandshire	4864	Dec 1909	5544	Sep 1925	LMS number never applied
1471	Worcestershire	4865	Jan 1910	5549	Mar 1932	
1561	Yorkshire	4866	Jan 1910	5550	Sep 1928	
1618	Carnarvonshire	4867	Jan 1910	5551	Mar 1934	
1621	Denbighshire	4868	Jan 1910	5552	Jun 1935	Renumbered 25552 by LMS
1658	Flintshire	4869	Jan 1910	5553	Jul 1931	

== Accidents and incidents ==
- On 15 October 1907, a mail train hauled by No. 2052 Stephenson was derailed at Shrewsbury, Shropshire due to excessive speed on a curve. Eighteen people were killed.
- On 5 July 1923, an express passenger train hauled by 1406 George Findlay was involved in a rear-end collision with a freight train at Diggle, Lancashire due to confusion by the driver of the freight train over flag signals. Four people were killed.
