= LNWR Whale Precursor Class =

Type of steam locomotive

LNWR Precursor Class (Whale)
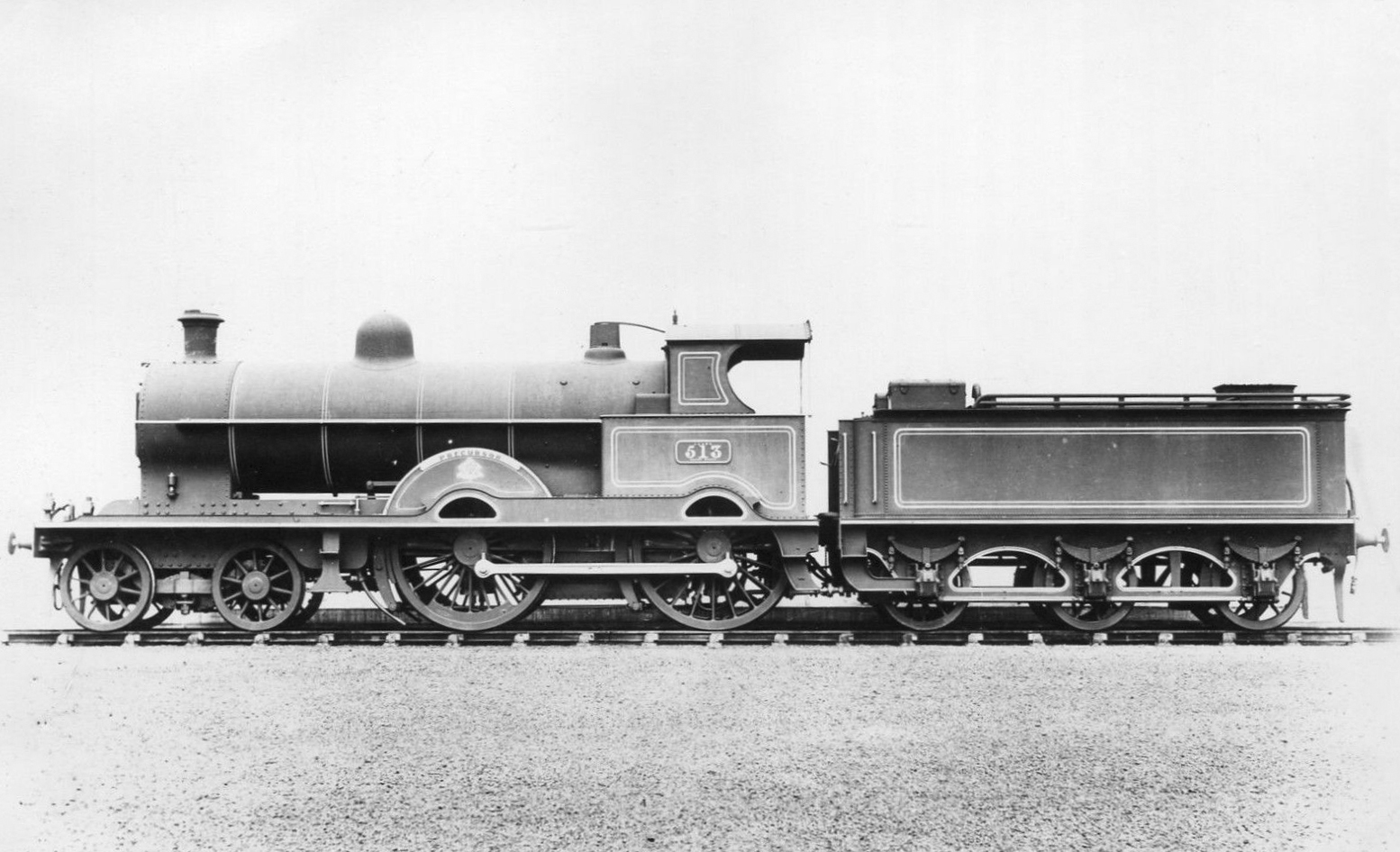
- No. 513, Precursor in photographic grey livery
Type and origin
- Power type: Steam
- Designer: George Whale
- Builder: LNWR Crewe Works
- Serial number: 4415–4419, 4440–4504, 4510–4549, 4660–4679
- Build date: 1904–1907
- Total produced: 130
Specifications
- Configuration
  - Whyte: 4-4-0
  - UIC: 2′B n2 or 2′B h2
- Gauge: 4 ft 8 1/2 in (1,435 mm)
- Driver dia.: 6 ft 9 in (2.057 m)
- Loco weight: 59.15 long tons (60.10 t)
- Boiler pressure: 175 psi (1.21 MPa)
- Cylinders: Two
- Cylinder size: 19 in × 26 in (483 mm × 660 mm) or 20 1/2 in × 26 in (521 mm × 660 mm)
- Valve gear: Joy
Performance figures
- Tractive effort: 18,222 lbf (81.1 kN) or 20,640 lbf (91.8 kN)
Career
- Operators: London and North Western Railway → London, Midland and Scottish Railway → British Railways
- Power class: LMS: 2P, 3P
- Number in class: 1 January 1923: 130; 1 January 1948: 1
- Withdrawn: 1927–1949
- Disposition: All scrapped

The London and North Western Railway (LNWR) "Precursor" Class was a type of 4-4-0 ("American") steam locomotive designed by the company's Chief Mechanical Engineer, George Whale. Introduced in 1904, it should not be confused with the LNWR 2-4-0 "Precursor" Class of 1874 designed by Francis Webb, the last example of which was scrapped in 1895. In 1906, a 4-4-2T ("Atlantic") tank variant of Whale's engine, the "Precursor Tank" Class, also entered service.

== History ==
The Precursor Class was essentially a larger version of the LNWR "Improved Precedent" Class, being Whale's first attempt at producing a locomotive which would remove the requirement for express trains to be double headed (then standard practice on the LNWR). 130 examples of the class were constructed at Crewe Works between March 1904 and August 1907, their introduction allowing Whale to phase out the unreliable compound locomotives favoured by his predecessor, Francis Webb. As built, they were saturated, although a small number were fitted with superheaters between February 1913 and September 1919.

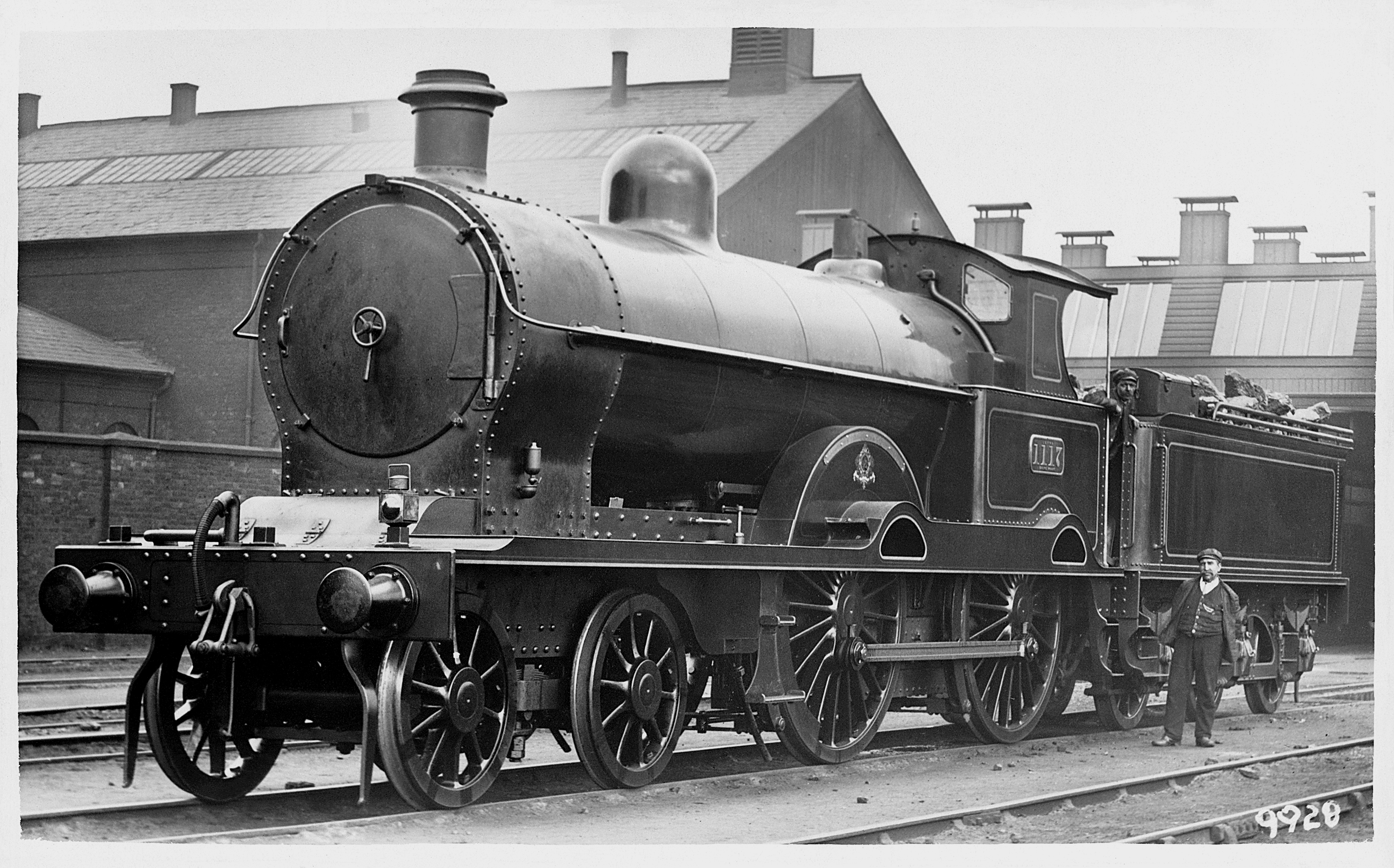
Precursor Class no. 1117 Vandal at Shrewsbury engine shed, soon after emerging from Crewe Works in November 1904 (from an old postcard).

Whilst the Precursors created issues for crews as some of the cab controls were difficult to operate or reach, they were generally successful in terms of operating performance. However, having apparently experienced difficulty keeping time on trials between Crewe and Carlisle, they were not used on heavier gradients such as the climb to Shap. (Note: A photograph in The Railway Magazine also shows a Webb compound "Jubilee" Class locomotive piloting 282 Alaric on a London to Holyhead express near Harrow in 1917.) Because of this an extended version of the Precursors, the 4-6-0 "Experiment" Class, was introduced in 1905. Nevertheless, double heading was still necessary on many trains north of Preston due to accelerated schedules and increased loads.

In 1910, the Precursors were developed by Whale's successor, Charles Bowen-Cooke, into the 4-4-0 superheated "George the Fifth" Class. The main visual difference was that the Precursors had separate splashers over each of the driving wheels while the Georges had combined splashers that covered both pairs.

The LNWR reused numbers and names from withdrawn locomotives, with the result that the numbering system was completely haphazard. Starting with the first of the class 513 "Precursor" in 1913, were given superheaters, the process continuing until just after grouping in 1923. Most of the superheated engines were also converted from having slide valves to piston valves.

This resulted in two main subclasses; saturated locomotives with 19 by 26 inches (480 mm × 660 mm) cylinders, and superheated locomotives with 20.5 by 26 inches (520 mm × 660 mm) cylinders. The LMS gave them the power classification 3P. The saturated engines were given the LMS numbers in the 5187–5266 series, though not all survived long enough to receive them. The superheated engines were given the LMS numbers 5270–5319 (5267–5269 were not used).

The LMS continued to superheat engines until 1926, these rebuilds retained their LMS number. Also, three superheated engines became saturated via boiler swaps.

Withdrawals of the saturated engines started in 1927 and the last engine in as built condition was withdrawn in 1935. The four superheated engines which retained slide valves were withdrawn from 1931 to 1936. Withdrawals of the superheated engines with piston valves began in 1935. Those not withdrawn had 20000 added to their numbers from 1934 to 1937 to make room for Black Fives.

By the outbreak of the Second World War in September 1939, only 11 Precursors were still in service. A single example, 25297 "Sirocco", was inherited by British Railways in 1948, but this was withdrawn in June 1949 before the number it had been allocated (58010) could be applied.

None were preserved.

== Accidents ==
=== Great Bridgeford ===
On 17 June 1932, locomotive number 5278 Precursor was hauling the 7:23 p.m. Crewe to Stafford and Birmingham New Street express passenger service when, at around 7:52 p.m., the engine and all four coaches derailed just to the south of Great Bridgeford station, Staffordshire.

Of the 70 to 80 passengers on board the train, three were killed immediately and a fourth died in hospital the next day. 54 people were injured in the accident, with 11 people (the driver and fireman plus 9 passengers) getting injuries serious enough for hospitalization, and a further 18 were treated at the scene and able to continue their journeys.

== Fleet list ==
Table of locomotives
LNWR No.	Name(s)	Crewe Works No.	Date built	LMS No.	Date withdrawn (Note: Although the withdrawal dates listed are drawn from both Baxter and Yaedon, information from the latter was preferred in the 10 instances where these sources disagreed. Two of Baxter's dates appear to be misprints, namely June 1947 for 25297 Sirocco, and June 1957 for 25302 Shamrock. There are 7 further discrepancies of one month, and one of two months. Differences of a single month could possibly be explained by Yaedon's method of correcting for the fact that until August 1927, LMS stock returns were based on calendar months, but then the company accountants decided to split the year up into periods of 4 weeks.)	Notes
513	Precursor	4415	March 1904	5278	July 1936	(f)(h)
1395	Harbinger	4416	March 1904	5291	June 1937	(h)(i)
1419	Tamerlane	4417	March 1904	5285	March 1936	(h)
2023	Helvellyn	4418	April 1904	5187	March 1936	(h)(i)
2164	Oberon	4419	May 1904	5277	August 1946	(h)(i)
2	Simoom	4440	June 1904	5308	October 1936	(h)
7	Titan	4441	June 1904	5276	October 1935	(h)
412	Alfred Paget, Marquis	4442	June 1904	5188	April 1940	(a)(h)(i)
510	Albatross	4443	June 1904	5189	August 1933	
659	Dreadnought	4444	June 1904	5296	May 1936	(h)
639	Ajax	4445	October 1904	5190	September 1928	
648	Archimedes	4446	October 1904	5191	January 1928	
685	Cossack	4447	October 1904	5192	April 1932	
60	Dragon	4448	October 1904	5298	November 1938	(h)(i)
106	Druid	4449	October 1904	5294	May 1937	(h)(i)
301	Leviathan	4450	November 1904	5289	May 1936	(h)
305	Senator	4451	November 1904	5307	February 1937	(h)(i)
643	Sirocco	4452	November 1904	5297	June 1949	(h)(i)(j)
1102	Thunderbolt	4453	November 1904	5193	September 1931	
1117	Vandal	4454	November 1904	5194	October 1931	
310	Achilles	4455	December 1904	5290	October 1936	(h)
333	Ambassador	4456	December 1904	5284	August 1936	(h)
515	Champion	4457	December 1904	5282	December 1939	(h)(i)
622	Euphrates	4458	December 1904	5195	November 1927	
638	Huskisson	4459	December 1904	5196	April 1933	
303	Himalaya	4460	January 1905	5305	January 1936	(f)(h)
645	Mammoth	4461	January 1905	5197	November 1930	
806	Swiftsure	4462	January 1905	5318	October 1935	(h)
1120	Thunderer	4463	January 1905	5310	August 1939	(b)(h)(i)
1137	Vesuvius	4464	February 1905	5299	August 1936	(h)(i)
323	Argus	4465	February 1905	5303	October 1936	(f)(h)
1104	Cedric	4466	February 1905	5199	December 1933	
1111	Cerberus	4467	March 1905	5200	September 1934	
1431	Egeria	4468	March 1905	5201	November 1930	
2064	Jason	4469	March 1905	5273	August 1931	(g)(h)
40	Niagara	4470	March 1905	5198	November 1930	
520	Panopea	4471	March 1905	5202	January 1934	
1469	Tantalus	4472	March 1905	5288	March 1937	(h)(i)
1737	Viscount	4473	March 1905	5316	July 1936	(h)
2031	Waverley	4474	March 1905	5203	November 1931	
365	Alchymist	4475	April 1905	5287	June 1937	(h)(i)
1115	Apollo	4476	April 1905	5205	February 1928	
1545	Cyclops	4477	April 1905	5206	May 1932	
1573	Dunrobin	4478	April 1905	5286	September 1937	(h)(i)
2061	Eglinton	4479	April 1905	5207	August 1936	(h)(i)
184	Havelock	4480	May 1905	5204	September 1931	
366	Medusa	4481	May 1905	5292	April 1945	(h)(i)
519	Messenger	4482	May 1905	5208	November 1931	
2120	Trentham	4483	May 1905	5209	October 1927	
1430	Victor	4484	May 1905	5210	October 1931	
113	Aurania	4485	July 1905	5211	September 1936	(h)(i)
300	Emerald	4486	July 1905	5301	October 1935	(h)
302	Greyhound	4487	July 1905	5304	January 1947	(f)(h)(i)
315	Harrowby	4488	July 1905	5212	December 1936	(h)(i)
688	Hecate	4489	July 1905	5274	October 1935	(f)(h)
1509	America	4490	July 1905	5214	March 1928	
1617	Hydra	4491	August 1905	5300	July 1940	(h)(i)
1723	Scorpion	4492	August 1905	5295	November 1936	(h)
2062	Sunbeam	4493	August 1905	5279	August 1939	(h)(i)
2257	Vulture	4494	August 1905	5215	December 1933	
311	Emperor	4495	September 1905	5213	May 1933	(h)
374	Empress	4496	September 1905	5317	June 1936	(h)
811	Express	4497	September 1905	5311	March 1941	(b)(h)(i)
911	Herald	4498	September 1905	5216	February 1936	(h)(i)
1114	Knowsley	4499	September 1905	5217	February 1933	
1116	Pandora	4500	September 1905	5218	April 1936	(h)(i)
1510	Psyche	4501	September 1905	5219	December 1930	
1784	Python	4502	October 1905	5220	November 1931	
2165	Shooting Star	4503	October 1905	5280	November 1935	(h)
2202	Vizier	4504	October 1905	5221	December 1930	
117	Alaska	4510	October 1905	5222	September 1933	
1301	Candidate	4511	October 1905	5225	November 1936	(h)(i)
1363	Cormwall, Brindley	4512	October 1905	5272	December 1939	(c)(h)(i)
1396	Harpy	4513	November 1905	5226	November 1930	
2007	Oregon	4514	November 1905	5227	October 1927	
2012	Penguin	4515	November 1905	5228	October 1931	
2115	Servia	4516	November 1905	5229	April 1932	
127	Snake	4517	November 1905	5223	November 1936	(h)(i)
229	Stork	4518	November 1905	5224	November 1927	
1439	Tiger	4519	November 1905	5275	January 1933	(g)(h)
2576	Arab	4520	December 1905	5230	September 1933	
2577	Etna	4521	December 1905	5313	February 1936	(h)
2578	Fame	4522	December 1905	5309	August 1936	(h)
2579	Ganymede	4523	December 1905	5231	February 1936	(h)
2580	Problem	4524	December 1905	5232	November 1931	
2581	Peel	4525	December 1905	5233	August 1934	
2582	Rowland Hill	4526	December 1905	5234	November 1928	
2583	Teutonic, The Tsar, Moonstone	4527	December 1905	5235	April 1935	(d)
2584	Velocipede	4528	January 1906	5312	December 1935	(e)(h)
2585	Watt	4529	January 1906	5236	December 1933	
723	Coptic	4530	February 1906	5239	January 1936	(h)
837	Friar	4531	February 1906	5240	October 1933	
1312	Ionic	4532	February 1906	5242	November 1930	
1387	Lang Meg	4533	March 1906	5306	February 1936	(f)(h)
1642	Lapwing	4534	March 1906	5243	November 1935	(h)
2513	Levens	4535	March 1906	5293	June 1939	(h)(i)
234	Pearl	4536	March 1906	5237	February 1932	
526	Ilion	4537	March 1906	5238	December 1928	
1311	Napoleon	4538	March 1906	5241	January 1936	(h)
2017	Tubal	4539	March 1906	5244	November 1935	(h)
282	Alaric	4540	April 1906	5314	November 1935	(h)
561	Antaeus	4541	April 1906	5245	March 1941	(h)(i)
675	Adjutant	4542	April 1906	5246	February 1936	(h)
772	Admiral	4543	April 1906	5247	October 1927	
804	Amphion	4544	April 1906	5248	October 1935	(h)
990	Bucephalus	4545	April 1906	5319	December 1940	(h)(i)
988	Bellerophon	4546	April 1906	5249	June 1933	
1433	Faerie Queene	4547	April 1906	5250	November 1935	(h)
1650	Richard Trevithick	4548	May 1906	5251	February 1928	
1787	Hyperion	4549	May 1906	5252	December 1930	
1	Clive	4660	June 1907	5253	November 1930	
218	Daphne	4661	June 1907	5254	August 1933	
419	Monarch	4662	June 1907	5255	December 1930	
564	Erebus	4663	June 1907	5281	September 1936	(h)
665	Mersey	4664	June 1907	5256	October 1927	
469	Marmion	4665	June 1907	5270	May 1936	(f)
1011	Locke	4666	July 1907	5257	January 1933	
1364	Clyde	4667	July 1907	5258	November 1930	
2053	Edith	4668	July 1907	5259	March 1934	
2181	Eleanor	4669	July 1907	5260	December 1933	
276	Doric	4670	July 1907	5261	November 1927	
754	Celtic	4671	July 1907	5262	December 1930	
802	Gaelic	4672	July 1907	5271	November 1931	(g)
807	Oceanic	4673	August 1907	5263	December 1933	
976	Pacific	4674	August 1907	5264	November 1928	
1297	Phalaris	4675	August 1907	5265	October 1931	
1309	Shamrock	4676	August 1907	5302	June 1937	(f)(h)(i)
1516	Alecto	4677	August 1907	5266	October 1931	
2011	Brougham	4678	August 1907	5283	March 1936	(h)
2051	Delamere	4679	August 1907	5315	September 1936	(h)
(a) Name changed November 1904. (b) Name removed September 1936. (c) Name changed May 1911. (d) Name changed November 1914 and December 1915. (e) Name removed August 1933. (f) Superheater fitted. (g) Superheater fitted but later removed. (h) Converted to LNWR George the Fifth Class. (i) 20000 added to LMS number. (j) Allocated, but never carried number 58010 by British Railways.

== See also ==
- Locomotives of the London and North Western Railway
