= LNWR George the Fifth Class =

Class of 90 two-cylinder 4-4-0 passenger locomotives

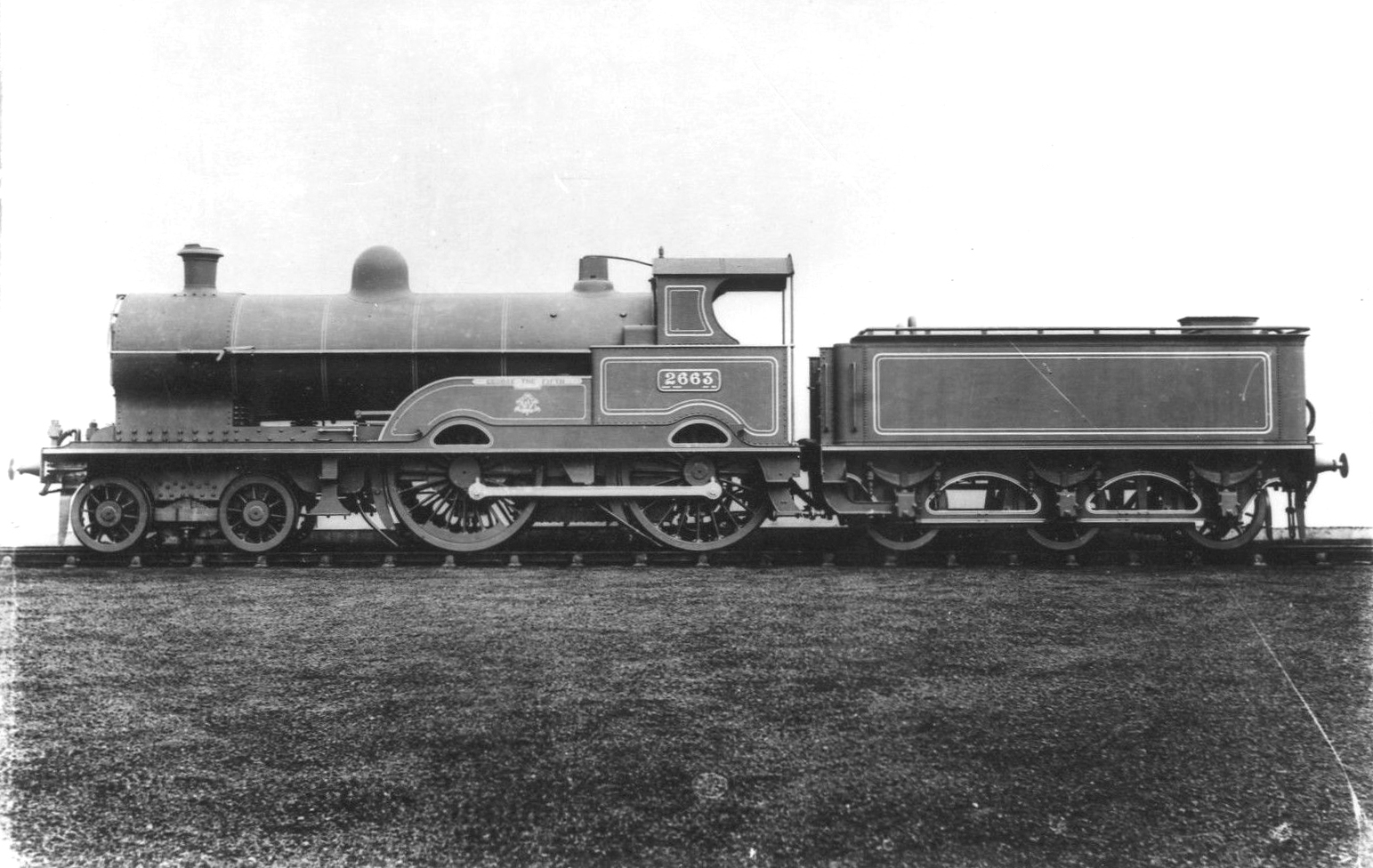
- No. 2663 George the Fifth in photographic grey livery
Type and origin
- Power type: Steam
- Designer: Charles Bowen-Cooke
- Builder: Crewe Works
- Serial number: 4970–5029, 5118–5137, 5237–5246
- Build date: 1910–1915
- Total produced: 90 (80 new, 10 rebuilt from Queen Mary class)
Specifications
- Configuration
  - Whyte: 4-4-0
  - UIC: 2′B h2
- Gauge: 4 ft 8 1/2 in (1,435 mm)
- Leading dia.: 3 ft 3 in (0.991 m)
- Driver dia.: 6 ft 9 in (2.057 m)
- Loco weight: 59.85 long tons (60.81 t)
- Boiler pressure: 180 psi (1.24 MPa)
- Heating surface: 1,849 sq ft (171.8 m^{2})
- Superheater: Schmidt
- Cylinders: Two
- Cylinder size: 20 in × 26 in (508 mm × 660 mm) or 20 1/2 in × 26 in (521 mm × 660 mm)
- Valve gear: Joy
Performance figures
- Tractive effort: 20,640 lbf (91.8 kN)
Career
- Operators: London and North Western Railway; London, Midland and Scottish Railway; British Railways
- Power class: LMS: 3P
- Number in class: 1 January 1923: 90, 1 January 1948: 3
- Withdrawn: 1935–1948
- Disposition: All original locomotives scrapped; one new-build under construction

The London and North Western Railway (LNWR) George the Fifth Class was a class of 4-4-0 passenger steam locomotive.

== History ==
The locomotives were introduced during July 1910 by Charles Bowen-Cooke following the succession of George V, construction continued until 1915. They were essentially superheated versions of the LNWR Whale Precursor Class. At the same time, similar non-superheated Queen Mary Class engines were also built but all of these acquired superheaters as the advantages of superheating became clear and were absorbed into the George the Fifth Class.

A total of 90 Georges were built, and all were named. The LNWR reused names and numbers from withdrawn locomotives, with the result that the numbering system was completely haphazard.

All of the Georges passed into London, Midland and Scottish Railway (LMS) ownership on the grouping in 1923. The LMS gave them the power classification 3P. The LMS renumbered them into a more logical series of 5320–5409, and later in 1936/37 those had not been then withdrawn were again renumbered by the addition of 20000 into the 25320–25409 series to make room for Black Fives. It was also at this time that a few of the names were removed so that they could be applied to new LMS Jubilee Class engines.

Withdrawals started in 1935, and by 1939 only nine remained. British Railways (BR) inherited three in 1948: 25321, which was withdrawn in February that year, and 25350 and 25373, which were allocated the BR numbers 58011/2 in March but never carried them as both were withdrawn in May that year. No original members have been preserved.

== Accidents and incidents ==
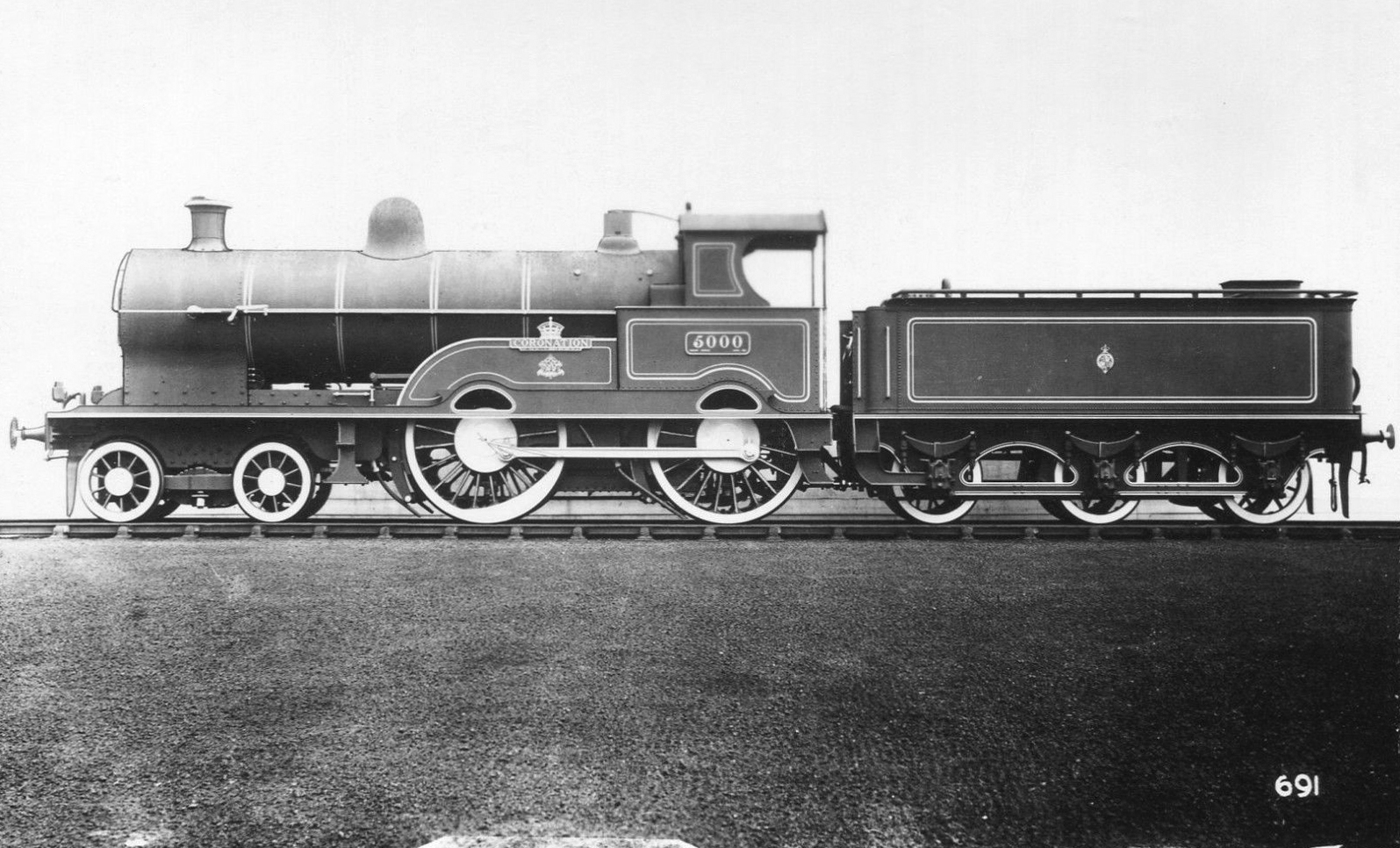
Crewe Works No. 5000 Coronation with its distinctive crowned name plate

- On 14 August 1915, locomotive No. 1489 Wolfhound was hauling a passenger train when it suffered a mechanical failure in its motion, with the result that the opposite track was damaged. A mail train was derailed on the damaged track at Weedon, Northamptonshire. Ten people were killed and 21 were injured.

== New Build Locomotive ==
Since 2012 the George the Fifth Steam Trust is currently building a George the Fifth class locomotive named after Prince George.

== List of Locomotives ==
List of LNWR George the Fifth class locomotives
LNWR No.	LNWR name	Crewe Works No.	Date built	LMS No.	Date withdrawn	Notes
2663	George the Fifth	4970	July 1910	5320	February 1936	
1294	F. S. P. Wolferstan	4971	November 1910	5322	December 1938	†
1725	John Bateson	4972	November 1910	5324	November 1938	†
2155	W. C. Brocklehurst	4973	November 1910	5326	December 1936	†
1059	Lord Loch	4974	November 1910	5321	February 1948	†
1583	Henry Ward	4975	November 1910	5323	September 1939	†
2025	Sir Thomas Brooke	4976	December 1910	5325	May 1937	†
228	E. Nettlefold	4977	January 1911	5327	September 1936	
445	P. H. Chambres	4978	January 1911	5328	November 1935	
2664	Queen Mary	4979	July 1910	5329	March 1936	Built as "Queen Mary" class; converted June 1913
2168	Henry Maudslay	4980	January 1911	5339	April 1937	†
238	F. W. Webb	4981	October 1910	5336	March 1936	Built as "Queen Mary" class; converted September 1914
896	George Whale	4982	October 1910	5332	February 1936	Built as "Queen Mary" class; converted January 1914
1195	T. J. Hare	4983	October 1910	5337	July 1936	Built as "Queen Mary" class; converted September 1914
1550	Westminster	4984	October 1910	5330	September 1936	Built as "Queen Mary" class; converted September 1913
1559	Drake	4985	October 1910	5333	March 1936	Built as "Queen Mary" class; converted January 1914
2151	Newcomen	4986	October 1910	5334	November 1937	† Built as "Queen Mary" class; converted April 1914
2271	J. P. Bickersteth	4987	October 1910	5331	November 1938	† Built as "Queen Mary" class; converted November 1913
2507	Miles MacInnes	4988	October 1910	5335	November 1935	Built as "Queen Mary" class; converted January 1914
2512	Thomas Houghton	4989	October 1910	5338	November 1935	Built as "Queen Mary" class; converted October 1914
956	Bulldog	4990	April 1911	5340	November 1935	Named Dachshund until December 1915
1489	Wolfhound	4991	April 1911	5341	March 1936	
1504	Boarhound	4992	April 1911	5342	November 1935	
1513	Otterhound	4993	May 1911	5343	April 1936	
1532	Bloodhound	4994	May 1911	5344	January 1937	†
1628	Foxhound	4995	May 1911	5345	December 1933	†
1662	Deerhound	4996	May 1911	5346	February 1936	
1706	Elkhound	4997	May 1911	5347	December 1940	†
1792	Staghound	4998	May 1911	5353	June 1936	
2495	Bassethound	4999	May 1911	5357	January 1939	†
1800	Coronation	5000	June 1911	5348	June 1940	† Ran briefly as no. 5000
502	British Empire	5001	June 1911	5349	July 1936	
868	India	5002	June 1911	5350	May 1948	‡
882	Canada	5003	June 1911	5351	February 1936	
1218	Australia	5004	June 1911	5352	November 1935	
2081	New Zealand	5005	June 1911	5354	January 1936	
2212	South Africa	5006	June 1911	5355	July 1936	
2291	Gibraltar	5007	June 1911	5356	August 1941	†
2177	Malta	5008	July 1911	5358	November 1936	
2498	Cyprus	5009	July 1911	5359	December 1936	
361	Beagle	5010	July 1911	5360	September 1937	†
888	Challenger	5011	July 1911	5361	November 1935	
1360	Fire Queen	5012	July 1911	5362	March 1939	†
1394	Harrier	5013	July 1911	5363	February 1936	
2494	Perseus	5014	August 1911	5368	November 1936	
1623	Nubian	5015	August 1911	5364	November 1936	
1631	Racehorse	5016	August 1911	5365	April 1937	†
1644	Roebuck	5017	August 1911	5366	November 1936	
2089	Traveller	5018	August 1911	5367	December 1936	
2220	Vanguard	5019	August 1911	5374	November 1938	†
1371	Quail	5020	September 1911	5369	September 1936	†
1417	Landrail	5021	September 1911	5370	December 1936	
1472	Moorhen	5022	September 1911	5371	October 1939	†
1595	Wild Duck	5023	September 1911	5372	December 1936	†
1681	Ptarmigan	5024	September 1911	5373	May 1948	‡
1713	Partridge	5025	September 1911	5375	December 1935	
1730	Snipe	5026	October 1911	5376	December 1947	†
1733	Grouse	5027	October 1911	5377	July 1937	†
1777	Widgeon	5028	October 1911	5378	June 1937	†
1799	Woodcock	5029	October 1911	5379	August 1936	
82	Charles Dickens	5118	January 1913	5380	February 1937	†
752	John Hick	5119	February 1913	5381	November 1935	
2124	John Rennie	5120	February 1913	5382	June 1937	†
1138	William Froude	5121	February 1913	5385	August 1936	
2154	William Siemens	5122	February 1913	5387	February 1937	†
2282	Richard Arkwright	5123	February 1913	5388	April 1936	
89	John Mayall	5124	March 1913	5383	May 1936	
132	S. R. Graves	5125	March 1913	5384	February 1936	
1193	Edward Tootal	5126	March 1913	5386	January 1936	
2279	Henry Crossfield	5127	March 1913	5395	February 1937	†
681	St. George	5128	April 1913	5390	November 1935	
845	Saddleback	5129	March 1913	5391	February 1936	
1188	Penmaenmawr	5130	April 1913	5392	February 1941	†
1680	Loyalty	5131	April 1913	5393	May 1941	†
2086	Phaeton	5132	April 1913	5394	July 1936	
404	Eclipse	5133	April 1913	5389	June 1937	†
1481	Typhon	5134	April 1913	5396	October 1936	
2197	Planet	5135	April 1913	5397	December 1935	
2242	Meteor	5136	May 1913	5398	October 1936	
2428	Lord Stalbridge	5137	May 1913	5399	July 1936	
363	Llandudno	5237	May 1915	5400	November 1935	
789	Windermere	5238	May 1915	5401	February 1936	
984	Carnarvon	5239	May 1915	5402	June 1936	
104	Leamington Spa	5242	June 1915	5403	November 1935	Named Leamington until December 1915
226	Colwyn Bay	5243	June 1915	5404	February 1936	
1086	Conway	5244	June 1915	5405	January 1936	
2153	Llandrindod	5240	June 1915	5406	April 1937	†
2233	Blackpool	5241	June 1915	5407	November 1935	
2106	Holyhead	5245	July 1915	5408	May 1937	†
2370	Dovedale	5246	July 1915	5409	June 1939	†

- † Locomotives that had 20000 added to their number from 1934
- ‡ Locomotives that had 20000 added to their number from 1934, and were allocated the BR numbers 58011 (25350) and 58012 (25373 Ptarmigan). Neither survived long enough to carry them.

== See also ==
- LNWR Prince of Wales Class
- LNWR Claughton Class
