= LNWR Precursor Tank Class =

Steam locomotive

LNWR Precursor Tank
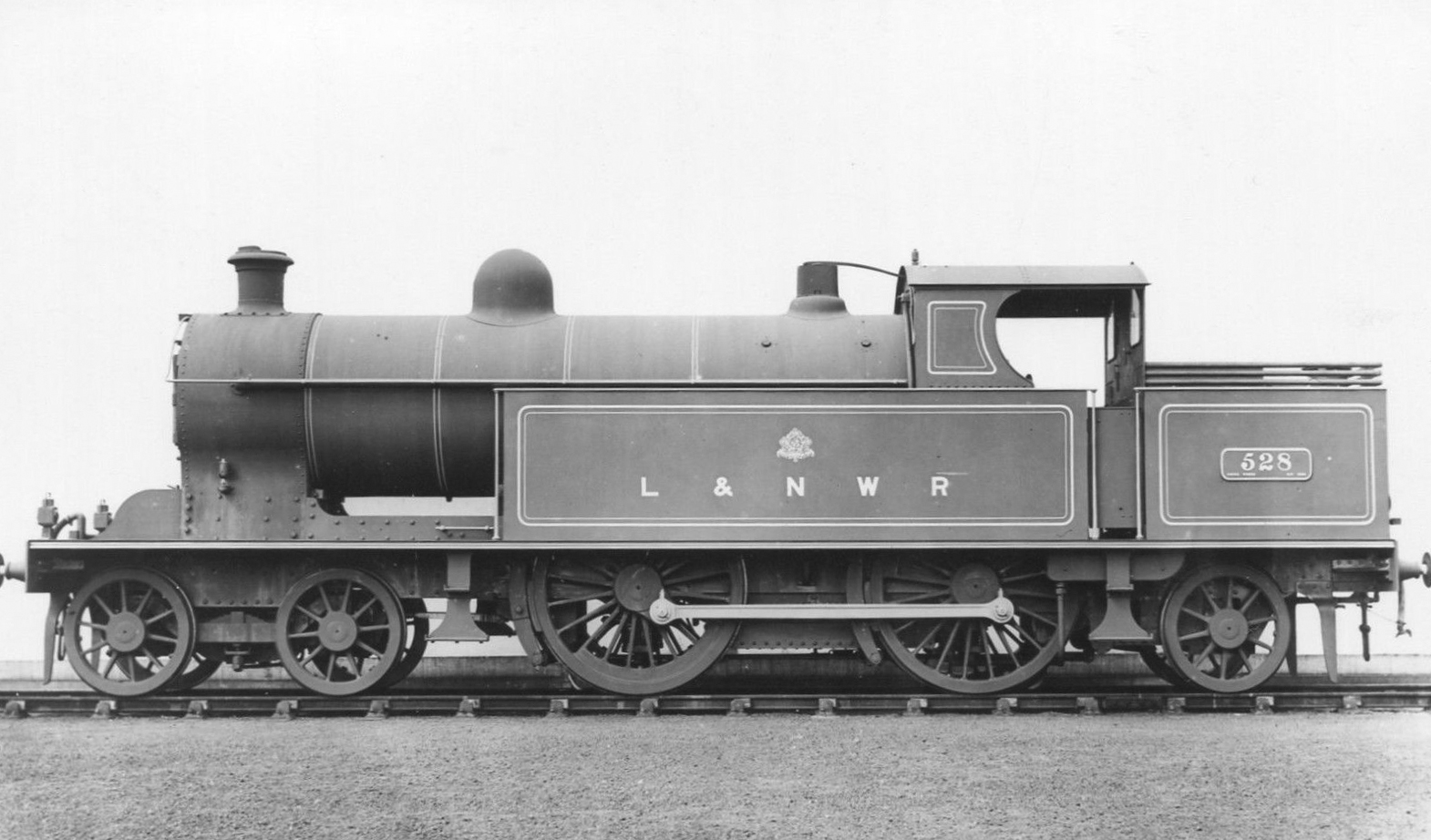
- No. 528 in photographic grey livery
Type and origin
- Power type: Steam
- Designer: George Whale
- Serial number: 4560–4599, 4820–4829
- Build date: 1906–1909
- Total produced: 50
Specifications
- Configuration
  - Whyte: 4-4-2T
  - UIC: 2′B1 2t
- Gauge: 4 ft 8 1/2 in (1,435 mm)
- Leading dia.: First 30: 3 ft 9 in (1.143 m); Last 20: 3 ft 3 in (0.991 m)
- Driver dia.: 6 ft 3 in (1.905 m)
- Trailing dia.: First 30: 3 ft 9 in (1.143 m); Last 20: 3 ft 3 in (0.991 m)
- Loco weight: 74 long tons 15 cwt (167,400 lb or 75.9 t)
- Boiler pressure: 175 psi (1.21 MPa)
- Heating surface: 1,939 sq ft (180.1 m^{2})
- Cylinders: Two, inside
- Cylinder size: 19 in × 26 in (483 mm × 660 mm)
- Valve gear: Joy
Performance figures
- Tractive effort: 15,216 lbf (67.68 kN)
Career
- Operators: LNWR » LMS
- Power class: LMS: 2P
- Withdrawn: 1927–1940
- Disposition: All scrapped

The London and North Western Railway (LNWR) "Precursor Tank" Class was a type of 4-4-2 tank steam locomotive. Fifty were built to the design of George Whale between May 1906 and April 1909, being a tank engine version of his "Precursor" Class.

Chronologically, the class was constructed three distinct blocks, from May to September 1906 (works nos. 4560–4589), March to April 1907 (4590–4599), and March to April 1909 (4820–4829). The first 30 locomotives had 3 ft 9 in (1.143 m) carrying wheels, but the size of these was reduced to 3 ft 3 in (0.991 m) thereafter.

The LNWR reused numbers from withdrawn locomotives, so the numbering system was completely haphazard. The 3 ft 9 in engines were numbered by 528, 531, 784, 1295, 1305, 1981–1985, 97, 111, 181, 196, 562, 616, 803, 1356, 1508, 2210, 139, 653, 834, 874, 1506, 1572, 1589, 1671, 1714, and 2165. The 3 ft 3 in engines were numbered 44, 527, 612, 762, 827, 875, 1427, 1764, 2196, 2446, 920, 935, 1164, 1219, 1523, 1536, 1551, 2077, 2223 and 2228.

All fifty passed into LMS ownership in 1923. The LMS gave them the power classification 2P. The LMS also renumbered them into solid block of numbers: 6780–6809 for the 3 ft 9 in engines and 6810–6829 for the 3 ft 3 in engines, in the order given above.

Due to their weight, the Precursor Tanks were unable to operate on some branch lines, but had primarily been designed for use on heavy suburban trains. Initially, they were put to work on local services between Sutton Coldfield and Birmingham, and also between Watford and London Euston. In 1921, they were reported as being employed on the latter to the near-total exclusion of other locomotive types, as well as on other routes. 1572, which was possibly one of the earliest locomotives to have the initials "L&NWR" on its sides replaced by "LMS", was noted to be working on the Morecambe branch in 1923.

One member of the class was withdrawn in October 1927, and the others between December 1931 and February 1940. None were preserved.
