= LNWR 1185 Class =

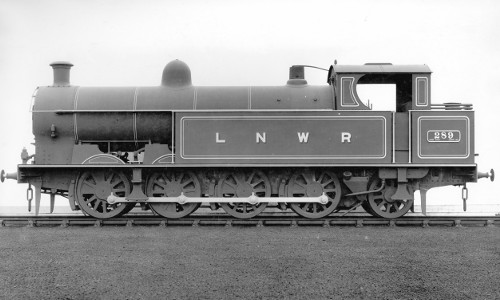
- No. 289 in photographic grey livery
Type and origin
- Power type: Steam
- Designer: Charles Bowen-Cooke
- Builder: LNWR Crewe Works
- Serial number: 5040–5049, 5247–5256, 5357–5366
- Build date: 1911–1917
- Total produced: 30
Specifications
- Configuration
  - Whyte: 0-8-2T
  - UIC: D1 n2t
- Gauge: 4 ft 8 1/2 in (1,435 mm)
- Driver dia.: 4 ft 3 in (1.295 m) (4 ft 5 1/2 in (140 mm) with 3 in (76 mm) tyres)
- Trailing dia.: 3 ft 9 in (1.143 m) with 3 in (76 mm) tyres
- Wheelbase: 23 ft 6 in (7.16 m)
- Axle load: 13T-0C+17T-5C+15T-5C+14T-0C+13T-0C = 72T-10C
- Adhesive weight: 59 long tons 10 cwt (133,300 lb or 60.5 t)
- Loco weight: 72 long tons 10 cwt (162,400 lb or 73.7 t)
- Fuel type: Coal
- Fuel capacity: 2 long tons 15 cwt (6,200 lb or 2.8 t)
- Water cap.: 1,200 imp gal (5,500 L; 1,400 US gal)
- Firebox
  - Grate area: 23.6 sq ft (2.19 m^{2})
- Boiler: Pitch: 8 ft 3 in (2.51 m)
- Boiler pressure: 170 lbf/in^{2} (1.17 MPa)
- Heating surface
  - Firebox: 146.75 sq ft (13.634 m^{2})
  - Tubes: 276 in × 1 7/8 in (7,010 mm × 48 mm) outer dia. 1,806.5 sq ft (167.83 m^{2})
  - Total surface: 1,953.25 sq ft (181.463 m^{2})
- Cylinders: Two, inside
- Cylinder size: 20 1/2 in × 24 in (521 mm × 610 mm) [corrected from 26 in]
- Valve gear: Joy valve gear
Performance figures
- Tractive effort: 27,240 lbf (121.2 kN)
Career
- Operators: London and North Western Railway; London, Midland and Scottish Railway; British Railways
- Power class: LMS/BR: 6F
- First run: 1911
- Withdrawn: 1934–1953
- Disposition: All scrapped

The LNWR 1185 Class was a class of 0-8-2T steam tank locomotives designed by Charles Bowen-Cooke and introduced in 1911. They passed into LMS ownership in 1923 and 8 survived to British Railways ownership in 1948. British Railways numbers were 47875-47896 (with gaps).

== Career ==
30 engines, designed under the supervision of C J Bowen-Cooke, and built at Crewe during 1911–1917. Intended for duties formerly needing two locomotives. Essentially a tank version of the G class 0-8-0s. When introduced they had the then new style of 12 in (300 mm) letters for the company's initials on the tank sides. They were fitted with saturated "G" class boilers with lagged ends, round-top fireboxes, and sloping coal bunkers. The main wheels were coupled by three overlapping rods and the third pair of wheels were flangeless. Lever actuated Joy reversing gear appeared in-lieu of the normal Ramsbottom screw system. The earlier engines initially had slender tapered Cooke buffers but these were replaced by those of standard Webb pattern: The latter type was fitted from new on later engines. Braking was by steam, but vacuum brakes were provided to operate fitted or passenger stock if required.

LNWR/LMS stock list
LNWR No.	Crewe Works No.	Build date	LMS No. (Note: LMS numbers were applied piecemeal during 1925–1928 but not in the same sequence as construction.)	Withdrawn	Notes
1185	5040	December 1911	7870	December 1945	
1665	5041	December 1911	7872	October 1936	
1548	5042	December 1911	7871	May 1935	Briefly No. 1790.
289	5043	January 1912	7873	January 1935	
1163	5044	January 1912	7874	June 1935	
1494	5045	January 1912	7875	August 1948	
1592	5046	January 1912	7876	July 1947	
1659	5047	January 1912	7877	February 1953	(Note: Only these engines ever carried their post-1947 numbers [adding 40000 to those of the LMS].)
1663	5048	January 1912	7878	June 1947	
2013	5049	February 1912	7879	December 1936	
58	5247	August 1915	7882	October 1934	
482	5248	August 1915	7880	March 1937	
563	5249	August 1915	7881	July 1951	
736	5250	August 1915	7883	March 1935	
1090	5251	September 1915	7884	June 1951	
1124	5252	September 1915	7885	March 1950	
1414	5253	September 1915	7886	September 1948	
1514	5254	September 1915	7887	August 1948	
1515	5255	September 1915	7888	December 1948	
2277	5256	September 1915	7889	October 1934	
24	5357	December 1916	7890	June 1939	
92	5358	December 1916	7891	June 1946	
714	5359	January 1917	7892	February 1948	
1291	5360	January 1917	7893	October 1934	
1331	5361	January 1917	7894	September 1939	
2105	5362	January 1917	7895	October 1934	
2294	5363	January 1917	7896	November 1950	
2341	5364	February 1917	7897	June 1946	
2348	5365	February 1917	7898	January 1946	
2391	5366	February 1917	7899	August 1935	

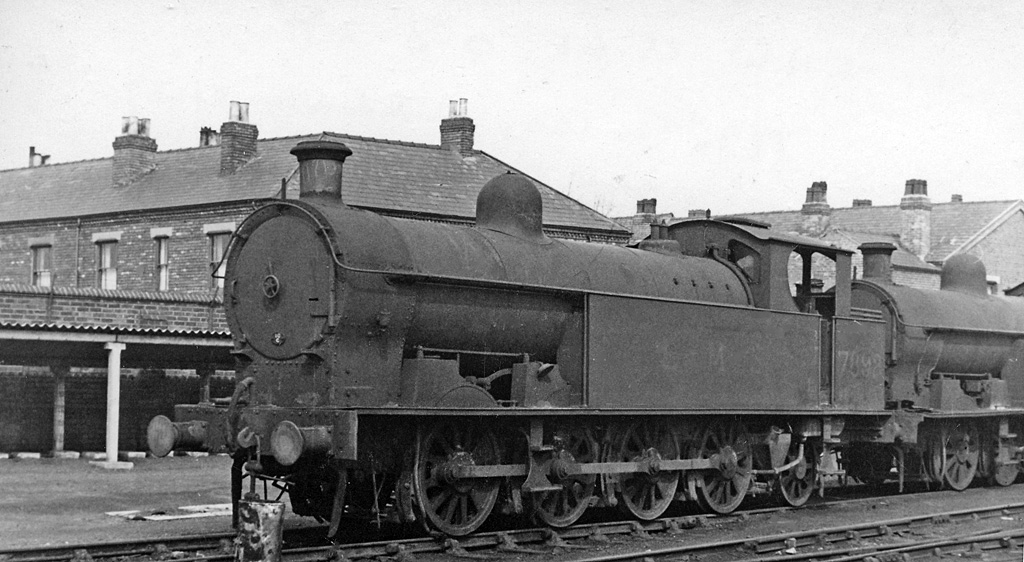
No. 7892 in 1948, heading a line of ex-LNWR locomotives awaiting scrap at Crewe Works

During the Depression years many of the class spent time in store for want of work and almost half were scrapped. Ten, however, survived to be taken into nationalised stock at the start of 1948.

No. 1090, as BR No. 47884, achieved the highest calculated service mileage of 732,425 mi or 1,178,724 km. Others ran 715,830 mi or 1,152,020 km (No. 47896), 701,005 mi or 1,128,158 km (No. 47877), 692,706 mi or 1,114,802 km (No. 47881) and 553,433 mi or 890,664 km (No. 7885).
