= LNWR Class G1 =

Class of two-cylinder 0-8-0 steam locomotives

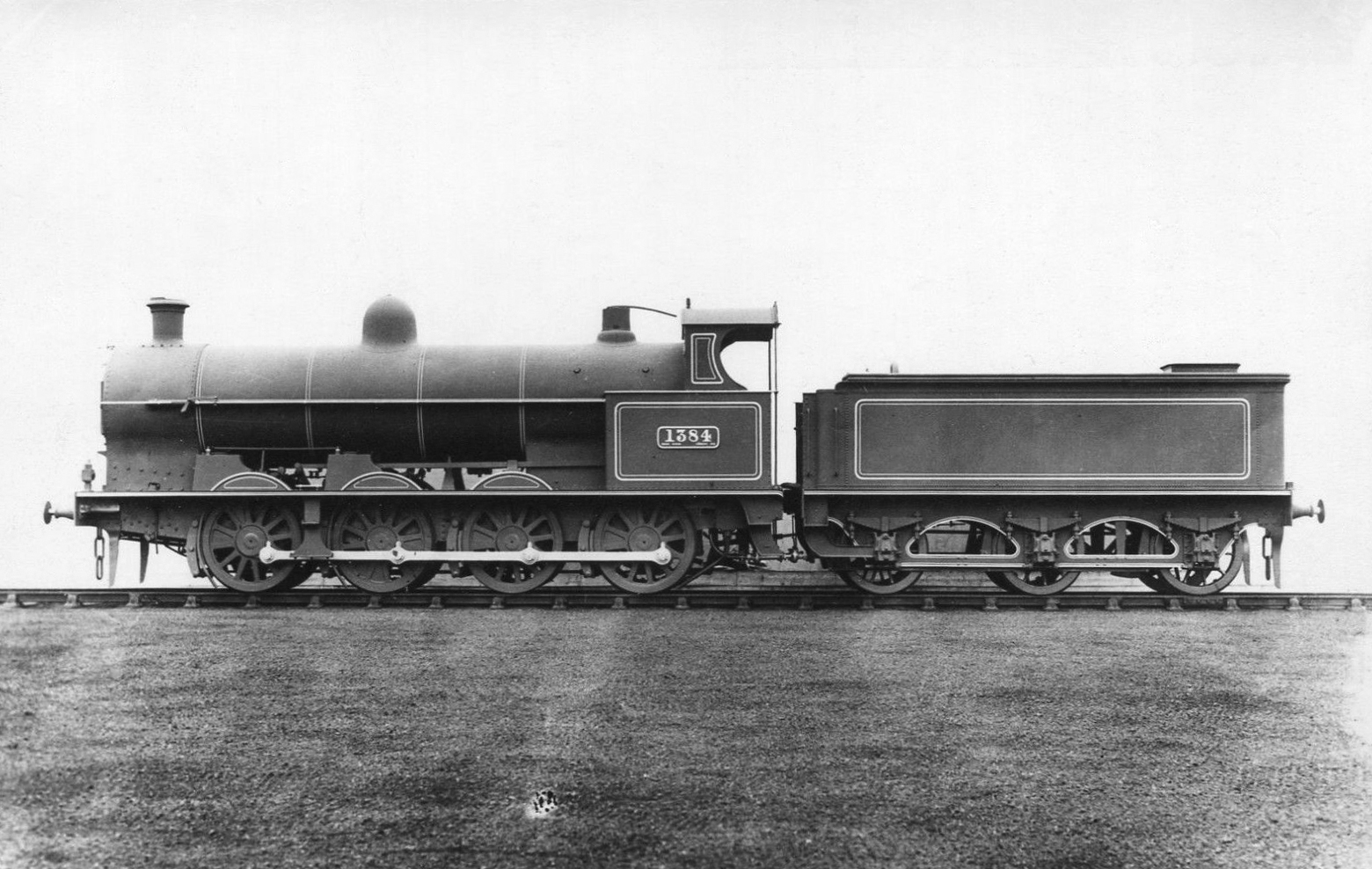
- No. 1384 in photographic grey livery
Type and origin
- Power type: Steam
- Designer: Charles Bowen Cooke
- Builder: Crewe Works
- Build date: 1901-1904
- Total produced: New builds: 170; Rebuilds: 278; Total: 448
- Rebuilder: Crewe Works
Specifications
- Configuration
  - Whyte: 0-8-0
  - UIC: D h2
- Gauge: 4 ft 8 1/2 in (1,435 mm)
- Driver dia.: 4 ft 5 1/2 in (1.359 m)
- Loco weight: 60 long tons 15 cwt (136,100 lb or 61.7 t)
- Fuel type: coal
- Boiler pressure: 160 psi (1.10 MPa)
- Cylinders: 2 inside
- Cylinder size: 20½" x 24"
Performance figures
- Tractive effort: 25,640 lbf (114.1 kN)
Career
- Operators: LNWR » LMS » BR
- Power class: BR, 6F
- Disposition: all scrapped

The London and North Western Railway (LNWR) Class G1 was a class of 0-8-0 steam locomotives. It was a superheated version of the LNWR Class G with 8 inch piston valves. The prototype was rebuilt in 1912 from No. 2653 of Class G and a further 170 new locomotives were built between 1912 and 1918. In addition, 277 older locomotives and a Class G2A locomotive were rebuilt to the G1 specification between 1917 and 1934.

== Numbering ==
Numbering is somewhat complicated. The LNWR used a numbering system based on the lowest available number, with the result that the numbers were scattered through the stock book. The London, Midland and Scottish Railway (LMS) renumbered the engines into a more logical series. However, they also then continued to rebuild engines, which retained the numbers originally assigned by the LMS. British Railways (BR) inherited 98 locomotives in 1948 and numbered them in the range 48892-49384. The number series is not continuous because some numbers in the same range were given to G2A Class locomotives.

== Construction and rebuilding list ==
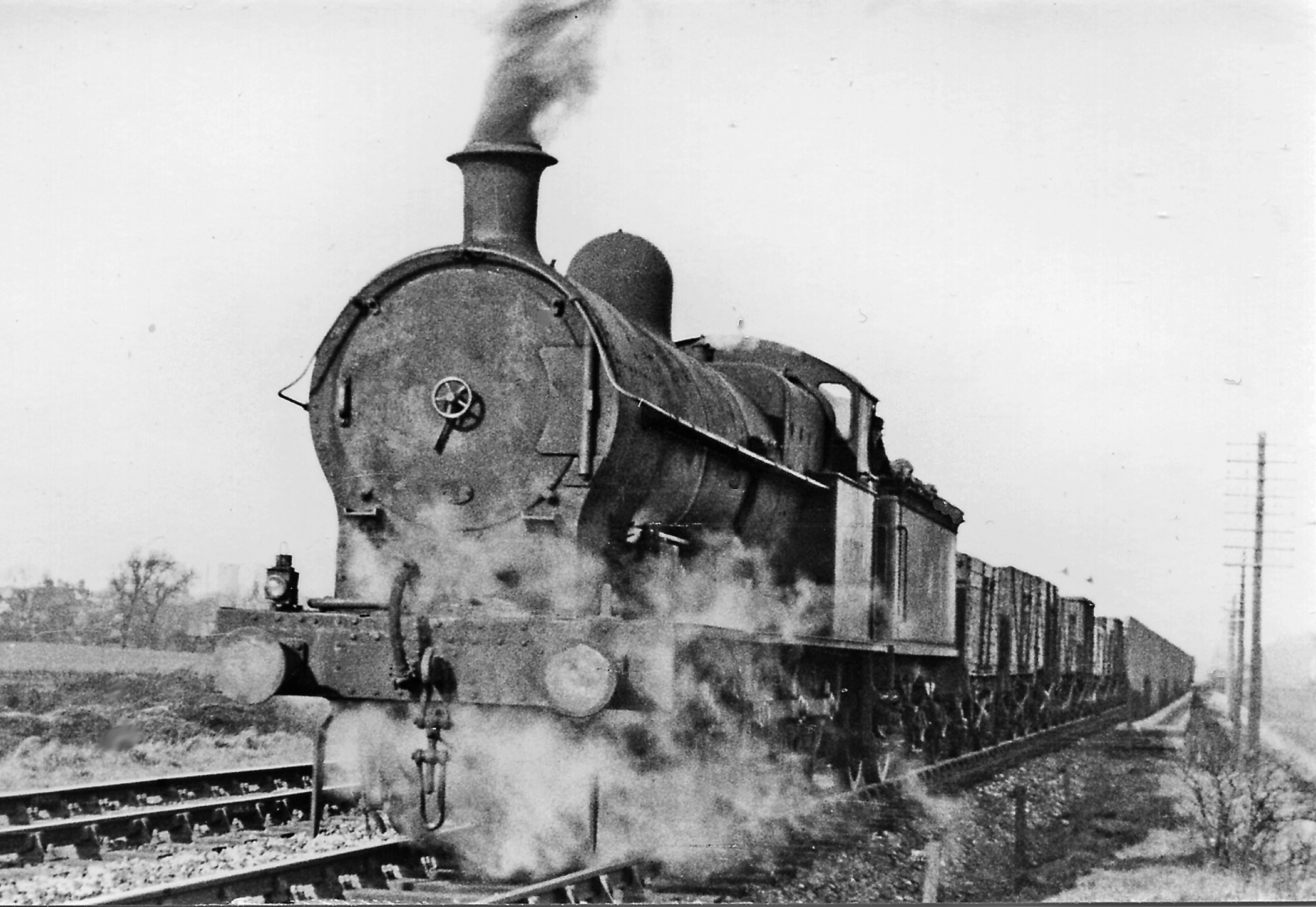
Ex-LMS No. 9171 - still unrenumbered in 1951, rebuilt as a G1 in May 1912 and withdrawn not long after this photograph in February 1952

Source	Dates (re)built	Total (re)built	(Re)built by LNWR	LNWR No(s)	Rebuilt by LMS	LMS No(s)	Notes
Prototype Class G	1912	1	1	2653	0	9154	
New construction	1912–1918	170	170	...	0	9155-9334	
Class B	1917–1927	91	46	?	45	8901…52, 9011, 9265, 9272/3, 9292, 9304/24, 9331…94	
Class E	1917–1924	18	12	...	6	...	
Class F	1921–1924	10	6	1036, 1038, 2570, 2114, 2573, 1369	4	9349/65/7/72/3/86.	
Class D	1925–1934	61	0	n/a	63	9002-64, except 9011/47	
Class C	1925–1927	5	0	n/a	5	8953/4/62/4/6	
Class G	1920–1937	91	0	n/a	91	9077-9144	
Class G2A	1933	1	0	n/a	1	9047	
Total:	1912–1934	448	237		211		

One was rebuilt back from Class G2A to Class G1 as it passed through heavy overhaul and received lower pressure boilers. Some were even purchased by the Railway Operating Division.
