= H. P. M. Beames =

Hewitt Pearson Montague Beames CBE (9 May 1875 – 5 March 1948) was Chief Mechanical Engineer of the London and North Western Railway from 1920 to 1922.

== Biography ==
Beames was born in Corfe, near Taunton, Somerset in 1875, son of Indian Army Officer Pearson Thomas Beames (1839-1899), and nephew of John Beames. Beames was educated at Corrig School, Kingstown, County Dublin, (now Dún Laoghaire), at Dover College, and Crawley's Military Academy. He then became an apprentice under, and pupil of, Francis William Webb at the Crewe works of the London and North Western Railway (LNWR).

A keen rugby union player, Beames played for Lancashire on several occasions, and was invited to tour Canada with the Irish national rugby union team, but was unable to go.

Between January 1900 and May 1901, Beames served in the cavalry in South Africa during the Boer War. He then resumed work at Crewe.

Between January 1902 and 1909, Beames was "Assistant to the Outdoor Superintendent, Crewe" who dealt with pumping, dredging and other dock machinery. From 1909 until the outbreak of the First World War in 1914, Beames was personal assistant to the Chief Mechanical Engineer (CME) Charles Bowen Cooke.

On the outbreak of war, Beames joined the Royal Engineers' Railway Company with the British Expeditionary Force until he was recalled to Crewe to become "Chief Assistant and Works Manager, Crewe Works". Beames became Deputy CME in June 1919 and CME in November 1920.

Beames only produced one new locomotive, the LNWR 380 Class 0-8-4T for use in South Wales. He also reboilered the LNWR Claughton Class locomotives.

The LNWR merged with the Lancashire and Yorkshire Railway (L&YR) in 1922 and the latter's CME, George Hughes was made CME of the now expanded LNWR, with Beames as "Divisional Mechanical Engineer, Western Division". The LNWR was then grouped in 1923 into the London, Midland and Scottish Railway (LMS) and Beames became "Mechanical Engineer, Crewe". Beames was overlooked in favour of the elderly Hughes for the top position of CME.

In December 1930 Beames was made Deputy Chief Mechanical Engineer, under Ernest Lemon headquartered at Derby. Lemon was quickly promoted and a new man William Stanier brought in.

Beames retired from the railway on 30 September 1934. He was then active in local politics and was appointed a CBE by George VI in the 1946 New Years Honours List for his services as Chairman of the Emergency Committee, County of Cheshire.

Preceded by Charles Bowen Cooke	Chief Mechanical Engineer of the London and North Western Railway; 1920–1922	Succeeded by George Hughes
