= LNWR Class G2 =

British steam locomotive class (1921–1964)

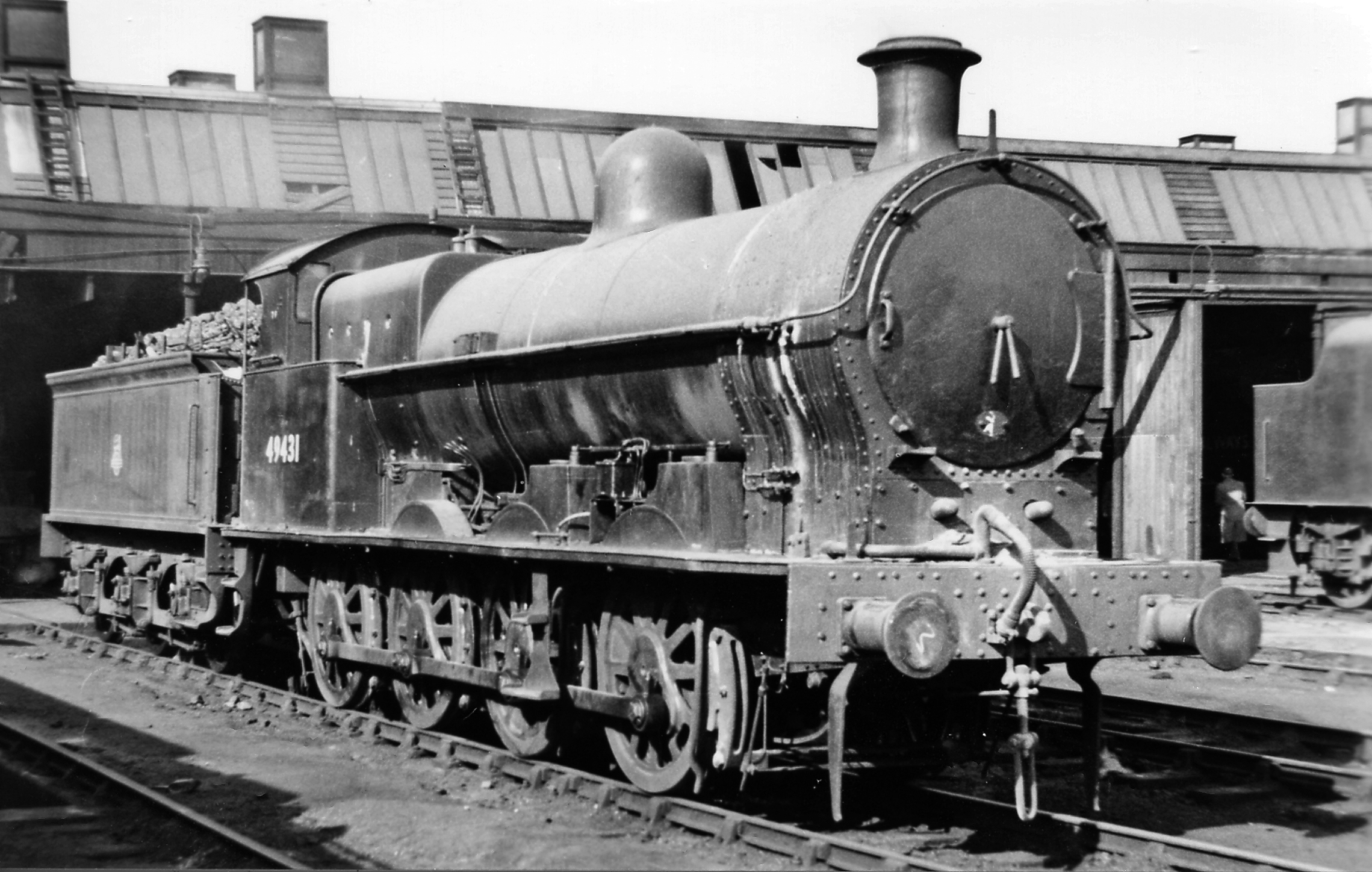
- G2 no. 49431 at Rugby Locomotive Depot in 1953
Type and origin
- Power type: Steam
- Designer: Beames
- Build date: 1921-1922
- Total produced: 60
Specifications
- Configuration
  - Whyte: 0-8-0
  - UIC: D h2
- Gauge: 4 ft 8 1/2 in (1,435 mm)
- Driver dia.: 4 ft 5 1/2 in (1.359 m)
- Loco weight: 62 long tons 0 cwt (138,900 lb or 63 t)
- Total weight: 102 long tons 16 cwt (230,300 lb or 104.4 t)
- Fuel type: Coal
- Fuel capacity: 6 long tons 0 cwt (13,400 lb or 6.1 t)
- Water cap.: 3,000 imp gal (14,000 L; 3,600 US gal)
- Boiler pressure: 175 psi (1.21 MPa)
- Cylinders: 2 inside
- Cylinder size: 20.5 in × 24 in (521 mm × 610 mm)
- Valve gear: Joy
- Valve type: Piston valves
- Loco brake: Steam
- Train brakes: Vacuum
Performance figures
- Tractive effort: 28,040 lbf (124.73 kN)
Career
- Operators: LNWR » LMS » BR
- Power class: BR, 7F
- Nicknames: Super D
- Withdrawn: 1959-1964
- Disposition: 1 preserved, remainder scrapped

The London and North Western Railway (LNWR) Class G2 is a class of 0-8-0 steam locomotives. 60 were built at Crewe Works in 1921–1922. Uniquely amongst classes of LNWR 8-coupled tender engines, they were not rebuilt from or into other classes. They were classified by the London, Midland and Scottish Railway (LMS) as 5, from 1928 7F.

== Numbering ==
The LNWR used a lowest available number numbering system, meaning that numbers were somewhat haphazard. After the grouping in 1923, the LMS renumbered them 9395-9454 in order of build date. All were inherited by British Railways (BR) upon nationalisation in 1948. BR added 40000 to their numbers so that they became 49395-49454.

== Withdrawal ==
The class were withdrawn between May 1959 and December 1964, with the first member of the class to be withdrawn being No. 49436 and the final being No. 49430.

Table of withdrawals
Year	Quantity in service at start of year	Number withdrawn	Quantity withdrawn	Locomotive numbers
1959	60	19	19	49395–98, 49400/09–10/17–20/24/27/29/35–36/42/45/50.
1960	41	0	19	–
1961	41	15	34	49399, 49401/05/11–14/21–23/33/41/43–44/53.
1962	21	20	54	49402–04/08/15–16/25–26/28/31–32/34/37–39/40/47/49/51–52.
1963	6	3	57	49406/48/54.
1964	3	3	60	49407/30/46

== Preservation ==
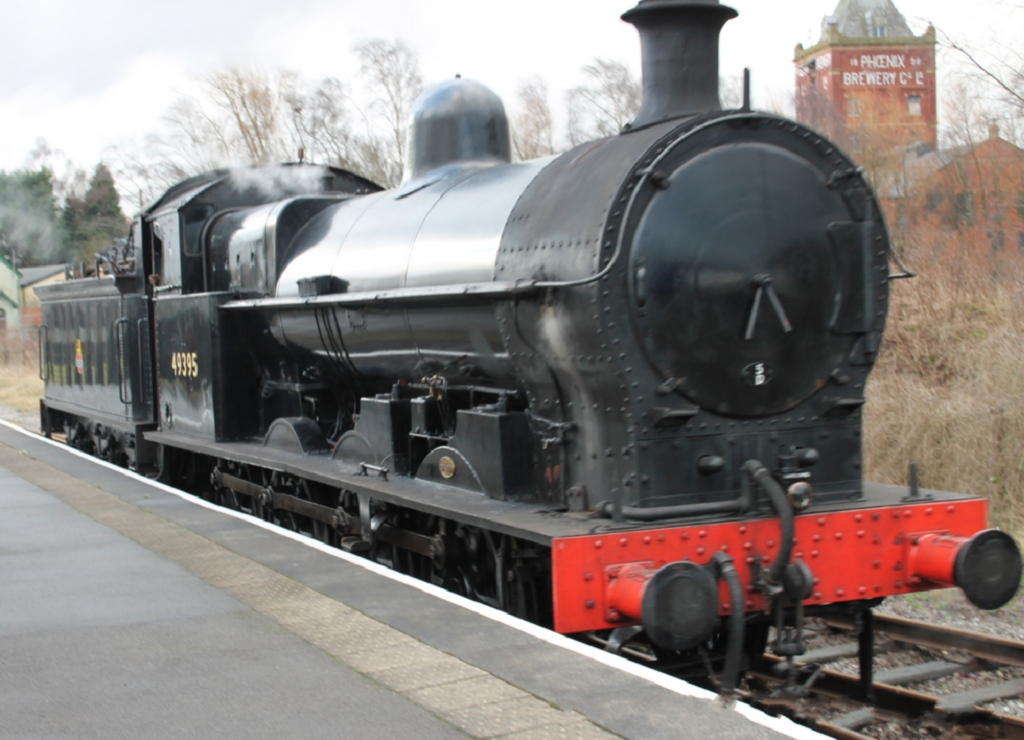
Preserved No. 49395 at the East Lancashire Railway, January 2012

The first of the class, LNWR No. 485, LMS No. 9395, BR No. 49395 has been preserved and is part of the National Collection at the NRM. It had previously spent time at the Ironbridge Gorge Museum Trust's Blists Hill Victorian Town.
