= George Whale =

British locomotive engineer (1842–1910)

- Born: 7 December 1842; Bocking, Essex, England
- Died: 7 March 1910 (aged 67); Hove, Sussex, England
- Engineering career
- Discipline: Mechanical engineering

George Whale (7 December 1842 – 7 March 1910) was an English locomotive engineer who was born in Bocking, Essex, and educated in Lewisham, London. He worked for the London and North Western Railway (LNWR).

== Career ==
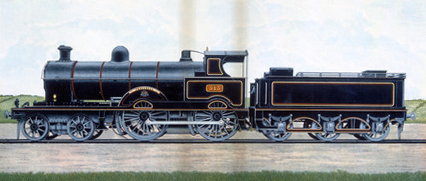
Alf Cooke print of Precursor Class engine No. 513

In 1858 he entered the LNWR's Wolverton Works under James Edward McConnell, and when in 1862 the LNWR Board decided to concentrate locomotive construction and repair at Crewe Works under John Ramsbottom, Whale was one of around 400 workers transferred from Wolverton to Crewe. In 1865 he entered the drawing office at Crewe Works, and in 1867 joined the LNWR running department under J. Rigg. In 1898 he was made responsible for the running of all LNWR locomotives.

Francis William Webb, the LNWR Locomotive Superintendent, gave twelve months notice of retirement to the LNWR Board in November 1902. On 22 April 1903, the Board announced that Whale had been chosen to succeed Webb, who was to retire at the end of July 1903. Webb's health was failing, and Whale soon took up some of his duties, and began signing official documents on 25 May; by 30 May, Webb was too ill to work.

Webb's compound locomotives were generally considered a failure and Whale commenced the programme of converting some of these to simple-expansion locomotives, and replacing others. In 1904 he introduced the 4-4-0 Precursor class, an entirely new design which was in production within nine months of Whale's appointment; by June 1906, there were 110 in service. The Precursors were able to keep time when handling greater loads than their predecessors. They were followed by the 4-6-0 Experiment class, and these two formed the basis for several subsequent LNWR locomotive classes.

=== Locomotives ===
Whale introduced four new classes of locomotive; a fifth design was ordered by Whale but not delivered until after his retirement.

| Class | Wheel arrangement | Years built | Number built | Notes |
|---|---|---|---|---|
| Precursor | 4-4-0 | 1904–07 | 130 | |
| Experiment | 4-6-0 | 1905–10 | 105 | |
| Precursor Tank | 4-4-2T | 1906–09 | 50 | |
| 19in Goods | 4-6-0 | 1906–09 | 170 | |
| Class G | 0-8-0 | 1910 | 60 | Ordered by Whale; delivered under Bowen Cooke. |

The Precursor class was developed by C.J. Bowen Cooke into the George the Fifth and Queen Mary classes, whilst the Experiment class was developed by Bowen Cooke into the Prince of Wales class.

Webb had built 282 freight locomotives of the 0-8-0 wheel arrangement. All except the first one were compounds, which were of two types: there were 111 with two high-pressure cylinders outside the frames and a single low-pressure cylinder between the frames, which were known as Class A from 1911; and there were 170 with two outside high-pressure cylinders and two inside low-pressure cylinders, which were later known as Class B. Production ended in August 1904, over a year after Whale had succeeded Webb.

Whale began rebuilding the Webb 0-8-0s in August 1904, and the alterations took several forms. The first to appear were converted from Class B, which Whale considered to have an excessive front overhang: the principal change was the addition of a pony truck, making a 2-8-0; they remained as four-cylinder compounds, and between August 1904 and October 1908, 36 locomotives were converted. 26 of these retained their original boilers and were later designated Class E; ten of those converted from May 1906 were provided with larger boilers (of the type used on the Experiment class) and were later designated Class F. Two of those initially converted to Class E were later given the larger boiler, and joined Class F.

The next conversions were from Class A, and were rebuilt as simples, retaining the 0-8-0 wheel arrangement: two inside cylinders were fitted in place of the original centre cylinder, and the outside cylinders were removed. Between November 1904 and March 1906, 15 locomotives were converted, using cylinders of 19 1/2 inches (500 mm) diameter; these retained their original boilers and were later designated Class C. Between March 1906 and March 1909, 62 locomotives were converted, these were also given 19 1/2-inch (500 mm) cylinders but were provided with larger (Experiment class) boilers and were later designated Class D. In December 1906 the original Webb 0-8-0, no. 2524 (which had never been a compound) was also given a large boiler and joined Class D. From March 1909 until September 1912, the last 34 conversions from Class A again retained their original boilers, but the new cylinders were of 18 1/2 inches (470 mm) diameter; they were later designated Class C1.

From November 1906, rebuilding of Class B as 0-8-0 simples began. The outside high-pressure cylinders were removed, whilst the former low-pressure inside cylinders were retained. Large (Experiment class) boilers were fitted, and these were later designated Class G. Conversions to Class G continued until June 1917, by which time 32 had been rebuilt; a further 60 to this design were built new between January and September 1910.

== Retirement and death ==
Whale's retirement was announced at the end of 1908, and on 1 March 1909, C.J. Bowen Cooke became Chief Mechanical Engineer. Whale died at Hove, Sussex on 7 March 1910, aged 67. Bowen Cooke named two of his 4-4-0 Queen Mary class locomotives after his predecessors: no. 238 F.W. Webb and no. 896 George Whale both entered service in October 1910. The latter was rebuilt to the George the Fifth class in January 1914, became LMS no. 5332 in November 1926, was allotted no. 25332 in 1934 (which was never applied), and was withdrawn on 29 February 1936.

== See also ==
- Locomotives of the London and North Western Railway

== Notes ==
| Preceded by Francis William Webb | Chief Mechanical Engineer of London and North Western Railway; 1903 – 1909 | Succeeded by Charles Bowen-Cooke |
