= Charles Bowen Cooke =

Charles John Bowen Cooke
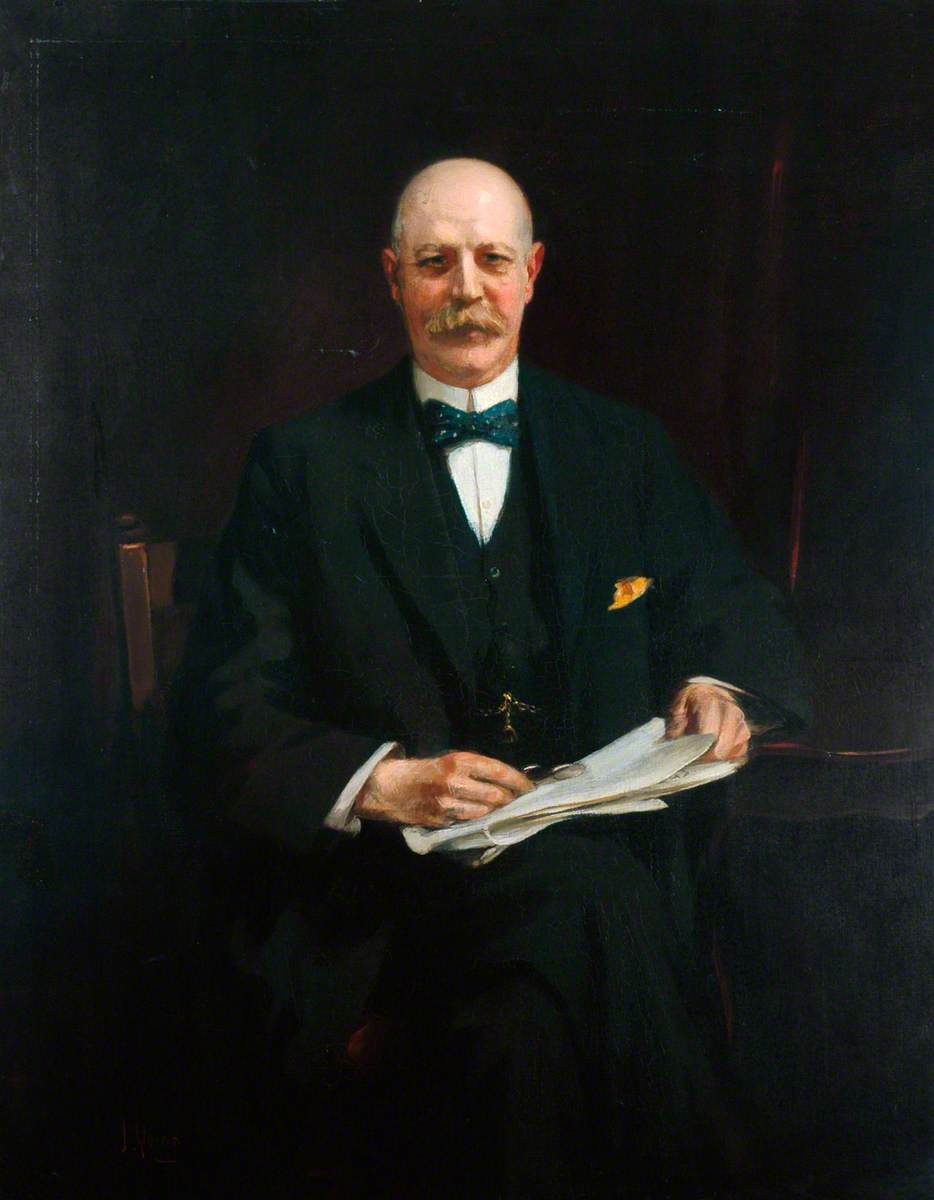
- by James Peter Quinn (1869–1951)
- Born: 11 January 1859; Orton Longueville, Huntingdonshire, England
- Died: 18 October 1920 (aged 61); Falmouth, Cornwall, England
- Citizenship: British
- Engineering career
- Discipline: Locomotive engineer
- Employer: London and North Western Railway
- Significant design: LNWR Claughton Class

Charles John Bowen Cooke CBE (11 January 1859 – 18 October 1920) was born in Orton Longueville (then in Huntingdonshire) and was Chief Mechanical Engineer (CME) of the London and North Western Railway (LNWR). He was the first to add superheating to the locomotives of the railway. He wrote a book called British locomotives: their history, construction; and modern development which was published in 1893, with a second edition in 1894, and third in 1899 A second book, Developments in Locomotive Practice followed in 1902.

Whilst CME of the LNWR he was responsible for the introduction of several new locomotive designs, including the George the Fifth and Claughton classes.

He was appointed a Commander of the Order of the British Empire in the 1918 New Year Honours for his efforts during the First World War.

He died on 18 October 1920 and is buried in the churchyard at St Just in Roseland, Cornwall.

== Locomotive designs ==
- LNWR George the Fifth Class 4-4-0
- LNWR Queen Mary Class 4-4-0
- LNWR Class G 0-8-0
- LNWR Class G1 0-8-0
- LNWR Claughton Class 4-6-0
- LNWR Prince of Wales Class 4-6-0
- LNWR 1185 Class 0-8-2T
- LNWR Prince of Wales Tank Class 4-6-2T

Preceded by George Whale	Chief Mechanical Engineer; London and North Western Railway; 1909–1920	Succeeded by H. P. M. Beames
