= LNWR Class G =

Class of British steam locomotives

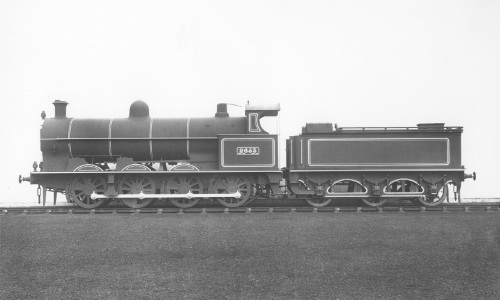
- No. 2653 in photographic grey livery
Type and origin
- Power type: Steam
- Designer: George Whale
- Builder: Crewe Works
- Build date: 1910
- Total produced: 60
- Rebuilder: Crewe Works
- Rebuild date: 1906–17
- Number rebuilt: 32 from Class B
Specifications
- Configuration
  - Whyte: 0-8-0
  - UIC: D n2
- Gauge: 4 ft 8 1/2 in (1,435 mm)
- Driver dia.: 4 ft 5.5 in (1.359 m)
- Fuel type: Coal
- Boiler pressure: 160 psi (1.10 MPa)
- Heating surface: 2,043.25 sq ft (189.824 m^{2})
- Cylinders: 2 inside
- Cylinder size: 20.5 by 24 inches (520 mm × 610 mm)
Career
- Operators: London and North Western Railway, London, Midland and Scottish Railway
- Disposition: 1 rebuilt to Class G1 1912; 91 rebuilt to Class G1 1920–37

The London and North Western Railway (LNWR) Class G were several related classes of 0-8-0 steam locomotives. These 0-8-0s were the principal engines for freight traffic on the latter-day London & North Western.

== History ==
32 of this class were rebuilt from 4-cylinder compound Class B between 1906 and 1917. The outside high-pressure cylinders were removed and the inside low-pressure cylinders were re-used, in their original position, to make a two-cylinder simple expansion engine. The boiler pressure was reduced from 200 psi to 160 psi to keep the tractive effort approximately the same. The rebuilt engines retained their old numbers. Additionally, 60 new Gs were built in 1910. The rebuilt engines were easily distinguished from the new builds by having "piano fronts".

== Rebuilding ==
The first of the class, LNWR No. 2653, was rebuilt to Class G1 in 1912. The remaining 91 engines were inherited by the LMS in 1923. LMS numbers were 9077-9144. The LMS rebuilt them all to Class G1 between May 1924 and 1937, thus rendering the class extinct.
