= Joy valve gear =

Valve gear for steam engines

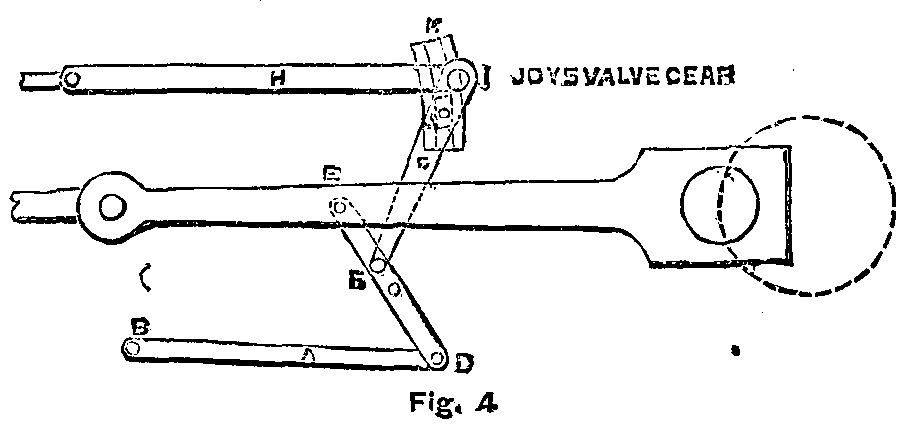
Joy Valve Gear Diagram

Joy valve gear is a type of steam locomotive valve gear, designed by David Joy (3 March 1825 – 1903), Locomotive and Marine engineer, and patented (no. 929) on 8 March 1879. His father, Edward was manager of oil seed crushing mills in Leeds. The British patent has not been found but the US patent (US252224 of 10 January 1882) has. Joy's gear is similar to Hackworth valve gear but has a compensating mechanism which corrects for "the slight inequality in the motion of the valve arising from the arc of the lever".

The drawing (right) shows the Joy gear as applied to a London and North Western Railway locomotive. The US patent shows several modifications of the gear. In figure 6 of the patent, one of the levers has been replaced by a slide.

On 10 January 1882, Mr. Joy received U.S. Patent No. 252,224 for the invention.

== Operation ==
The movement is derived from a vertical link connected to the connecting rod. The vertical movement is translated into the horizontal movement required by the valve spindle by a die block moving in a slide which can be varied in inclination. The necessary 90 degree phase shift is obtained not from an eccentric, as with most designs, but from both the nominal 90 degree difference of the "vertical" link with respect to the horizontal connecting rod and the 90 degree phase difference between the horizontal and vertical components of the motion of the connecting rod.

== Applications ==
Joy's valve-gear was used extensively on Lancashire and Yorkshire Railway and London and North Western Railway locomotives, and also on the Manning Wardle-built narrow gauge 2-6-2 locomotives of the Lynton and Barnstaple Railway. Joy gear was also used by John Fowler & Co. and several other steam traction engine manufacturers. The most numerous locomotive class using Joy valve gear was Russian O class, in O^{d} and O^{D} variants (over 4,500 built) - a letter "d" / "D" in their designations stood for Joy (in Russian phonetically: Джой - Dzhoy). Joy's valve gear was used in the Doble steam car until replaced by Stephenson's valve gear.

== Preservation ==
The last locomotives with Joy valve gear to remain in service with British Railways were the LNWR G2 and G2A Classes, of which one of the former class is preserved.

== Greenly-Joy valve gear ==
There is a modified Joy gear designed by Henry Greenly for miniature railway steam locomotives.
