= Locomotives of the London and North Western Railway =

Locomotives of the London and North Western Railway. The London and North Western Railway (LNWR) Locomotive Department was headquartered at Crewe from 1862. The Crewe Works had been built in 1840–43 by the Grand Junction Railway (GJR).

== Locomotives inherited from constituent companies ==
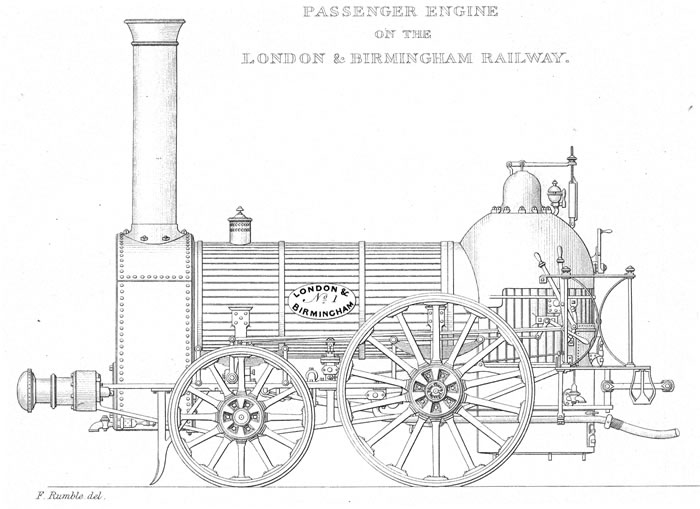
Bury 2-2-0 passenger engine for the London and Birmingham Railway

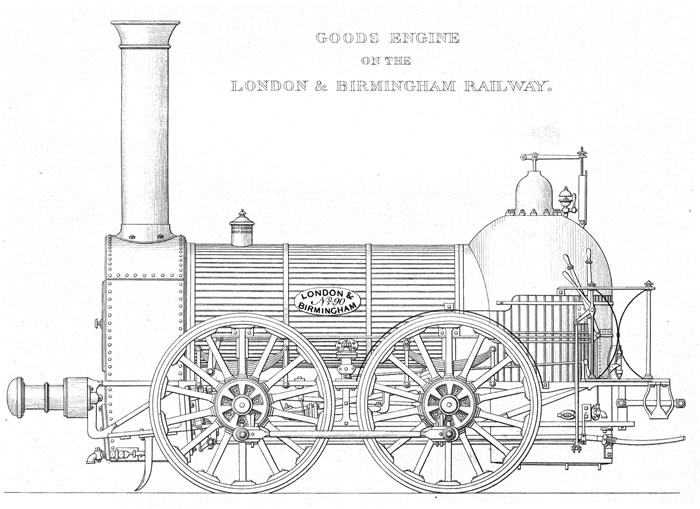
Bury 0-4-0 goods engine for the London and Birmingham Railway

The LNWR was formed in 1846 with the merger of the Grand Junction Railway, the London and Birmingham Railway (L&BR) and the Manchester and Birmingham Railway (M&BR).

The GJR and the Liverpool and Manchester Railway (LMR) initially had their workshops at Edge Hill. The London and Birmingham workshops were at Wolverton. The Grand Junction built a new works at Crewe Works which opened in 1843, while the Manchester and Birmingham's works was at Longsight.

While the GJR and M&BR locos were mainly by Robert Stephenson and Sharp Brothers, the L&B's were mostly "Bury" types – indeed Edward Bury was its locomotive superintendent. On the GJR, breakages of the inside-cylinder engines' crank axles led to the redesign of several with outside cylinders under locomotive superintendent Francis Trevithick. These later became known as the "Old Crewe" types.

After the creation of the LNWR in 1846, Crewe and Wolverton became headquarters of the Northern and Southern Divisions respectively, with Longsight as the headquarters of the North Eastern Division.

In 1922, the LNWR merged with the Lancashire and Yorkshire Railway (LYR) and the North London Railway (NLR) to form a larger company still called the LNWR.

See:

- Locomotives of the Lancashire and Yorkshire Railway
- Locomotives of the North London Railway

== LNWR Northern Division ==
The first Northern Division Locomotive Superintendent (at Crewe Works) was Francis Trevithick, son of Richard Trevithick, who continued to build the basic 2-2-2 and 2-4-0 designs. Alexander Allan was Works Manager at Crewe from 1843 to 1853.

- 4-2-2 Cornwall (1847)

In 1857, the North Eastern Division locomotive department, with headquarters at Longsight, was absorbed into that of the Northern Division. Trevithick was dismissed and returned to Cornwall with an honorarium, and was replaced at Crewe by John Ramsbottom as Northern Division Superintendent. Ramsbottom began to standardise and modernise the locomotive stock, initially replacing the 2-4-0 goods engines with his "DX" 0-6-0, of which over 900 were built at Crewe from 1858 to 1872.

All LNWR locomotives were painted black from 1873; for many years the goods engines were plain black, but passenger engines were given red, white and blue-grey lining, and most goods engines were similarly lined from the 1890s. Before 1873 locomotives had been green with black lines, and this seems to have been the normal livery from London & Birmingham and Grand Junction times.

=== John Ramsbottom (1857–1871) ===
Image	Class	Type	Quantity	Manufacturer	Date	LMS Classification	LMS Numbers	Notes
	No. 173 Cornwall	2-2-2	1	Crewe Works	1847/1858	—	—	Originally built as 4-2-2; rebuilt in 1858 as 2-2-2
	271	0-6-0	7	Sharp, Stewart & Co.	1857	—	—	
	DX	0-6-0	943 (including 86 for the L&YR)	Crewe Works	1858–72	—	—	500 later rebuilt as 'Special DX'
	D	0-6-0	1	Longsight Works	1859	—	—	
	Ostrich	0-6-0	2	Beyer, Peacock & Co.	1859	—	—	
	Problem	2-2-2	60	Crewe Works	1859–65	—	—	Also called Lady of the Lake class
	Crewe Works Railway	0-4-0T	7	Crewe Works	1862–1875	—	—	18-inch gauge. Named Tiny, Pet, Nipper, Topsy, Midge, Dickie, and Billie.
	Wolverton Express Goods	0-6-0	10	Wolverton Works	1863	—	—	McConnell design, last to be built at Wolverton
	4ft Shunter	0-4-0ST	36	Crewe Works	1863–70	—	7206-7210	835
	Samson	2-4-0	90	Crewe Works	1863–79	—	—	
	Newton	2-4-0	96	Crewe Works	1866–73	—	—	All 'renewed' as "Renewed Precedent" class
	Special Tank	0-6-0ST	260	Crewe Works	1870–80	1F	7220–7457	
	Metropolitan Tank	4-4-0T	16	Beyer, Peacock & Co.	1871–72	—	—	Built by Beyer-Peacock. Same design as used by Metropolitan. 10 rebuilt as 4-4-2T and one as compound (see below)

=== Francis Webb (1871–1903) ===
Image	Class	Type	Quantity	Manufacturer	Date	LMS Classification	LMS Numbers	Notes
	B	2-2-0ST	1	Edward Bury & Co. Crewe Works	1835–76	—	—	Worked C&HPR from 1835 to 1873; Crewe Works until scrapped May 1876
	1201	0-4-0ST	10	Crewe Works	1872	—	7211–7212	
	17in Coal Engine	0-6-0	499	Crewe Works	1873–92	2F	8088-8314	45 rebuilt as pannier-tanks (see below)
	Precursor	2-4-0	40	Crewe Works	1874–79	—	—	
	Precedent	2-4-0	70	Crewe Works	1875–82		5000-5003	62 'renewed' and 8 rebuilt as "Renewed Precedent" class
	2234	2-4-0T	50	Crewe Works	1876–80	1P	6420–6434	nicknamed "Chopper Tanks"
	4ft 6in Tank	2-4-2T	220	Crewe Works	1879–98	1P	6515–6600	
	18in Goods	0-6-0	310	Crewe Works	1880–1902	2F	8315–8624	Nicknamed "Cauliflowers"
	2360	0-4-0WT	10	Crewe Works	1880–82	—	7200–7205	Double-ended, oil-fired dock shunters; 4 engines used as service stock
	Coal Tank	0-6-2T	300	Crewe Works	1881–97	1F	7550–7841	
	Special DX	0-6-0	500	Crewe Works	1881–98	?	8000–8087	Rebuilds of DX
	Experiment	2-2-2-0	30	Crewe Works	1882–84	—	—	3-cylinder Compound
	No. 2062	4-2-2-0	1	Crewe Works	1884	—	—	3-cylinder Compound rebuild of Metropolitan tank
	Dreadnought	2-2-2-0	40	Crewe Works	1884–88	—	—	3-cylinder Compound
	No. 687	2-2-2-2T	1	Crewe Works	1885	—	—	3-cylinder Compound "Fore-and-Aft"
	No. 600	2-2-2-2T	1	Crewe Works	1887	—	—	3-cylinder Compound
	No. 777	2-2-4-0T	1	Crewe Works	1887	—	—	3-cylinder Compound
	Renewed Precedent	2-4-0	158	Crewe Works	1887–1901	1P	5004–5079	Nominal renewals of 96 Newtons & 80 Precedents
	Teutonic	2-2-2-0	10	Crewe Works	1889–90	—	—	3-cylinder Compound
	Waterloo	2-4-0	90	Crewe Works	1889–96	1P	5080–5109	Also known as Whitworth Class
	5′ 6″ Tank	2-4-2T	160	Crewe Works	1890–97	1P	6601–6757	
	1201	0-4-0ST	10	Crewe Works	1892	—	7213–7216	3 rebuilt as 0-4-2T Crane Tanks
	Metropolitan Tank	4-4-2T	10	Crewe Works	1892	—	—	Rebuilds of Metropolitan 4-4-0T above
	No.2524	0-8-0	1	Crewe Works	1892	—	—	Basis of "C" class, later rebuilt as D, then G1.
	Greater Britain	2-2-2-2	10	Crewe Works	1892–94	—	—	3-cylinder Compound
	A	0-8-0	111	Crewe Works	1893–1900	—	—	3-cylinder Compound, all rebuilt as C (15), C1 (34) or D (62)
	835	0-4-2WT	5	Crewe Works	1894	—	—	Crane Tank
	John Hick	2-2-2-2	10	Crewe Works	1894–98	—	—	3-cylinder Compound
	317	0-4-2ST	20	Crewe Works	1896–1901	1P	6400-6419	also known as "Dock Tank" or "Bissel Tank"
	Iron Duke	4-4-0	1	Crewe Works	1897	—	—	Initially 4-cylinder simple, converted to Compound, then to "Renown"
	Black Prince	4-4-0	1	Crewe Works	1897	—	—	4-cylinder Compound, rebuilt as "Renown"
	18in Tank	0-6-2T	80	Crewe Works	1898–1902	1P	6860-6936	
	Jubilee	4-4-0	40	Crewe Works	1897–1900	2P	5110-5117	4-cylinder Compound, all but 3 rebuilt as "Renown"s
	Alfred the Great	4-4-0	40	Crewe Works	1901–03	2P	5118-5130	4-cylinder Compound, 33 rebuilt as 'Renown'
	B	0-8-0	170	Crewe Works	1901–04	3F	8900-8952	4-cylinder Compound, most rebuilt as E (26), F (10), G (32) or G1 (91)
	1400	4-6-0	30	Crewe Works	1903–05	—	—	4-cylinder Compound, nicknamed "Bill Baileys", all scrapped before grouping

=== George Whale (1903–1909) ===
Image	Class	Type	Quantity	Manufacturer	Date	LMS Classification	LMS Numbers	Notes
	C	0-8-0	15	Crewe Works	1904–06	4F	8953–8967	Simple rebuilds of Class A, 5 rebuilt as G1
	E	2-8-0	26	Crewe Works	1904–07	3F	9600–9609	Rebuilds of Class B, small boiler, 2 rebuilt as F, 18 as G1.
	F	2-8-0	12	Crewe Works	1904–07	3F	9610–9615	Rebuilds of Class B (10) and E (2), large boiler. 10 later rebuilt as G1
	Precursor	4-4-0	130	Crewe Works	1904–07	2P/3P	5187–5319	Many later equipped with superheaters
	Square Saddle Tank	0-6-0ST	45	Crewe Works	1905–07	1F	7458–7502	Rebuilds of Coal (tender) engines
	Experiment	4-6-0	105	Crewe Works	1905–10	3P	5450–5554	
	D	0-8-0	63	Crewe Works	1906–09	4F	9002–9064	Simple rebuilds of Class A and no.2524. All later rebuilt as G1
	Precursor Tank	4-4-2T	50	Crewe Works	1906–09	2P	6780–6829	
	19in Goods	4-6-0	170	Crewe Works	1906–09	4F	8700–8869	
	Renown	4-4-0	70	Crewe Works	1908–24	2P	5131–5186	Simple rebuilds of 'Jubilee' & 'Alfred the Great' classes
	C1	0-8-0	34	Crewe Works	1909	3F	8968–9001	Simple rebuilds of Class A

=== Charles John Bowen Cooke (1909–1920) ===
With a reasonably comprehensive fleet, Bowen Cooke arranged exchanges with other railways in 1909 and 1910 to assess the scope for improvements, among which was superheating.

Image	Class	Type	Quantity	Manufacturer	Date	LMS Classification	LMS Numbers	Notes
	George the Fifth	4-4-0	90	Crewe Works	1910–15	3P	5320–5409	Superheated, 80 original, 10 conversions of 'Queen Mary's
	Queen Mary	4-4-0	10	Crewe Works	1910	—	—	All later converted to George the Fifth class
	G	0-8-0	92	Crewe Works	1910	4F	9065–9153	60 new, 32 rebuilds of B. All rebuilt as G1
	2665	4-6-2T	47	Crewe Works	1910–16	3P	6950–6996	12 built saturated, later had superheaters added, remainder began superheated. Nicknamed ‘Prince of Wales Tank’
	Prince of Wales	4-6-0	246	Crewe Works (135); North British Loco (20); Wm Beardmore & Co. (91)	1911–24	3P	5600–5845	Superheated
	1185	0-8-2T	30	Crewe Works	1911–17	4F	7870–7899	
	G1	0-8-0	449	Crewe Works	1912–18	6F	9154–9394	Superheated, boiler 160 psi. 170 new, remainder rebuilt from B (91), C (5), D (63), E (18), F (10), G (92)
	Claughton	4-6-0	130	Crewe Works	1913–21	5P	5900–6029	Superheated, 42 later 'renewed' as Patriots by LMS
	MM	2-8-0	30	R. Stephenson & Co. (2); North British Loco (28)	1919	7F	9616–9645	Robinson ROD type. Bought from the government. Another 151 on hire, but returned.

=== H. P. M. Beames (1920–1922) ===
Image	Class	Type	Quantity	Manufacturer	Date	LMS Classification	LMS Numbers	Notes
	G2	0-8-0	60	Crewe Works	1921–22	7F	9395–9454	Superheated, boiler 175 psi. All new engines
	380	0-8-4T	30	Crewe Works	1923–24	5F	7930–7959	Superheated

=== George Hughes (1922) ===
In 1922, the LNWR merged with the Lancashire and Yorkshire Railway (L&YR) to form a larger company still called the LNWR. George Hughes, formerly CME of the L&YR became CME of the LNWR. A year later the enlarged company was grouped into the LMS, and Hughes became CME of the new railway.

== LNWR Southern Division ==
The first Southern Division Locomotive Superintendent was Edward Bury who had been in charge of the London and Birmingham Railway locomotive department at Wolverton since before that railway opened. He resigned in 1847 and later became General Manager of the Great Northern Railway. His successor at Wolverton was James McConnell who had previously worked for the Birmingham and Gloucester Railway at their Bromsgrove works. Among the classes built under his superintendence were the very successful 2-2-2 "Bloomers", developed from a Bury design, and the Wolverton Express Goods 0-6-0 class, built from 1854 to 1863. The Southern Division's trains were longer and heavier, and 0-6-0 locos had been introduced as early as 1845.

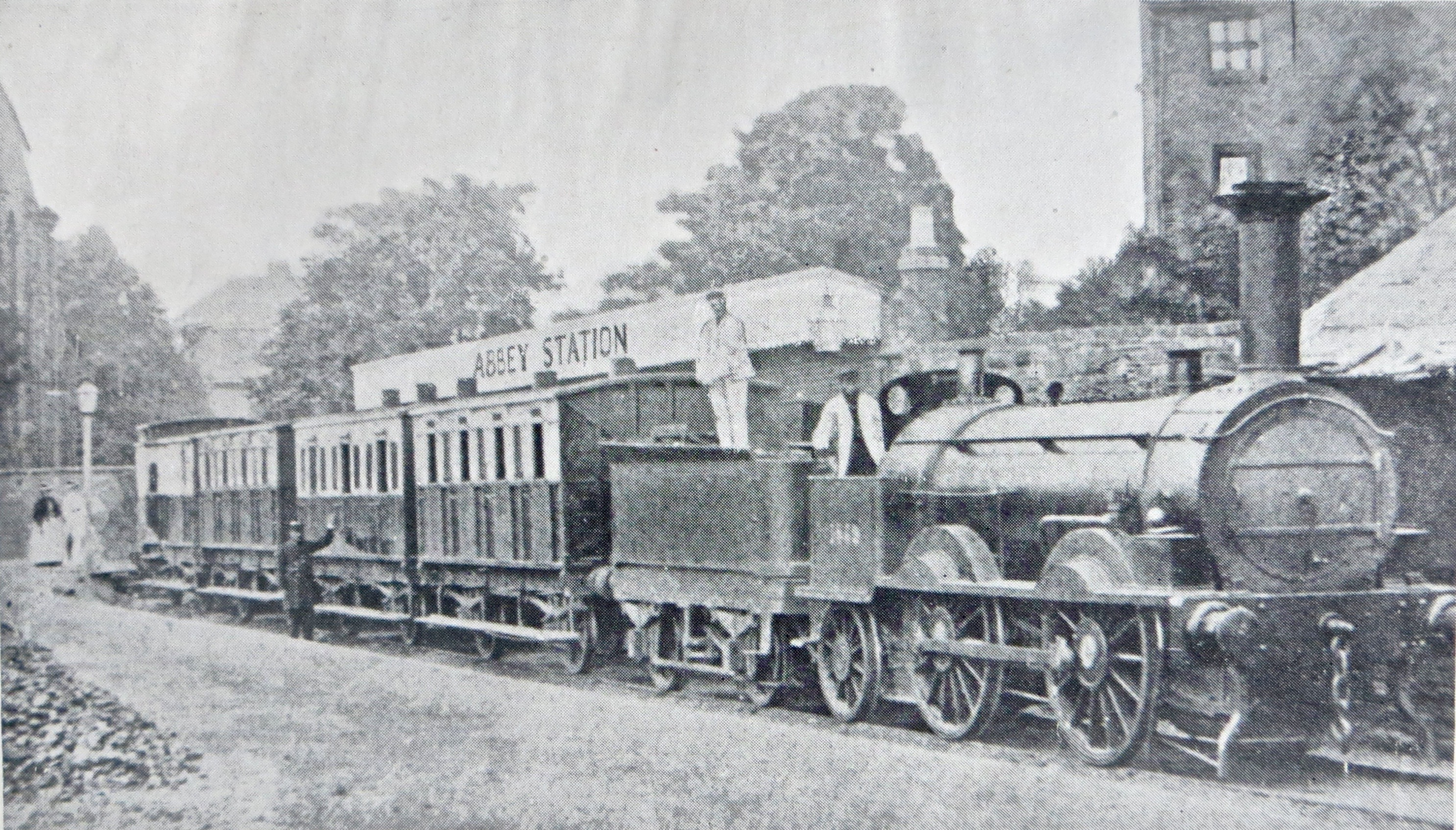
Bury, Curtis and Kennedy 0-4-2 locomotive. Six were built in 1847/8 for the LNWR (Southern Division) with 16 in. x 24 in. cylinders, 5 ft. driving wheels, and 3 ft. 4 in. trailing wheels.

There were distinct differences between the Southern and Northern Division locomotive policies. Wolverton had been set up in 1838 for repair work only, the locomotives being purchased from outside firms, whereas Crewe, from its foundation in 1843, was a locomotive-building works. Only a dozen locomotives were built at Wolverton from 1845 to the end of 1854, but in the following year construction started in earnest, and another 154 were completed in 1855–1863. The Southern Division engines were bigger, heavier and more expensive than those of the Northern Division, and after a disagreement with the cost-conscious Chairman, Richard Moon, in 1862 McConnell was obliged to resign. The Southern and Northern locomotive departments were amalgamated, and John Ramsbottom became Locomotive Superintendent of the entire LNWR, his headquarters remaining at Crewe. Locomotive building and repairing were gradually run down at Wolverton, which became the LNWR's carriage works in 1865.

In the 1850s on the Southern Division, McConnell had some of his express engines painted green with more elaborate patterns of lining in various colours, and in 1861–62 a few Southern Division engines were painted a very dark plum-red. The widespread belief that McConnell's engines were painted vermilion is incorrect, despite its constant repetition.

== Locomotives of the North London Railway ==
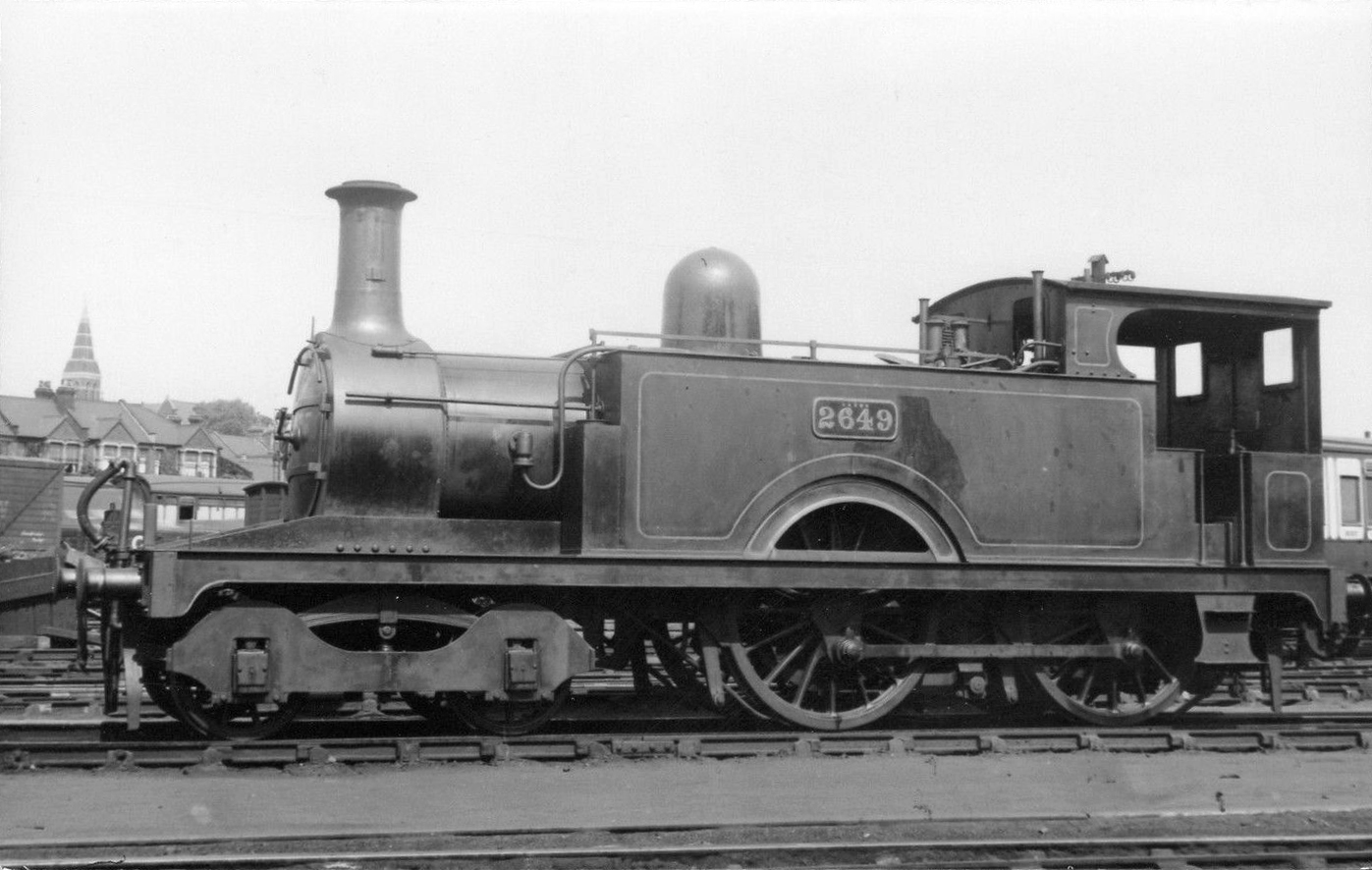
No. 2649 Adams 4-4-0T (inside cylinders)

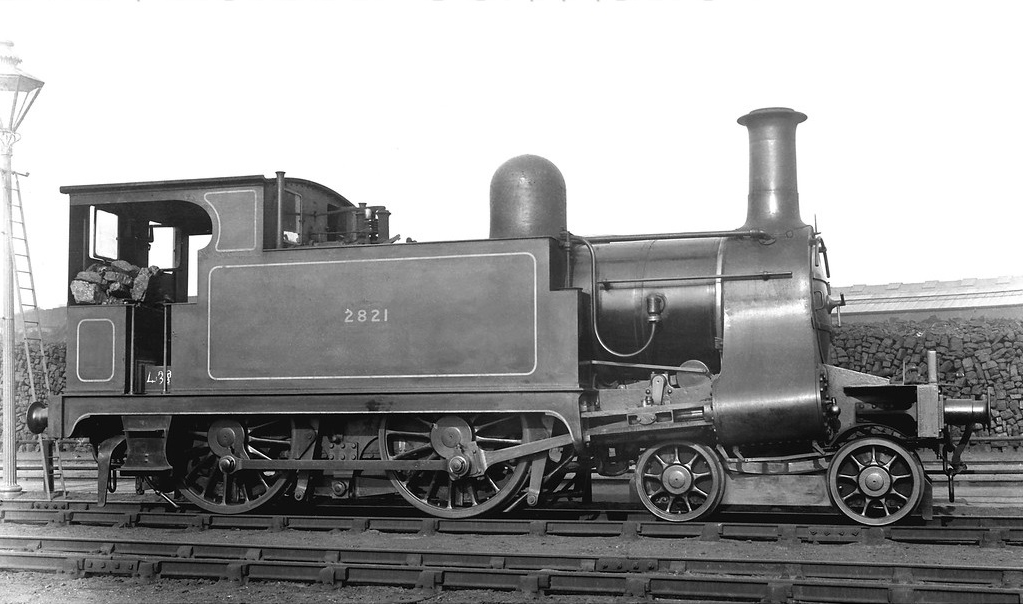
No. 2821 Adams 4-4-0T (outside cylinders)

In the early days, locomotives were bought from outside builders but, from 1863, they were built in the North London Railway's workshops at Bow, London.

=== William Adams (1854–1873) ===
- 4-4-0T (16" inside cylinders) built 1863–1865
- 4-4-0T (17" inside cylinders) built 1865–1869
- 4-4-0T (17" outside cylinders) built 1868–1876
- 4-4-0T (17½" outside cylinders) built 1876–?

=== John C. Park (1873–1893) ===
- 0-6-0T (17" outside cylinders) built 1879-1905

== Influence on LMS policy ==
Crewe's influence on the locomotives of the London, Midland and Scottish Railway was less than that of its great rival the Midland Railway. However, the LMS did produce an unsuccessful "Midlandised" version of the G class 0-8-0s, see LMS Class 7F 0-8-0.

== Preservation ==
Preserved L&NWR locomotives are:

Image	LNWR No.	LNWR class	Type	Manufacturer	Serial No.	Date	Notes
	116	—	0-4-2	Todd, Kitson and Laird	—	1838	ex Liverpool and Manchester Railway 57 Lion; static display, Museum of Liverpool
	1868	—	2-2-2	Crewe Works	—	1845	ex Grand Junction Railway 49 Columbine; static exhibit, National Railway Museum, York
	3020; Cornwall	—	2-2-2	Crewe Works	—	1847	Static exhibit; National Collection, Shildon
	Pet	Crewe Works Railway	0-4-0ST	Crewe Works	—	1865	18-inch gauge; static exhibit; National Collection, York
	1439	835	0-4-0ST	Crewe Works	842	1865	Renumbered 1985 in 1885 and 3042 in 1891, sold to industry. To Staffordshire County Museum
	2650	NLR Class 75	0-6-0T	Bow Works	181	1880	ex North London Railway 116, née 76; acquired 1909. Became LMS 7505, 27505 from 1934; BR 58850. Awaiting overhaul at Bluebell Railway
	1054	Coal; Tank	0-6-2T	Crewe Works	2979	1888	LMS 7799, BR 57926;
	790; Hardwicke	Renewed; Precedent	2-4-0	Crewe Works	3286	1892	LMS 5031; static exhibit; National Collection, Shildon
	485	G2	0-8-0	Crewe Works	5662	1921	LMS 9395

A full-size working replica of an LNWR Bloomer Class locomotive, to be numbered 670, was begun at Tyseley in 1986, was 90% completed by 1990, but has never been finished (2022).

A full-size static replica of the same type was built in Milton Keynes, and was exhibited outside the station there from 1991; it was later moved to the Milton Keynes Museum.

A full-size working replica of a LNWR George the Fifth Class was started in 2014, to be numbered and named 2013 Prince George, is still under construction as of 2023.

A miniature one-sixth scale locomotive 'Orion' was built by G R S Darroch during his time at Crewe Works. It is based on the LNWR Alfred the Great Class and is the only surviving Crewe built Webb Compound. (Completed circa 1910–12) The locomotive is in the ownership of the Stephenson Locomotive Society and currently based at Shildon Locomotion Museum.

Preserved L&YR locomotives can be found on their own page.
