= Wigan Springs Branch TMD =

Railway maintenance depot in Ince in Makerfield, Greater Manchester

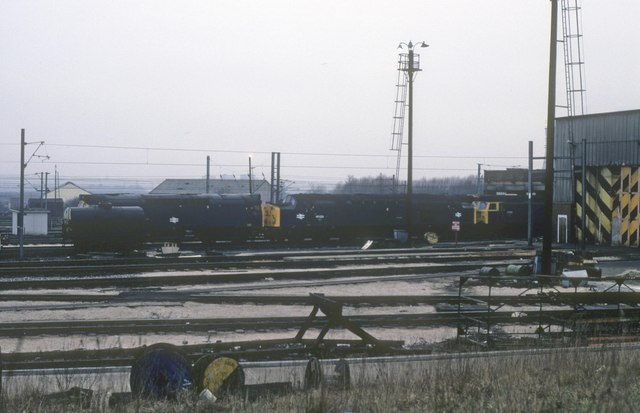
- Springs Branch depot in February 1981
- Interactive map of Wigan Springs Branch TMD

Location
- Location: Ince in Makerfield, Greater Manchester
- Coordinates: 53.5289°N 2.6154°W
- OS grid: SD593037

Characteristics
- Owner: Network Rail
- Depot code: SP (1973–)
- Type: DMU and EMU
- Rolling stock: Current: Class 158; Class 195; Class 319; Class 769

History
- Former depot code: 25 (circa 1870–1935); 10A (1935–1958); 8F (1958–1973)

Wigan Springs Branch TMD is a traction maintenance depot located in Ince-in-Makerfield, England. There has been a motive power depot (engine shed or locomotive depot) in the area of the current depot since the 1840s.

== Current usage, since 2018 ==
The depot was rebuilt between 2018 and 2020, re-opening on 7 February 2020 as a facility able to stable and service 24 electric and eight diesel trains operated by Northern Trains.

== History ==
The depot has gone through several rebuilds, they have all been situated near the junction between the modern West Coast Main Line and the former London and North Western Railway (L&NWR) Springs branch about 2 km (1.2 mi) south of Wigan North Western.

=== Before 1870 ===
The first locomotive shed in this area was opened by the London and North Western Railway (L&NWR) around 1847, shortly after the line, which was originally the North Union Railway, was leased jointly by the London and North Western Railway and the Manchester and Leeds Railway (M&LR). (Note: There were two earlier Wigan sheds, one built by the WBR (or the Liverpool and Manchester Railway who operated the WBR) near Wigan Chapel Lane and one by the NUR closer to Wigan North Western.)

The original building was a brick built 2 track straight through shed located to the north of the later sheds at 53°31′53″N 2°36′58″W, the shed was on the inside of the Springs branch curve. There was a coaling stage next to the shed and a turntable located in the 'V' of junction between the main line into Wigan and the Springs branch. The shed had a capacity of 6 locomotives. In 1864, a temporary, timber built 1 track straight shed was added a little south of the first shed.

=== 1869 to 1882 ===
In 1869, after representations by the Chief Mechanical Engineer, John Ramsbottom, a new brick built 8 track straight dead-ended shed with a twin parallel hipped slate roof was constructed. This shed had capacity for 40 locomotives and was located to the south of the original two sheds at 53°31′44″N 2°36′55″W, it opened in 1869. Its facilities included a coal stage and a 64,000 imperial gallons (290,000 L; 77,000 US gal) water tank located to the front left of the main building. The original shed remained open for a short while after the new shed opened. When the new shed opened the turntable remained in the 'V' of junction.

=== 1882 to 1935 ===
By 1881 the shed was accommodating 86 locomotives and the Chief Mechanical Engineer, by this time Francis Webb, gained authority for a second building. In 1882 the shed was extended by the addition of a brick built 8 track straight dead-ended shed with a northlight pattern roof along the eastern wall. The new shed became known as "No 2" with the former shed referred to as "No 1". A 42 feet (13 m) turntable was installed behind the coaling stage in front of the shed.

Around this time the L&NWR started to use codes for its sheds and Springs Branch was allocated 25.

In 1930s both buildings had their roof vents replaced.

=== 1935 to 1966 ===
In 1935 considerable changes were made to the trackwork in front of the sheds as the site was expanded on its eastern side, the old coaling stage, water tank and turntable were removed and replaced by a mechanical coaling plant, two coal storage sidings, a new ash plant and a larger 100,000 imperial gallons (450,000 L; 120,000 US gal) water tank. A new 60 feet (18 m) Gresham & Craven electrically operated turntable was installed alongside No 2 shed.

In 1935 the shed was given the code 10A by the London, Midland and Scottish Railway (LMS).

In 1951 the "No 1" shed was rebuilt as a 6 track shed of the same dimensions, the new design allowing for extra space between the roads. It had a louvre style roof vents and a brick screen installed between the main shed and the workshops at the rear which had been kept from the old shed. The shed was fitted an electric wheel drop, overhead gantry cranes and illuminated inspection pits.

In 1955 the "No 2" shed was re-roofed with a steel frame covered in corrugated iron sheeting.

From March 1958 British Railways allocated the code 8F.

In the winter of 1960/61 "No 2" shed was mostly demolished to make way for a 4 road diesel depot built with a steel frame, corrugated roof and sides, which opened in 1967. (Note: The workshop and stores section across the back of the shed were retained.) The remaining four outside roads were used for stabling and provided with stanchion lighting.

=== 1966 to 2005 ===
The four road diesel shed did not last long, it was demolished in 1966, together with the turntable. A new three road diesel maintenance depot was constructed on the site, opening in April 1968, additional buildings for offices and stores were built to the rear of the new shed, with the older offices at the rear of "No 1" shed being used for train crew. Meanwhile, steam locomotives stopped being allocated to the shed on 4 December 1967.

"No 1" shed continued in use for stabling and later as a store until its demolition in October 1983, after the demolition the tracks were used for locomotive and wagon storage.

With the introduction of TOPS depot codes in May 1973 the depot became SP.

The shed officially closed on 4 May 1997 but as part of the privatisation of British Rail it was quickly taken over by English, Welsh & Scottish Railway (EWS) as a component recovery depot, it continued in this role until 2005.

=== 2005 to 2018 ===
The depot was under lease to DB Schenker Rail UK (as EWS had become) and was used for breakdown crane stabling and seasonal fleet (MPVs) maintenance and stabling.

== Allocations ==
Locomotives were frequently moved around the railways so any list of allocations is necessarily a snapshot.

=== London and North Western Railway ===
L&NWR locomotive policy was to replace locomotives going for overhaul with a similar locomotive that had just been overhauled making individual locomotive allocations difficult to track.

In November 1911 the shed had an allocation of 95 locomotives by 1913 this had increased to 102 locomotives but by October 1917 the allocation had reduced to 76.

L&NWR locomotive allocations by year: 1911 & 1917

Class	1911	1917	Notes
LNWR Precedent Class	1	3	
LNWR Improved Precedent Class	1	1	
LNWR Waterloo Class	1	1	
LNWR 5ft 6in Tank Class	3	3	
LNWR 19in Express Goods Class	4	2	
LNWR 1400 Class	1	1	
LNWR 18in Goods Class 0-6-0 'Cauliflower'	11	21	
LNWR DX Goods Class	21	10	
LNWR Class G	11	2	
LNWR Class D	1	7	
LNWR Class F	1	1	
LNWR Class C	3	-	
LNWR Class B	2	5	
LNWR 17in Coal Engine	20	10	
LNWR Webb Coal Tank	4	1	
Square saddle tank engines	7	-	LNWR 17in Coal Engines rebuilt as pannier tank locomotives
LNWR Special Tank	3	4	
LNWR Whale Experiment Class	-	1	
LNWR Prince of Wales Tank Class	-	1	
LNWR 1185 Class 0-8-2T	-	2	
Total	95	76	

=== London, Midland and Scottish Railway ===
Coates (2010) provides a comprehensive list of which types of locomotives were allocated to the shed for most years of LMS ownership, the summaries for 1928, 1938 and 1948 are shown here.

LMS locomotive allocations by year: 1928, 1938 & 1948

Class	1928	1938	1948
LNWR DX Goods class	2	-	-
LNWR Whale Experiment Class	4	-	-
LNWR Whale Precursor Class	4	-	-
LNWR George the Fifth Class	1	-	-
LNWR Prince of Wales Class	14	-	-
LNWR 19in Express Goods Class	9	1	2
LNWR 18in Goods Class 0-6-0 'Cauliflower'	19	3	4
LNWR 17in Coal Engine	26	1	-
LNWR Class D & LNWR Class G	26	29	29
LNWR Class B, LNWR Class E & LNWR Class F	4	-	-
LNWR Special Tank	7	2	-
LNWR Webb Coal Tank	-	-	1
LNWR 5ft 6in Tank Class	3	-	-
L&YR Class 5	-	5	-
LNWR 1185 Class 0-8-2T	4	4	3
L&YR Class 27 3F 0-6-0	-	8	3
L&YR Class 25 2F 0-6-0	-	10	9
LMS 2-Cylindered Stanier 2-6-4T or LMS 3-Cylindered Stanier 2-6-4T	-	2	9
LMS Stanier 2-6-2T	-	1	-
Midland Railway Class 2 4-4-0	-	1	2
LMS Stanier Class 5 4-6-0 'Black 5'	-	8	7
LMS Fowler Class 3F 0-6-0T 'Jinty'	2	2	-
LMS Stanier Mogul	-	2	-
LMS Fowler Class 4F	6	1	-
Total	131	80	69

=== British Railways ===
The British Rail period saw some major changes that affected the shed allocations, in March 1952 the shed at Lower Ince closed and the ex-Great Central locomotives allocated there moved to Springs shed. In April 1964 the former L&YR shed at Wigan closed and its locomotives were then allocated to Springs. The shed finally closed to steam locomotives on 4 December 1967, prior to this a lot of locomotives were withdrawn and stored, being replaced by diesel traction.

Coates (2010) provides a comprehensive list of which types of locomotives were allocated to the shed for most years during the British Railways steam era, the summaries for 1950, 1959 and 1965 are shown here as Bolger (1981), and the online BR Database also provides lists of steam locomotives types for these years, the differences in the totals can be accounted for by the day-to-day fluctuations of allocations.

BR locomotive allocations by year: 1950, 1959 & 1965

Author	Coates	Bolger	BRDb	Coates	Bolger	BRDb	Coates	Bolger	BRDb
Class	1950	1950	1950	1959	1959	1959	1965	1965	1965
LMS/BR Class 4 2-6-4T locomotives	10	10	9	7	10	9	9	6	9
LMS Stanier Class 5 4-6-0 'Black 5'	7	7	7	14	10	9	15	20	16
LNWR 1185 Class 0-8-2T	3	4	2	-	-	-	-	-	-
LNWR Class G1 & G2 0-8-0 'Super Ds'	27	26	20	28	32	25	-	-	-
L&YR Class 25 2F 0-6-0	4	4	7	-	-	-	-	-	-
L&YR Class 27 3F 0-6-0	6	5	2	-	-	-	-	-	-
LNWR 18in Goods Class 0-6-0 'Cauliflower'	2	1	-	-	-	-	-	-	-
LMS Fowler Class 4F 0-6-0	-	-	-	4	4	4	2	2	2
LMS Ivatt Class 2 2-6-0	-	-	-	4	4	4	-	7	7
GCR Class 9D (LNER Class J10) 0-6-0	-	-	-	4	5	5	-	-	-
WD Austerity 2-8-0	-	-	-	4	2	-	5	1	11
ex LMS Diesel shunters (BR class 11)	-	-	-	6	-	3	9	-	6
British Rail Class 08 Diesel shunters	-	-	-	-	-	3	-	-	2
ex LMS Diesel shunters (not BR class 11)	-	-	-	-	-	-	-	-	4
LMS Stanier Mogul 2-6-0	-	-	-	-	-	-	4	9	9
LMS Fowler Class 3F 0-6-0T 'Jinty'	-	-	-	-	-	-	5	5	5
LMS Stanier Class 8F 2-8-0 'Black 8'	-	-	-	-	-	-	12	8	6
LMS Fairburn 2-6-4T	-	-	-	-	-	3	-	-	3
LMS Royal Scot Class 4-6-0	-	-	-	-	-	-	-	-	1
BR Standard Class 4 2-6-0	-	-	-	-	-	-	-	-	12
Total	59	57	47	71	67	65	61	58	93

During the diesel era the shed had the following allocations;

BR locomotive allocations by year: 1975 & 1985

Class	1975	1985	1995
British Rail Class 08 Diesel shunters	22	10	2
British Rail Class 25/1	4	4	-
British Rail Class 25/2	11	1	-
British Rail Class 25/3	8	6	-
British Rail Class 40	15	1	-
Total	60	22	2
