= 1400 class =

1400 class or Class 1400 may refer to:

- CP Class 1400, diesel-electric locomotives
- GWR 1400 Class, 0-4-2 steam locomotives
- LNWR 1400 Class, 4-6-0 steam locomotives
- Queensland Railways 1400 class, diesel-electric locomotives
