= LNWR Webb Precursor Class =

LNWR Precursor class (Webb)
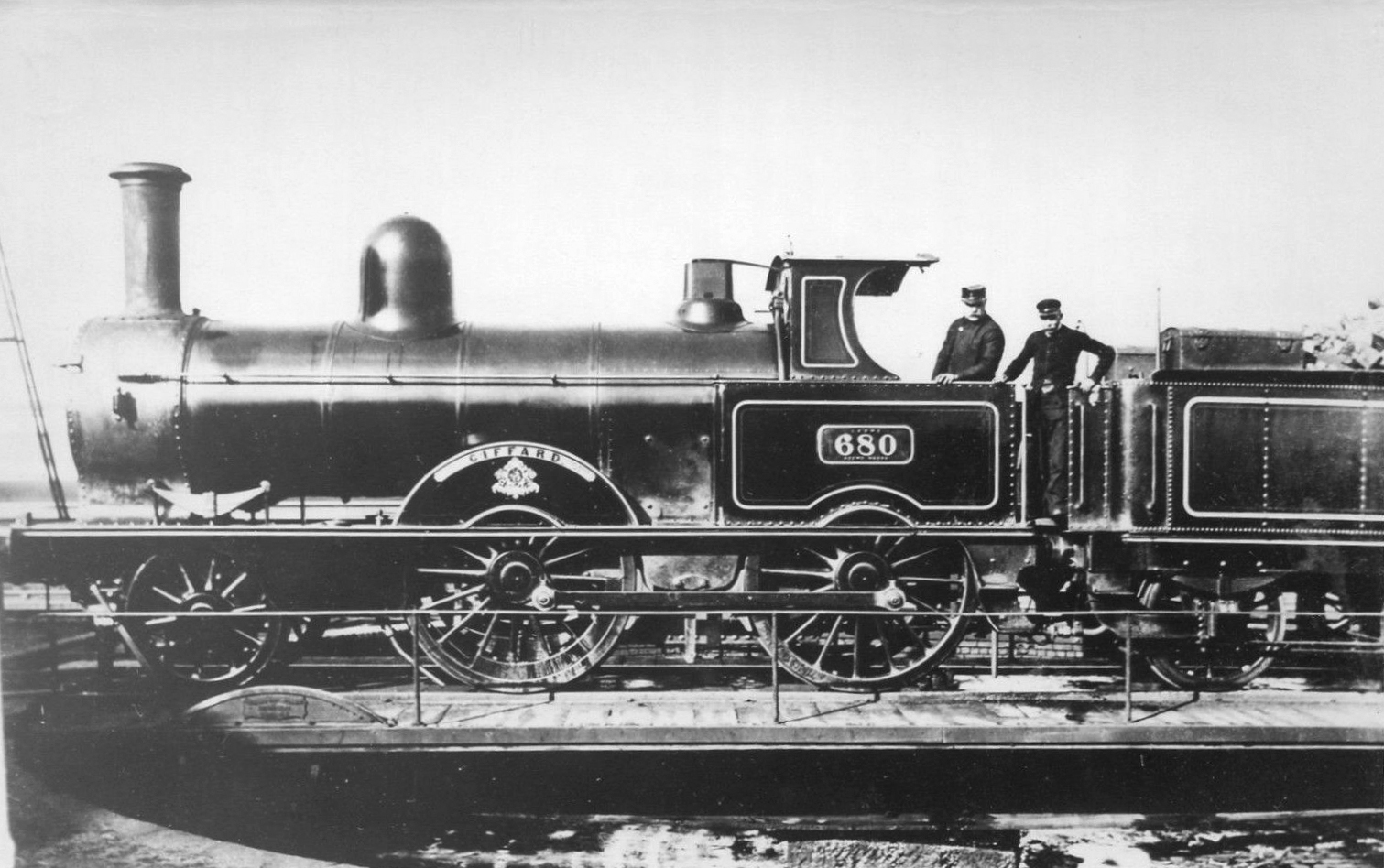
- LNWR engine No. 680 'Giffard'
Type and origin
- Power type: Steam
- Designer: F. W. Webb
- Builder: Crewe Works
- Serial number: 1902–1821, 2229–2238, 2249–2258
- Build date: 1874–1879
- Total produced: 40
Specifications
- Configuration
  - Whyte: 2-4-0
  - UIC: 1B n2
- Gauge: 4 ft 8 1/2 in (1,435 mm)
- Leading dia.: 3 ft 6 in (1.067 m)
- Driver dia.: 5 ft 6 in (1.676 m)
- Wheelbase: 7 ft 5 in (2.261 m) +; 8 ft 3 in (2.515 m)
- Loco weight: 32 long tons (33 t)
- Boiler
  - Diameter: 4 ft 2 in (1.27 m)
  - Tube plates: 9 ft 10 in (3.00 m)
- Boiler pressure: 140 lbf/in^{2} (0.97 MPa)
- Heating surface: 1,074.6 sq ft (99.83 m^{2})
- Cylinder size: 17 in × 24 in (432 mm × 610 mm)
- Valve gear: Allan
Career
- Operators: London and North Western Railway
- Scrapped: 1892–1895
- Disposition: All scrapped

The London and North Western Railway (LNWR) Precursor class was a class of forty 2-4-0 steam locomotives designed by F. W. Webb and built at the railway's Crewe Works between 1874 and 1879.

== History ==
The Precursor class was the first locomotive class to be designed wholly by F. W. Webb. He had previously ordered further examples of his predecessor's Samson and Newton classes.

The class featured enclosed wheel splashers and cabs from new, but no brakes were initially fitted; some received steam brakes and others vacuum brakes. They were also fitted with 1,500-imperial-gallon (6,800 L; 1,800 US gal) tenders.

Webb's Precursors performed well enough, but it didn't take long before these engines (as well as the Ramsbottom Samson and Newton classes) were superseded by his Improved Precedent Class and, being viewed as weaker than these newer engines, it wouldn't take long before they were on the line of withdrawal, with the first going out in 1892 and the last one holding on until 1895.

== Fleet list ==
Table of locomotives
LNWR No.	Name	Crewe Works No.	Date built	Date scrapped	Notes
2145	Precursor	1802	Apr 1874	Mar 1894	
2146	Harbinger	1803	Aug 1874	Jun 1893	
2147	Champion	1804	Aug 1874	Nov 1895	
2148	Vizier	1805	Aug 1874	1893 circa	
2149	Candidate	1806	Aug 1874	Jun 1893	
1143	Marquis	1807	Aug 1874	1894 circa	
1144	Druid	1808	Aug 1874	1892 circa	
1145	Cossack	1809	Sep 1874	1894 circa	
1152	Arab	1810	Sep 1874	Dec 1892	
1153	Sirocco	1811	Sep 1874	Aug 1895	
1154	Colossus	1812	Sep 1874	1892 circa	
1155	Dragon	1813	Sep 1874	Apr 1894	
402	Viscount	1814	Sep 1874	Jun 1893	
406	Senator	1815	Sep 1874	1892 circa	
408	Simoon	1816	Sep 1874	1894 circa	
409	Thunderbolt	1817	Oct 1874	Dec 1892	
413	Python	1818	Oct 1874	Jun 1893	
425	Oberon	1819	Oct 1874	1893	
426	Warrior	1820	Oct 1874	1895 circa	
427	Fame	1821	Oct 1874	1894 circa	
1147	John Rennie	2229	Oct 1878	1894 circa	
1148	Boadicea	2230	Oct 1878	1894 circa	
1149	Helvellyn	2231	Sep 1878	1894 circa	
1150	Lang Meg	2232	Oct 1878	1893 circa	
1151	Lapwing	2233	Oct 1878	May 1895	
1165	Vulture	2234	Nov 1878	Dec 1892	
1169	Albatross	2235	Oct 1878	Dec 1892	
1174	Cerberus	2236	Oct 1878	Jun 1893	
679	Harrowby	2237	Oct 1878	1894 circa	
847	Cedric	2238	Oct 1878	1895 circa	
431	Bessemer	2249	Jan 1879	Dec 1892	
838	Henry Cort	2250	Jan 1879	Sep 1895	
481	Etna	2251	Jan 1879	Dec 1892	
626	Emerald	2252	Jan 1879	1895 circa	
255	Eglington	2253	Jan 1879	1895 circa	
680	Giffard	2254	Jan 1879	1895 circa	
338	Levens	2255	Feb 1879	Dec 1892	
718	Jason	2256	Feb 1879	Jun 1893	
779	William Baker	2257	Feb 1879	Jun 1893	
1180	Pearl	2258	Feb 1879	Feb 1895	
