= Ditton Junction rail crash =

1912 railway incident in England

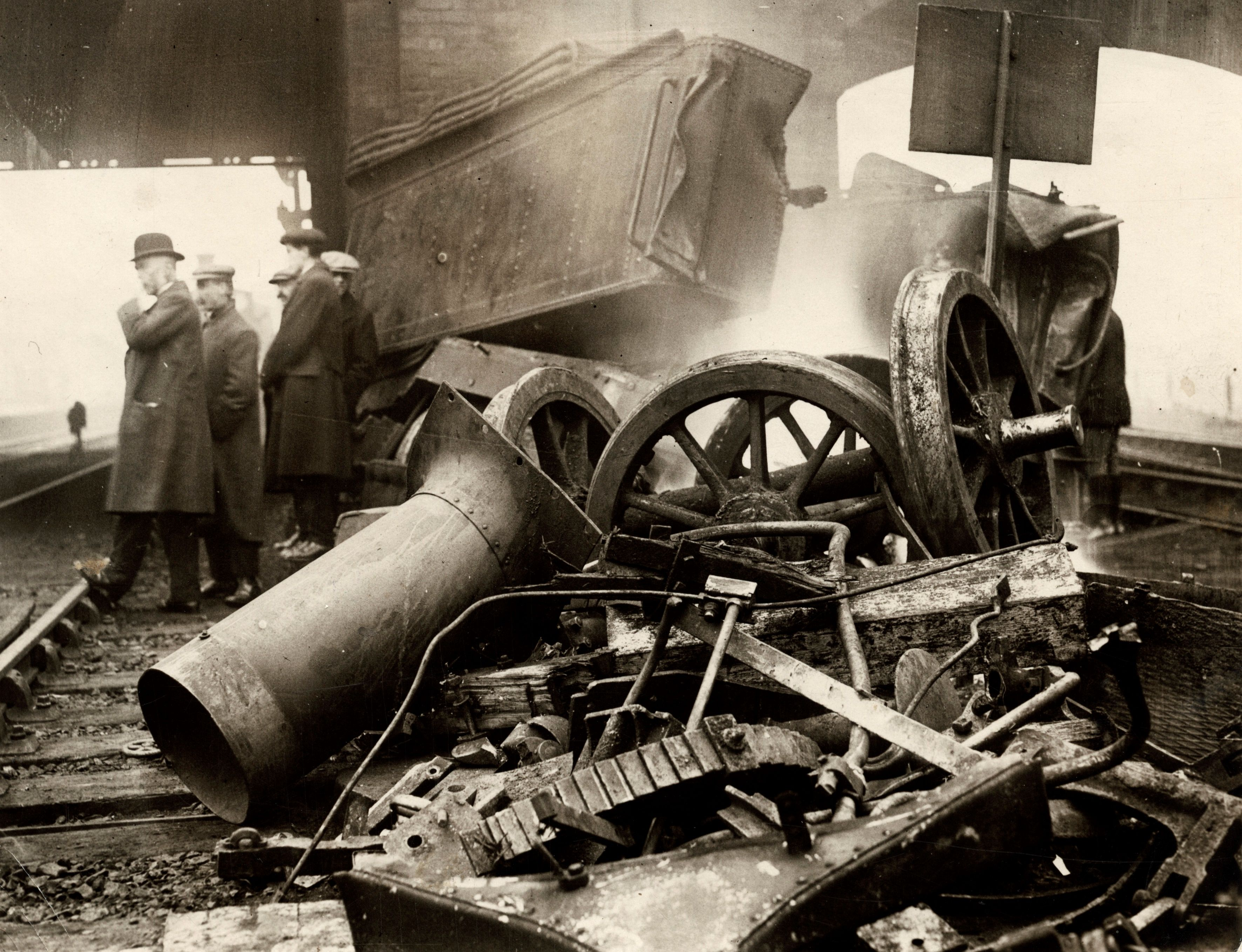

Details
- Date: 17 September 1912
- Location: Ditton Junction
- Coordinates: 53.35634°N 2.76918°W
- Country: England
- Line: London and North Western Railway
- Cause: Driver misread signals

Statistics
- Trains: 1
- Deaths: 15

Ditton Junction is near Widnes on the Liverpool spur of the former London and North Western Railway. This complex junction had eight running lines and associated signal gantries. On 17 September 1912 the 17:30 Chester to Liverpool express was signalled to cross from the fast to the slow line, but the driver, Robert Hughes, age 41, from Llangwstenin, Conwy, who had little experience of the junction and had never been switched here before, misread the signals and thought he had a clear run through. The crossover had a speed limit of 15 mph (24 km/h) but the train hit it at 60 mph (97 km/h) The locomotive, a 2-4-0 of the Precedent class turned on its side and travelled some distance, striking the pier of an overbridge (partially demolishing it) and breaking in two. The six carriages following ploughed over the engine and were all destroyed - forming a heap of wreckage between the station platforms. Punctured gaslighting cylinders ignited, turning the scene into an inferno. The driver, fireman and 13 passengers were killed.

Blame was attributed by Horatio Arthur Yorke to the driver for not applying for a pilot at Chester. The confusing signalling at the junction was also criticised.

== Sources ==
- Rolt, L.T.C.; Kichenside, Geoffrey (1982) [1955]. Red for Danger (4th ed.). Newton Abbot: David & Charles. pp. 173–174. ISBN 0-7153-8362-0.
- The Railways Archive :: Report by Lieutenant-Colonel Yorke, R.E., C.B., on the Accident that occurred on 17 September 1912, to a Passenger Train at Ditton Junction, on the London and North Western Railway
