= Francis Webb (engineer) =

English railway engineer

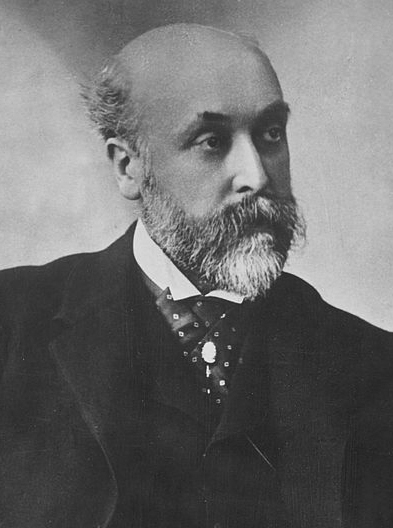
- Webb in 1890
- Born: 21 May 1836; Tixall, Staffordshire, England
- Died: 4 June 1906 (aged 70); Bournemouth, England
- Engineering career
- Discipline: Mechanical engineering

Francis William Webb (21 May 1836 – 4 June 1906) was an English railway engineer responsible for the design and manufacture of locomotives for the London and North Western Railway (LNWR). As the LNWR's chief mechanical engineer, he also exercised great influence in political and public life in the Cheshire town of Crewe, once being described as the 'King of Crewe'.

== Early life ==
Webb was born on 21 May 1836 in Tixall Rectory, near Stafford, the second son of William Webb (1806–1883), Rector of Tixall.

== Career ==
=== Crewe Works ===
Showing early interest in mechanical engineering, Webb was articled as a pupil of Francis Trevithick at Crewe Works on 11 August 1851 at the age of fifteen. He joined the drawing office at the end of his training in 1856. He became the chief draughtsman on 1 March 1859. On 1 September 1861, he was appointed Works Manager at Crewe and Chief Assistant to engineer John Ramsbottom. While Works Manager, Webb was responsible for the installation of Bessemer converters and the start of steel production at Crewe.

=== Bolton Iron and Steel Company ===
In July 1866, Webb resigned from the LNWR and moved to the Bolton Iron and Steel Co. as manager. It has been suggested that this move was arranged by the LNWR management to enable him to gain experience in steel making.

=== Return to Crewe ===
Ramsbottom gave 12 months' notice of his resignation from Crewe in September 1870. Shortly afterwards, their Works Manager Thomas Stubbs, who may have been Ramsbottom's intended successor, died age 34. The Chairman of the LNWR, Richard Moon, contacted Webb and invited him to return to Crewe. In October 1870, Moon informed Webb that his appointment as Locomotive Superintendent had been approved. Webb's salary was set at £2,000 for the first year, and £3,000 for the second and subsequent years. Webb returned on 1 October 1871. He became Chief Mechanical Engineer when the post of Locomotive Superintendent was renamed. It appears that this happened soon after Webb took up his duties. At the same time, he also became President of the Crewe Mechanics' Institute, where he had for some time taught engineering drawing during his first stay at Crewe. Webb remained Chief Mechanical Engineer of the LNWR until 1 July 1903, having tendered his resignation in November 1902 but grown ill and been forced to leave earlier than expected. Successor George Whale was appointed in April 1903 but took over somewhat earlier than planned.

=== Locomotive classes ===
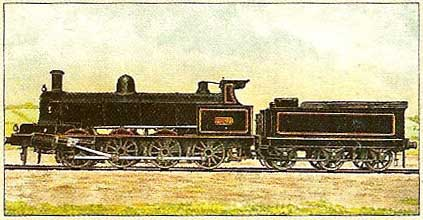
No. 1881 Class B locomotive of the London & North Western Railway, a Webb 0-8-0 four cylinder compound.

Webb was responsible throughout his career for some highly successful standard locomotive classes, all built at Crewe in considerable numbers. Notable among these were the Precedent class of 2-4-0 (known as Jumbos), an 0-6-0 general purpose freight design, ("Coal Engine") and its 0-6-2 ("Coal Tank") variant, a celebrated 0-6-0 mixed traffic design ("Cauliflowers"), and an 0-8-0 freight locomotive with two compound variants and a simple expansion version produced in parallel, The last-mentioned was continuously developed and built until London, Midland, and Scottish Railway days, most earlier locomotives being rebuilt to conform.

==== Controversy ====
There remains some controversy over Webb's two distinct compound systems applied to a number of locomotive designs, which are reputed to have given considerable trouble in service. The Webb Experiment and Improved Precedent classed were withdrawn by his successor George Whale soon after he succeeded Webb in 1903.

An obituary in The Engineer from 8 June 1906 criticised Webb's express compound design, which used un-coupled high and low pressure cylinders, a design promoted by Webb alone. The article caused open debate in the pages of the journal, mostly based on the perceived flaw of not utilising coupling rods. In the 20 June edition, the editor of the journal continued the attack on the deceased engineer, stating:

It is a noteworthy fact that no railway authority in Great Britain and Ireland ever believed in these engines; Mr. Webb, and Mr. Webb only, had faith in them. Precisely on what evidence that faith was based we have never been able to discover.

— The Engineer, June 20, 1906

=== Other work ===
Webb was responsible for the remodelling of Crewe station, which involved the building of four tracks in underpasses on the west side of the station to carry freight trains.

Webb also made numerous inventions and received over 80 patents. He was vice-president of the Institution of Civil Engineers and the Institution of Mechanical Engineers.

== Local political and public life ==
Webb took a great interest in local politics, was on the Crewe town council, and was mayor twice, in 1887 and 1888. He was also an alderman on Cheshire County Council—useful for the LNWR, as the council controlled matters relating to the railway, including the rates the company paid. Webb also served as a magistrate.

In the late 19th century, as the chief mechanical engineer at LNWR's Crewe works, Webb was "the most influential individual in the town". It was stated that "it was during the 'reign' of F. W. Webb, between 1872 and 1903, that the power of this office was its height. Described just before his retirement as 'the King of Crewe', Webb came to exercise control over the working lives of over 18,000 men - one third of the total LNWR workforce. Over half these lived in Crewe, around 8,000 being employed at the locomotive works. Several recreational and sporting organisations were a direct result of Webb's influence and others received benefit from his support." These included the LNWR Cricket Club (established in 1850) and the Crewe Alexandra Athletic Club (established in 1867).

Webb's influence in Crewe allegedly extended to intimidation of Liberal Party sympathisers during the 1880s. In September 1885, the editor of the Crewe Chronicle published charges against Webb, saying "that through the action, direct and indirect, of Tory railway officialism, the political life of Crewe is cramped and hindered beyond recognition". In November 1889, Crewe Town Council debated a motion which accused the works managers of working with Tories "to crush Liberalism altogether out of the town", with a member arguing that "by intimidation and persecution of your Liberal workmen, and by making the chances of promotion depend upon subserviency to the Tory political demands of the Management, they have created a state of political serfdom in the works." In December 1889, Liberal statesman William Ewart Gladstone wrote a letter to the Chronicle condemning the company's behaviour.

=== Philanthropy ===
In Crewe, Webb was for many years remembered as a major benefactor of the "Webb Orphanage", a red-brick building with extensive playing fields behind the railway works. "Frank Webb Avenue", a much later Crewe residential street, also recalls his name.

In 1887, together with Richard Moon, chairman of the LNWR, Webb presented to the Crewe Corporation Queen's Park, a large landscaped park with striking entrance gates and lodges (complete with inscribed decoration mentioning both Moon and Webb), on behalf of the railway company. He also helped Crewe Alexandra athletic and cricket clubs relocate from the Alexandra Recreation Ground to a new ground in 1898.

== Retirement and death ==
Webb retired in 1903 to Bournemouth, where he died in 1906, aged 70. He had never married.

A complex man, with very great capabilities, deep sensitivity and tolerance yet sometimes an unapproachable martinet, blind to the faults of his later compound locomotives.

— L&NWR Society : Personalities.

== Locomotive designs ==
- LNWR 1201 0-4-0ST
- LNWR 17in Coal Engine 0-6-0
- LNWR Webb Precursor Class 2-4-0
- LNWR Precedent Class 2-4-0
- LNWR Chopper Tank Class 2-4-2T
- LNWR 4ft 6in Tank Class 2-4-2T
- LNWR 18in Goods Class 0-6-0
- LNWR Webb Coal Tank 0-6-2
- LNWR Special DX Class 2-4-0
- LNWR Webb Experiment Class 2-2-2-0
- LNWR Dreadnought Class 2-2-2-0
- LNWR Improved Precedent Class 2-4-0
- LNWR Teutonic Class 2-2-2-0
- LNWR Waterloo Class 2-4-0
- LNWR 5ft 6in Tank Class 2-4-2T
- LNWR Greater Britain Class 2-2-2-2
- LNWR Class A 0-8-0
- LNWR John Hick Class 2-2-2-2
- LNWR Dock Tank 0-4-2ST
- LNWR 18in Tank Class 0-6-2T
- LNWR Jubilee Class 4-4-0
- LNWR Alfred the Great Class 4-4-0
- LNWR Class B 0-8-0
- LNWR 1400 Class 4-6-0

Preceded by John Ramsbottom	Chief Mechanical Engineer; London and North Western Railway –1903	Succeeded by George Whale
