= LNWR 4ft 6in Tank Class =

Class of British steam locomotives

LNWR 4′ 6″ Tank
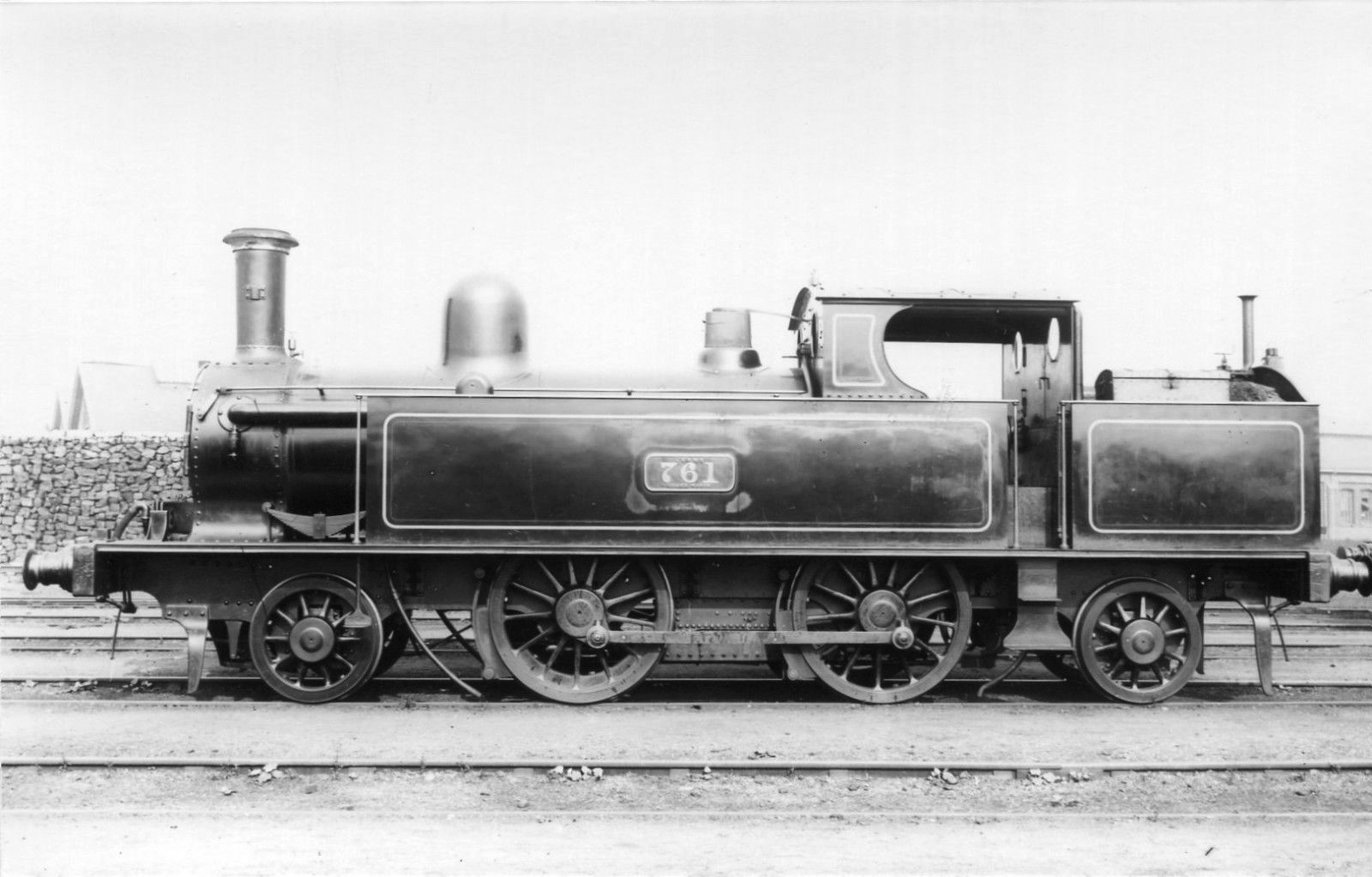
- No.761
Type and origin
- Power type: Steam
- Designer: F. W. Webb
- Builder: Crewe Works
- Build date: 1879–1898
- Total produced: 220
Specifications
- Configuration
  - Whyte: 2-4-2T
  - UIC: 1′B1′n2t
- Gauge: 4 ft 8 1/2 in (1,435 mm)
- Leading dia.: 3 ft 3 in (991 mm)
- Driver dia.: 4 ft 8 1/2 in (1,435 mm)
- Trailing dia.: 3 ft 3 in (991 mm)
- Wheelbase: Coupled: 7 ft 9 in (2.36 m); Loco: 21 ft 3 in (6.48 m)
- Loco weight: 46 long tons (47 t)
- Fuel type: Coal
- Boiler: Diameter: 4 ft 0 in (1.22 m); Length: 9 ft 10 in (3.00 m)
- Boiler pressure: 150 lbf/in^{2} (1.03 MPa)
- Heating surface: 971.6 sq ft (90.26 m^{2})
- Cylinders: Two, inside
- Cylinder size: 17 in × 20 in (432 mm × 508 mm)
- Valve gear: Allan valve gear
Performance figures
- Tractive effort: 12,577 lbf (55.95 kN)
Career
- Operators: London and North Western Railway; London, Midland and Scottish Railway; Dublin, Wicklow and Wexford Railway; Dublin and South Eastern Railway; Great Southern Railways; Wirral Railway; Cardiff Railway; Great Western Railway
- Withdrawn: 1905–1936
- Disposition: All scrapped

The LNWR 4ft 6in Tank was a class of 220 passenger 2-4-2T locomotives manufactured by the London and North Western Railway in their Crewe Works between 1879 and 1898. The "4ft 6in" in the title referred to the diameter of the driving wheels – although the stated dimension was for the wheel centres – the nominal diameter including the tyres was 4 ft 8 1/2 in (1,435 mm).

The design was an extension of the earlier 2234 2-4-0T built from 1876 which became known as "Chopper Tanks".

== Design ==
The design featured a boiler pressed to 150 lbf/in^{2} (1.03 MPa) delivering saturated steam to two 17-by-20-inch (432 mm × 508 mm) cylinders connected by Allan valve gear to the driving wheels.

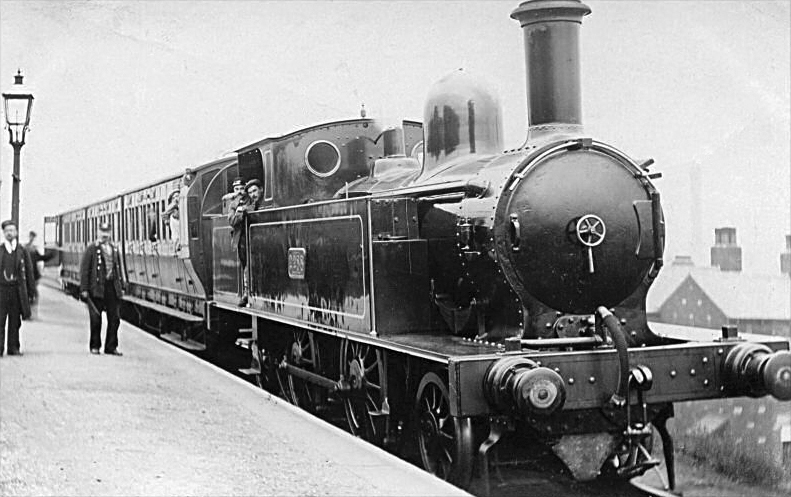
No. 2288 in service

They were an extended version of the 2234 class 2-4-0T locomotives, sharing the same boiler and wheelbase. In 1905 five of the 2-4-2Ts were rebuilt as 2-4-0Ts, which may have led to the latter becoming known as "Chopper Tanks".

The twenty locomotives delivered in 1889–1890 were fitted with condensing apparatus from new.

== Service ==
They had been designed for working local passenger trains. From 1909 many locomotives of the class were fitted for Push-pull working, giving the nickname of "Motor Tanks".

== Sales ==
=== Dublin, Wicklow and Wexford Railway ===
Six locomotives were sold to the Dublin, Wicklow and Wexford Railway in 1902 for £1500 each, and re-gauged to 5 ft 3 in (1,600 mm). They were numbered 59 to 64 and all were named after Irish Earls. All six were still in service when the DW&WR became the Dublin and South Eastern Railway in 1907. They were generally used for suburban work and noted for used on the Harcourt to Bray line. Five were sold to the British Government in 1916, regauged back to 4 ft 8 1/2 in (1,435 mm) gauge; two went to the Inland Waterways and Docks where they lasted until scrapped in 1919. One went to the War Department site at Shoeburyness; it was scrapped in the early 1920s. The other two went to the colliery at Cramlington until they scrapped in 1923 and 1929.

The locomotive remaining in Ireland, No. 64, works number 2002 of 1877, was at one point named Earl of Bessborough. It had been re-built at Crewe in 1914 receiving the works number 3605. During the Irish Civil War it carried additional steel plating, carried the name Faugh a Ballagh (Clear the way) and was used to draw an armoured train. It passed to the Great Southern Railways in 1925, and was withdrawn in 1936.

=== Wirral Railway ===
Four were sold to the Wirral Railway between 1913 and 1921; all passed to the London, Midland and Scottish Railway in 1923, and were renumbered 6758–6761, after the block of LNWR 5ft 6in Tanks.

=== Cardiff Railway ===
One was sold to the Cardiff Railway in 1914; it passed to the Great Western Railway in 1922, but was withdrawn in May of that year.

=== Cromford and High Peak Railway ===
One of the 2-4-0 examples was allocated to pasture shed and worked there up until 1952, being withdrawn in June of that year. It was the last to be scrapped.

== Decline ==
Withdrawals started in 1905: 118 were scrapped in the years up to 1923 grouping, leaving 90 to be passed to the London, Midland and Scottish Railway. They were allocated power class 1P, and assigned the numbers 6515–6600 and 6758–6761; although only 37 survived long enough to receive them: withdrawals restarted in 1924, and when the last was withdrawn in June 1936, the class became extinct. None were preserved.

== References and citations ==
=== References ===
- Baxter, Bertram (1979). Baxter, David (ed.). British Locomotive Catalogue 1825–1923. Vol. 2B: London and North Western Railway and its constituent companies. Ashbourne, Derbyshire: Moorland Publishing Company. pp. 205–210. ISBN 0-903485-84-2.
- Casserley, H. C. & Johnston, Stuart W. (1974) [1966]. Locomotives at the Grouping 3: London, Midland and Scottish Railway. Shepperton, Surrey: Ian Allan. pp. 73–74. ISBN 0-7110-0554-0.
