= LNWR 18in Tank Class =

LNWR 18-inch Tank
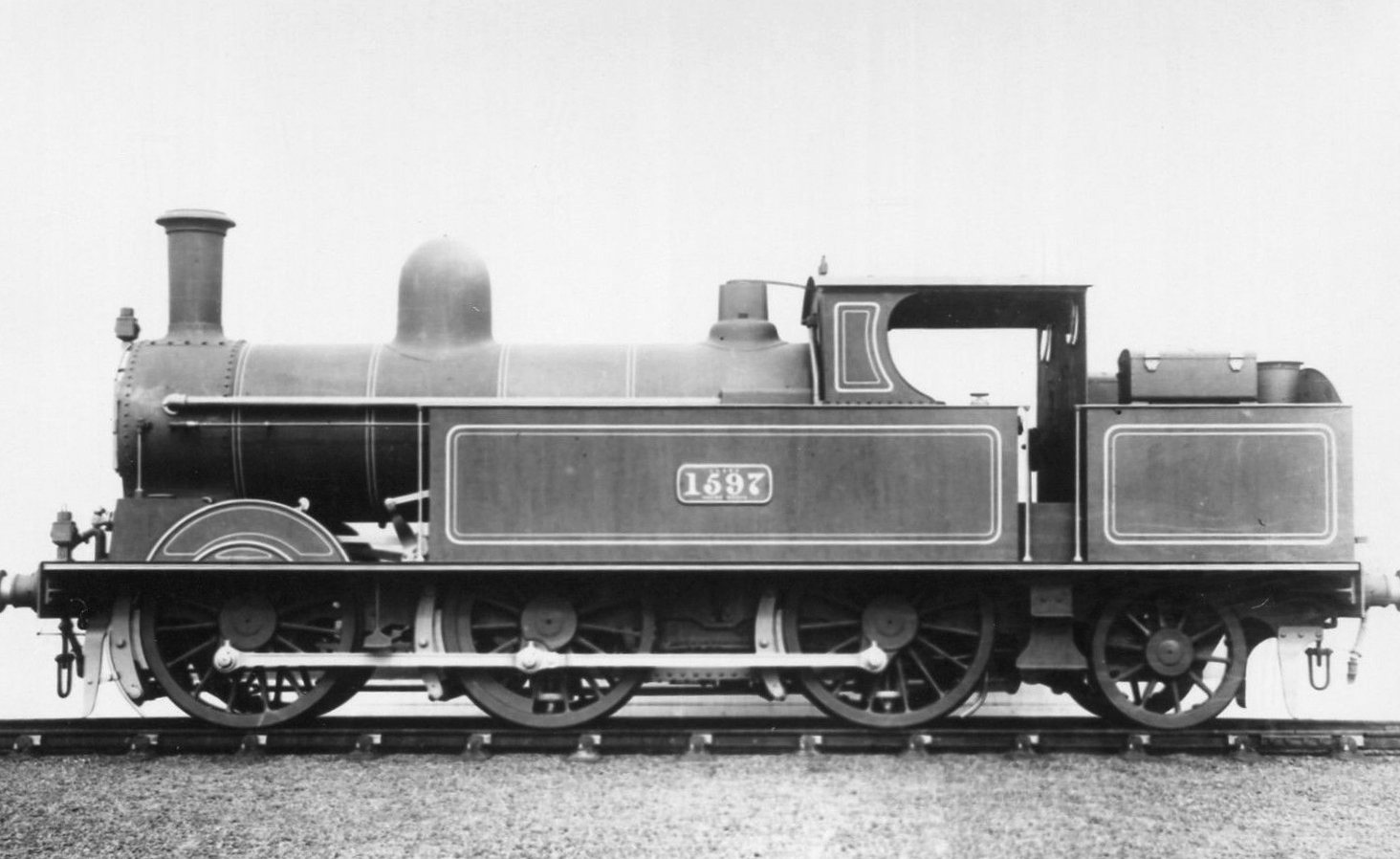
- 1597, probably as built in photographic grey livery.
Type and origin
- Power type: Steam
- Designer: F. W. Webb
- Serial number: 3716–3725, 3878–3887, 3946–3955, 3966–3975, 4055–4064, 4135–4144, 4205–4214, 4225–4234
- Build date: May 1898 – July 1902
- Total produced: 80
Specifications
- Configuration
  - Whyte: 0-6-2T
  - UIC: C1 n2t
- Gauge: 4 ft 8 1/2 in (1,435 mm)
- Driver dia.: 5 ft 2 1/2 in (1,588 mm)
- Trailing dia.: 3 ft 9 in (1,143 mm)
- Wheelbase: 22 ft 3 in (6.78 m)
  - Axle spacing (Asymmetrical): 7 ft 3 in (2.21 m) + 8 ft 3 in (2.51 m) + 6 ft 9 in (2.06 m)
- Loco weight: 52 long tons (53 t)
- Cylinders: Two, inside
- Cylinder size: 18 in × 24 in (457 mm × 610 mm)
- Valve gear: Joy
Career
- Operators: London and North Western Railway; London, Midland and Scottish Railway; British Railways
- Power class: LMS: 1P
- Withdrawn: 1920–1953
- Disposition: All scrapped

The LNWR 18-inch Tank class was a class of 80 0-6-2T locomotives built by the London and North Western Railway in their Crewe Works between 1898 and 1902.

They were also known officially as the 5ft 3in Tank Class or unofficially as the Watford Tank Class.

== Design ==
The design featured a boiler pressed to 150 lbf/in^{2} (1.03 MPa) delivering saturated steam to two 18 by 24 in (457 by 610 mm) cylinders connected by Joy valve gear to the driving wheels.

The "5ft 3in" in the title referred to the diameter of the driving wheels (usually the stated dimension was for the wheel centres) but which were actually 5 ft 0 in (1.524 m). The nominal diameter including the tyres was 5 ft 2 1/2 in (1.588 m).

They were a tank engine version of the LNWR Cauliflower Class, built from 1892.

== Service ==
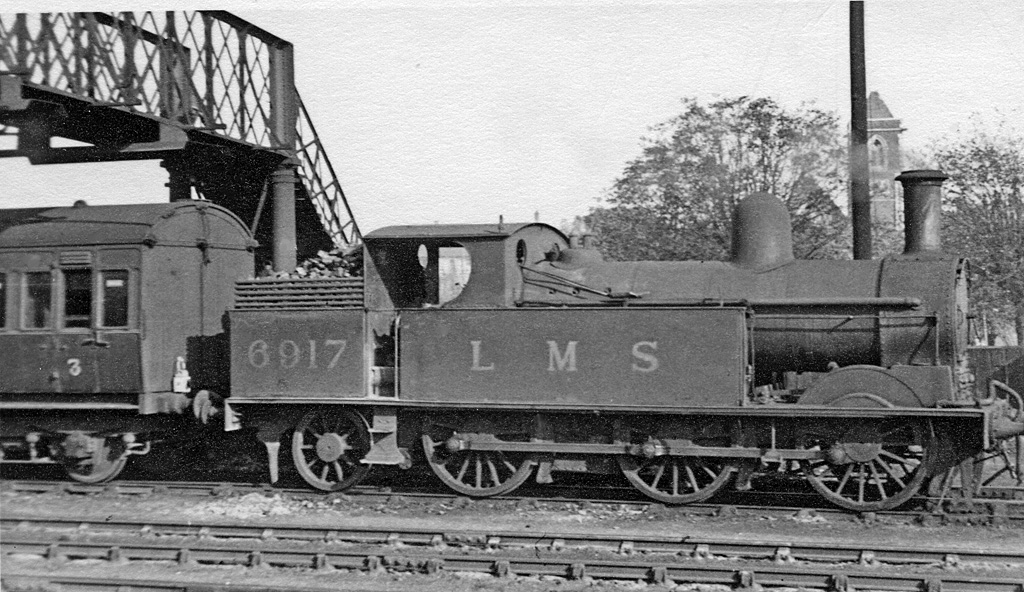
6917 at Leighton Buzzard station in 1948.

They were built as mixed traffic locomotives, and were frequently used on suburban services. Their use on Euston to Watford suburban trains gave rise to the nickname "Watford Tanks".

The first locomotive was withdrawn in 1920. By the time of the 1923 Grouping, 77 were still in service and passed to the London, Midland and Scottish Railway who gave them power classification 1P, and renumbered them 6860 to 6939. Fifteen were still in service at nationalisation in 1948, but only two survived to receive their British Railways' number. None were preserved.
