= LNWR Webb Coal Tank =

Class of 300 two-cylinder locomotives

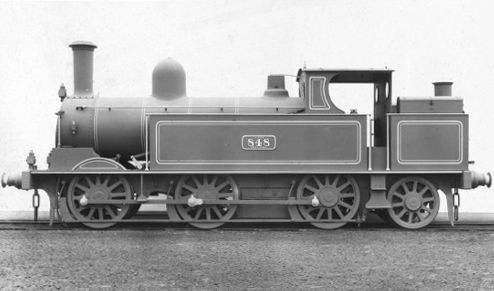
- No. 848 in photographic grey livery
Type and origin
- Power type: Steam
- Designer: Francis Webb
- Build date: 1881–1897
- Total produced: 300
Specifications
- Configuration
  - Whyte: 0-6-2T
  - UIC: C1n2Gt
- Gauge: 4 ft 8 1/2 in (1,435 mm) standard gauge
- Driver dia.: 4 ft 5 1/2 in (1.359 m)
- Loco weight: 43 long tons 15 cwt (98,000 lb or 44.5 t)
- Fuel type: Coal
- Boiler pressure: 150 psi (1.03 MPa)
- Superheater: None
- Cylinders: Two, inside
- Cylinder size: 17 in × 24 in (432 mm × 610 mm)
- Valve gear: Stephenson
- Valve type: Slide valves
Performance figures
- Tractive effort: 16,530 lbf (73.5 kN)
Career
- Operators: LNWR · LMS · BR
- Power class: 2F
- Number in class: 1 January 1923: 292, 1 January 1948: 64
- Withdrawn: 1921–1958
- Disposition: One preserved, remainder scrapped.

The London and North Western Railway (LNWR) Webb Coal Tank is a class of 0-6-2T steam locomotive. They were called "Coal Tanks" because they were a side tank version of Webb's standard LNWR 17in Coal Engine, an 0-6-0 tender engine for slow freight trains.

== Design ==
The design was introduced in 1881 by F.W. Webb and had the same cheaply produced cast iron wheels and H-section spokes as the tender engines. A trailing radial axle supporting the bunker was added also with two similarly cast iron wheels. Three hundred were built between 1881 and 1897.

== Operational history ==
Four (LNWR nos. 178, 484, 1257, 69) were withdrawn in January–February 1920 and a further four (LNWR nos. 142, 994, 782, 1012) in July and November 1922, so at the 1923 grouping, 292 passed to the London, Midland and Scottish Railway (LMS). They were renumbered from the LNWR's random allocation based on vacant numbers, to a solid block sequence 7550–7841, and given the power classification 1F. Many locomotives still in service in 1934 were renumbered by the addition of 20,000 to their number.

Sixty-four locomotives passed into British Railways ownership in January 1948 and they were numbered 58880–58937, but not all examples survived long enough to carry their BR numbers.

== Preservation ==
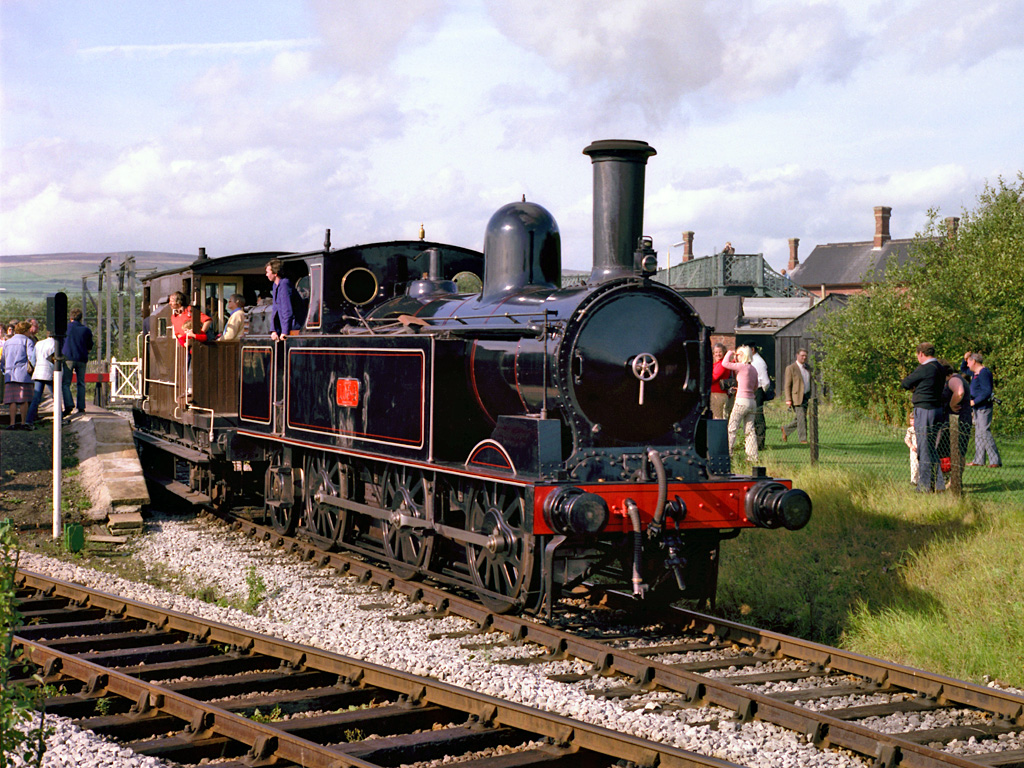
The sole survivor at Dinting in 1982

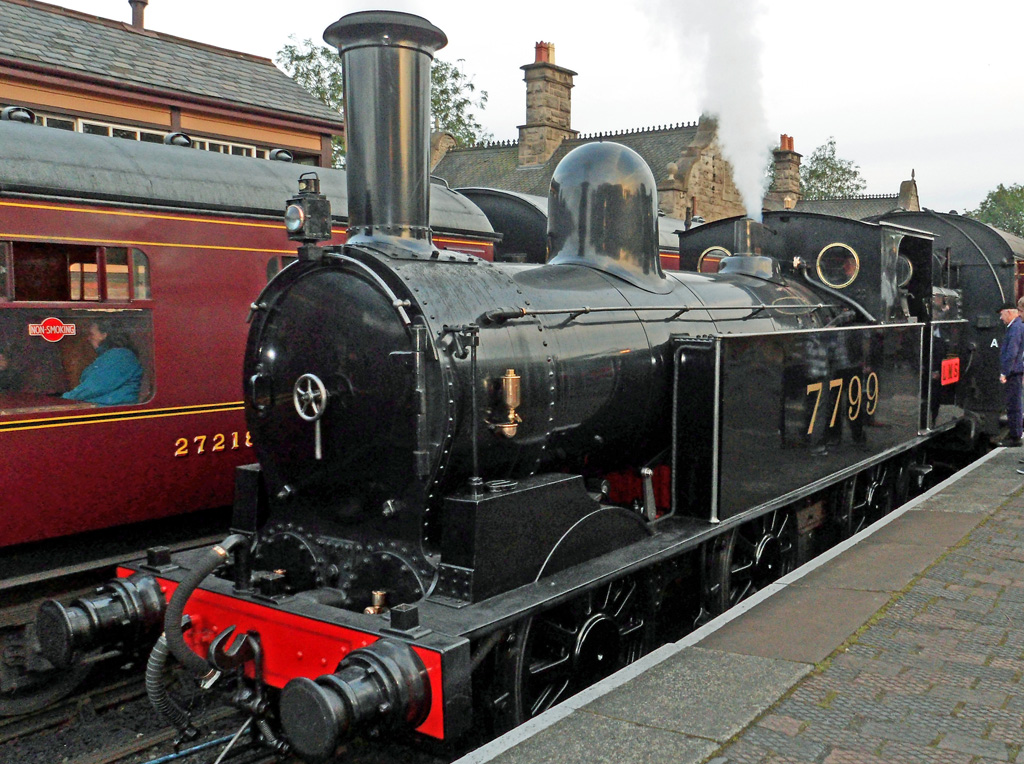
The surviving Coal Tank wearing LMS unlined 1920s livery as No. 7799 when visiting the Severn Valley Railway in September 2012

Coal Tank No. 58926, ex-LMS 7799, LNWR 1054 and 250th built, is preserved on the Keighley & Worth Valley Railway, normally carrying its LNWR livery and number. The locomotive was owned by the National Trust and is maintained and run by the Bahamas Locomotive Society.

In February 2024, the National Trust handed ownership of 1054 to the Bahamas Locomotive Society and will remain based at Ingrow West on the Keighley and Worth Valley Railway.

=== The Greatest Gathering ===
In March 2025, it was announced that 1054 was to appear at The Greatest Gathering which was taking place from Friday 1 to Sunday 3 August 2025 at Derby Litchurch Lane Works as part of the rail 200 celebrations to celebrate 200 years of railways and the opening of the Stockton and Darlington Railway in 1825. During the event 1054 was placed on display positioned on the works own turntable slowly rotating.

The BLS's second operational locomotive LMS Jubilee No. 45596 'Bahamas' also appeared at the event on display at the front of the site.

== Models ==
Bachmann Branchline released a model of the coal tanks in 2017. The three variants released were: -LNWR Black 1054 (As preserved) -LMS Black 7841 -BR Black early emblem 58900 So far, these are the only variants in production with no other liveries announced.
