= LNWR 17in Coal Engine =

Class of British steam locomotives

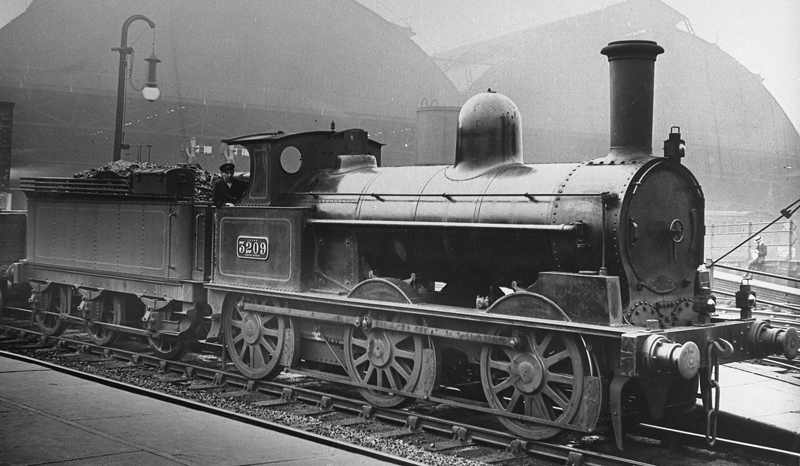
- No. 3209 stands outside London Road station, Manchester
Type and origin
- Power type: Steam
- Designer: Francis Webb
- Builder: LNWR, Crewe Works
- Build date: 1873–1892
- Total produced: 499
Specifications
- Configuration
  - Whyte: 0-6-0
- Gauge: 4 ft 8 1/2 in (1,435 mm)
- Driver dia.: 4 ft 3 in (1.295 m)
- Wheelbase: 15 ft 6 in (4.724 m)
- Loco weight: 32.00 long tons (32.5 t)
- Fuel type: Coal
- Water cap.: 1,800 imperial gallons (8,200 L; 2,200 US gal)
- Firebox
  - Grate area: 17.1 sq ft (1.59 m^{2})
- Boiler pressure: 140 psi (0.97 MPa)
- Heating surface
  - Tubes: 1,074.6 sq ft (99.83 m^{2})
- Cylinders: Two, inside
- Cylinder size: 17 in × 24 in (432 mm × 610 mm)
- Valve gear: Stephenson
- Valve type: Slide valves
Performance figures
- Tractive effort: 16,530 lbf (73.5 kN)
Career
- Operators: LNWR; S&MR; ROD; British Expeditionary Force; Palestine Military Railway; LMS; BR
- Power class: LMS/BR: 2F
- Locale: London Midland Region; Western Region (briefly)
- Withdrawn: 1921–1953
- Disposition: All scrapped

The LNWR 17in Coal Engine was a class of 0-6-0 steam tender engines designed by Francis Webb for the London and North Western Railway. They were simple locomotives and in UK service they were very reliable. "17in" refers to their cylinder diameter in inches. They were called "Coal Engines" because they were used for hauling coal trains.

== Design and construction ==
The 17in Coal Engine was the first new design of engine to be built by Webb since he became Chief Engineer of the LNWR in September 1871. A policy of 'low costs' was in force at the LNWR, with running costs per engine mile reduced from 10 3/4d per engine mile in 1857 to 7 3/4d by 1871. The first 17in Coal Engine was constructed in 1873, the first of almost five hundred built. Ernest L. Ahrons is quoted as regarding the type as "probably the simplest and cheapest locomotives ever made in this country", and O. S. Nock described them as "splendid".

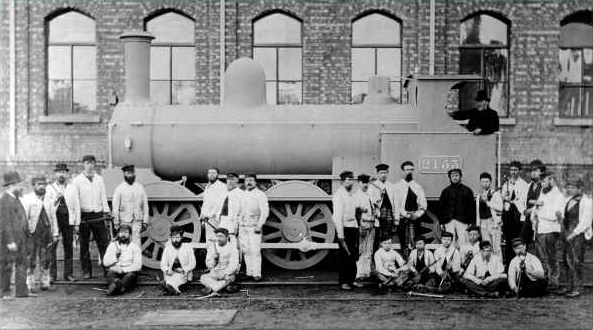
No. 1140 (works number 2153 was built from raw materials and in steam within 25 1/2 hours in February 1878

Many aspects of the 17in Coal's design reflected John Ramsbottom's final design: the 0-6-0 Special Tank, including the identical wheel diameter and cylinder dimensions, but the new engines had a larger, improved boiler. In February 1878, one engine of this design was built from scratch in 25 1/2 hours.

== Operation ==
During the First World War the Railway Operating Division of the Royal Engineers took many Coal Engines for use overseas, including many to the British Expeditionary Force in France and 42 to the Palestine Military Railway. Those in Palestine were reported to have performed badly and Palestine Railways sold them all for scrap by 1922. This may have been due partly to the poor quality of water used in Palestine.

227 Coal Engines passed into LMS stock after the 1923 grouping. 35 survived until the nationalisation of Britain's Railways in 1948 and entered British Railways stock. BR numbers were 58321-58361 (with gaps).

== Rebuilds ==
Between 1905 and 1907, 45 Coal Engines were rebuilt as tank locomotives with a single square saddle tank perched on the boiler and a small coal bunker behind the cab.

== Bibliography ==
- ABC of British Railways Locomotives, Part Three. Ian Allan. 1948. p. 51.
- Cotterell, Paul (1984). The Railways of Palestine and Israel. Tourret Publishing. pp. 28, 57, 127. ISBN 0-905878-04-3.
- Hughes, Hugh (1981). Middle East Railways. Continental Railway Circle. pp. 98, 116. ISBN 0-9503469-7-7.
- Nock, O.S. (1952). The Premier Line – The Story of London & North Western Locomotives. Ian Allan. pp. 64–65.
