= LNWR Dock Tank =

LNWR 317 class 4′ 3″ Saddle Tank Shunter
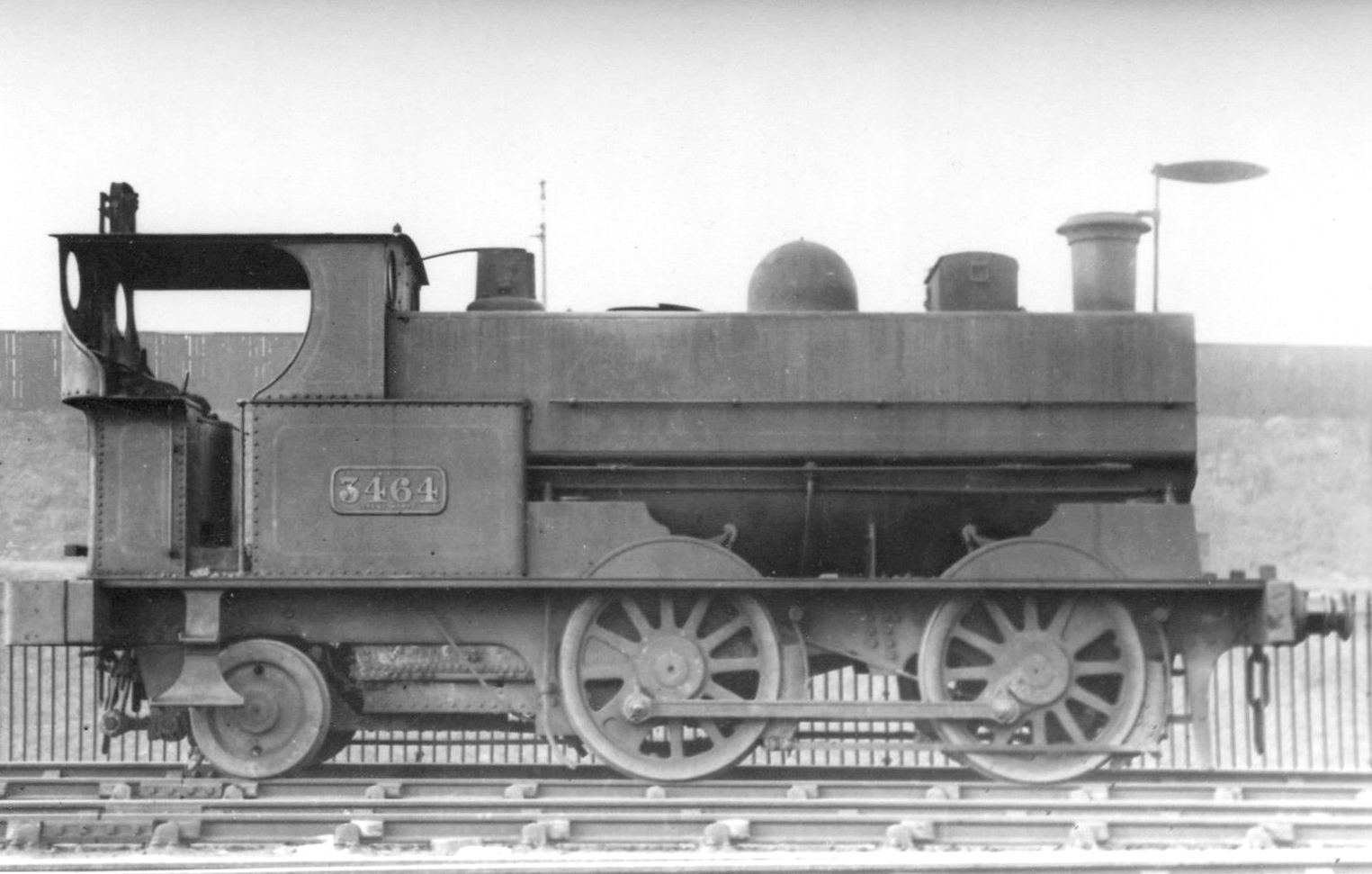
- Locomotive 317, Crewe Works No.3464
Type and origin
- Power type: Steam
- Builder: Crewe Works
- Serial number: 3741, 3946, 3977–3984, 4175–4184
- Build date: 1896–1901
- Total produced: 20
Specifications
- Configuration
  - Whyte: 0-4-2ST
  - UIC: B1′ n2t
- Gauge: 4 ft 8 1/2 in (1,435 mm)
- Driver dia.: 4 ft 3 in (1.295 m) + 2 1/2-inch (64 mm) tyres
- Trailing dia.: 2 ft 6 in (0.762 m)
- Wheelbase: Coupled: 7 ft 3 in (2.21 m); Loco: 15 ft 6 in (4.72 m)
- Loco weight: 34 long tons 17 cwt (78,100 lb or 35.4 t)
- Fuel type: Coal
- Fuel capacity: 1.5 long tons (1.5 t)
- Water cap.: 620 imp gal (2,800 L; 740 US gal)
- Firebox
  - Grate area: 15 sq ft (1.4 m^{2})
- Boiler pressure: 150 lbf/in^{2} (1.03 MPa)
- Heating surface: 967 sq ft (89.8 m^{2})
- Cylinders: Two, inside
- Cylinder size: 17 in × 24 in (432 mm × 610 mm)
Career
- Operators: London and North Western Railway; London, Midland and Scottish Railway; British Railways
- Power class: LMS: 1P, later 0F
- Number in class: 1 January 1923: 20; 1 January 1948: 2
- Nicknames: Bissel tanks
- Locale: London Midland Region
- Withdrawn: 1927–1938, 1953, 1956
- Disposition: All scrapped

The LNWR 317 class, (also known as Saddle Tank Shunter, Dock Tank or Bissel Tank) consisted of a class of 20 square saddle-tanked steam locomotives built by the London and North Western Railway at their Crewe Works between 1896 and 1901. They had a very short coupled wheelbase, with a trailing Bissel truck to carry weight.

== History ==
They were built in three batches of 1, 9 and 10; their first running number was chosen at random from the numbers left vacant by locomotives that had been transferred to the duplicate list. This fate was almost immediately suffered by the 317 class – after only one or two months in service.

All passed to the London, Midland and Scottish Railway in 1923, who initially allocated them the numbers 6400–6419 in the passenger tank sequence. Only five (6402/03/07/14/18) had been renumbered before the numbers were changed to 7850–7869 in 1927, thus moving them into the goods and shunting tanks. The LMS changed their power classification from 1P to 0F at the same time.

Two, 7862 and 7865, survived to enter British Railways service in 1948; 7865 was withdrawn in November 1953, and 7862 three years later. None were preserved.

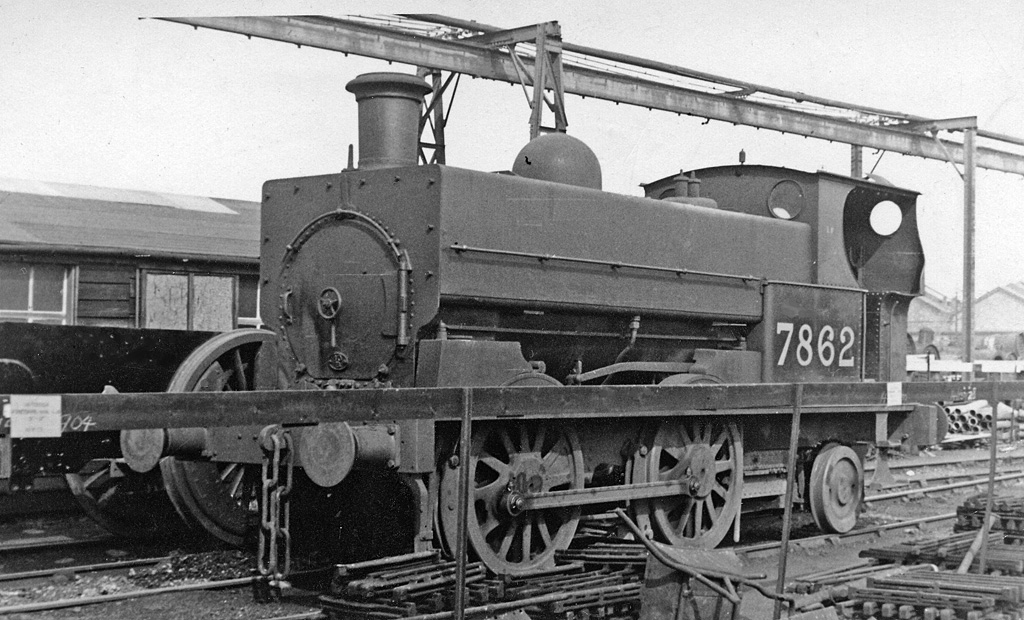
Bissel tank 7862 at Crewe Works in May 1948. It didn't receive its BR number until March 1949, and lasted until November 1956, by which time it was the last of its class.

== Fleet ==
Table of locomotives
First LNWR No.	Crewe Works no.	Build date	Duplicate LNWR No.	Date duplicated	1st LMS No.	2nd LMS No.	Date withdrawn	Notes
317	3741	Nov 1896	3464	Oct 1899	6400	7850	Nov 1930	
19	3946	Nov 1899	3465	Dec 1899	6401	7851	Nov 1932	
22	3977	Nov 1899	3466	Dec 1899	6402	7852	Nov 1927	
25	3978	Nov 1899	3467	Dec 1899	6403	7853	Aug 1932	
26	3979	Nov 1899	3468	Dec 1899	6404	7854	Dec 1930	
38	3980	Nov 1899	3469	Dec 1899	6405	7855	Jul 1936	
39	3981	Nov 1899	3470	Dec 1899	6406	7856	Dec 1929	
47	3982	Nov 1899	3471	Dec 1899	6407	7857	Nov 1929	
49	3983	Nov 1899	3472	Dec 1899	6408	7858	Dec 1936	
51	3984	Nov 1899	3473	Dec 1899	6409	7859	Jun 1938	
813	4175	Oct 1901	3524	Dec 1901	6410	7860	Dec 1929	
815	4176	Oct 1901	3525	Dec 1901	6411	7861	Dec 1932	
823	4177	Nov 1901	3526	Dec 1901	6412	7862	Nov 1956	
826	4178	Nov 1901	3527	Dec 1901	6413	7863	Nov 1931	
843	4179	Nov 1901	3528	Dec 1901	6414	7864	Nov 1929	
859	4180	Nov 1901	3529	Jan 1902	6415	7865	Nov 1953	
898	4181	Nov 1901	3530	Jan 1902	6416	7866	Oct 1931	
899	4182	Nov 1901	3531	Jan 1902	6417	7867	Jun 1932	
904	4183	Nov 1901	3532	Jan 1902	6418	7868	Nov 1929	
905	4184	Nov 1901	3533	Jan 1902	6419	7869	Nov 1932	
