= LNWR Improved Precedent Class =

Class of British steam locomotives

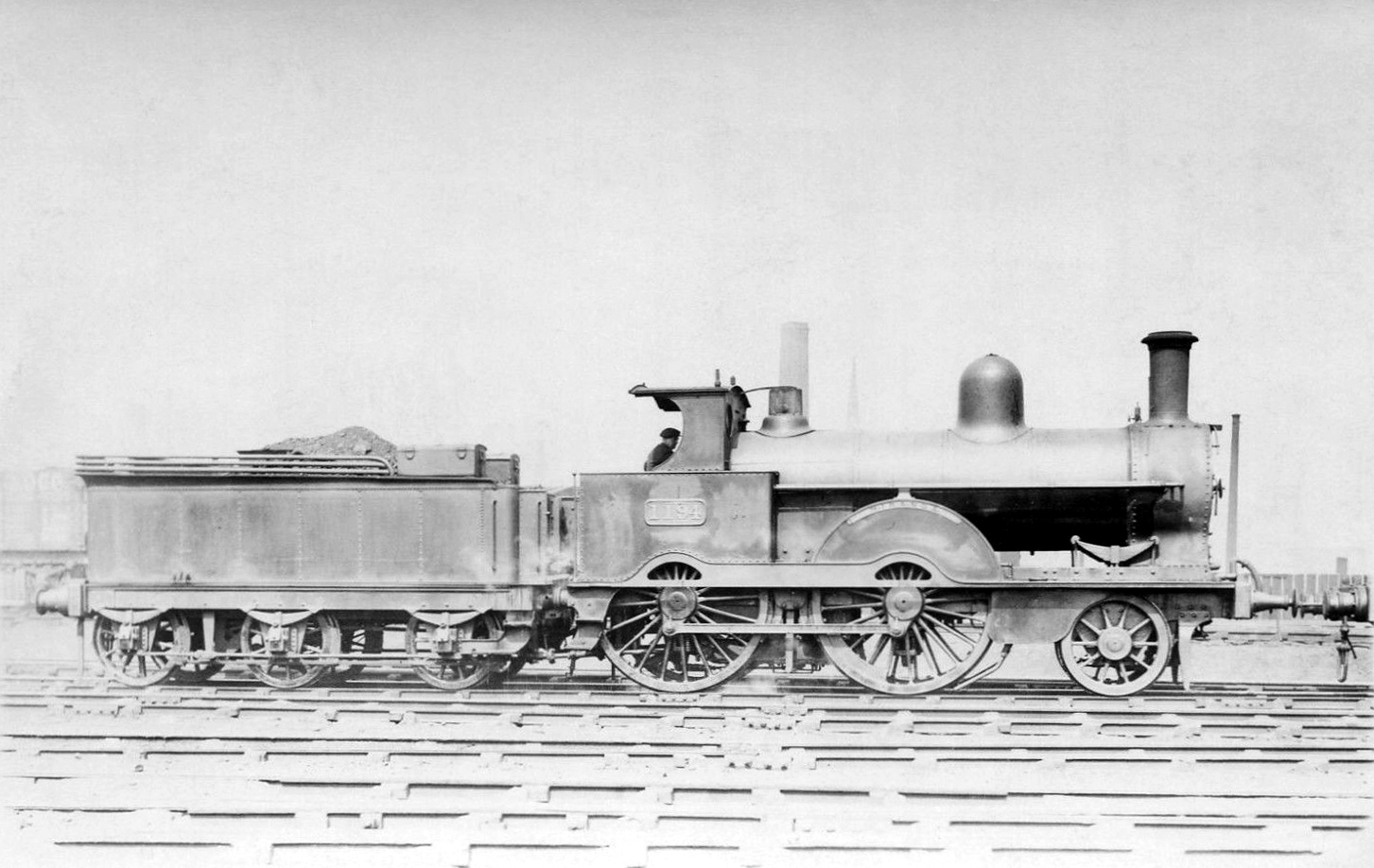
- No. 1194 Miranda
Type and origin
- Power type: Steam
- Designer: F. W. Webb
- Builder: Crewe Works
- Build date: 1887–1901
- Total produced: 158
Specifications
- Configuration
  - Whyte: 2-4-0
  - UIC: 1B n2
- Gauge: 4 ft 8 1/2 in (1,435 mm) standard gauge
- Leading dia.: 3 ft 6 in (1,067 mm) + 3-inch (76 mm) tyres
- Driver dia.: 6 ft 9 in (2,057 mm)
- Wheelbase: Coupled: 8 ft 3 in (2.51 m); Loco: 15 ft 8 in (4.78 m)
- Length: 44 ft 0 in (13.41 m)
- Loco weight: 35.60 long tons (36.17 t; 39.87 short tons)
- Fuel type: Coal
- Water cap.: 1,800 imp gal (8,200 L; 2,200 US gal), later 2,000 imp gal (9,100 L; 2,400 US gal)
- Boiler pressure: 150 lbf/in^{2} (1.03 MPa)
- Heating surface: 1,063.7 sq ft (98.82 m^{2})
- Cylinders: Two, inside
- Cylinder size: 17 in × 24 in (432 mm × 610 mm)
- Valve gear: Allan
Performance figures
- Tractive effort: 10,918 lbf (48.6 kN)
Career
- Operators: London and North Western Railway; → London, Midland and Scottish Railway
- Power class: LMS: 1P
- Number in class: 1 January 1923: 76
- Nicknames: Jumbos, large Jumbos
- Withdrawn: 1905–1933
- Disposition: One preserved, remainder scrapped

The London and North Western Railway (LNWR) Improved Precedent Class or Renewed Precedent Class is a class of 2-4-0 steam locomotives originally designed for express passenger work. They later gained the nickname of Jumbos.

== History ==
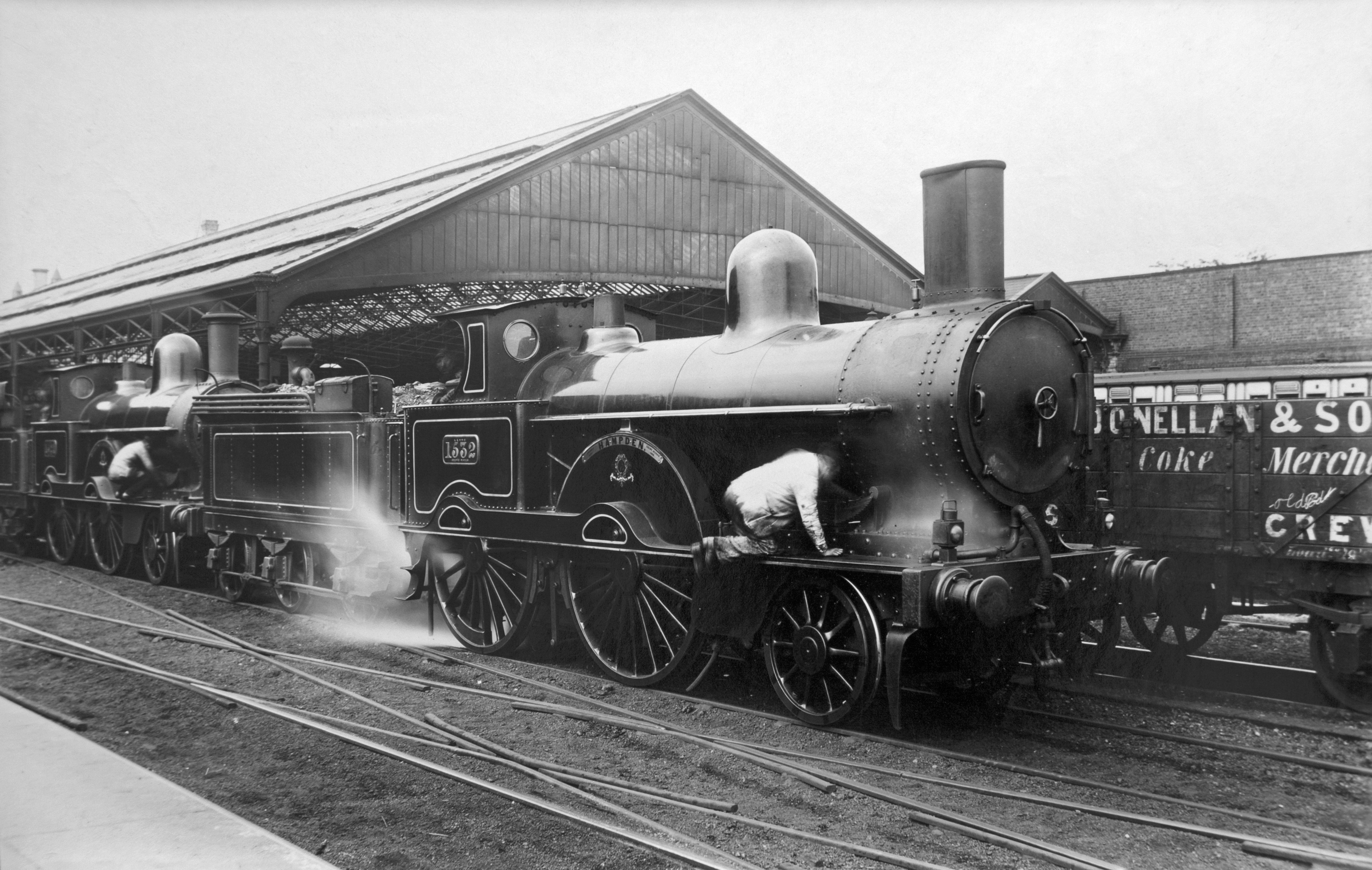
No. 1532 Hampden with a non-standard chimney

The locomotives were designed by F. W. Webb. A total of 158 were built in batches by Crewe Works 1887–1897 with two further additions in 1898 and 1901 respectively. They were officially "renewals" (i.e. replacements) of 96 Newton Class and 62 Precedent Class, so that, for accountancy purposes, they could be charged against the Revenue account rather than the Capital account of a "new" locomotive. On renewal, they kept the numbers and names of their predecessors, and as a result the numbering system continued to be completely haphazard. In addition, the eight Precedent class locomotives that were not renewed, were rebuilt to the Improved specification, but they retained their original 7/8-inch (22.2 mm) thick frames, whereas the renewed locomotives had 1-inch (25.4 mm) frames.

On 22 August 1895, 790 Hardwicke took 2 hours and 6 minutes for the 141 miles (227 km) from Crewe to Carlisle, with an average speed of 67.1 mph (108.0 km/h), setting up a new speed record during the Race to the North.

When George Whale (who succeeded Francis Webb in 1903) introduced his Precursor and Experiment Classes in March 1904 and April 1905 respectively, the Improved Precedents ultimately began seeing withdrawals, starting in December 1905. By the outbreak of the First World War in July 1914, only 112 Large Jumbos were in service.

The London, Midland and Scottish Railway acquired 76 upon the grouping of 1923, and gave them the power classification 1P. The LMS assigned these the numbers 5004–79, in order of build date, though not all received them as withdrawals continued apace. By 1933, the 4 remaining members of the class still left in service on the LMS' network were sent for scrap, with some members having served over 40 years by that point.

== Accidents and incidents ==
- On 15 August 1895, locomotive No. 275 Vulcan was one of two locomotives hauling an express passenger train that derailed at Preston, Lancashire due to excessive speed on a curve. One person was killed.
- On 27 October 1895, locomotive No. 790 Hardwicke was hauling an express passenger train that collided with a freight train at Preston. The express was derailed and Hardwicke was severely damaged. The accident was caused by the driver of the freight misreading signals.
- The Ditton Junction rail crash: On 17 September 1912, a late afternoon express train, packed with holidaymakers returning to Liverpool from Chester, hauled by Precedent class "Cook" left the rails just to the east of Ditton Junction railway station and crashed into the brickwork of the bridge that carried Hale Road over the railway. Thirteen passengers were killed.
- The Weedon rail crashes: On 14 August 1915, a locomotive hauling a passenger train suffered a mechanical defect which resulted in track being damaged at Weedon, Northamptonshire. Locomotive No. 1189 Stewart was one of two hauling a mail train that was derailed on the damaged track. Ten people were killed and 21 were injured.

== Preservation ==
790 Hardwicke in the Shildon 150 Cavalcade

One, No. 790 Hardwicke (built 1892, LMS No. 5031, withdrawn 1932) has been preserved as part of the National Railway Collection. It was overhauled at Carnforth in 1975 and took part in the Rail 150 cavalcade at Shildon. Afterwards it hauled some excursion trains on the main line, on one of which it double-headed with Flying Scotsman. In the same year it made a special run on the Settle - Carlisle railway, double heading with Midland compound 1000, to celebrate the line's centenary. During this period it was allocated TOPS number 98 190. It is currently a static exhibit in the National Railway Museum Shildon.

== Fleet list ==
LNWR/LMS fleet list
LNWR No.	Name	Crewe Works No.	Date built	LMS No.	Date scrapped	Notes
271	Minotaur	2996	June 1887	5004	December 1927	†
1132	North Western	2997	June 1887	—	May 1906	
1220	Belted Will	2998	June 1887	—	March 1921	
1487	Faraday	2999	1887	—	April 1907	
1670	Ganymede	3001	1887	—	December 1905	
1485	Smeaton	3022	December 1887	—	May 1914	
1749	Hibernia	3023	January 1888	—	May 1915	
275	Vulcan	3024	January 1888	—	December 1909	
1522	Pitt	3025	January 1888	5005	July 1932	
1679	Bunsen	3026	January 1888	—	December 1913	
1219	Lightning	3027	January 1888	—	February 1909	
1681	Minerva	3028	February 1888	—	August 1911	
1528	Frobisher	3029	February 1888	—	February 1916	
1527	Raleigh	3030	February 1888	5006	May 1925	†
1669	Ilion	3031	March 1888	—	January 1906	
941	Blenkinsop	3042	October 1888	5008	April 1925	†
1481	The Duke of Edinburgh	3043	October 1888	—	May 1913	
379	Sedgwick	3044	October 1888	5007	February 1928	
1517	Princess Helena	3045	November 1888	5009	October 1928	
1216	Premier	3046	November 1888	—	March 1921	
1480	Newton	3047	November 1888	5010	March 1928	
1685	Gladiator	3048	November 1888	5015	November 1927	
1212	Pioneer	3049	November 1888	5013	January 1928	
1211	John Ramsbottom	3050	November 1888	5012	December 1930	
1141	S. R. Graves	3051	November 1888	—	February 1907	
1488	Murdoch	3052	November 1888	5014	April 1932	
276	Pluto	3053	November 1888	—	July 1907	
696	Director	3054	November 1888	5011	1933	
1530	Columbus	3055	November 1888	—	November 1921	
1748	Britannia	3056	July 1889	5016	June 1928	
1482	Herschel	3057	January 1890	—	July 1908	
1677	Badajos	3058	January 1890	—	October 1922	
1526	Drake	3059	January 1890	—	August 1907	
1529	Cook	3060	September 1889	—	December 1912	
1521	Gladstone	3061	September 1889	5017	March 1926	†
974	Richard Cobden	3062	January 1890	—	March 1919	
1742	Bevere	3063	February 1890	—	July 1912	
1513	Shakespeare	3064	February 1890	—	April 1911	
1672	Talavera	3065	February 1890	5018	1933	
1486	Dalton	3066	March 1890	—	April 1914	
1524	Wolfe	3067	March 1890	—	July 1908	
1483	Newcomen	3068	March 1890	—	January 1909	
1515	Milton	3069	May 1890	—	November 1914	
382	Buckingham	3070	May 1890	—	November 1921	
308	Booth	3071	May 1890	—	October 1922	
2006	Princess	3142	November 1890	5021	April 1932	
1514	Scott	3143	November 1890	—	November 1914	
1214	Prince Albert	3144	November 1890	—	April 1914	
1218	Phaeton	3145	November 1890	—	June 1911	
1674	Delhi	3146	November 1890	5020	November 1930	
2001	Henry Crosfield	3147	November 1890	—	January 1912	
1531	Cromwell	3148	November 1890	5019	July 1928	
1484	Telford	3149	November 1890	—	August 1915	
1683	Sisyphus	3150	April 1891	—	January 1908	
396	Tennyson	3151	May 1891	—	November 1921	
1675	Vimiera	3192	May 1891	5024	September 1926	†
1747	John Mayall	3193	May 1891	—	December 1905	
1673	Lucknow	3194	May 1891	—	March 1919	
1525	Abercrombie	3195	May 1891	5022	December 1928	
1668	Dagmar	3196	May 1891	5023	1932	
1676	The Nile	3197	May 1891	—	September 1906	
2004	Witch	3198	May 1891	—	July 1912	
1020	Wordsworth	3199	May 1891	—	January 1909	
1518	Countess	3200	May 1891	5025	January 1926	†
1520	Franklin	3201	May 1891	5027	1933	
380	Quernmore	3242	June 1891	—	October 1922	
1666	Ariadne	3243	June 1891	5028	September 1925	†
1680	Livingstone	3244	June 1891	—	April 1913	
1217	Florence	3245	June 1891	—	November 1915	
2003	Alecto	3246	June 1891	—	January 1907	
2002	Madge	3247	June 1891	5030	December 1928	
1516	Byron	3248	June 1891	—	July 1907	
1684	Speke	3249	June 1891	5029	September 1931	
1671	Shamrock	3250	June 1891	—	August 1906	
1519	Duchess	3251	June 1891	5026	October 1928	
1744	Magdala	3282	April 1892	—	August 1915	
1745	John Bright	3283	April 1892	5034	November 1930	Glowworm from July 1914
1532	Hampden	3284	June 1892	—	April 1911	
304	Hector	3285	June 1892	5035	July 1928	
790	Hardwicke	3286	April 1892	5031	—	Withdrawn February 1932. Preserved in National Collection
1213	The Queen	3287	April 1892	5032	February 1932	
403	Isabella	3288	April 1892	—	September 1922	
1678	Airey	3289	April 1892	5033	February 1927	†
395	Scotia	3290	June 1892	—	November 1919	
1682	Novelty	3291	June 1892	5036	July 1928	
1489	Brindley	3343	April 1893	—	April 1911	
394	Eamont	3344	April 1893	—	September 1921	
942	Shah of Persia	3345	April 1893	—	January 1916	
393	Brougham	3346	April 1893	—	March 1907	
1667	Corunna	3347	April 1893	5039	April 1928	
295	Penmaenmawr	3348	April 1893	—	March 1909	
1523	Marlborough	3349	April 1893	—	February 1909	
381	Patterdale	3350	April 1893	5037	December 1927	†
787	Clarendon	3351	April 1893	5038	July 1927	†
1215	Albion	3352	April 1893	—	March 1908	
2005	Lynx	3352	January 1894	5041	December 1930	
919	Nasmyth	3490	December 1893	5040	August 1928	
2178	Pluck	3491	January 1894	—	September 1922	
1173	The Auditor	3492	January 1894	5042	June 1930	
482	Pegasus	3493	January 1894	—	October 1914	
2192	Caradoc	3494	January 1894	5043	July 1927	†
871	Proserpine	3506	May 1894	5044	August 1925	†
265	Thomas Carlyle	3507	July 1894	5045	May 1930	
789	Breadalbane	3508	July 1894	—	December 1914	
865	Envoy	3509	July 1894	5046	October 1928	
867	Disraeli	3510	July 1894	—	August 1915	
364	Henry Pease	3531	October 1894	5048	September 1930	
883	Phantom	3532	August 1894	5049	September 1928	†
256	President Washington	3533	August 1894	5047	February 1923	†
2175	Precedent	3534	November 1894	—	April 1915	
860	Merrie Carlisle	3535	November 1894	5050	1933	
253	President Garfield	3556	February 1895	—	August 1921	
2188	Chillington	3557	February 1895	—	July 1908	
254	President Lincoln	3558	February 1895	—	July 1908	
890	Sir Hardman Earle	3559	February 1895	5051	October 1928	
2182	Giraffe	3560	February 1895	—	May 1922	
749	Mercury	3571	May 1895	5052	May 1927	†
2183	Antelope	3572	May 1895	5054	June 1930	
945	Humphrey Davy	3573	June 1895	5053	December 1930	
872	Wizard	3574	August 1895	—	May 1922	
2177	Edward Tootal	3575	August 1895	—	June 1911	
514	Lawrence	3596	October 1895	5055	August 1926	† Puck from June 1913
260	Duke of Connaught	3597	February 1896	—	August 1914	
866	Courier	3598	January 1896	5057	December 1928	
2186	Lowther	3599	January 1896	5067	December 1927	†
2193	Salopian	3600	February 1896	5059	October 1925	†
517	Marathon	3611	January 1896	—	April 1921	
2185	Alma	3612	January 1896	5058	November 1928	
477	Caractacus	3613	February 1896	5056	September 1927	†
619	Mabel	3614	February 1896	5060	May 1926	†
2176	Robert Benson	3615	April 1896	5061	June 1927	†
1177	Princess Louise	3656	March 1896	—	February 1920	
264	Buckland	3657	January 1896	—	April 1907	†
864	Pilot	3658	June 1896	5063	July 1927	†
1187	Chandos	3659	July 1896	5064	September 1930	
506	Sir Alexander Cockburn	3660	July 1896	5062	February 1932	
1183	Plynlimmon	3681	August 1896	—	January 1911	
1193	Joshua Radcliffe	3682	August 1896	—	March 1913	
478	Commodore	3683	August 1896	5065	September 1926	†
2194	Cambrian	3684	October 1896	5066	May 1925	†
868	Condor	3685	November 1896	—	May 1911	
869	Llewellyn	3726	November 1896	—	January 1922	
2187	Penrith Beacon	3727	December 1896	5069	July 1932	
1194	Miranda	3728	February 1897	5068	June 1930	
262	Wheatstone	3729	April 1897	5070	July 1932	
480	Duchess of Lancaster	3730	February 1897	5071	September 1927	†
2180	Perseverance	3742	March 1897	5073	February 1926	†
193	Rocket	3743	March 1897	5072	January 1926	†
2184	Reynard	3744	May 1897	—	March 1919	
858	Sir Salar Jung	3745	May 1897	—	July 1912	
2179	Patience	3746	May 1897	—	January 1920	
1189	Stewart	3777	June 1897	—	December 1922	
2189	Avon	3778	July 1897	5076	August 1927	†
862	Balmoral	3779	July 1897	5075	1931	
857	Prince Leopold	3780	July 1897	5074	July 1928	†
1105	Hercules	3781	December 1897	5077	July 1928	†
870	Fairbairn	3782	March 1898	5078	December 1928	
861	Amazon	3783	September 1901	5079	August 1925	†

† LMS number allocated, but never applied

== In fiction ==
No.790 “Hardwicke” has appeared in the episode 1 and OVA of “Unbreakable Machine-Doll”, the 2013 Japanese animation. In the series, the nameplate spells “Hardrock”.
