= LNWR 1400 Class =

Class of locomotive

LNWR 1400 Class "Bill Baileys"
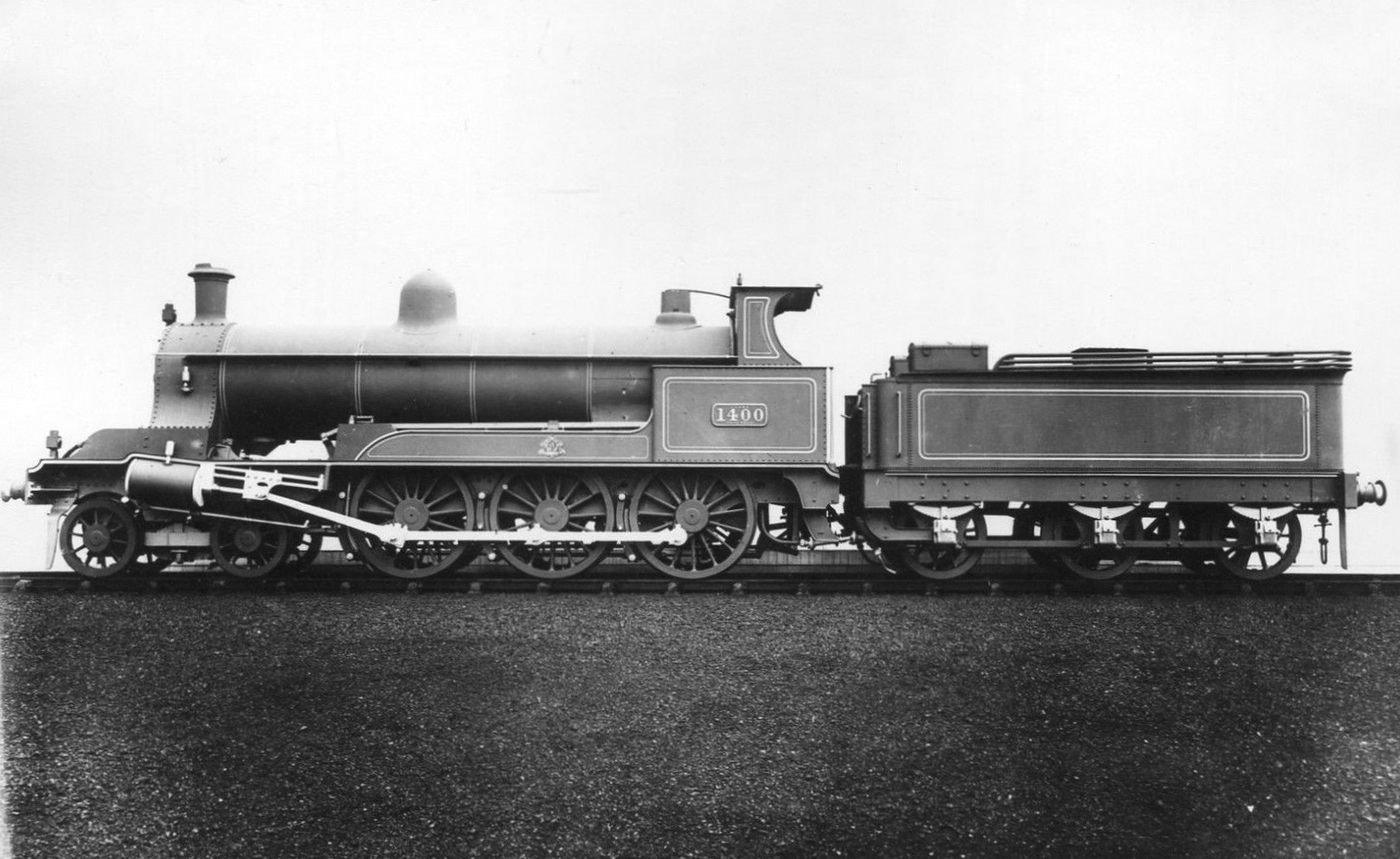
- No. 1400 in photographic grey livery
Type and origin
- Power type: Steam
- Designer: F. W. Webb
- Builder: Crewe Works
- Serial number: 4365, 4376–4384, 4420–4439
- Build date: 1903–1905
- Total produced: 30
Specifications
- Configuration
  - Whyte: 4-6-0
  - UIC: 2′C n4v
- Gauge: 4 ft 8 1/2 in (1,435 mm)
- Leading dia.: 3 ft 1 1/2 in (0.953 m)
- Driver dia.: 5 ft 3 in (1.600 m)
- Loco weight: 60 long tons (61 t)
- Heating surface: 1,753 sq ft (162.9 m^{2})
- Cylinders: Four, compound; HP outside, LP inside
- High-pressure cylinder: 15 in × 24 in (381 mm × 610 mm)
- Low-pressure cylinder: 20 1/2 in × 24 in (521 mm × 610 mm)
Career
- Operators: London and North Western Railway
- Nicknames: Bill Baileys
- Scrapped: Nov 1913 – Mar 1921
- Disposition: All scrapped

The London and North Western Railway (LNWR) 1400 Class, commonly known as Bill Baileys after the popular little music hall number "Won't You Come Home Bill Bailey", was a class of 4-cylinder 4-6-0 compound locomotives. Essentially a Class B compound 0-8-0 with different wheel arrangement, 30 were built starting in 1903, intended for a mixed traffic role. The first was withdrawn in 1913, with several more following during the First World War, cannibalised to keep Class Bs running. The last was withdrawn and scrapped in 1921.
