= LNWR Special Tank =

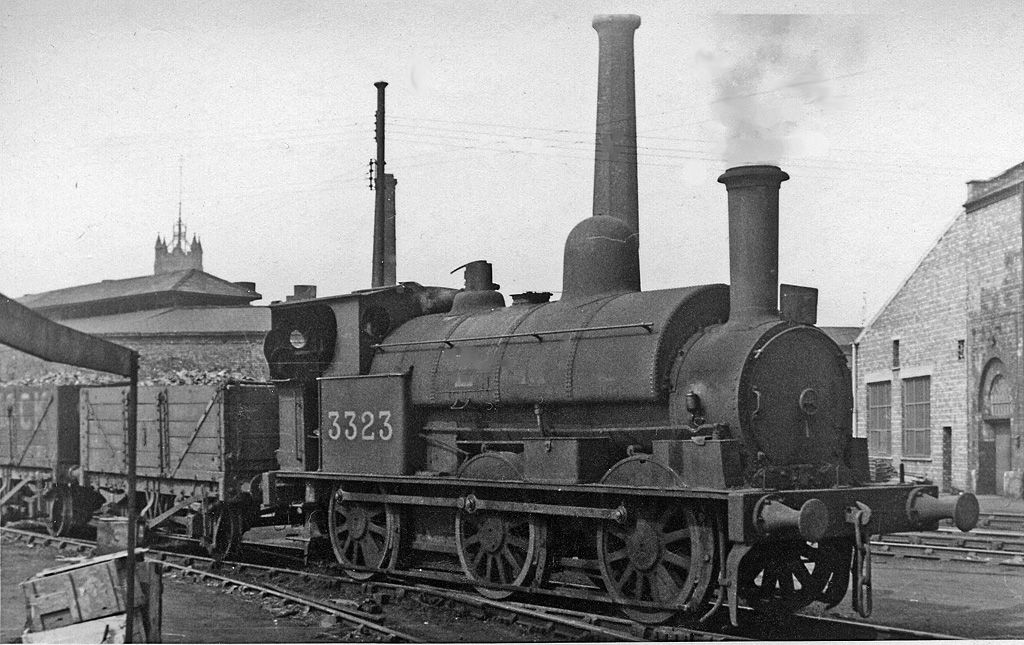
- Crewe Works shunter No. 3323 still carrying its LNWR number in May 1948
Type and origin
- Power type: Steam
- Designer: John Ramsbottom
- Builder: Crewe Works
- Serial number: 1310–1319, 1330–1339, 1434–1463, 1562–1581, 1702–1721, 1822–1841, 1942–1961, 2024–2033, 2094–2113, 2154–2213, 2289–2308, 2339-2358
- Build date: 1870–1880
- Total produced: 278
Specifications
- Configuration
  - Whyte: 0-6-0ST
  - UIC: C n2t
- Gauge: 4 ft 8 1/2 in (1,435 mm)
- Driver dia.: 4 ft 3 in (1.295 m) + 2 1/2 inches (64 mm) tyres
- Wheelbase: 15 ft 6 in (4.72 m)
- Loco weight: 34 long tons (34.5 t; 38.1 short tons)
- Fuel capacity: 1.5 long tons (1.52 t; 1.68 short tons)
- Water cap.: 600 imperial gallons (2,700 L; 720 US gal)
- Firebox
  - Grate area: 15 sq ft (1.4 m^{2})
- Boiler pressure: 150 lbf/in^{2} (1.03 MPa)
- Heating surface: 1,068.8 sq ft (99.29 m^{2})
- Cylinders: Two, inside
- Cylinder size: 17 in × 24 in (432 mm × 610 mm)
Career
- Operators: London and North Western Railway; London, Midland and Scottish Railway; British Railways
- Locale: London Midland Region
- Withdrawn: 1918–1958
- Disposition: All scrapped

The London and North Western Railway (LNWR) Special Tank was a class of 0-6-0ST steam locomotive. They were a saddle tank version of the LNWR DX Goods Class. A total of 278 locomotives were built from 1870 onwards, of which five survived to be inherited by British Railways in 1948. These five were in departmental stock:

- Four – numbered 3 (né 317), 6, 7 (2329) and 8 Earlstown (2359) – as Carriage Department shunters at Wolverton Works
- No. 3323 (né 2322 May 1878), a shunter at Crewe Works.

All members of the class were scrapped.
