= LNWR Precedent Class =

LNWR Precedent class
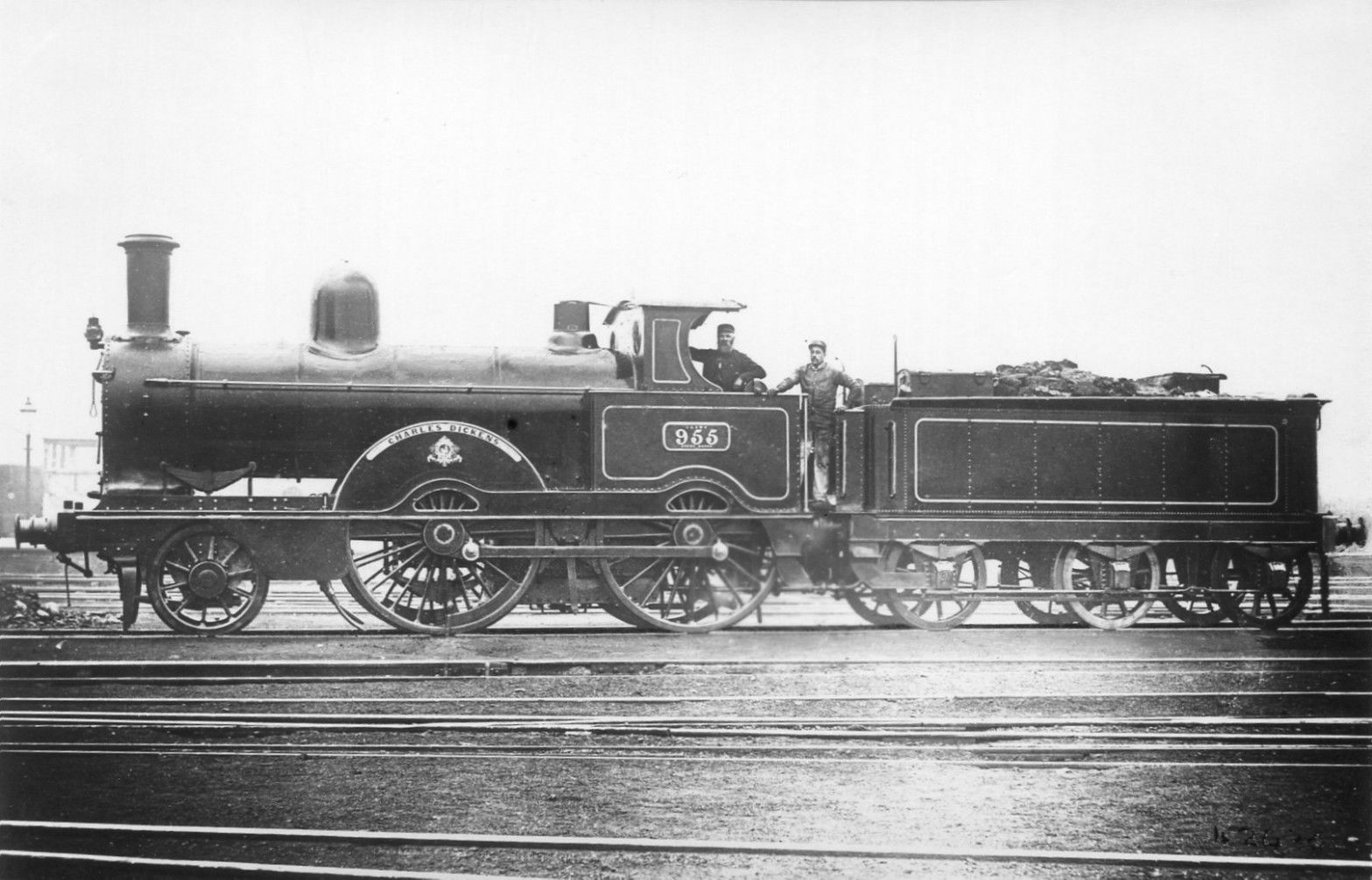
- LNWR 955 Charles Dickens, date and location unknown
Type and origin
- Power type: Steam
- Designer: F. W. Webb
- Builder: Crewe Works
- Serial number: 1902–1921, 2034–2053, 2119–2128, 2400–2409, 2501–2510
- Build date: 1874–1882
- Total produced: 70
Specifications
- Configuration
  - Whyte: 2-4-0
  - UIC: 1B n2
- Gauge: 4 ft 8 1/2 in (1,435 mm)
- Leading dia.: 3 ft 6 in (1.067 m)
- Driver dia.: 6 ft 6 in (1.981 m)
- Wheelbase: 7 ft 5 in (2.26 m)+; 8 ft 3 in (2.515 m)
- Loco weight: 33 long tons (34 t)
- Fuel type: Coal
- Boiler
  - Diameter: 4 ft 2 in (1.270 m)
  - Tube plates: 9 ft 10 in (2.997 m)
- Heating surface: 1,083 sq ft (100.6 m^{2})
- Cylinders: Two, inside
- Cylinder size: 17 in × 24 in (432 mm × 610 mm)
- Valve gear: Allan
Career
- Operators: London and North Western Railway
- Official name: Precedent Class
- Nicknames: Jumbo's
- Disposition: All scrapped

The London and North Western Railway Precedent Class was a class of seventy 2-4-0 steam locomotives originally designed for express passenger work.

== History ==
They were designed by F. W. Webb and built by the LNWR's Crewe Works between 1874 and 1882. The numbering was haphazard – while the first twenty carried "new" numbers in a solid block, the remaining fifty were given numbers formerly carried by withdrawn locomotives. All seventy carried names from new, many of which had been used on withdrawn locomotives.

Between 1893 and 1901, sixty-two of the locomotives were "renewed" (i.e. replaced with new locomotives carrying the same number and name) as Improved Precedent class locomotives.

The remaining eight were rebuilt as Improved Precedents in the 1890s; they retained their 7/8 inch (22.2 mm) thick frames – the renewals had 1-inch (25.4 mm) frames.

Two of the unrenewed locomotives were scrapped in 1907, and two in the 1910s, with four passing to the London Midland and Scottish Railway in 1923. They were allocated numbers 5000–5003 and were withdrawn between 1929 and 1934. The last of these, 5001 Snowdon, had 20000 added to its number six months before withdrawal in order to release its old number for an LMS Stanier Class 5 4-6-0.

== Accidents and incidents ==
- On 7 December 1925, locomotive 1170 General ran through a set of level crossing gates and struck a bus at Fenny Stratford; nine bus passengers died.

== Fleet list ==
List of Locomotives
LNWR No.	Name	Crewe Works No.	Date built	Date renewed	Date scrapped	Notes
2175	Precedent	1902	Dec 1874	Nov 1894	—	
2176	Robert Benson	1903	Feb 1875	Feb 1896	—	
2177	Edward Tootal	1904	Mar 1875	Aug 1895	—	
2178	Pluck	1905	Mar 1875	Jan 1894	—	
2179	Patience	1906	Mar 1875	May 1897	—	
2180	Perseverance	1907	Mar 1875	Mar 1897	—	
2181	Buffalo	1908	Mar 1875	—	July 1907	Rebuilt 1887, 1893 and 1902
2182	Giraffe	1909	Mar 1875	Feb 1895	—	
2183	Antelope	1910	Mar 1875	May 1895	—	
2184	Reynard	1911	Mar 1875	May 1897	—	
2185	Alma	1912	Apr 1875	Jan 1896	—	
2186	Lowther	1913	Apr 1875	Jan 1896	—	
2187	Penrith Beacon	1914	Apr 1875	Dec 1896	—	
2188	Chillington	1915	Apr 1875	Feb 1895	—	
2188	Avon	1916	Apr 1875	July 1897	—	
2190	Beatrice	1917	Apr 1875	—	Jul 1932	Renamed Lady Beatrice, then Princess Beatrice; rebuilt Nov 1895, to LMS 5000
2191	Snowdon	1918	Apr 1875	—	Oct 1934	Rebuilt Nov 1892; to LMS 5001; renumbered 25001
2192	Caradoc	1919	Apr 1875	Jan 1894	—	
2193	Salopian	1920	May 1875	Jan 1896	—	
2194	Cambrian	1921	May 1875	Oct 1896	—	
890	Sir Hardman Earle	2034	Apr 1877	Feb 1895	—	
1177	Princess Louise	2035	Apr 1877	Mar 1896	—	
857	Prince Leopold	2036	Apr 1877	Jul 1897	—	
858	Sir Salar Jung	2037	May 1877	May 1897	—	
861	Amazon	2038	May 1877	Sep 1901	—	
860	Merrie Carlisle	2039	May 1877	Nov 1894	—	
862	Balmoral	2040	May 1877	Jul 1897	—	
863	Meteor	2041	May 1877	—	Oct 1907	Rebuilt 1890s
864	Pilot	2042	May 1877	Mar 1896	—	
865	Envoy	2043	May 1877	Jul 1894	—	
866	Courier	2044	May 1877	Jan 1896	—	
1189	Stewart	2045	May 1877	Jun 1897	—	
883	Phantom	2046	May 1877	Aug 1894	—	
1105	Hercules	2047	May 1877	Dec 1897	—	
867	Disraeli	2048	Jun 1877	Jul 1894	—	
868	Condor	2049	Jun 1877	Oct 1896	—	
869	Llewellyn	2050	Jun 1877	Nov 1896	—	
870	Fairbairn	2051	Jun 1877	Mar 1898	—	
871	Proserpine	2052	Jun 1877	May 1894	—	
872	Wizard	2053	Jun 1877	Aug 1895	—	
1173	The Auditor	2219	Aug 1878	Jan 1894	—	
1193	Joshua Radcliffe	2220	Aug 1878	Aug 1896	—	
1194	Miranda	2221	Sep 1878	Dec 1896	—	
749	Mercury	2222	Sep 1878	May 1895	—	
517	Marathon	2223	Sep 1878	Jan 1896	—	
1170	General	2224	Sep 1878	—	1931	Rebuilt 1890s; to LMS 5002
919	Nasmyth	2225	Sep 1878	Dec 1893	—	
193	Rocket	2226	Sep 1878	Mar 1897	—	
1183	Plynlimmon	2227	Sep 1878	Aug 1896	—	
1187	Chandos	2228	Sep 1878	Jul 1896	—	
619	Mabel	2400	Oct 1880	Feb 1896	—	Exhibited at the Stephenson Centenary, 1881
789	Breadalbane	2401	Oct 1880	Jul 1894	—	
477	Caractacus	2402	Nov 1880	Jan 1896	—	
478	Commodore	2403	Nov 1880	Aug 1896	—	
480	Duchess of Lancaster	2404	Nov 1880	Feb 1897	—	
482	Pegasus	2405	Nov 1880	Jan 1894	—	
506	Sir Alexander Cockburn	2406	Nov 1880	Jul 1896	—	
512	Lazonby	2407	Nov 1880	—	Aug 1929	Rebuilt 1890s; to LMS 5003
514	Lawrence	2408	Nov 1880	Oct 1895	—	
945	Humphrey Davy	2409	Nov 1880	May 1895	—	
253	President Garfield	2501	Jan 1882	Feb 1895	—	
254	President Lincoln	2502	Jan 1882	Feb 1895	—	
256	President Washington	2503	Jan 1882	Aug 1894	—	
257	Duke of Albany	2504	Jan 1882	—	Apr 1915	Rebuilt 1890s
260	Duke of Connaught	2505	Jan 1882	Oct 1895	—	
262	Wheatstone	2506	Jan 1882	Jan 1897	—	
264	Buckland	2507	Jan 1882	Jan 1896	—	
265	Thomas Carlisle	2508	Jan 1882	Jul 1894	—	
364	Henry Pease	2509	Feb 1882	Aug 1894	—	
955	Charles Dickens	2510	Feb 1882	—	Oct 1912	Rebuilt 1890s
