= LNWR Teutonic Class =

Locomotive class

LNWR Teutonic class
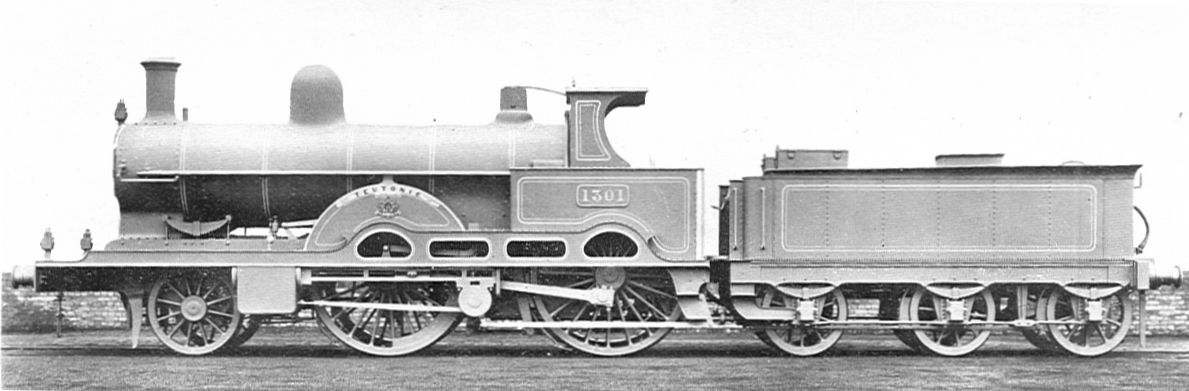
- No. 1301 Teutonic Crewe Works portrait
Type and origin
- Power type: Steam
- Designer: F. W. Webb
- Builder: Crewe Works
- Serial number: 3102–3111
- Build date: March 1889 – June 1890
- Total produced: 10
Specifications
- Configuration
  - Whyte: 2-2-2-0
  - UIC: 1AA n3v
- Gauge: 4 ft 8 1/2 in (1,435 mm)
- Leading dia.: 3 ft 10 1/2 in (1.181 m) + tyres
- Driver dia.: 6 ft 10 in (2.083 m) + tyres
- Wheelbase
  - Engine: 18 ft 1 in (5.51 m)
  - Leading: 8 ft 5 in (2.57 m)
  - Drivers: 9 ft 8 in (2.95 m)
- Loco weight: 46 long tons (47 t)
- Boiler
  - Diameter: 4 ft 2 in (1.27 m)
  - Tube plates: 11 ft 0 in (3.35 m)
- Boiler pressure: 175 lbf/in^{2} (1.21 MPa)
- Heating surface: 1,401.5 sq ft (130.20 m^{2})
- Cylinders: Three: two HP (outside), one LP (inside)
- High-pressure cylinder: 14 in × 24 in (356 mm × 610 mm)
- Low-pressure cylinder: 30 in × 24 in (762 mm × 610 mm)
- Valve gear: Outside: Joy; Inside: Slip-eccentric
Career
- Operators: London and North Western Railway
- Scrapped: October 1905 – July 1907
- Disposition: All scrapped

The LNWR Teutonic class was a class of 10 passenger three-cylinder compound 2-2-2-0 locomotives designed by F. W. Webb for the London and North Western Railway, and manufactured by them in their Crewe Works between 1889 and 1890.

== Design ==
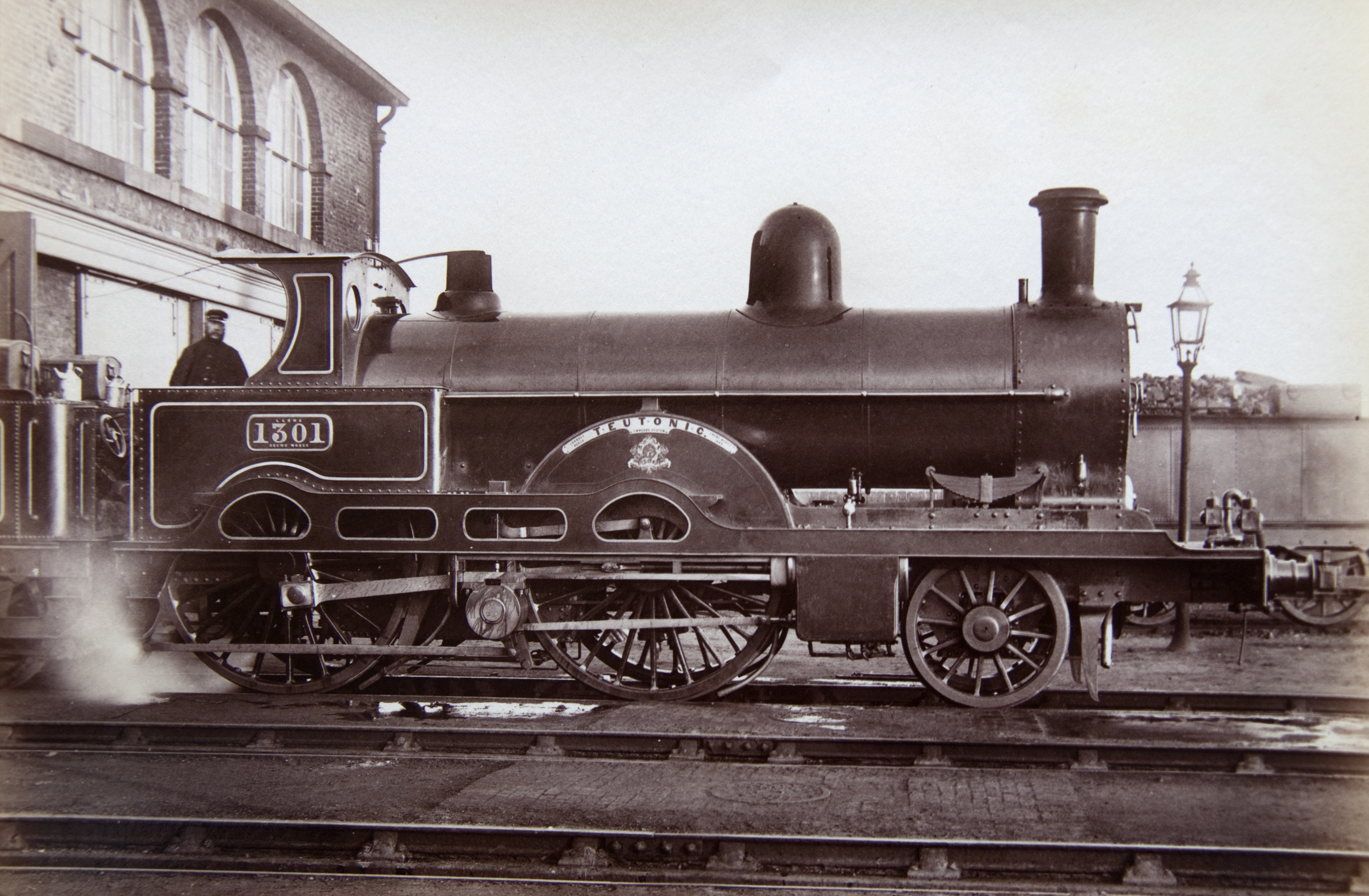
No. 1301 Teutonic in black livery

The design featured a boiler pressed to 175 lbf/in^{2} (1.21 MPa) delivering saturated steam to two outside 14-inch (356 mm) high-pressure cylinders, which exhausted to one 30-inch (762 mm) low-pressure cylinder inside the frames. All three cylinders had a stroke of 24 inches (610 mm); the high-pressure cylinders drove the rear wheels, while the low-pressure drove the leading driving wheels. As the two pairs of driving wheels were not connected, the locomotives were "duplex drive" or "double-singles".

They were a development of Webb's Dreadnought class; they had larger driving and leading wheels, and the additions of cylinder tail rods (which were later removed). There were also further modifications to the Joy valve gear, but the seven locomotives built in 1890 had the inside cylinder worked by slip-eccentric valve gear instead from new.

Of the ten locomotives, nine were named after ships of the White Star Line, the exception was named after a character in a Walter Scott novel, as it was exhibited at the Edinburgh International Exhibition of 1890.

== Decline ==
When George Whale become chief mechanical engineer of the LNWR in 1903, he started a programme of eliminating Webb's over-complicated duplex compound locomotives. Consequently, the class was scrapped between October 1905, and July 1907, having been replaced by Whale's Experiment class.

Table of locomotives
| LNWR No. | LNWR Name | Crewe Works No. | Date built | Date scrapped | Notes |
|---|---|---|---|---|---|
| 1301 | Teutonic | 3102 | Mar 1889 | Oct 1905 | |
| 1302 | Oceanic | 3103 | May 1889 | Jan 1907 | |
| 1303 | Pacific | 3104 | Jun 1889 | Jan 1907 | |
| 1304 | Jeanie Deans | 3105 | Mar 1890 | Sep 1906 | |
| 1305 | Doric | 3106 | May 1890 | Jun 1906 | |
| 1306 | Ionic | 3107 | Jun 1890 | Dec 1905 | |
| 1307 | Coptic | 3108 | Jun 1890 | Dec 1905 | |
| 1309 | Adriatic | 3109 | Jun 1890 | Jul 1907 | |
| 1311 | Celtic | 3110 | Jun 1890 | Jun 1906 | |
| 1312 | Gallic | 3111 | Jun 1890 | Jun 1906 | |
