= Pennsylvania Railroad no. 1320 =

Experimental Pennsylvania Railroad steam locomotive

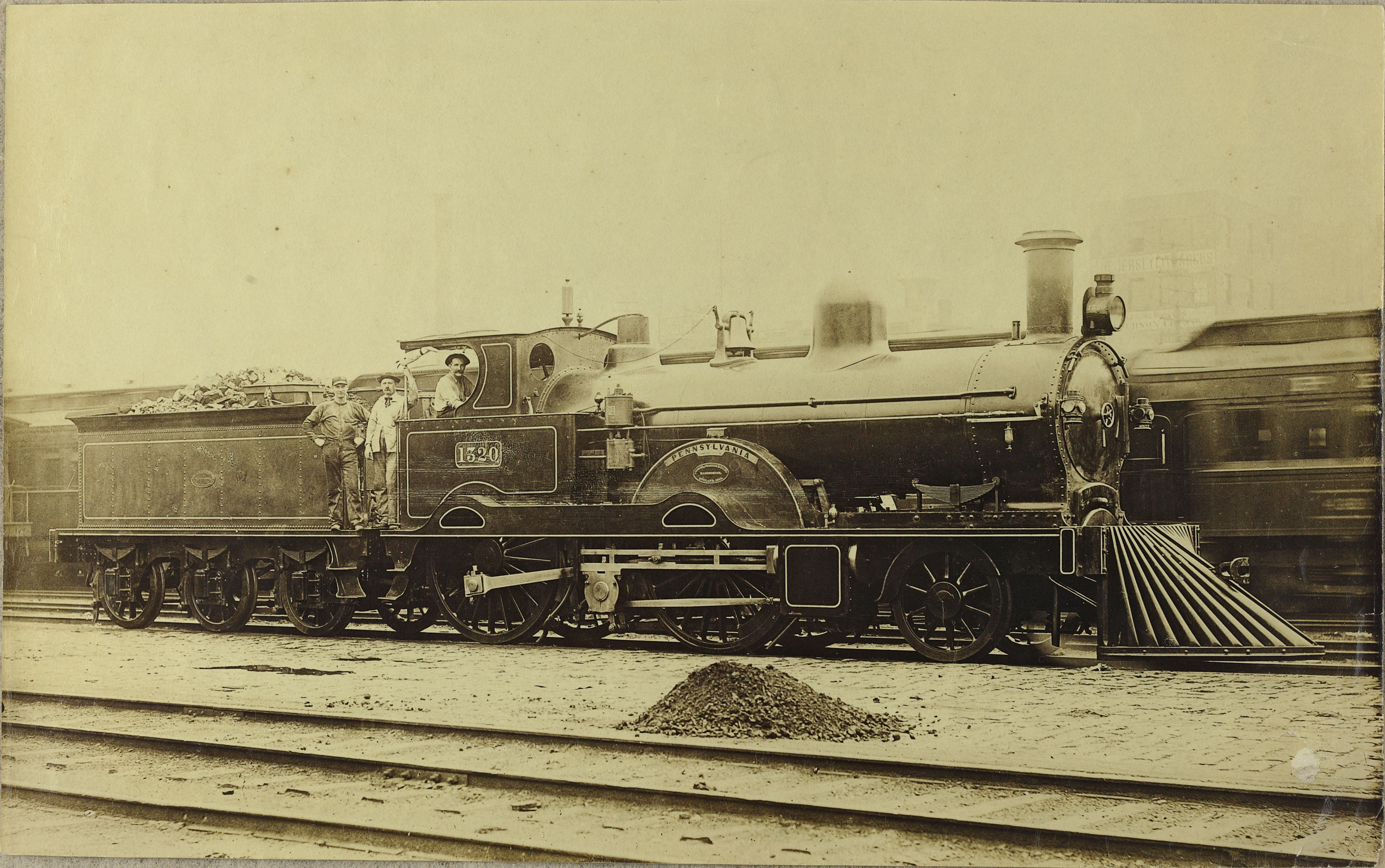
Type and origin
- Power type: Steam
- Designer: Francis Webb
- Builder: Beyer, Peacock & Company
- Build date: 1889
- Total produced: 1
Specifications
- Configuration
  - Whyte: 2-2-2-0
  - UIC: 1AA n3v
- Gauge: 4 ft 8 1/2 in (1,435 mm)
- Leading dia.: 3 ft 6 in (1.067 m) + tyres
- Driver dia.: 6 ft 0 in (1.829 m) + tyres
- Wheelbase
  - Engine: 18 ft 1 in (5.51 m)
  - Leading: 8 ft 5 in (2.57 m)
  - Drivers: 9 ft 8 in (2.95 m)
- Loco weight: 43 long tons (44 t)
- Boiler
  - Diameter: 4 ft 2 in (1.27 m)
  - Tube plates: 11 ft 0 in (3.35 m)
- Boiler pressure: 175 lbf/in^{2} (1.21 MPa)
- Heating surface: 1,401.5 sq ft (130.20 m^{2})
- Cylinders: Three: two HP (outside), one LP (inside)
- High-pressure cylinder: 14 in × 24 in (356 mm × 610 mm)
- Low-pressure cylinder: 30 in × 24 in (762 mm × 610 mm)
- Valve gear: Joy
Career
- Operators: Pennsylvania Railroad
- Numbers: 1320
- Official name: Pennsylvania
- Delivered: 1889
- Withdrawn: 1897
- Disposition: Scrapped in 1897

The Pennsylvania Railroad no. 1320 was a single experimental passenger three-cylinder compound 2-2-2-0 locomotive purchased by the Pennsylvania Railroad in 1889, based on the London and North Western Railway's (LNWR) Dreadnought class, designed by Francis Webb. As the railway's Crewe Works (which had built the Dreadnought classes) was not legally allowed to sell its locomotives, 1320 was instead constructed by Beyer, Peacock & Company in Manchester to the Dreadnought's specifications.

== Design ==
The design featured a boiler pressed to 175 lbf/in^{2} (1.21 MPa) delivering saturated steam to two outside 14-inch (356 mm) high-pressure cylinders, which exhausted to one 30-inch (762 mm) low-pressure cylinder inside the frames. All three cylinders had a stroke of 24 inches (610 mm); the high-pressure cylinders drove the rear wheels, while the low-pressure drove the leading driving wheels. As the two pairs of driving wheels were not connected, the locomotives were "duplex drive" or "double-singles".

The locomotive performed poorly for the PRR, being slow and weak compared to the line's other, domestically purchased locomotives, as well as unsuited to the rougher trackage common of U.S. railroads. The unique design of the cylinders made the locomotive difficult to operate and maintain, making it unpopular among the road's engineers and management staff. The locomotive was scrapped in 1897.
