= LNWR Experiment Class =

The London and North Western Railway (LNWR) had two classes of steam locomotive identified as Experiment Class:

- LNWR Webb Experiment Class of the 1880s, by Francis Webb
- LNWR Whale Experiment Class, 4-6-0 1905- by George Whale

Also, there was the Experiment Goods, LNWR 19in Express Goods Class of 1906
