= Divided drive (locomotive) =

A divided drive locomotive is a steam locomotive that uses different cylinders to power different pairs of driving wheels, either to better distribute weight and reduce "hammer blow" damage to the track or to add space between driving wheels for a larger firebox.

== Origins ==
=== Anatole Mallet ===
The system of dividing drive was originally developed by Anatole Mallet in the 1870s on a number of rigid-wheelbase compound locomotives, and then during the 1880s, on Mallet articulated locomotives.

=== Francis Webb ===
Mallet's ideas inspired Francis Webb in Britain who introduced 2-(2-2)-0, 2-(2-2)-2, 2-2-2-2T, 2-2-(4-0)T divided drive locomotives between 1882 and 1903.

=== Alfred de Glehn ===
Alfred de Glehn introduced a successful divided drive 2-(2-2)-0 compound based on Webb's ideas.

== Use in the United Kingdom ==
Dugald Drummond of the London and South Western Railway used divided drive (not very successfully) in his simple expansion T7 and E10 Classes of 4-2-2-0. In the latter two instances the divided drive was adopted to allow the driving wheels to be spaced more widely than normal without the need for long coupling rods. This enabled an extra-long firebox.

Divided drive could also be used on simple expansion locomotives with coupled driving wheels. The NER Class X (LNER Class T1) 4-8-0T shunting engines designed by Wilson Worsdell for the North Eastern Railway had three cylinders with divided drive. Similarly Richard Maunsell of the Southern Railway (Great Britain) designed the SR Lord Nelson class with divided drive between the front coupled axle for the inside cylinders and the middle coupled axle for the outside cylinders 'to give better weight distribution and reduced hammer blow'.

Sir Nigel Gresley of the London and North Eastern Railway (LNER) used divided drive on his B17 class 4-6-0 for hauling passenger services on the severely weight restricted Great Eastern Main Line. Gresley's successors Edward Thompson and Arthur Peppercorn both adopted divided drive on their larger designs as a consequence of their wish to overcome the maintenance problems associated with the Gresley conjugated valve gear.

== Use in the United States ==
The concept was further developed in the early 1930s in the United States by the Baldwin Locomotive Works, whose duplex locomotives divided the drive between two sets of outside cylinders.

== Sources ==
- Ahrons, E. L. (1927). The British Steam Railway Locomotive 1825-1925. Amen Corner, London: Locomotive Publishing Co.
- Bradley, D.L. (1975). Locomotives of the Southern Railway. Part 1. London: Railway Correspondence and Travel Society.
- Casserley, H.C. (1971). London and South Western locomotives. London: Ian Allan.
- Marshall, John (1978). A biographical dictionary of railway engineers. Newton Abbot: David and Charles.
