= LNWR 19in Express Goods Class =

LNWR 19-inch Goods
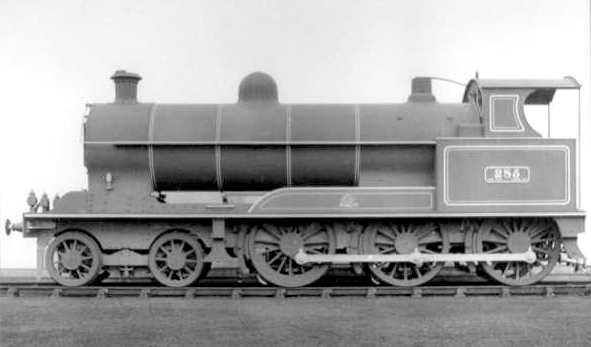
- No. 285 in photographic grey livery without tender
Type and origin
- Power type: Steam
- Designer: George Whale
- Builder: Crewe Works
- Serial number: 4600–19, 4640–59, 4690–4769, 4790–4819, 4870–89
- Build date: 1906–1909
- Total produced: 170
Specifications
- Configuration
  - Whyte: 4-6-0
  - UIC: 2′C n2
- Gauge: 4 ft 8 1/2 in (1,435 mm)
- Leading dia.: 3 ft 3 in (0.991 m)
- Driver dia.: 5 ft 2 1/2 in (1.588 m)
- Wheelbase: 26 ft 8 1/2 in (8.141 m)
- Axle load: 16 long tons (16.3 t)
- Adhesive weight: 44 long tons (44.7 t)
- Loco weight: 63 long tons (64 t)
- Tender weight: 37 long tons (37.6 t)
- Total weight: 100 long tons (101.6 t)
- Tender type: three axle
- Fuel type: Coal
- Fuel capacity: 6.6 long tons (6.7 t)
- Water cap.: 3,600 imp gal (16.4 m^{3})
- Firebox
  - Grate area: 25 sq ft (2.3 m^{2})
- Boiler pressure: 175 psi (1.21 MPa)
- Heating surface
  - Firebox: 144.3 sq ft (13.41 m^{2})
  - Tubes: 1,840.5 sq ft (170.99 m^{2})
  - Total surface: 1,984.8 sq ft (184.39 m^{2})
- Cylinders: Two
- Cylinder size: 19 in × 26 in (483 mm × 660 mm)
- Valve gear: Joy
- Valve type: Balanced slide valves
Career
- Operators: London and North Western Railway → London, Midland and Scottish Railway → British Railways
- Power class: LMS: 4F
- Nicknames: Experiment Goods
- Withdrawn: 1931–1950
- Disposition: All scrapped

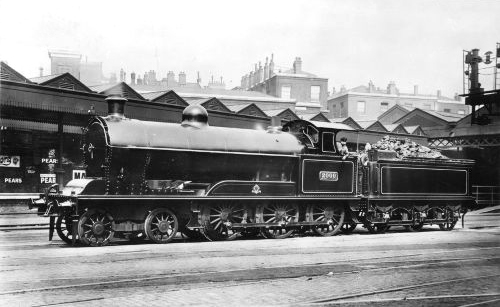
No. 2000 at Euston Station with tender

The London and North Western Railway (LNWR) 19in Express Goods Class, otherwise known as the Experiment Goods Class was a class of 4-6-0 steam locomotives. They were essentially a smaller wheeled version of the Whale's Experiment Class and were an early attempt at a mixed traffic engine.

== Career ==
The engine was developed under the direction of George Whale, the then Chief mechanical engineer of the LNWR. The goal was to create a powerful locomotive for express freight service that would also be suitable for passenger trains. Following the great success of the Precursor Class and the Experiment Class for passenger service, Whale designed a freight or mixed-traffic version of the Experiment Class in 1906, known as the 19in Express Goods.

Crewe built 170 engines between 1906 and 1909. The LNWR reused numbers from withdrawn locomotives, so the numbering was haphazard.

The locomotives were most useful engines and, in addition to their primary role in express freight service, were also employed on passenger excursion trains. On occasion, they served as pilot engines for heavy express services on the West Coast Main Line (WCML), particularly on the challenging section between Carlisle and Shap Summit.

All passed onto LMS ownership in 1923. The LMS gave them the power classification 4F. The LMS renumbered them into the more logical series 8700–8869. Withdrawals started in 1931. British Railways acquired three 8801/24/34 in 1948, but all were withdrawn by 1950 before they could receive their allocated numbers 48801/24/34. None were preserved.
