= 2-12-4T =

Tank locomotive wheel arrangement

In Whyte notation for the classification of steam locomotives by wheel arrangement, a 2-12-4 is a locomotive with one pair of unpowered leading wheels, followed by six pairs of powered driving wheels, and two pairs of unpowered trailing wheels. While it would be possible to make a tender locomotive of this type, all locomotives of this wheel arrangement were tank engines.

== Equivalent classifications ==
Other equivalent classifications are:

- UIC classification: 1′F2′ (also known as German classification and Italian classification)
- European classification: 1-6-2
- French classification: 162

== Bulgaria ==
There are only 20 standard gauge (1,435 mm (4 ft 8 1/2 in)) engines with this wheel arrangement that were built for and ran in Europe: class 46 of the Bulgarian State Railways (BDŽ). They were ordered by BDŽ and built according to its specification by two different manufacturers: 12 engines by H. Cegielski in Poznań, Poland in 1931, and 8 by Berliner Maschinenbau (Schwarzkopf) in Berlin, Germany in 1943. Although there is a major difference between the two batches—the first 12 engines are type 1′F2′ h2Gt — tank-engine for freight service, two-cylinder system with simple steam expansion (Zwilling) with superheating, while the remaining 8 are 1′F2′ h3Gt — 3-cylinder (Drilling)—all were put into the same class 46 and numbered 46.01 – 46.12 and 46.13 – 46.20.

They were designed to haul heavy coal trains on mountainous lines with gradients of about 2.67% (1 in 35.7) and more, and they coped with this hard task very well. Bulgarian railwaymen gave them nickname "Mother Bear" because they looked fat, clumsy and compact. These engines appear to be the most powerful steam locomotives in Europe. Two of them (46.03 two-cylinder and 46.13 three-cylinder) are preserved. The two-cylinder 46.03 has been restored to working order and ran in steam in May 2015.

== Technical specifications ==
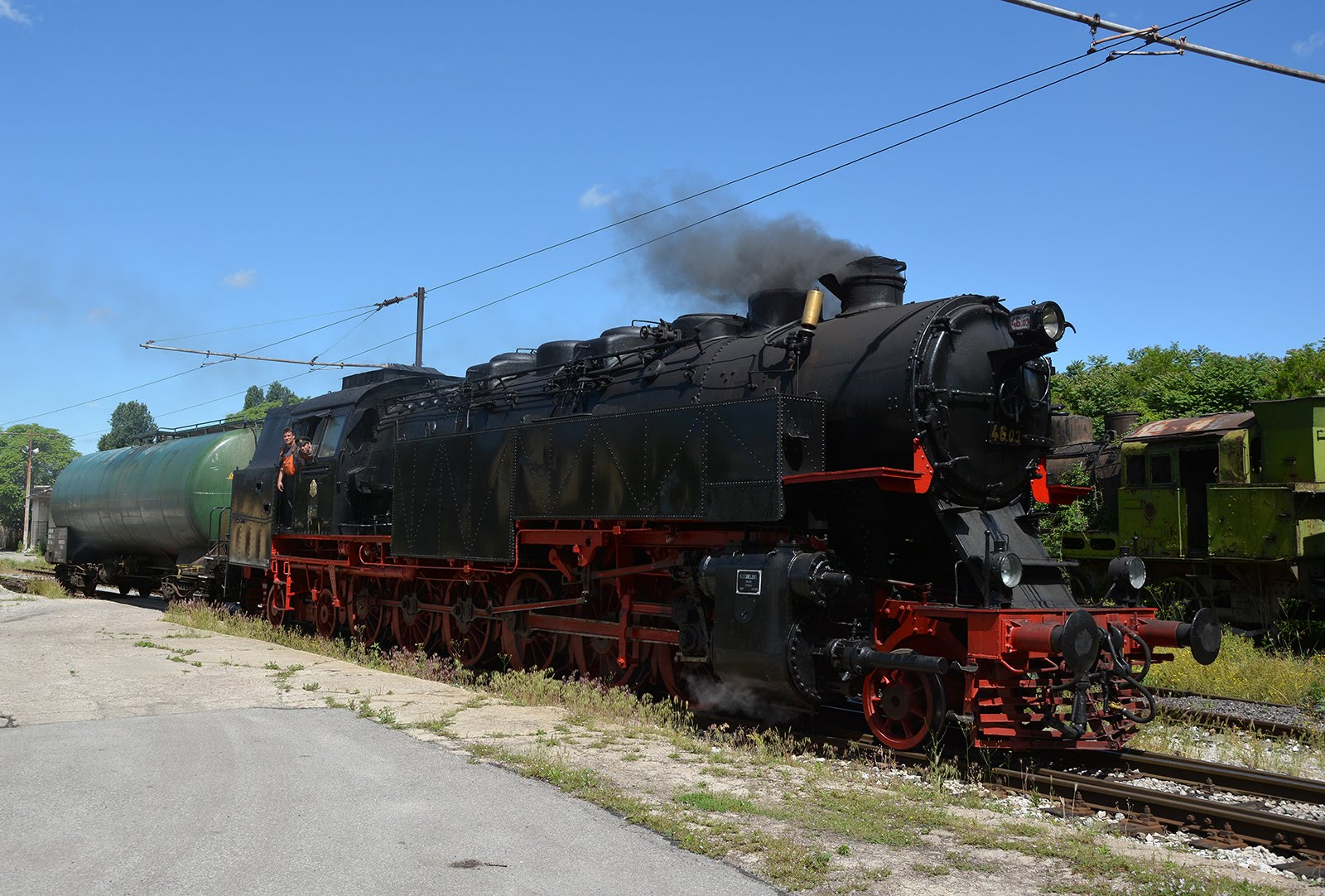
BDZ 46.03, load test on 26th May 2015 (By Ivo Radoev).

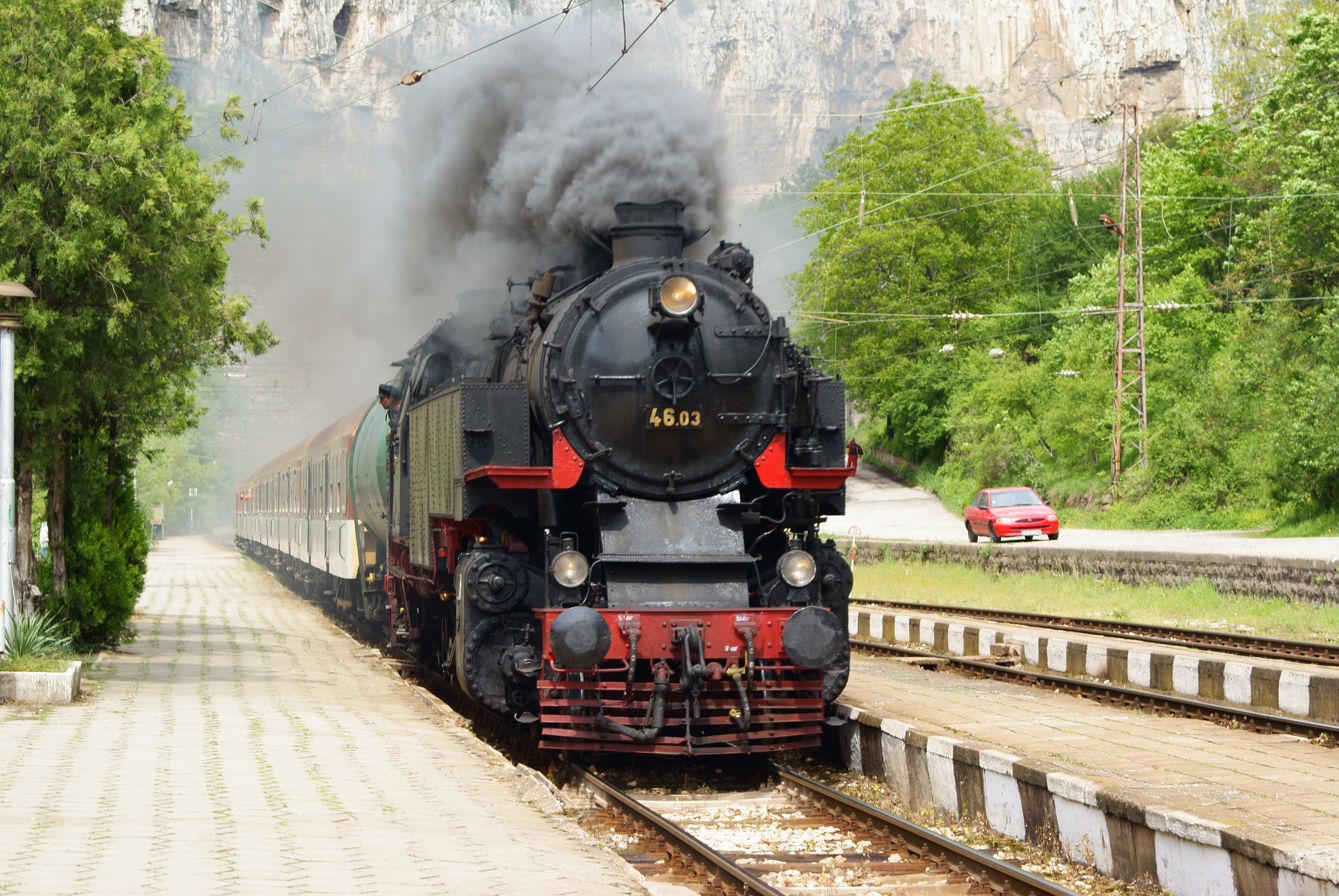
BDZ 46.03 at Lakatnik railway station, 24th April 2016.

Locomotive No.	46.01 – 46.12	46.13 – 46.20
Gauge, mm	1,435	1,435
Type (UIC)	1′F2′ h2Gt	1′F2′ h3Gt
Type (BDŽ)	Тт 1-6-2_{17}	Тт 1-6-2_{18}
Builder	Cegielski	Berliner Maschinenbau
Year	1931	1943
Steam pressure, kg/cm^{2}	16	16
Superheater area, m^{2}	83.91	80
Heating area, m^{2}	224.07	223.6
Grate area, m^{2}	4.87	4.87
Cylinders no. × dia. × stroke, mm	2 × 700 × 700	3 × 550 × 650
Driving wheels diameter, mm	1,340	1,340
Axleload, t	17	18
Adhesive weight, t	101.7	108
Total weight, t	149.1	155.8
Coal, t	10	10
Water, m^{3}	18	18
Total length, m	18.205	18.155
Total height, m	4.28	4.345
Tractive effort, starting, kN	381	360
Tractive effort @ 20 km/h, kN	307.2	264.1
Max speed, km/h	65	65
