= 4-6-6 =

Steam locomotive wheel arrangement

In the Whyte notation for describing steam locomotive wheel arrangement, a 4-6-6 is a locomotive with a four-wheeled leading truck, six driving wheels, and a six-wheeled trailing truck. All the locomotives produced of this arrangement have been tank locomotives, and the vast majority in the United States. It was a popular arrangement for the larger Mason Bogies , as well as some of the largest suburban tank locomotives.

The locomotive was mostly used in the Boston and Albany Railroad.

== Equivalent classifications ==
edit Other equivalent classifications are:

- UIC classification: 2’C3’ (also known as German classification and Italian classification)
- French classification: 233
- Turkish classification: 38
- Swiss classification: 3/8
