= 2-2-4-0T =

Duplex locomotive wheel arrangement

Under the Whyte notation for the classification of steam locomotives, 2-2-4-0T represents the wheel arrangement of two leading wheels on one axle, two driving wheels powered from the inside cylinders, four coupled driving wheels powered from the outside cylinders but no trailing wheels.

== Usage ==
This unusual wheel arrangement appears only ever to have been used on one divided drive compound tank locomotive designed by Francis Webb of the London and North Western Railway, No. 777. The locomotive was nicknamed “Cold Dinners” which suggests that it was not successful. It was withdrawn in 1901.

Webb's 2-2-4-0T locomotive, LNWR Nº 2974

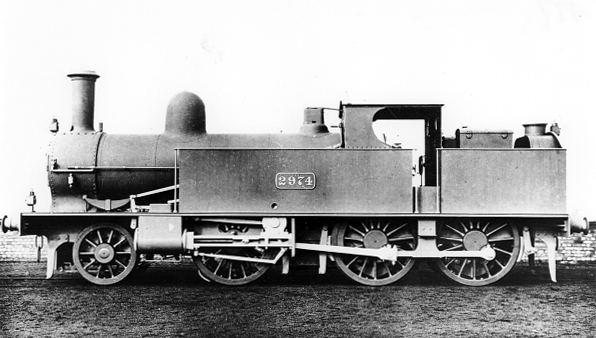

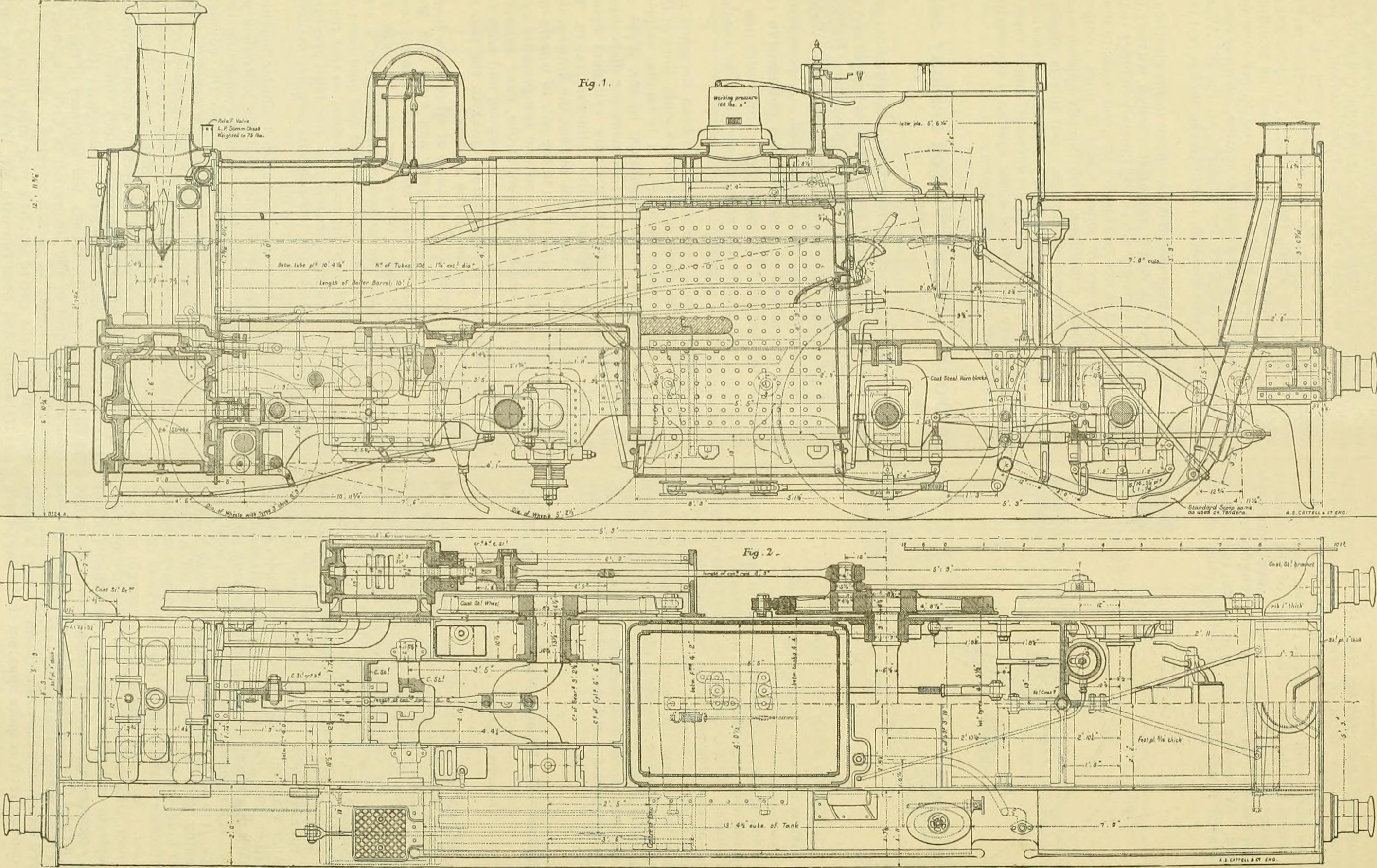
Sectioned

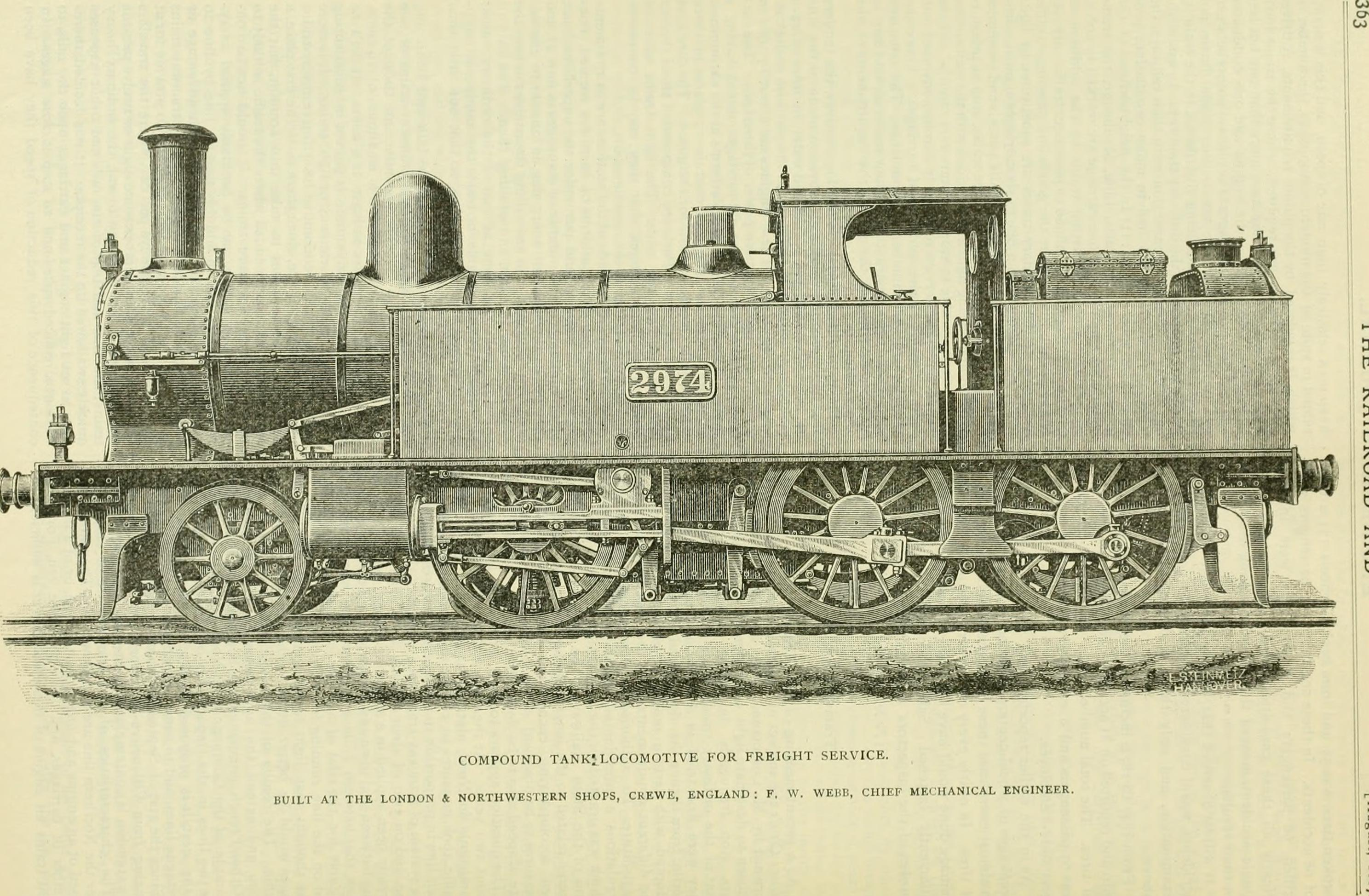
