= 2-2-2-0 =

Locomotive wheel arrangement

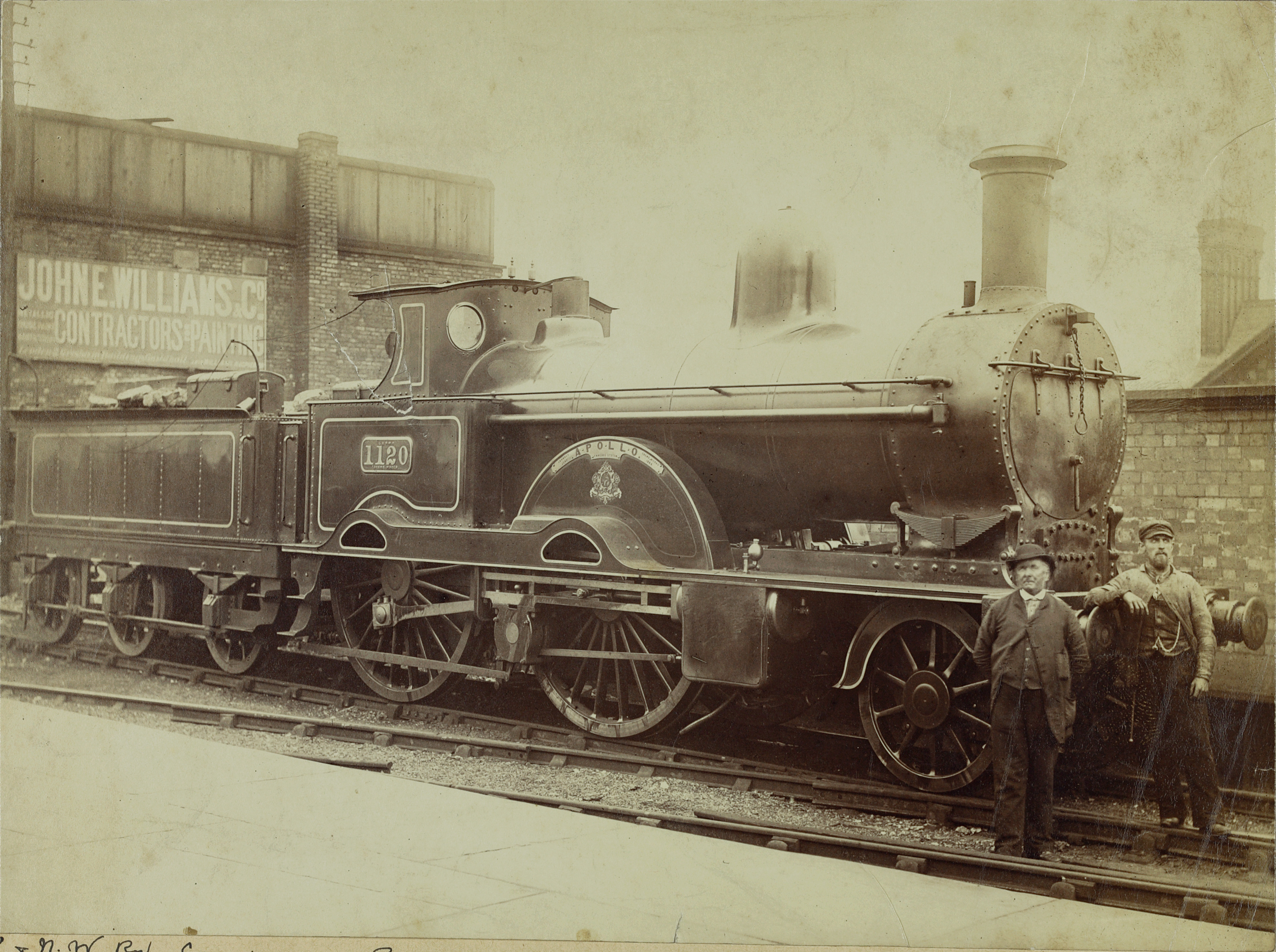
LNWR Webb Experiment class 1120 Apollo: one carrying axle and two driving axles

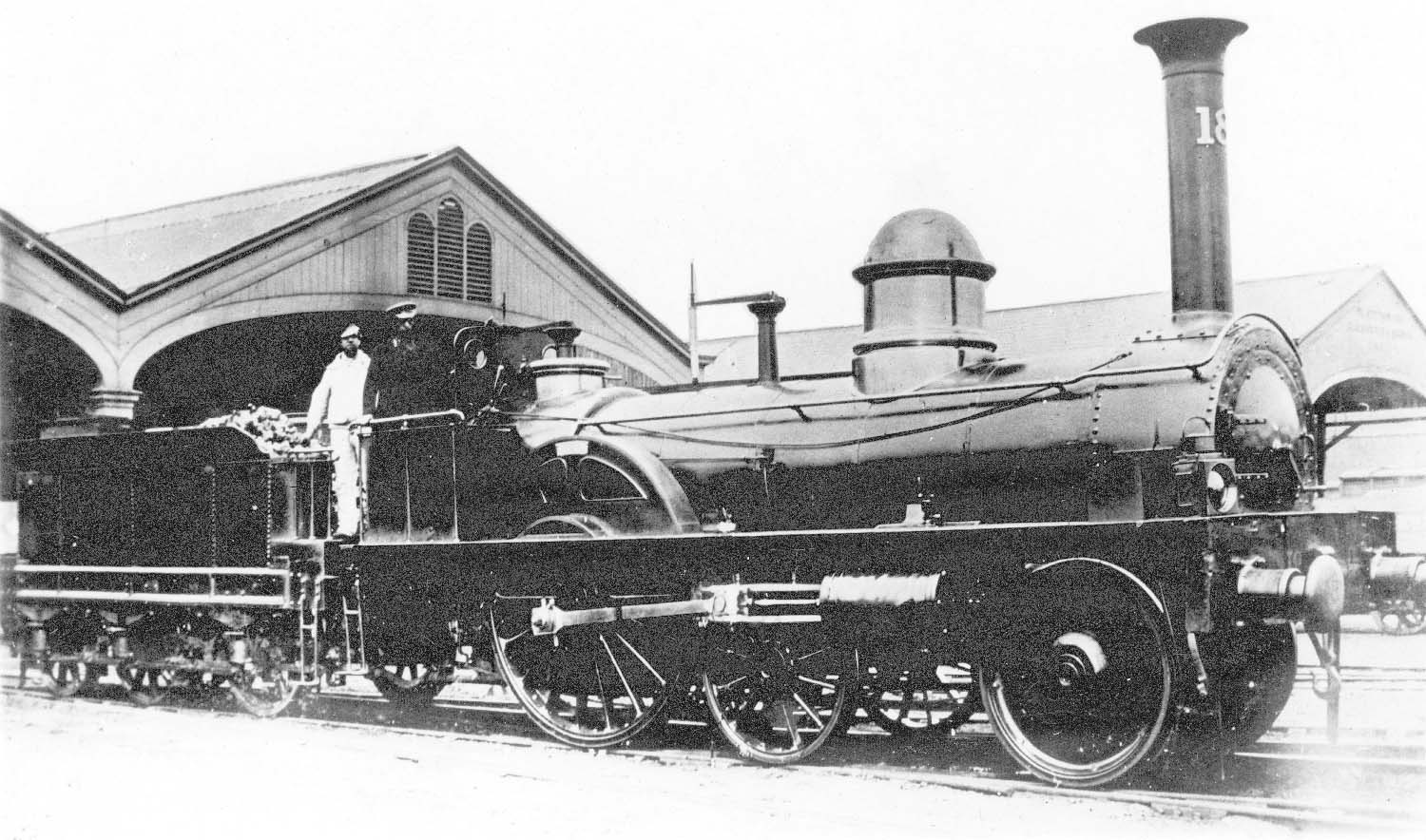
LNWR 2+2-2-0 No 189 at Curzon Street, Birmingham, circa 1859: two carrying axles, one driving axle

Under the Whyte notation for the classification of steam locomotives, 2-2-2-0 usually represents the wheel arrangement of two leading wheels on one axle, four powered but uncoupled driving wheels on two axles, and no trailing wheels, but can also be used to represent two sets of leading wheels (not in a bogie) two driving wheels, and no trailing wheels. Some authorities place brackets around the duplicated but uncoupled wheels, creating a notation 2-(2-2)-0, or (2-2)-2-0, as a means of differentiating between them. Others simply refer to the locomotives 2-2-2-0.

== Usage ==
The 2-2-2-0 wheel arrangement was first used on some locomotives introduced on the Eastern Counties Railway by John Chester Craven between 1845 and 1847, and some Crampton locomotives on the South Eastern Railway in 1849. However the 2-2-2-0 type is usually associated with Francis Webb of the London and North Western Railway who between 1882 and 1890 introduced a number of compound locomotive classes including the LNWR Webb Experiment Class, LNWR Dreadnought Class and LNWR Teutonic Class. The locomotives were never reliable and Webb's successor George Whale withdrew them all within three years of taking up office in 1903. The Pennsylvania Railroad had one engine based on the LNWR compounds which proved to be underpowered and was scrapped in 1897. The type was used with more success on French railways with a 4-cylinder compound locomotive designed by Alfred de Glehn, of the Société Alsacienne de Constructions Mécaniques (SACM) in 1885. One later example was of the 4-2-2-0 configuration but it was eventually rebuilt as a 4-4-0 instead.
