= LNWR Webb Experiment Class =

LNWR Experiment Class (Webb)
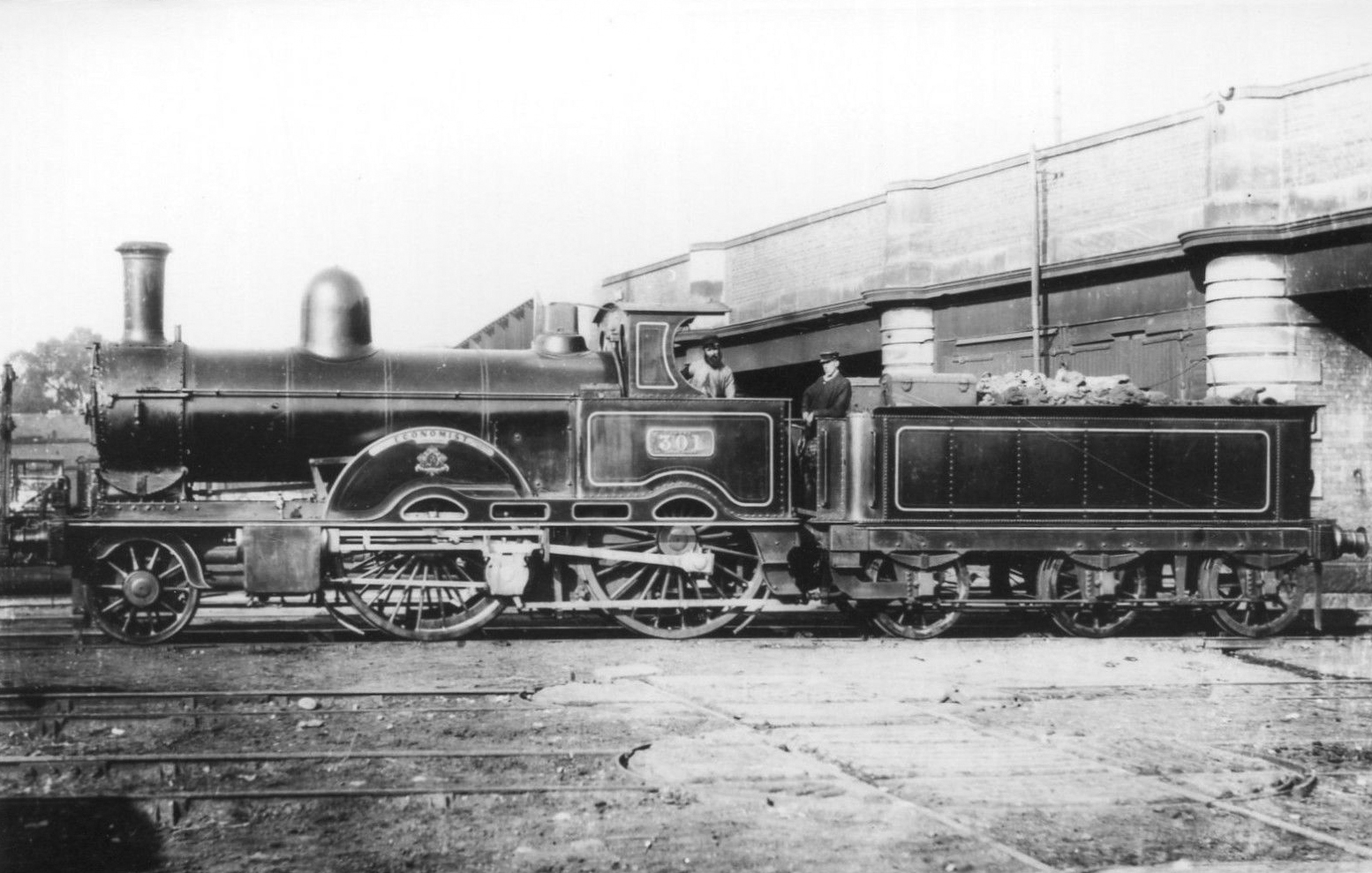
- No.301 Economist
Type and origin
- Power type: Steam
- Designer: F. W. Webb
- Builder: Crewe Works
- Serial number: 2500, 2625–2628, 2669–2673, 2734–2753
- Build date: 1882–84
- Total produced: 30
Specifications
- Configuration
  - Whyte: 2-(2-2)-0
  - UIC: 1AA n3v
- Gauge: 4 ft 8 1/2 in (1,435 mm)
- Leading dia.: 3 ft 6 in (1.067 m)
- Driver dia.: 6 ft 6 in (1.981 m)
- Loco weight: 38 long tons (39 t)
- Fuel type: Coal
- Heating surface: 1,083.5 sq ft (100.66 m^{2})
- Cylinders: Three: two high pressure outside, driving rear wheels; one low pressure inside, driving front drivers
- High-pressure cylinder: 13 in × 24 in (330 mm × 610 mm)
- Low-pressure cylinder: 26 in × 24 in (660 mm × 610 mm)
- Valve gear: Joy valve gear for HP, and slip-eccentric valve gear for LP.
Career
- Operators: London and North Western Railway
- Withdrawn: 1903–1904
- Scrapped: 1904–1905
- Disposition: All scrapped

The London and North Western Railway Experiment Class was a series of 30 three-cylinder 2-(2-2)-0 compound locomotives designed by Francis Webb for the London and North Western Railway between 1882 and 1884. They were Webb’s first large-scale experiment with a class of express compound locomotives, and the first engine was named accordingly. They were followed by a class of similar, but larger locomotives, that featured larger boilers and smaller driving wheels – the LNWR Dreadnought Class.

After Webb's retirement, his successor, George Whale, withdrew the Experiment class locomotives soon after he took up office in 1903.

== Accidents and incidents ==
- On 22 December 1894, a gust of wind blew a wagon into a rake of wagons at Chelford, Cheshire. They were derailed and fouled the main line. Locomotive No. 520 Express was one of two hauling an express passenger train that collided with the wagons and was derailed. 14 people were killed and 48 were injured.

== Locomotives ==
Table of locomotives
LNWR No.	Name	Crewe Works No.	Date built	Date scrapped	Notes
66	Experiment	2500	January 1882	February 1905	
300	Compound	2625	February 1883	July 1905	
301	Economist	2626	March 1883	October 1904	
302	Velocipede	2627	April 1883	July 1905	
303	Hydra	2628	April 1883	January 1905	
305	Trentham	2669	July 1883	June 1904	
306	Knowsley	2670	July 1883	July 1905	
307	Victor	2671	July 1883	February 1905	
520	Express	2672	July 1883	April 1905	
519	Shooting Star	2673	July 1883	February 1905	
311	Richard Francis Roberts	2734	January 1884	July 1905	
315	Alaska	2735	February 1884	July 1905	
321	Servia	2736	February 1884	January 1905	
323	Britannic	2737	February 1884	March 1905	
333	Germanic	2738	February 1884	November 1904	
353	Oregon	2739	February 1884	July 1905	
363	Aurania	2740	February 1884	February 1905	
365	America	2741	March 1884	April 1905	
366	City of Chicago	2742	March 1884	May 1905	
310	Sarmatian	2743	March 1884	November 1904	
1102	Cyclops	2744	May 1884	October 1904	
1120	Apollo	2745	June 1884	December 1905	
1104	Sunbeam	2746	June 1884	January 1905	
1113	Hecate	2747	June 1884	August 1904	
1111	Messenger	2748	June 1884	February 1905	
1115	Snake	2749	July 1884	March 1905	
1116	Friar	2750	July 1884	August 1905	
1117	Penguin	2751	July 1884	October 1904	
372	Empress	2752	July 1884	June 1905	
374	Emperor	2753	July 1884	September 1905	
