= Triplex locomotive =

Articulated steam locomotive with three sets of driving wheels

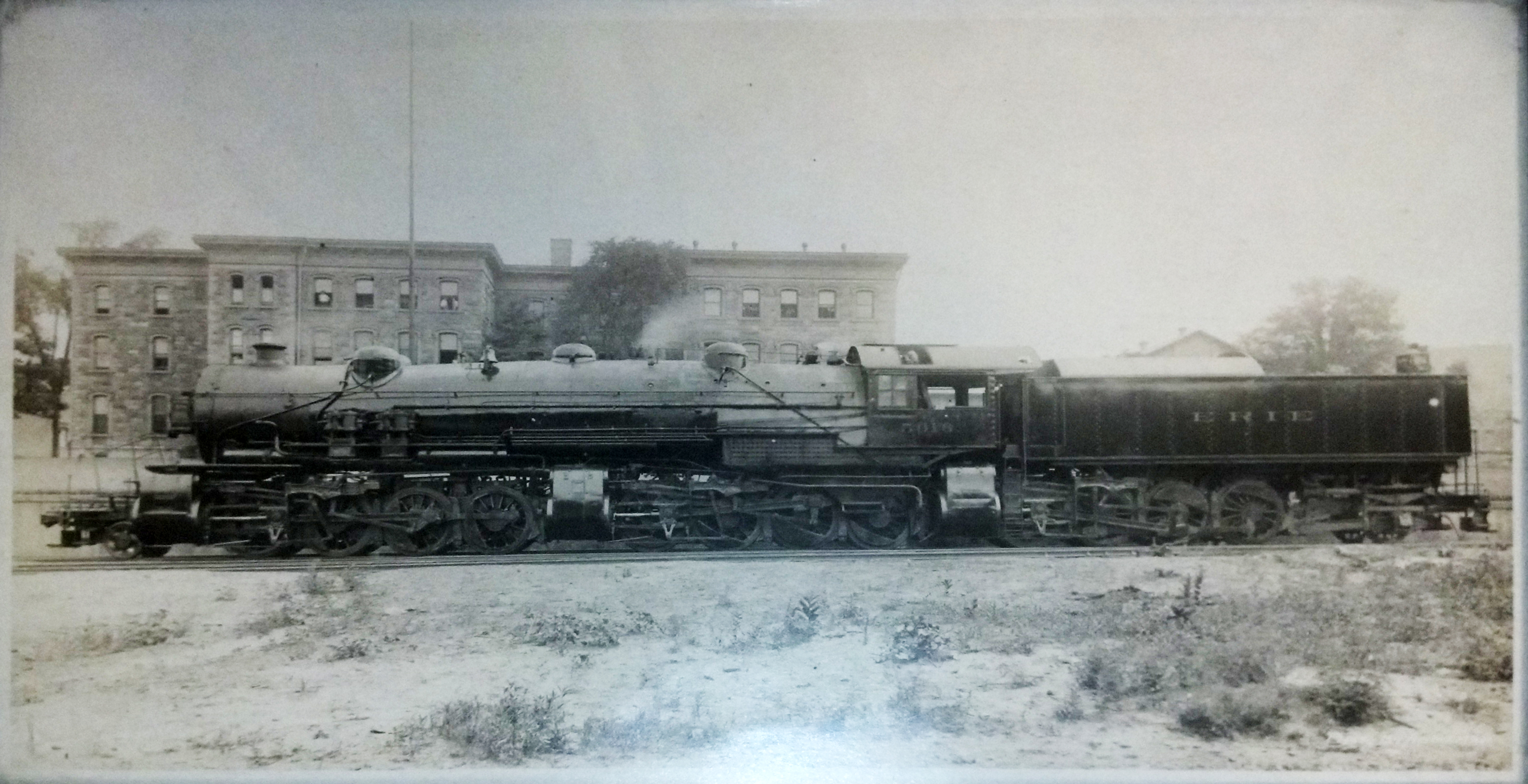
Baldwin Erie P1 5016 Triplex, an Erie Class P-1 locomotive, shown in Exeter, Pennsylvania

A triplex locomotive was a steam locomotive class that divided the driving force on its wheels by using three pairs of cylinders to drive three sets of driving wheels. Any such locomotive will inevitably be articulated. All triplex locomotives built were of the Mallet type, with an extra set of driving wheels under the tender.

The concept was extended to locomotives with four, five or six sets of drive wheels, but only one was built: a quadruplex locomotive in Belgium.

== Erie and Virginian Triplex classes ==
Erie Railroad Class P-1
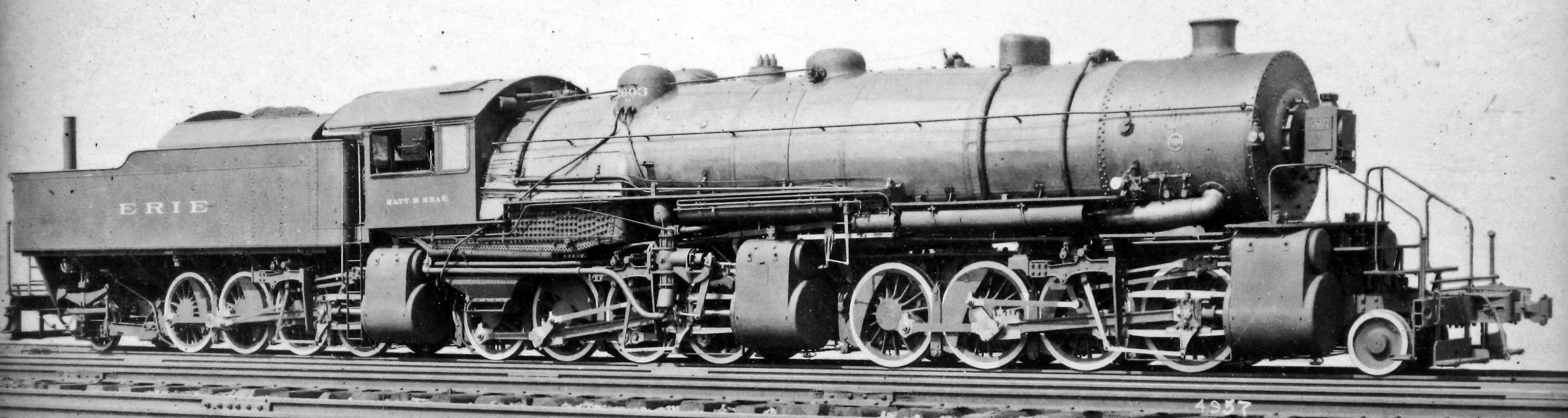
- The first Erie Class P-1, named Matt H. Shay
Type and origin
- Power type: Steam
- Builder: Baldwin Locomotive Works
- Build date: 1914–1916
- Total produced: 3
Specifications
- Configuration
  - Whyte: 2-8-8-8-2
Career
- Numbers: Erie Railroad; 5014–5016
- Retired: 1929–1933
- Disposition: All three triplex locomotives scrapped by 1933

Virginian Railway Class XA
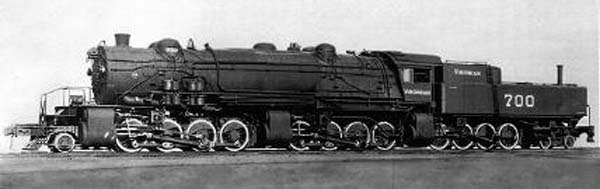
- The only Class XA 2-8-8-8-4 triplex locomotive ever built, number 700, for the Virginian Railway, in 1916 during World War I
Type and origin
- Power type: Steam
- Builder: Baldwin Locomotive Works
- Build date: 1916
- Total produced: 1
- Rebuilder: Virginian Railway and Baldwin Locomotive Works
- Rebuild date: 1920
- Number rebuilt: 1
Specifications
- Configuration
  - Whyte: 2-8-8-8-4
Career
- Operators: Virginian Railroad
- Numbers: Virginian Railway; 700
- Retired: 1920 (rebuilt) 1953 (railroad service)
- Scrapped: 1953
- Disposition: Rebuilt as two different steam locomotives; Virginian Railway Class AF 2-8-8-0 Mallet and Virginian Railway Class MD 2-8-2; both locomotives scrapped

Baldwin Locomotive Works built three 2-8-8-8-2 triplex locomotives for the Erie Railroad between 1914 and 1916 during World War I. A 2-8-8-8-2 has two leading wheels, three sets of eight driving wheels, and two trailing wheels. Because of its length, such a locomotive must be articulated. It is not longer than a normal articulated; the third set of drivers is located under the tender. All of the examples produced were a Triplex of the Mallet type. The first was named Matt H. Shay, after a beloved employee of that road. These Triplexes were given the classification of P-1 and they could reportedly pull 650 freight cars. The triplexes were primarily used as pushers on grades requiring helper locomotives. Slow moving, the triplexes were not considered successful and no more were built for Erie. The Erie scrapped their triplexes in 1929, 1931, and 1933.

Other equivalent classifications are:

UIC classification: (1'D)D(D1')
AAR classification: 1-D-D-D-1
French classification: 140+040+041
Turkish classification: 45+44+45
Swiss classification: 4/5+4/4+4/5

Another very similar designed triplex was built by Baldwin as a 2-8-8-8-4 for the Virginian Railway, as No. 700, in 1916. This triplex was given classification of XA, so named due to the experimental nature of the locomotive. The 2-8-8-8-4 was considered unsuccessful because it only made a maximum speed of 4.8–8.0 km/h (3–5 mph) and had high maintenance costs. The XA was sent back to Baldwin Locomotive Works where it was taken apart in 1920 and converted into a 2-8-8-0 and a 2-8-2. These two engines were in service until 1953. Both of the two engines were scrapped when diesel locomotives were cheaper to operate after World War II.

A 2-6-6-8-2 triplex design by ALCO was proposed to the Chesapeake & Ohio but was never built.

== Design ==
The triplex locomotives were of the Mallet type, but with an extra set of driving wheels under the tender. The centre set of cylinders received high-pressure steam. The exhaust from these was fed to the two other sets of cylinders. The right cylinder exhausted into the front set of low pressure cylinders, and the left into the rear set; this is also why the high pressure cylinders are the same diameter as the low pressure cylinders, making the engine a 2 to 1 compound, whereas most Mallet locomotives have much smaller high pressure cylinders. The front set exhausted through the smokebox and the rear set exhausted first through a feedwater heater in the tender and then through a large pipe directly to the outside, as can be seen in the photo. As only half of the exhaust steam went through the blast pipe in the smokebox, the draft in the firebox and the heating of the boiler was poor. Although the boiler was large in comparison with contemporary two-cylinder and four-cylinder locomotives, six large cylinders required more steam than even such a boiler could supply.

The Erie locomotives always operated in compound mode and did not have "intercepting" valves that would have put full pressure on all six cylinders, yet the triplexes produced huge amounts of tractive effort that may have been the highest of any steam locomotives ever. Westing gives a figure of 160,000 lbf (710 kN) in compound mode and seems to indicate that it was the largest tractive effort for any locomotives up to the mid-1910s. The Union Pacific Big Boys built in the 1940s during World War 2 did not exceed the Erie locomotives either, having only 135,375 lbf (602.18 kN).

The triplexes could also be considered the largest tank locomotives ever built, as the tender also had driving wheels and thus contributed to the traction.

The problem of diminishing adhesion of the tender unit as water and coal was used; was not a significant factor or design flaw, as the rear engine, as designed, was not to produce as much adhesion as the front and middle engines by adjusting the steam lap; which compensated for the usage of coal and water. Even nearly empty, the rear engine produced equivalent amounts of tractive effort.

Also, pusher locomotives had frequent opportunities to take on additional fuel and water as they were not "line haul" assignments. Coaling facilities were close at Susquehanna, and Port Jervis.

== Usage ==
In all, only four triplex locomotives were built, and only in the United States. Because the tractive effort of the locomotives was so great that the couplings and frames of the cars could not withstand it, the triplex locomotives could only be used to bank heavy trains up steep grades. Even with their huge boilers, the Erie locomotives could only produce enough steam to run at 16 km/h (10 mph), the Virginian only 8.0 km/h (5 mph). The reason for this was the poor performance of the boilers due to the lack of exhaust draught from the driving wheelset under the tender.

The Erie locomotives were used as helpers on the Susquehanna Hill also known as the Gulf Summit, near Deposit, New York, on the Southern Tier Line. After 13 years they were replaced by 2-10-2s and retired. All Erie triplex locomotives had been scrapped by 1930, and none have survived.

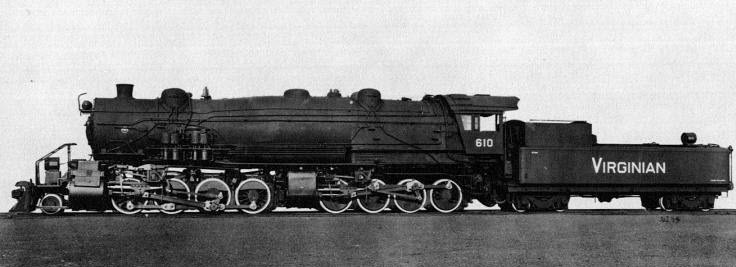
Virginian Railway Class AF

The Virginian XA #700 2-8-8-8-4 was unsuccessful. It was returned to Baldwin, where it was rebuilt into a Class MD 2-8-2, numbered 410, and a Class AF 2-8-8-0, numbered 610. A two-wheel trailing truck was later added, making it into a 2-8-8-2. These two locomotives were operated until 1953.

== Patent ==
- US 1629369 "Triple-expansion mallet locomotive." by Samuel M. Vauclain assigned to the Baldwin Locomotive Works filed on November 25, 1925
