= LNWR Dreadnought Class =

Class of British 2-2-2-0 locomotives

LNWR Dreadnought class
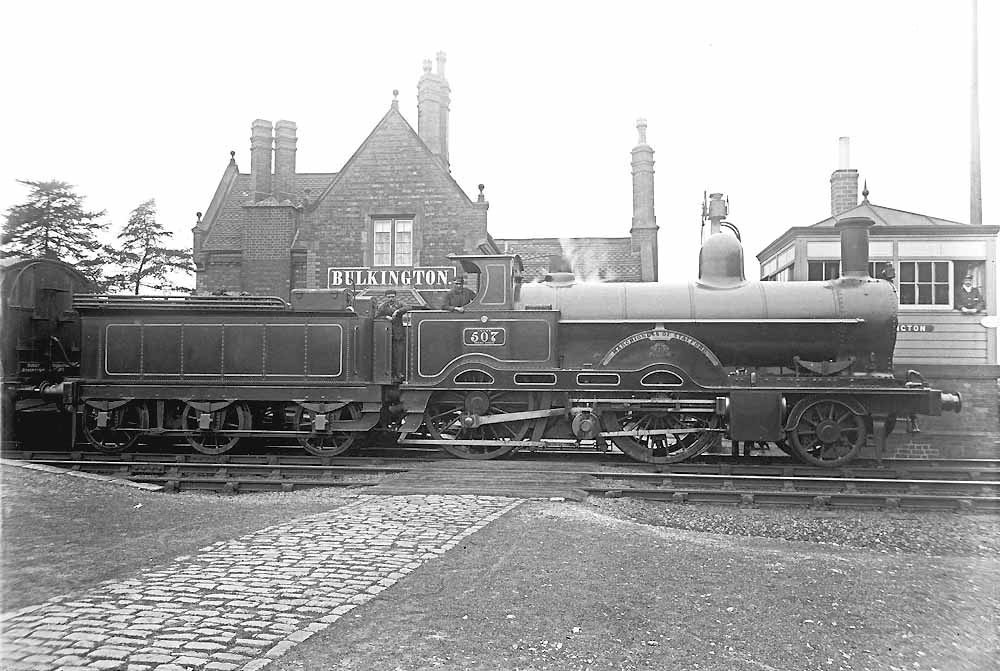
- No. 507 Marchioness of Stafford
Type and origin
- Power type: Steam
- Designer: Francis Webb
- Builder: Crewe Works
- Serial number: 2975–2804, 2886–2905, 3012–3021
- Build date: 1884–1888
- Total produced: 40
Specifications
- Configuration
  - Whyte: 2-2-2-0
  - UIC: 1AA n3v
- Gauge: 4 ft 8 1/2 in (1,435 mm)
- Leading dia.: 3 ft 6 in (1.067 m) + tyres
- Driver dia.: 6 ft 0 in (1.829 m) + tyres
- Wheelbase
  - Engine: 18 ft 1 in (5.51 m)
  - Leading: 8 ft 5 in (2.57 m)
  - Drivers: 9 ft 8 in (2.95 m)
- Loco weight: 43 long tons (44 t)
- Boiler
  - Diameter: 4 ft 2 in (1.27 m)
  - Tube plates: 11 ft 0 in (3.35 m)
- Boiler pressure: 175 lbf/in^{2} (1.21 MPa)
- Heating surface: 1,401.5 sq ft (130.20 m^{2})
- Cylinders: Three: two HP (outside), one LP (inside)
- High-pressure cylinder: 14 in × 24 in (356 mm × 610 mm)
- Low-pressure cylinder: 30 in × 24 in (762 mm × 610 mm)
- Valve gear: Joy, Slip-eccentric.
Career
- Operators: London and North Western Railway
- Scrapped: December 1903 – July 1905
- Disposition: All scrapped

The LNWR Dreadnought class was a class of 40 passenger three-cylinder compound 2-2-2-0 locomotives designed by F. W. Webb for the London and North Western Railway, and manufactured by them in their Crewe Works between 1884 and 1888. The railway also commissioned the Beyer, Peacock and Company to construct an additional locomotive of the design for the Pennsylvania Railroad.

== Design ==
The design featured a boiler pressed to 175 lbf/in^{2} (1.21 MPa) delivering saturated steam to two outside 14-inch (356 mm) high-pressure cylinders, which exhausted to one 30-inch (762 mm) low-pressure cylinder inside the frames. All three cylinders had a stroke of 24 inches (610 mm); the high-pressure cylinders drove the rear wheels, while the low-pressure drove the leading driving wheels. As the two pairs of driving wheels were not connected, the locomotives were "duplex drive" or "double-singles".

They were a development of Webb's Experiment class; they had larger boilers and smaller driving wheels, and while the Joy valve gear for the HP and LP cylinders could still be independently adjusted, it was now also possible to reverse both sets simultaneously. The inside valve gear was subsequently amended to the loose or slip-eccentric system, thus giving automatic reversal.

== Decline ==
When George Whale become chief mechanical engineer of the LNWR in 1903, he started a programme of eliminating Webb's over-complicated duplex compound locomotives. Consequently, the class was scrapped between December 1903, and July 1905, having been replaced by Whale's Experiment class.

Table of locomotives
LNWR No.	LNWR Name	Crewe Works No.	Date built	Date scrapped	Notes
503	Dreadnought	2795	Sep 1884	Apr 1904	
508	Titan	2796	Oct 1884	Feb 1904	
504	Thunderer	2797	Feb 1885	Aug 1904	
507	Marchioness of Stafford	2798	Mar 1885	Jul 1905	
509	Ajax	2799	Mar 1885	Apr 1904	
510	Leviathan	2800	Apr 1885	May 1904	
511	Achilles	2801	May 1885	Aug 1904	
513	Mammoth	2802	May 1885	Mar 1904	
515	Niagara	2803	May 1885	Nov 1904	
685	Himalaya	2804	May 1885	Sep 1904	
2055	Dunrobin	2886	Dec 1885	Jan 1905	
2056	Argus	2887	Dec 1885	Apr 1904	
2057	Euphrates	2888	Dec 1885	Jul 1904	
2058	Medusa	2889	Dec 1885	Feb 1905	
2059	Greyhound	2890	Dec 1885	Feb 1905	
2060	Vandal	2891	Dec 1885	Jul 1904	
2061	Harpy	2892	Dec 1885	Apr 1905	
2062	Herald	2893	Dec 1885	Jul 1905	
2063	Huskisson	2894	Dec 1885	Sep 1904	
2064	Autocrat	2895	Dec 1885	Mar 1905	
173	City of Manchester	2896	Mar 1886	Aug 1904	
2	City of Carlisle	2897	Mar 1886	Jun 1904	
1539	City of Chester	2898	Jun 1886	Jul 1904	Renumbered 437 in November 1886
410	City of Liverpool	2899	Jun 1886	Apr 1904	
1353	City of Edinburgh	2900	Jun 1886	Jul 1904	
1370	City of Glasgow	2901	Jun 1886	Jan 1904	
1395	Archimedes	2902	Jun 1886	Mar 1904	
1379	Stork	2903	Jun 1886	Feb 1905	
545	Tamerlane	2904	Jul 1886	Dec 1903	
659	Rowland Hill	2905	Jul 1886	May 1904	
637	City of New York	3012	Mar 1888	Aug 1904	
638	City of Paris	3013	Apr 1888	Nov 1904	
639	City of London	3014	May 1888	Oct 1904	
640	City of Dublin	3015	May 1888	Jan 1904	
641	City of Lichfield	3016	May 1888	Feb 1904	
643	Raven	3017	May 1888	Oct 1904	
644	Vesuvius	3018	Jun 1888	Jul 1904	
645	Alchymist	3019	Jun 1888	Jan 1905	
647	Ambassador	3020	Jun 1888	Apr 1904	
648	Swiftsure	3021	Jun 1888	Oct 1904	
