= LSWR T7 class =

Class of British steam locomotives

LSWR/SR T7 and E10
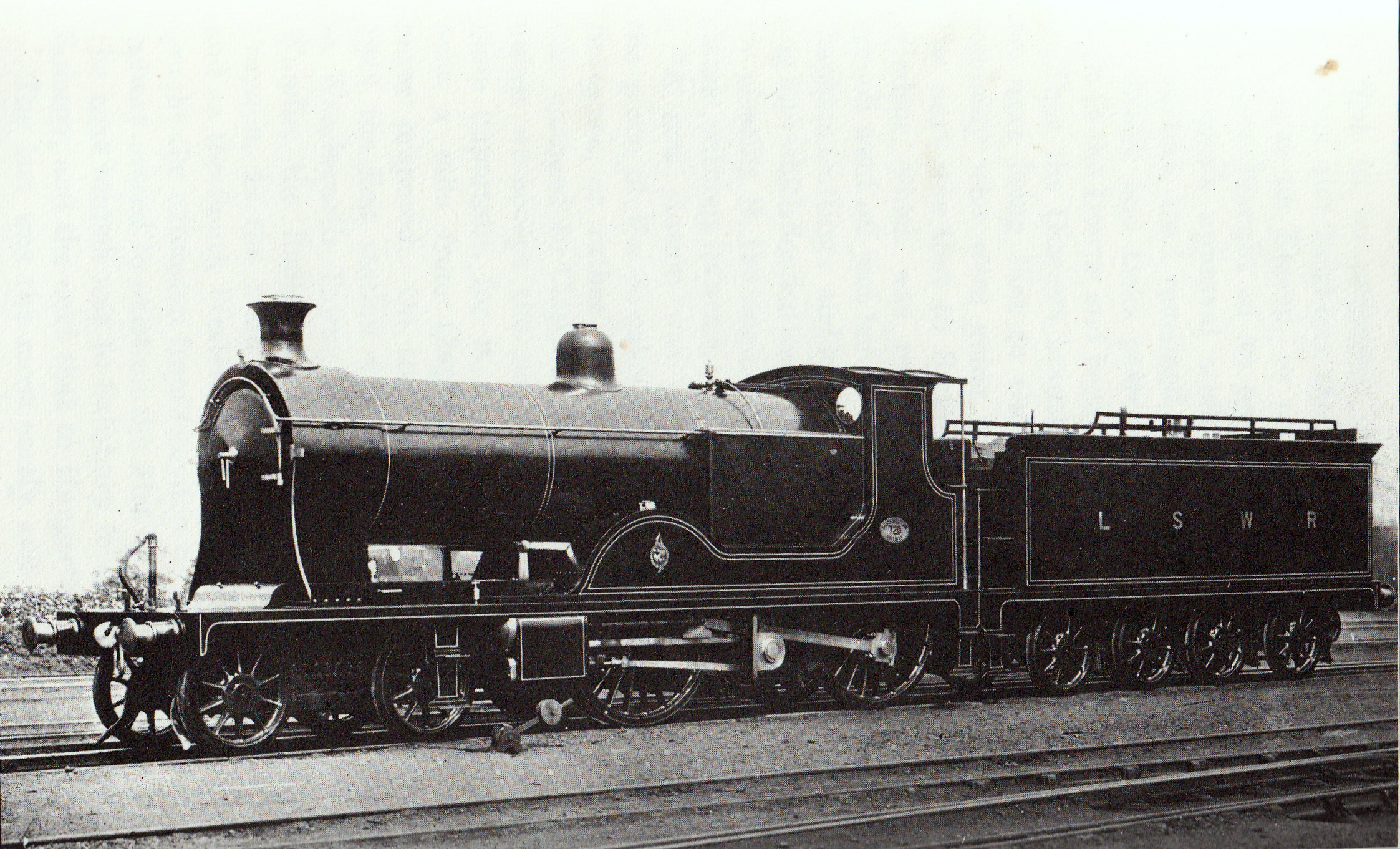
- LSWR T7 4-2-2-0
Type and origin
- Power type: Steam
- Designer: Dugald Drummond
- Builder: Nine Elms Works
- Build date: T7: 1897; E10: 1901
- Total produced: T7: 1 E10: 5
Specifications
- Configuration
  - Whyte: 4-2-2-0
  - UIC: 2'AA n4
- Gauge: 4 ft 8 1/2 in (1,435 mm)
- Leading dia.: 3 ft 7 in (1,090 mm)
- Driver dia.: 6 ft 7 in (2,010 mm)
- Length: 63 ft 9 in (19.43 m)
- Loco weight: T7: 54.55 long tons (55.43 t); T7 rebuild: 61.05 long tons (62.03 t); E10: 58.7 long tons (59.6 t)
- Fuel type: Coal
- Fuel capacity: 5 long tons (5.1 t)
- Water cap.: 4,500 imp gal (20,000 L; 5,400 US gal)
- Boiler pressure: 175 psi (1.21 MPa)
- Cylinders: 4
- Cylinder size: T7: 16.5 in × 26 in (420 mm × 660 mm) later 14 in × 26 in (360 mm × 660 mm); E10: 14 in × 26 in (360 mm × 660 mm)
Performance figures
- Tractive effort: 18,062 lbf (80.34 kN) (with 14 in cylinders and at 80% boiler pressure)
Career
- Operators: London and South Western Railway, Southern Railway
- Class: LSWR, SR: T7 and E10
- Numbers: LSWR & SR: T7: 720; E10: 369-373
- Locale: Great Britain
- Retired: 1926-1927

The LSWR Class T7 4-2-2-0 was a prototype express steam locomotive design by Dugald Drummond for the London and South Western Railway introduced in 1897. Five similar locomotives, classified E10, were introduced in 1901.

== Background ==
Number 720 was a prototype locomotive built in 1897 and classified T7. The layout was unusual and influenced by Francis Webb's 3-cylinder compound locomotives introduced in 1883 on the London and North Western Railway (LNWR) that employed two pairs of uncoupled driving wheels; the Drummond locomotives were always known as the "double singles". Five similar locomotives, numbers 369-373, were built in 1901 and classified E10.

== Design features ==
Throughout locomotive history, the layout of uncoupled driving wheels mounted on a shared rigid frame was repeatedly tried with various aims (the best-known example being the duplex locomotive). Drummond's motive appears to have been obtaining the largest grate area at a time where low-pitched boilers were the norm with the firebox low between the wheels. This limited the grate's width whilst its length depended on the coupled wheelbase minus the throw of eventual inside cranks. As well, there was reluctance to have longer coupling rods over concerns material material resistance, since a broken coupling rod could hit the locomotive or trackside objects. One way to resolve this was removing the coupling rods and having two independent pairs of driving wheels driven by separate cylinders.

=== Earlier experiments ===
The first engineer known to have tried this was Francis Webb, followed by Alfred de Glehn in France who initially combined divided drive and independent driving axles, finally opting solely for the former with connected driving axles. Both designers' locomotives were compounds, the layout also separating the high-pressure from low-pressure drive trains.

=== Drummond's locomotives ===
Boiler

The T7 and E10 were both simple expansion, so the principal benefit would be an increased grate area. Compared with Drummond's standard boilers, the T7's barrel length was increased by 1 ft 6 in (0.46 m) to 12 ft (3.7 m).

Valve gear

Another unusual feature of both classes was their valve gear. The valves for the inner cylinders were Stephenson and those for the outer were Joy valve gears.

== Rebuild ==
In 1905, number 720 was rebuilt with a larger boiler with the diameter increased by 5.25 in (0.133 m) to 4 ft 10.75 in (1.4923 m). The E10s were not rebuilt.

== Construction history ==
- T7, 1 locomotive built 1897, number 720
- E10, 5 locomotives built 1901, numbers 369-373
