= 4-2-2-0 =

Steam locomotive wheel arrangement

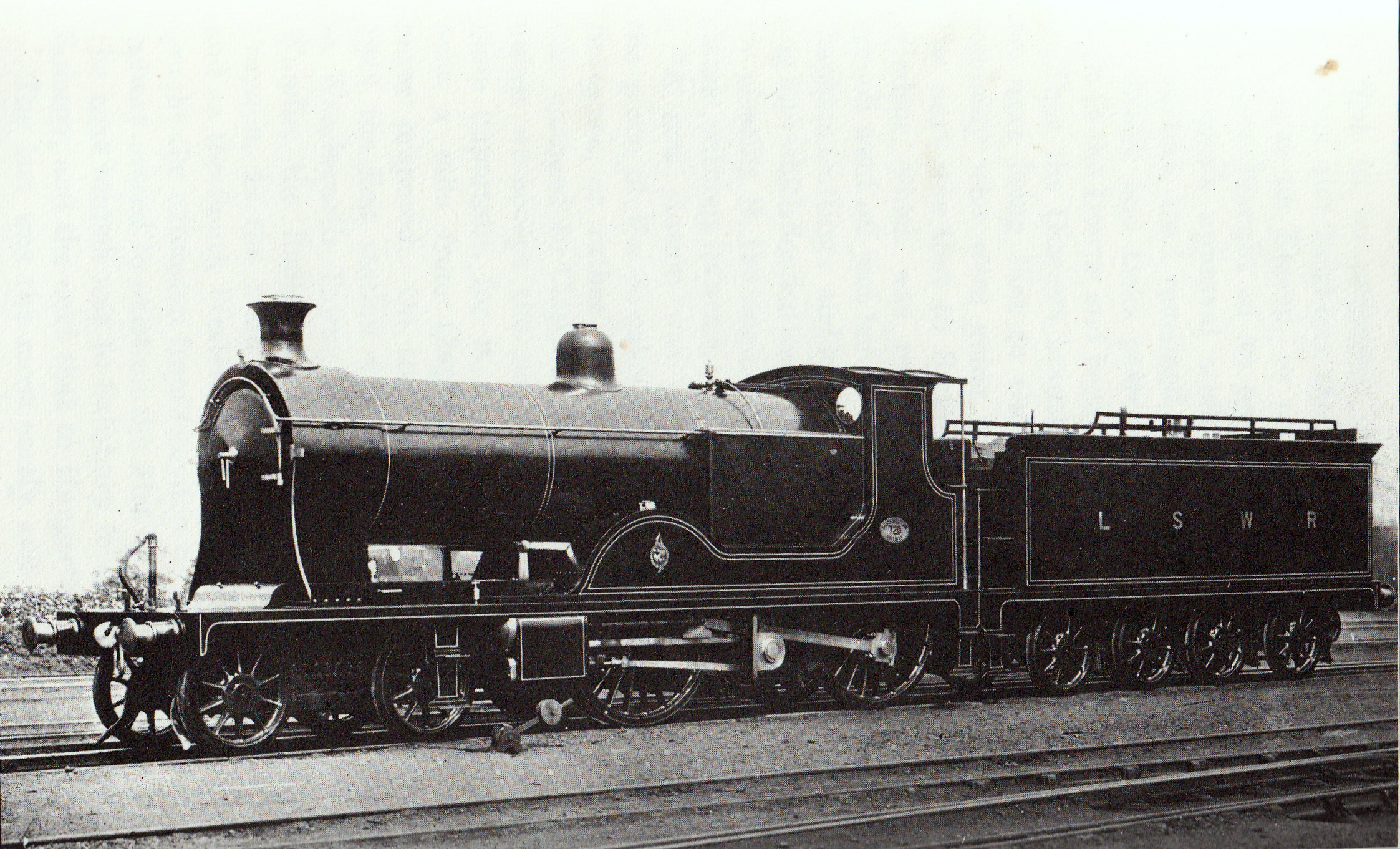
Prototype LSWR T7 4-2-2-0

Under the Whyte notation for the classification of steam locomotives, 4-2-2-0 represents the wheel arrangement of four leading wheels on two axles, four independently driven driving wheels on two axles, and no trailing wheels. The arrangement became known as double single.

== Usage ==
This unusual wheel arrangement was first used 1884 by Francis Webb in LNWR No. 3026, a 3-cylinder rebuild of a Metropolitan 4-4-0 Tank engine.

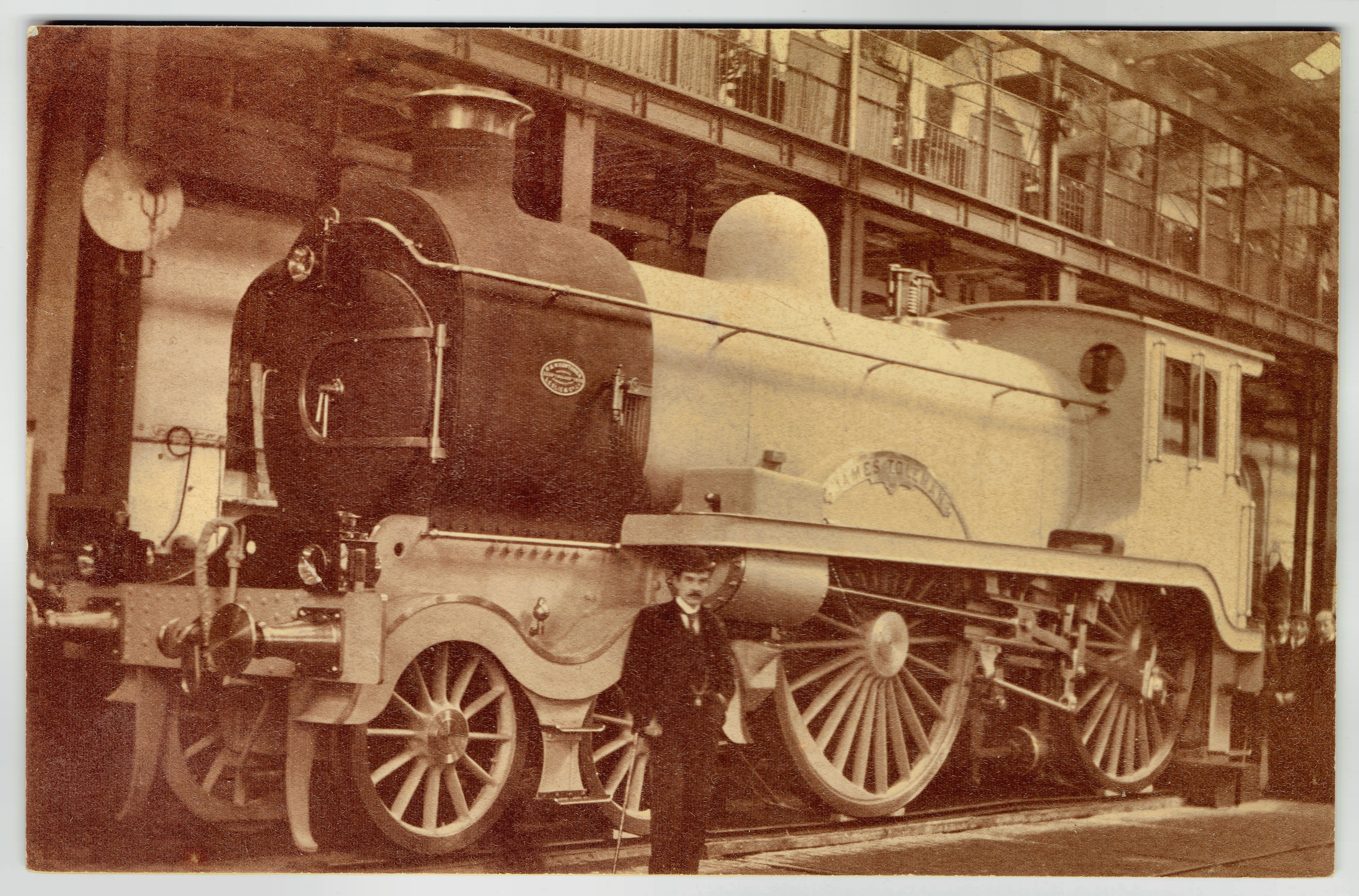
The James Toleman

In 1893, the arrangement was used by the British engineer Frederick Charles Winby for the locomotive James Toleman, built by Hawthorn Leslie & Company in Britain. It was exhibited at the World's Columbian Exposition in Chicago and then delivered to the Milwaukee Road.

Between 1897 and 1901 Dugald Drummond of the London and South Western Railway used this wheel arrangement on two classes of divided drive locomotives, the T7 and E10 classes. The absence of coupling rods enabled the driving wheels to be more widely spaced than on a 4-4-0 locomotive and permitted the inclusion of a larger firebox

Six locomotives of the type were built which performed adequately, but the uncoupled drivers led to poorer balance and increased wheelslip compared to 4-4-0s, thus the type was not perpetuated.
