= 2-8-8-8-4 =

Articulated steam locomotive wheel arrangement

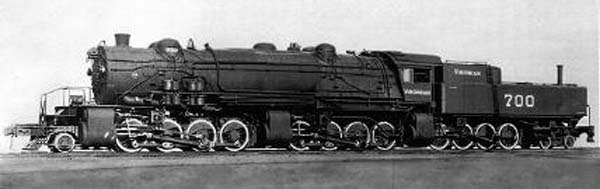
The sole 1916 Baldwin-built Virginian Railway Class XA 2-8-8-8-4 Triplex Type locomotive

Under the Whyte notation for the classification of steam locomotives, a 2-8-8-8-4 has two leading wheels, three sets of eight driving wheels, and four trailing wheels.

Other equivalent classifications are:

UIC classification: (1′D)D(D2′)
French classification: 140+040+042
Turkish classification: 45+44+46
Swiss classification: 4/5+4/4+4/6

Only one 2-8-8-8-4 was ever built: a Mallet-type built by Baldwin Locomotive Works for the Virginian Railway in 1916. Called the XA for "experimental", it was nicknamed "Triplex" like the Virginian's large articulated electrics and the Erie Railroad's 2-8-8-8-2s. The tender had a four-wheel truck at the rear to help guide the locomotive into curves while moving downhill.

The XA was unable to sustain a speed greater than five miles an hour, since the six cylinders could easily consume more steam than the boiler could produce.

When operating in compound, the high-pressure steam was divided between the cylinders of the center engine. The exhaust from one cylinder was piped to the front articulated engine. The exhaust from the other center engine cylinder was piped to the tender engine. The exhaust from the front engine was piped to the exhaust nozzle inside the firebox to generate draft through the firebox, through the fire tubes, and out the exhaust stack. The exhaust from the tender engine went out of a stack at the rear of the tender water tank. It did not contribute to draft and was wasted.

In 1920, the railroad sent the XA back to Baldwin, which rebuilt it as two locomotives: No. 610, a Class AF 2-8-8-0; and No. 410, a Class MD 2-8-2. Both locomotives pulled freight trains until 1953, when they were replaced by EMD, GE and ALCO diesel locomotives, and were later scrapped.
