= Whyte notation =

Code for arrangement of locomotive wheels

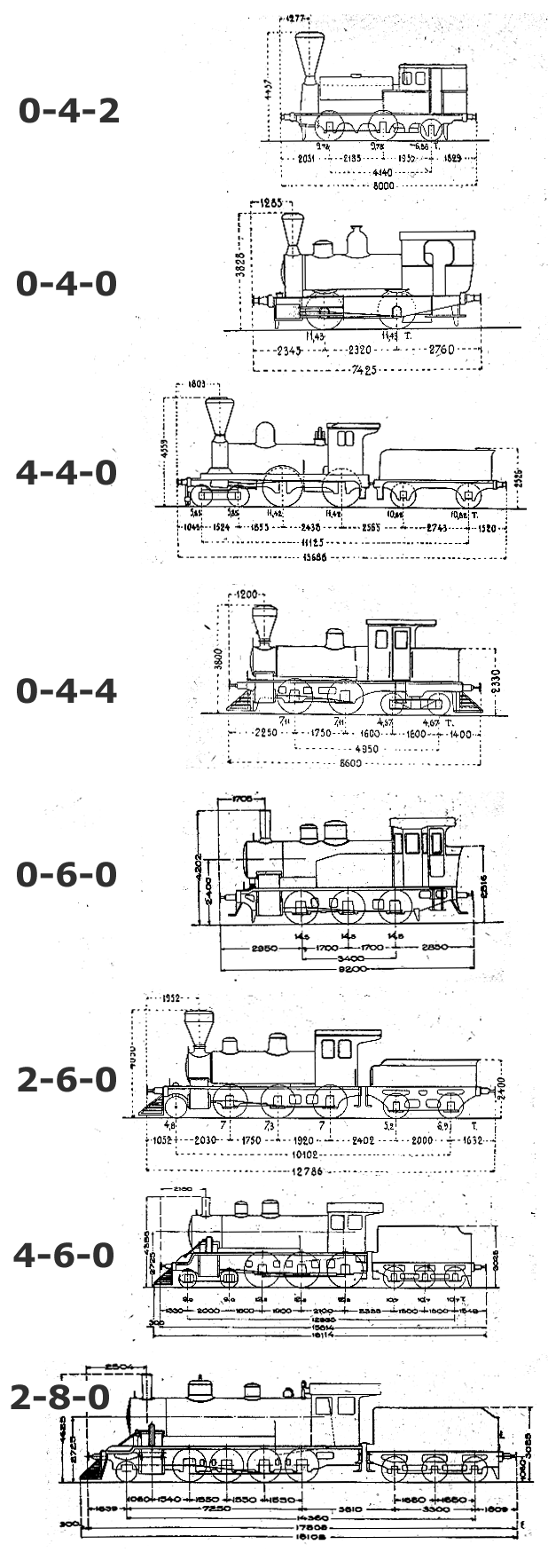
A selection of early 20th century locomotive types according to their Whyte notation and their comparative size

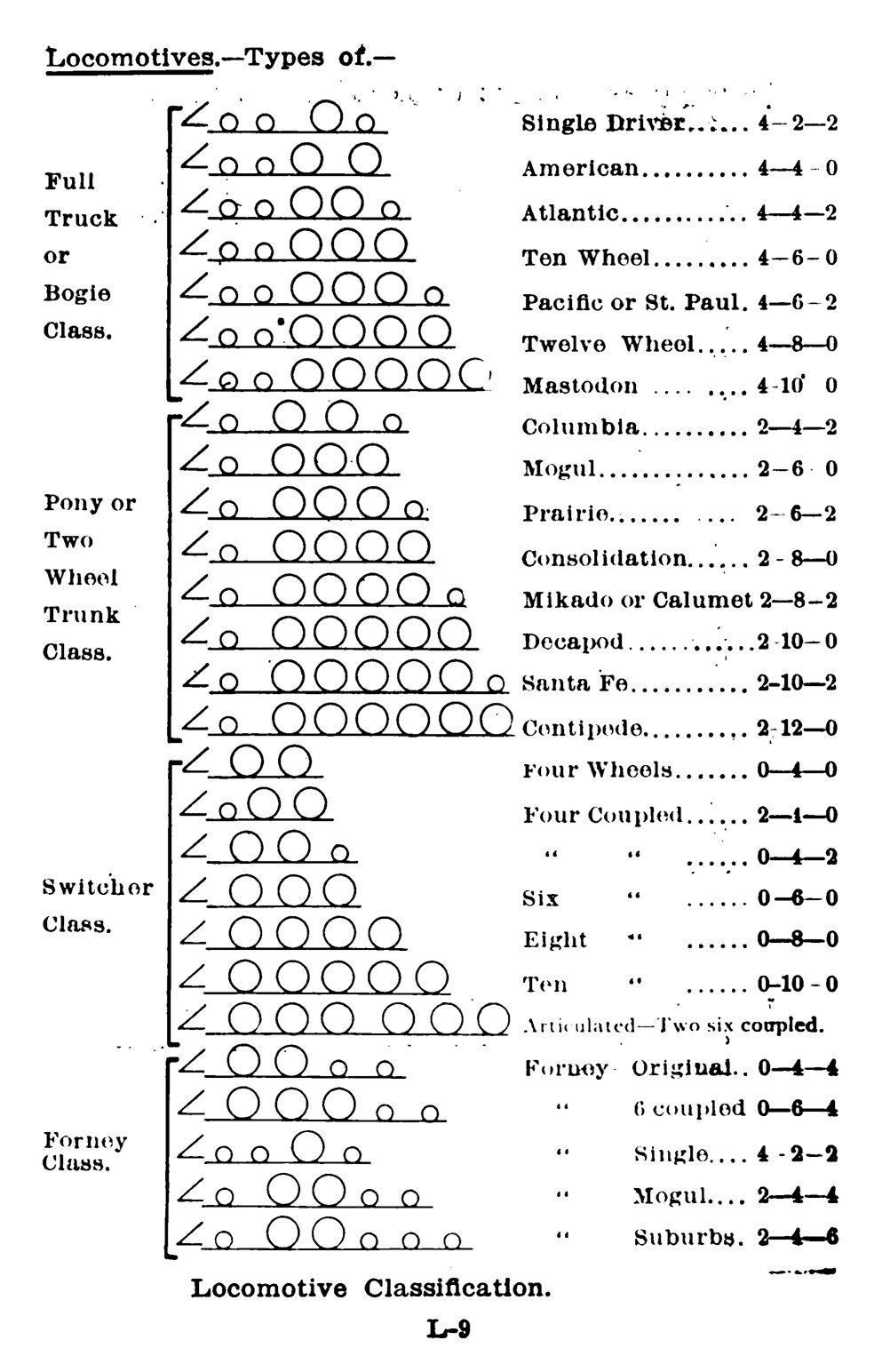
Whyte notation from a handbook for railroad industry workers published in 1906

The Whyte notation is a classification method for locomotives based on wheel arrangement. While the Whyte notation is most commonly used when referring to steam locomotives, it can also be applied to some internal combustion and electric locomotives. It was devised by Frederick Methvan Whyte, and came into use in the early twentieth century following a December 1900 editorial in American Engineer and Railroad Journal.

The notation was adopted and remains in use in North America and the United Kingdom to describe the wheel arrangements of steam locomotives. In most modern locomotives, multiple units and trams the Whyte notation has been supplanted by the UIC system in Europe and by the AAR system in North America. Geared steam locomotives do not use the notation. They are classified by their model and their number of trucks.

== Structure of the system ==
=== Basic form ===
The notation in its basic form counts the number of leading wheels, then the number of driving wheels, and finally the number of trailing wheels, numbers being separated by dashes. For example, a locomotive with two leading axles (four wheels) in front, then three driving axles (six wheels) and then one trailing axle (two wheels) is classified as a 4-6-2 locomotive, and is commonly known as a Pacific.

=== Denotion of other locomotives ===
==== Articulated locomotives ====
For articulated locomotives that have two wheelsets, such as Garratts, which are effectively two locomotives joined by a common boiler, each wheelset is denoted separately, with a plus sign (+) between them. Thus a 4-6-2-type Garratt is a 4-6-2+2-6-4. For Garratt locomotives, the plus sign is used even when there are no intermediate unpowered wheels, e.g. the LMS Garratt 2-6-0+0-6-2. This is because the two engine units are more than just power bogies. They are complete engines, carrying fuel and water tanks. The plus sign represents the bridge (carrying the boiler) that links the two engines.

Simpler articulated types, such as Mallets, have a jointed frame under a common boiler where there are no unpowered wheels between the sets of powered wheels. Typically, the forward frame is free to swing, whereas the rear frame is rigid with the boiler. Thus, a Union Pacific Big Boy is a 4-8-8-4: four leading wheels, one group of eight driving wheels, another group of eight driving wheels, and then four trailing wheels. Sometimes articulated locomotives of this type are denoted with a “+” between each driving wheels set (so in the previous case, the Big Boy would be a 4-8+8-4). This may have been developed to distinguish articulated and duplex arrangements; duplex arrangements would get a “-“ being rigid and articulated locomotives would get a “+” being flexible. However, given all the wheel arrangements for duplex locomotives have been mutually exclusive to them, it is usually considered unnecessary and thus another “-“ is usually used.

Triplex locomotives, and any theoretical larger ones, simply expand on basic articulated locomotives, for example, 2-8-8-8-2. In the case of the Belgian quadruplex locomotive, the arrangement is listed as 0-6-2+2-4-2-4-2+2-6-0.

==== Duplex locomotives ====
For duplex locomotives, which have two sets of coupled driving wheels mounted rigidly on the same frame, the same method is used as for Mallet articulated locomotives – the number of leading wheels is placed first, followed by the leading set of driving wheels, followed by the trailing set of driving wheels, followed by the trailing wheels, each number being separated by a hyphen.

==== Tank locomotives ====
A number of standard suffixes can be used to extend the Whyte notation for tank locomotives:

Suffix	Meaning	Example
[No Suffix]	Tender locomotive	0-6-0
T	Tank locomotive	0-6-2T
ST	Saddle tank locomotive	0-4-0ST
WT	Well tank locomotive	0-4-0WT
PT	Pannier tank locomotive	0-6-0PT
C or CT	Crane tank locomotive	0-6-2CT
IST	Inverted saddle tank locomotive	0-4-2IST
T+T (or ST+T, WT+T, etc.)	Tender-tank locomotive	0-4-0T+T
WT	Wing tank locomotive	0-4-0WT
RT	Rear tank locomotive	0-4-4RT

==== Other steam locomotives ====
Various other types of steam locomotive can be also denoted through suffixes:

VB or VBT	Vertical boilered locomotive	0-6-0VB
F	Fireless locomotive	0-6-0F
CA	Compressed air locomotive	0-6-0CA
R	Railcar	0-4-4-0R
R or RT	Rack locomotive	0-4-0RT

==== Internal combustion locomotives ====
The wheel arrangement of small diesel and petrol locomotives can be classified using the same notation as steam locomotives, e.g. 0-4-0, 0-6-0, 0-8-0. Where the axles are coupled by chains or shafts (rather than side rods) or are individually driven, the terms 4w (4-wheeled), 6w (6-wheeled) or 8w (8-wheeled) are generally used. For larger locomotives, the UIC classification is more commonly used.

Various suffixes are also used to denote the different types of internal combustion locomotives:

Suffix	Meaning	Example
PM	Petrol-mechanical locomotive	4wPM
PE	Petrol-electric locomotive	0-6-0PE
D	Diesel locomotive	6wD
DM	Diesel–mechanical locomotive	8wDM
DE	Diesel–electric locomotive	0-4-0DE
DH	Diesel–hydraulic locomotive	0-6-0DH

==== Electric locomotives ====
The wheel arrangement of small electric locomotives can be denoted using this notation, like with internal combustion locomotives.

Suffixes used for electric locomotives include:

Suffix	Meaning	Example
BE	Battery-electric locomotive	4wBE
OE	Overhead-lines electric locomotive	0-8-0OE
RE	Third rail electric locomotive	4wRE

== Wheel arrangement names ==
In American (and to a lesser extent British) practice, most wheel arrangements in common use were given names, sometimes from the name of the first such locomotive built. For example, the 2-2-0 type arrangement is named Planet, after the 1830 locomotive on which it was first used. (This naming convention is similar to the naming of warship classes.) Note that several wheel arrangements had multiple names, and some names were only used in some countries.

Wheel arrangements under the Whyte system are listed below. In the diagrams, the front of the locomotive is to the left.

Arrangement (locomotive front is to the left)	Whyte classification	Name	No. of units produced
Non-articulated locomotives
	0-2-2	Northumbrian (after the 1830 locomotive Northumbrian)	
	0-2-4		
	2-2-0	Planet	
	2-2-2	Single, Jenny Lind	
	2-2-4	Aerolite	
	4-2-0	Jervis	
	4-2-2	Bicycle	
	4-2-4	Huntington	
	6-2-0	Crampton	
	0-4-0	Four-wheel switch	
	0-4-0+4		
	0-4-2	Olomana	
	0-4-4	Forney	
	0-4-6	Used on Engerth articulated locomotives	
	2-4-0	Porter, 'Old English'	
	2-4-2	Columbia	
	2-4-4	Forney, Mason Bogie	
	4-4-0	American, eight-wheeler	
	4-4-2	Atlantic	
	4-4-4	Reading, Jubilee (Canada)	
	0-3-0	(one driving wheel per axle; used on Patiala State Monorail Trainways and also on the Listowel and Ballybunion Railway)	
	0-6-0	Six-coupled, Six-wheel switch, Bourbonnais (France - tender), Boer (France - tank)	
	0-6-2	Branchliner, Webb	
	0-6-4	Forney six-coupled	
	0-6-6	Forney six-coupled	
	2-6-0	Mogul	11,000
	2-6-2	Prairie	
	2-6-4	Adriatic	
	2-6-6	Mason Bogie	
	4-6-0	Ten-wheeler (not Britain)	
	4-6-2	Pacific	6,800
	4-6-4	Hudson, Baltic	
	4-6-6	Use on the Boston and Albany Railroad.	
	0-8-0	Eight-coupled	
	0-8-2	Transfer	
	0-8-4		
	0-8-6	Used on Engerth articulated locomotives	
	2-8-0	Consolidation	35,000
	2-8-2	Mikado, Mike, MacArthur	
	2-8-4	Berkshire, Kanawha	
	2-8-6	Used only on four Mason Bogie locomotives	
	4-8-0	Twelve Wheeler, Mastodon	
	4-8-2	Mountain, Mohawk (NYC)	
	4-8-4	Northern, Niagara, Confederation, Dixie, Greenbrier, Pocono, Potomac, Heavy Mountain (Atchison, Topeka, and Santa Fe), Golden State (Southern Pacific), Western, Laurentian (Delaware & Hudson Railroad), General, Wyoming (Lehigh Valley), Governor, Big Apple, GS Series "Daylight" (Southern Pacific)	
	4-8-6	Proposed by Lima, never built	
	6-8-6	Turbine, only used on the PRR S2 Steam Turbine	1
	0-10-0	Ten-coupled, Ten-wheel switch	
	0-10-2	Union	
	2-10-0	Decapod, Russian Decapod	
	2-10-2	Santa Fe	
	2-10-4	Texas, Colorado (CB&Q), Selkirk (Canada)	
	2-10-6	Proposed by Indian Railways, never built	
	4-10-0	Mastodon	
	4-10-2	Reid Tenwheeler, Southern Pacific, Overland, Super Mountain	
	0-12-0	12-coupled	
	0-12-2	Used in Argentina	
	2-12-0	Centipede	
	2-12-2	Javanic	30
	2-12-4		20
	2-12-6	Proposed by Lima, never built	
	4-12-2	Union Pacific	88
	4-14-4	AA20, Soviet	1
Divided drive and duplex locomotives
	0-2-2-0	Used on the Mount Washington Cog Railway	
	2-2-2-0		
	2-2-2-2		
	2-2-4-0		1
	4-2-2-0	Double single	
	2-4-6-2		
	4-4-4-2	Planned for proposed ACE 3000 locomotive.	
	4-4-4-4	(PRR T1)	53
	6-4-4-6	(PRR S1)	1
	4-4-6-4	(PRR Q2)	26
	4-6-4-4	(PRR Q1)	1
Articulated locomotives (simple and compound)
	0-4-4-0		
	2-4-4-0		5
	0-4-4-2		
	2-4-4-2	Little River	
	4-4-6-2	Used by the Santa Fe	2
	0-6-4-0	Used on Engerth articulated locomotives	4
	0-6-6-0		
	2-6-6-0		
	2-6-6-2		1,300
	2-6-6-4		60
	2-6-6-6	Allegheny, Blue Ridge	68
	4-6-6-2	(Southern Pacific class AM-2)	
	4-6-6-4	Challenger	252
	0-8-6-0		
	2-6-8-0	(Southern Railway, Great Northern Railway)	39
	0-8-8-0	Angus	
	2-8-8-0	Bull Moose	
	2-8-8-2	Chesapeake	222
	2-8-8-4	Yellowstone	78
	4-8-8-2	Cab Forward	195
	4-8-8-4	Big Boy	25
	2-10-10-2	(Santa Fe and Virginian railroads)	20
	2-6-6-8-2	Alco triplex proposed to the C&O	0
	2-8-8-8-2	Triplex (Erie RR)	3
	2-8-8-8-4	Triplex (Virginian RR)	1
Garratt articulated locomotives
	0-4-0+0-4-0	Double Four-coupled, Double Four-wheel switch	
	0-6-0+0-6-0	Double Six-coupled, Double Six-wheel switch	
	2-4-0+0-4-2	Double Porter, Double ’Old English’	
	2-4-2+2-4-2	Double Colombia	
	2-6-0+0-6-2	Double Mogul	
	2-6-2+2-6-2	Double Prairie	
	2-8-0+0-8-2	Double Consolidation	
	2-8-2+2-8-2	Double Mikado	
	4-4-2+2-4-4	Double Atlantic	
	4-6-0+0-6-4	Double Ten-wheeler	
	4-6-2+2-6-4	Double Pacific	
	4-6-4+4-6-4	Double Hudson	
	4-8-0+0-8-4	Double Twelve Wheeler, Double Mastodon	
	4-8-2+2-8-4	Double Mountain, Double Mohawk	
	4-8-4+4-8-4	Double Northern, Double Niagara, Double Confederation, Double Dixie, Double Greenbrier, Double Pocono, Double Potomac, Double Heavy Mountain, Double Golden State, Double Western, Double Laurentian, Double General, Double Wyoming, Double Governor, Double Big Apple	

== See also ==
- AAR wheel arrangement
- Swiss locomotive and railcar classification
- UIC classification
- Wheel arrangement
