= Driving wheel =

Powered wheel of a locomotive

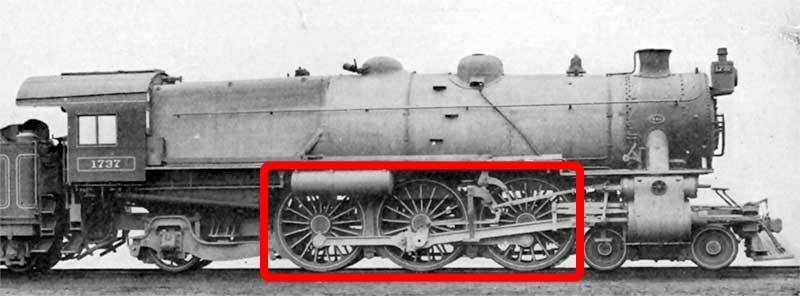
The driving wheels (boxed) on Pennsylvania Railroad 1737

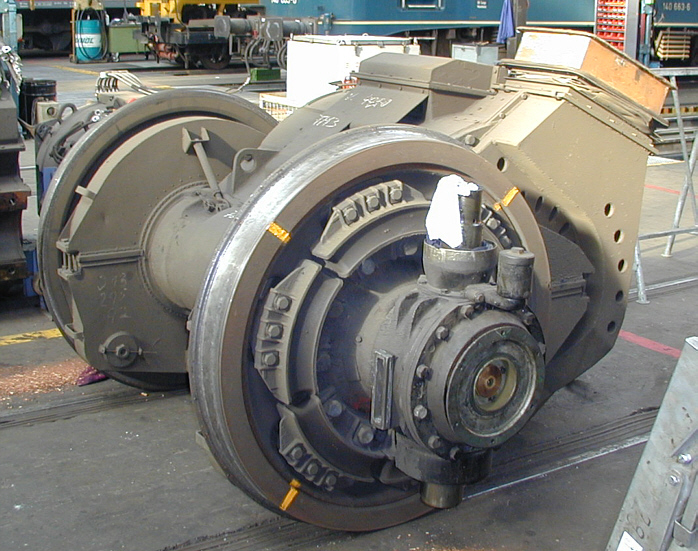
Traction motor for a German locomotive

On a steam locomotive, a driving wheel is a powered wheel which is driven by the locomotive's pistons (or turbine, in the case of a steam turbine locomotive). On a conventional, non-articulated locomotive, the driving wheels are all coupled together with side rods (also known as coupling rods); normally one pair is directly driven by the main rod, or connecting rod, which is connected to the end of the piston rod; power is transmitted to the others through the side rods.

On diesel and electric locomotives, the driving wheels may be directly driven by the traction motors. Coupling rods are not usually used, and it is quite common for each axle to have its own motor. Jackshaft drive and coupling rods were used in the past (e.g. in the Swiss Crocodile locomotive) but their use is now confined to shunter locomotives.

On an articulated locomotive or a duplex locomotive, driving wheels are grouped into sets with wheels within each set linked together.

== Diameter ==
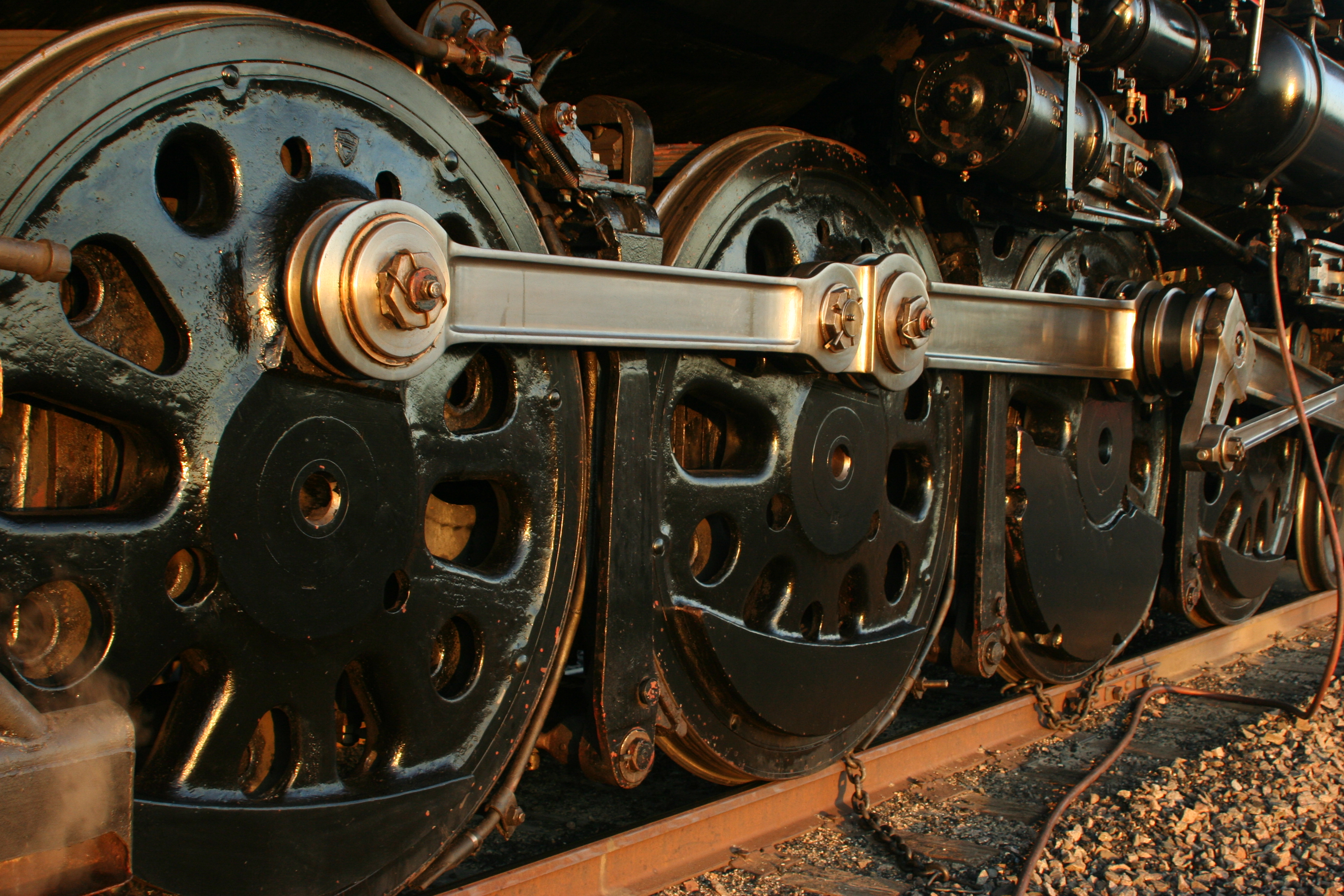
Half of the driving wheels of Milwaukee Road 261

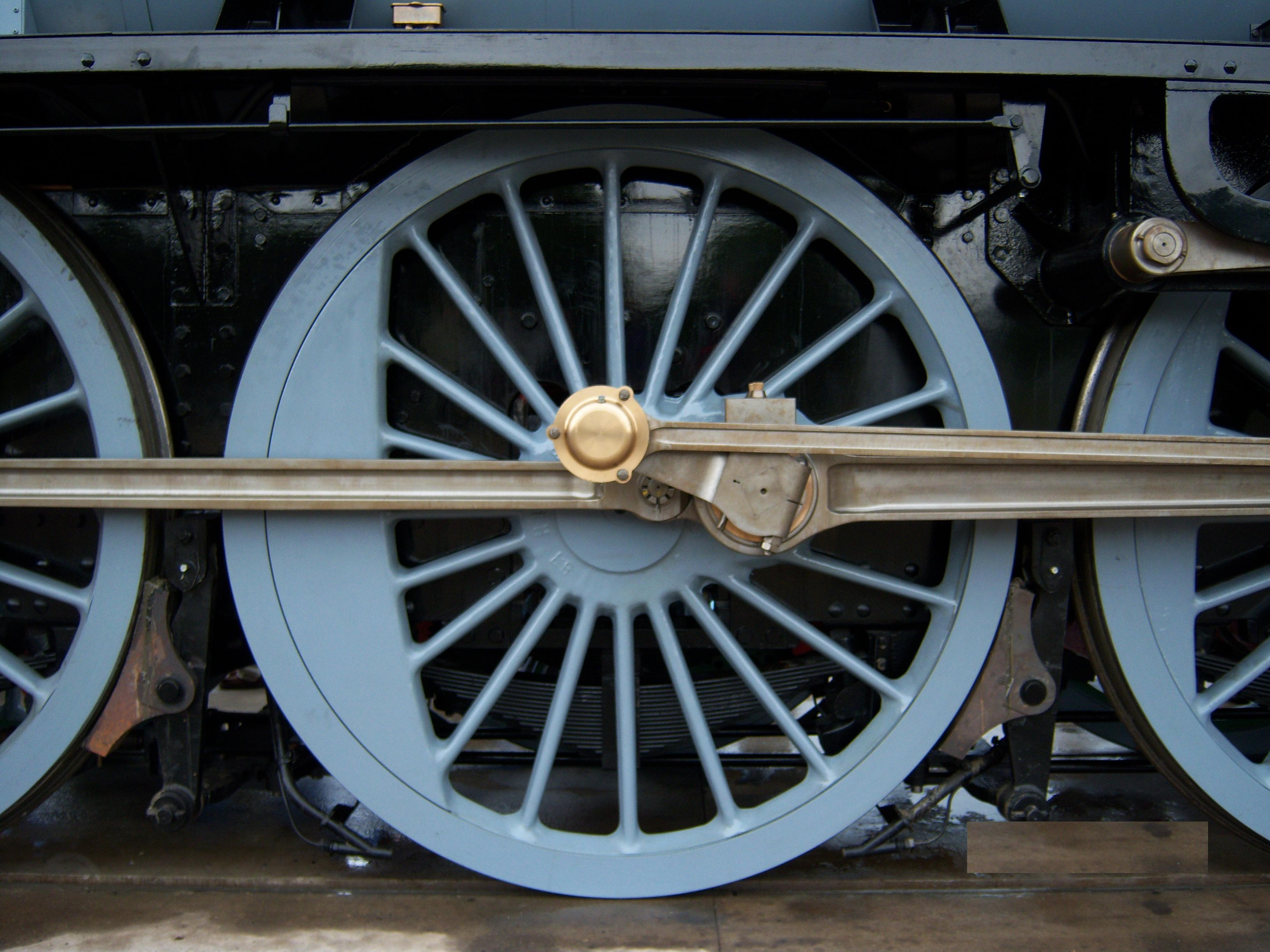
One of six 6 ft 8 in (2.03 m) driving wheels belonging to 60163 Tornado

Driving wheels are generally larger than leading or trailing wheels. Since a conventional steam locomotive is directly driven, one of the few ways to 'gear' a locomotive for a particular performance goal is to size the driving wheels appropriately. Freight locomotives generally had driving wheels between 40 and 60 inches (1,016 and 1,524 mm) in diameter; dual-purpose locomotives generally between 60 and 70 inches (1,524 and 1,778 mm), and passenger locomotives between 70 and 100 inches (1,778 and 2,540 mm) or so.

The driving wheels on express passenger locomotives have come down in diameter over the years, e.g. from 8 ft 1 in (2,464 mm) on the GNR Stirling 4-2-2 of 1870 to 6 ft 2 in (1,880 mm) on the SR Merchant Navy Class of 1941. This is because improvements in valve design allowed for higher piston speeds.

== Flangeless wheels ==
Some long-wheelbase locomotives (four or more coupled axles) were equipped with blind drivers. These were driving wheels without the usual flanges, which allowed them to negotiate tighter curves without binding.

Some three-driving-axle locomotives also had flangeless wheels on the middle axle, such as Everett Railroad 11, and the NZR WH class.

== Balancing ==
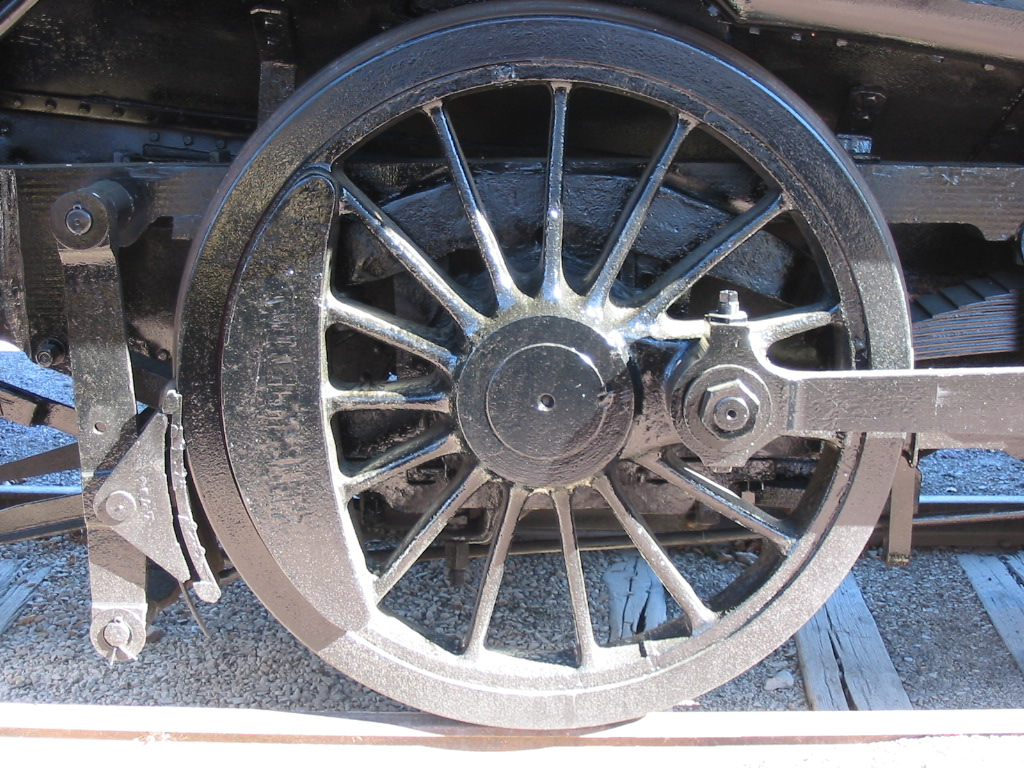
A flangeless driving wheel on a steam locomotive

On locomotives with side rods, including most steam and jackshaft locomotives, the driving wheels have weights to balance the weight of the coupling and connecting rods. The crescent-shaped balance weight is clearly visible in the illustrative image.

== Whyte notation ==
In the Whyte notation, driving wheels are designated by the middle number or numbers in the set. The UIC classification system counts the number of axles rather than the number of wheels and driving wheels are designated by letters rather than numbers. The suffix 'o' is used to indicate independently-powered axles.

The number of driving wheels on locomotives varied quite a bit. Some early locomotives had as few as two driving wheels (one axle). The largest number of total driving wheels was 24 (twelve axles) on the 2-8-8-8-2 and 2-8-8-8-4 locomotives. The largest number of coupled driving wheels was 14 (seven axles) on the ill-fated AA20 4-14-4 locomotive.

== Other uses of the term driving wheel ==
The term driving wheel is sometimes used to denote the drive sprocket which moves the track on tracked vehicles such as tanks and bulldozers.

== In popular culture ==
Many American roots artists, including The Byrds, Tom Rush, The Black Crowes and Cowboy Junkies, have performed a song written by David Wiffen called "Driving Wheel", with the lyrics "I feel like some old engine/ That's lost my driving wheel." These lyrics are a reference to the traditional blues song "Broke Down Engine Blues" by Blind Willie McTell, 1931. It was later directly covered by Bob Dylan and Johnny Winter.

Many versions of the American folk song "In the Pines" performed by artists such as Leadbelly, Mark Lanegan (on The Winding Sheet), and Nirvana (On MTV Unplugged In New York) reference a decapitated man's head found in a driving wheel. In addition, it is likely that Chuck Berry references the locomotive driving wheel in "Johnny B. Goode" when he sings, "the engineers would see him sitting in the shade / Strumming with the rhythm that the drivers made."

== See also ==
- AAR wheel arrangement
- Boxpok
- Drive axle
- Sprocket wheel
- UIC classification
- Whyte notation
