= Quadruplex =

Quadruplex may refer to:

- Quadruplex (New Orleans), a softball complex in New Orleans City Park
- Quadruplex telegraph, an improvement on the electrical telegraph patented in 1874 by Thomas Edison
- Two-inch quadruplex videotape, the first practical and commercially successful videotape format
- G-quadruplex, a four-stranded nucleic acid structure rich in guanine
- C-quadruplex, a four-stranded nucleic acid structure rich in cytosine, found in I-motif DNA
- Quadruplex, a building split into four apartments, similar to a duplex
- Quadruplex locomotive, a locomotive with four sets of driving wheels
