= C18H16N2O2 =

The molecular formula C_{18}H_{16}N_{2}O_{2} (molar mass: 292.338 g/mol) may refer to:

- Endophenazine A
- Blebbistatin
