= 2-8-8-8-8-2 =

Locomotive wheel arrangement

Under the Whyte notation for the classification of steam locomotives, a 2-8-8-8-8-2 has two leading wheels, four sets of eight driving wheels, and two trailing wheels. Because of its length, such a locomotive must be an multiplex locomotive. It is longer than a normal articulated locomotive; the fourth set of drivers is located under the tender.

Other equivalent classifications are:
UIC classification: 1-D-D-D-D-1 (also known as German classification and Italian classification)
AAR classification: 1-D-D-D-D-1
French classification: 140+040+040+041
Turkish classification: 45+44+44+45
Swiss classification: 4/5+4/4+4/4+4/5

The equivalent UIC classification is to be refined to (1'D)DD(D1').

== Usage ==
This type of articulated locomotive was never built, the only proposal for such a locomotive came from the United States. George R. Henderson was granted US Patent 1,100,563 for a quadruplex locomotive, in June 1914. The patent was assigned to the Baldwin Locomotive Company. Baldwin presented the design to the Atchison, Topeka, & Santa Fe Railway (AT&SF), which was a strong proponent of compound locomotives in the 1910s.

This would have been, in 1913, by far the largest steam locomotive ever proposed. In quadruplex form, it would have been 129 feet 10 1/2 inches (39.586 m) in overall length, total weight of about 885,000 pounds (401 t), with tractive effort of 200,000 pounds-force (890 kN).

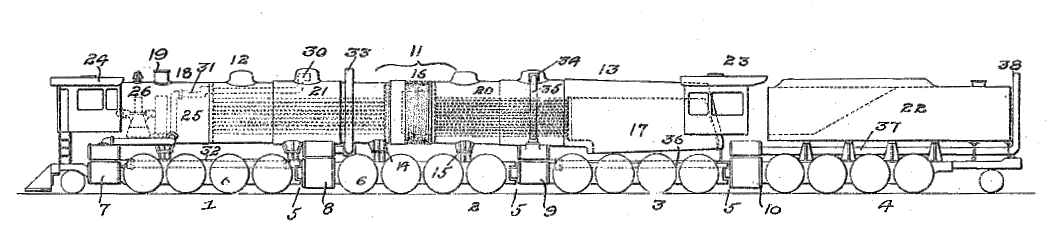
Patent application drawing for the Baldwin quadruplex locomotive, 1913

The Quadruplex was to comprise three articulated engines of 8 driving wheels each beneath the locomotive itself, and a fourth engine beneath the tender. As a compound locomotive, engine cylinders 7 and 9 (as numbered on the above image) would receive high pressure steam to drive the first and third engines, each would exhaust as low-pressure steam to power cylinders 8 and 10 on the second and fourth engines. Both sets of low-pressure cylinders would then exhaust direct to atmosphere through stacks 33 and 38. The drivers had a diameter of 60 in (1524 mm).

Due mostly to its extreme length the design included a number of mostly untried innovations:

- An engineer’s cab (24) at the very front, as well as a fireman’s cab (23) behind the firebox (17). Communication between the cabs was proposed as cable- or rod-operated signalling devices, similar to the engine order telegraph used on steamships, and possibly a voice pipe
- A jointed boiler with a flexible coupling (16) allowing the boiler casing to flex laterally on track curves. Such an accordion joint was already in use on a 2-6-6-2 locomotive of the AT&SF.
- Two separate boilers, served by the single firebox: The front boiler (21) to supply the front two engines, the rear boiler (20) to supply the rear two engines. Working pressure of the boiler would be 215 psi (15 bar).
- A turbine-driven extractor fan (26) within the smokebox (25) was intended to maintain a constant draft through the flues of both boilers. This was because Henderson had calculated that a conventional blast pipe using steam exhausted from the low-pressure cylinders would have been inadequate to provide a sufficient draft until the locomotive was in motion.

By the time the patent was granted, the experience of the existing triplexes and jointed-boiler locomotives had shown the shortcomings of these designs, and the quadruplex did not proceed to construction.
