= Streptomyces anulatus =

Scientific classification
- Domain: Bacteria
- Kingdom: Bacillati
- Phylum: Actinomycetota
- Class: Actinomycetes
- Order: Streptomycetales
- Family: Streptomycetaceae
- Genus: Streptomyces
- Species: S. anulatus

Binomial name
- Streptomyces anulatus (Beijerinck 1912) Waksman 1953 (Approved Lists 1980)

Type strain
- AS 4.1421, ATCC 27416, BCRC 15152, Beijerinck, CBS 100.18, CBS 100.18/670.72, CBS 670.72, CCRC 15152, CGMCC 4.1421, DSM 40361, ETH 31563, IFO 13369, IMET 43334, IMET 4334, ISP 5361, JCM 4721, KCC S-0721, KCCM 40190, KCTC 9756, Lanoot R-8661, LMG 19301, LMG 8583, NBRC 13369, NRRL B-2000, NRRL-ISP 5361, R-8661, RIA 1330, strain AS 4.1421, VKM Ac-728, VTT E-991427

Synonyms
- Streptomyces chrysomallus Streptomyces citreofluorescens Streptomyces fluorescens Streptomyces praecox Streptomyces chrysomallus subsp. chrysomallus Actinomyces Streptothrix annulatus Actinomyces annulatus Actinomyces citreofluorescens Actinomyces fluorescens

Species of bacterium

Streptomyces anulatus is a bacterium species from the genus Streptomyces which has been isolated from soil. Streptomyces anulatus produces cactinomycin, endophenazine A, endophenazine B, tubermycin B, endophenazine C, epocarbazolin A, epocarbazolin B, dextranase, telomestatin and actinomycin C.

== See also ==
- List of Streptomyces species
