= Jointed-boiler locomotive =

Unusual type of articulated locomotive

A jointed-boiler locomotive was a variant of the Mallet articulated locomotive, in which a flexible coupling was introduced midway along the length of the boiler casing, which allowed the boiler to bend laterally when the locomotive was on curved track.

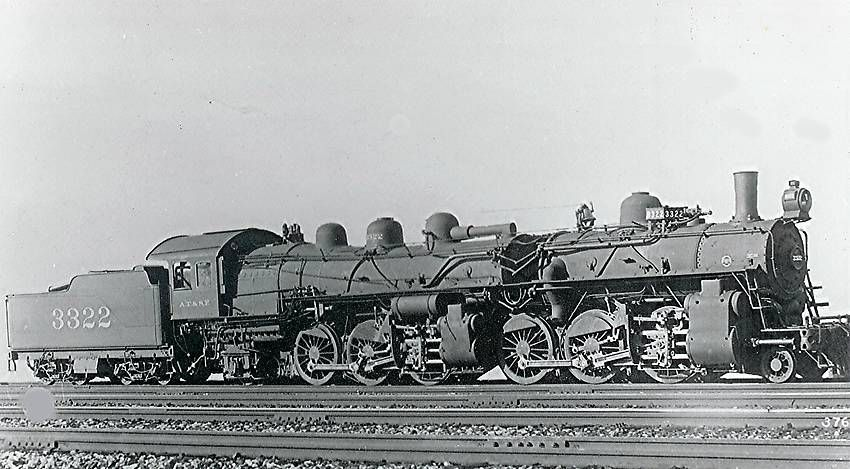
AT&SF locomotive 3322, with ball-joint type flexible boiler

Six such locomotives, all of 2-6-6-2 wheel arrangement, were built for the Atchison, Topeka & Santa Fe Railroad in 1910 and 1911. The first one built, number 1157, was assembled by the AT&SF in their Topeka shops from two 2-6-2’s (numbers 1051 and 1125). All the rest were built new by Baldwin Locomotive Works.

== Design ==
In a conventional Mallet, the rigid boiler is fixed to the rearmost of the two engine frames, with the front of the boiler supported on a sliding bearing over the pivoting front engine such that when the locomotive traverses a curved track, the front (smokebox) end of the boiler overhangs toward the outside of the curve. The jointed boiler, with the front half rigidly fixed to the front engine, eliminated this overhang. This new design was intended to reduce track wear, especially on curves where the outer rail carried a greater load, and to improve the riding characteristics of the locomotive.

== Construction ==
The two boiler sections served different functions: The rearmost section with the firebox generated and superheated the steam. The forward section contained a reheater (for low-pressure steam serving the front engine), feedwater heater and smokebox. The large flexible joint in the boiler casing carried only combustion gases, at or slightly below atmospheric pressure. Steam and water to the front section were delivered by pipes external to the main casing, with pivoting elbows in high-pressure steam lines, and hoses in water lines, as flexible connections.

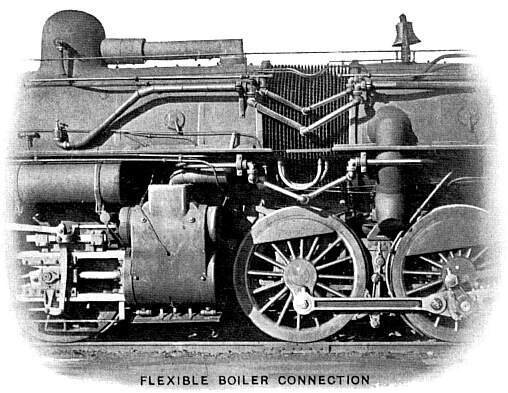
Bellows type flexible joint on AT&SF locomotive 1159

Two designs of the large flexible coupling were used:

- A double ball joint assembly consisting of cast iron sleeves, fitted one within the other and provided with compression straps to keep the joints air-tight while allowing lateral movement.
- A metal bellows joint, similar to a concertina, consisted of several pairs of concentric tapered steel rings, each riveted to its neighbor along alternating inside and outside edges. This design proved less successful because coal cinders would accumulate in the folds and force the seams open when the bellows was compressed. These were soon replaced with ball joints.

== Performance ==
The locos worked well enough that they remained in service for 15 to 18 years, but the hoped-for improvements in riding and track wear were not as great as had been hoped. The complicated construction required high maintenance, and no further examples were built. Jointed boilers were however included in Baldwin's patented but unbuilt 1913 proposals for massive 2-8-8-8-8-2 quadruplex and 2-8-8-8-8-8-2 quintuplex locomotives.
