= Endophenazine A =

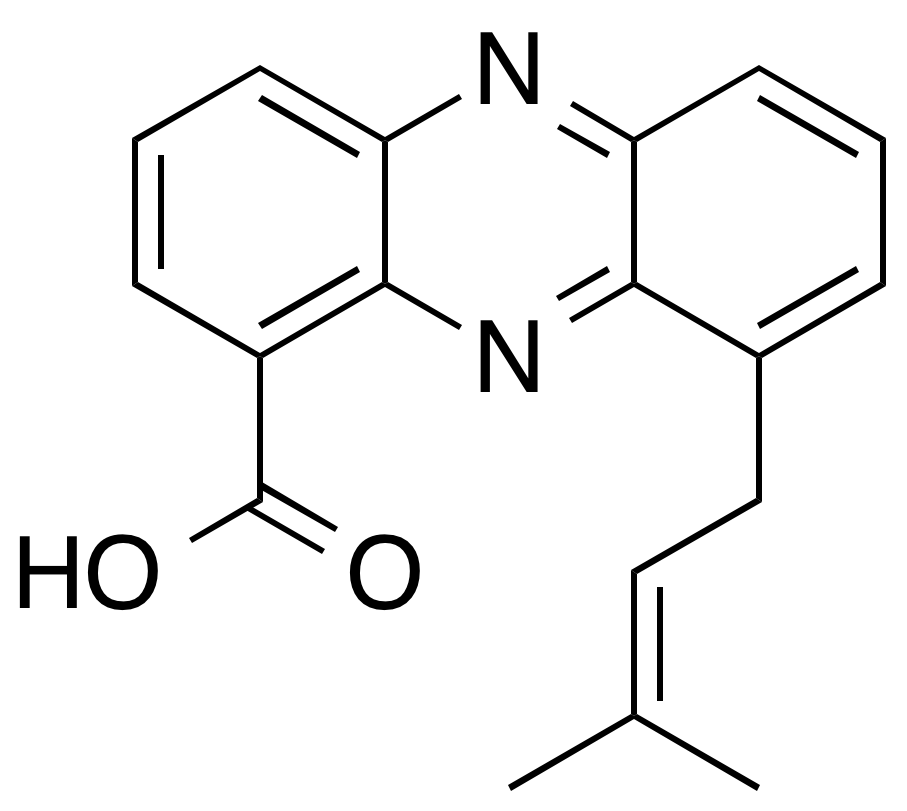

Names
- IUPAC name 9-(3-methylbut-2-enyl)phenazine-1-carboxylic acid

Identifiers
CAS Number	86125-71-5
3D model (JSmol)	Interactive image
ChEMBL	ChEMBL2071428
ChemSpider	8215539
PubChem CID	10039975
CompTox Dashboard (EPA)	DTXSID20434646
- InChI: InChI=1S/C18H16N2O2/c1-11(2)9-10-12-5-3-7-14-16(12)20-17-13(18(21)22)6-4-8-15(17)19-14/h3-9H,10H2,1-2H3,(H,21,22) Key: WLQXISHGKXGNFV-UHFFFAOYSA-N
- SMILES: CC(=CCC1=C2C(=CC=C1)N=C3C=CC=C(C3=N2)C(=O)O)C

Properties
Chemical formula	C_{18}H_{16}N_{2}O_{2}
Molar mass	292.338 g·mol^{−1}
- Except where otherwise noted, data are given for materials in their standard state (at 25 °C [77 °F], 100 kPa). Infobox references

Endophenazine A is a phenazine derivative with the molecular formula C_{18}H_{16}N_{2}O_{2} which is produced by the bacterium Streptomyces anulatus.
