= Telomestatin =

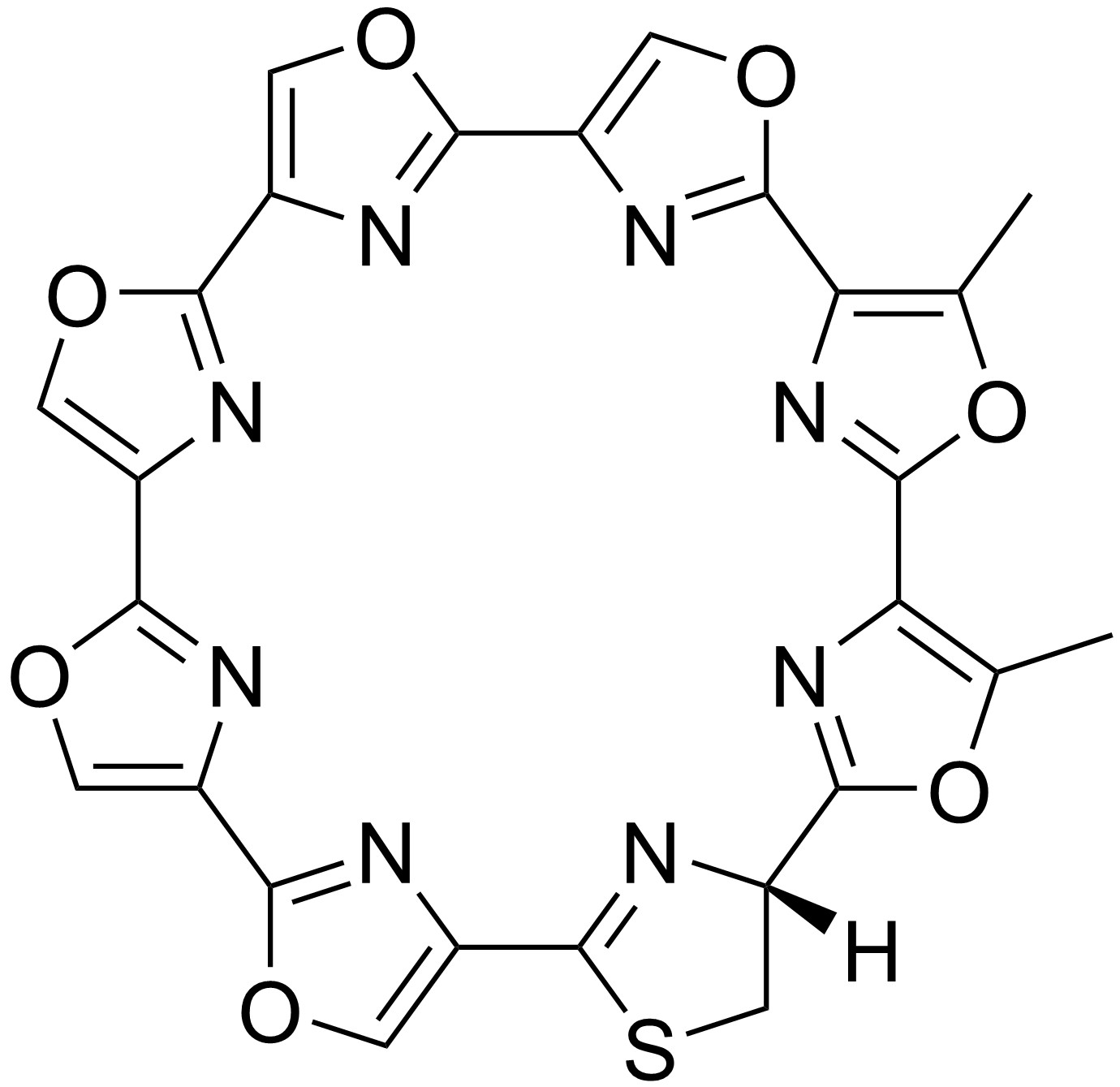

Names
- Preferred IUPAC name (8^{4}R)-6^{5},7^{5}-Dimethyl-8^{4},8^{5}-dihydro-1(2,4),2,3,4,5,6,7(4,2)-heptakis([1,3]oxazolo)-8(2,4)-[1,3]thiazolocyclooctaphane

Identifiers
CAS Number	265114-54-3
3D model (JSmol)	Interactive image
ChEBI	CHEBI:29689
ChEMBL	ChEMBL443683
ChemSpider	10128972
KEGG	C12040
PubChem CID	11954679
CompTox Dashboard (EPA)	DTXSID50474656
- InChI: InChI=1S/C26H14N8O7S/c1-9-17-24-30-14(6-39-24)21-28-12(4-37-21)19-27-11(3-35-19)20-29-13(5-36-20)22-31-15(7-38-22)26-32-16(8-42-26)23-33-18(10(2)40-23)25(34-17)41-9/h3-7,16H,8H2,1-2H3/t16-/m0/s1 Key: YVSQVYZBDXIXCC-INIZCTEOSA-N
- SMILES: CC1=C(C2=NC(C3=NC(C4=NC(C5=NC(C6=NC(C7=NC(C8=N[C@@]9([H])CS8)=CO7)=CO6)=CO5)=CO4)=CO3)=C(C)O2)N=C9O1

Properties
Chemical formula	C_{26}H_{14}N_{8}O_{7}S
Molar mass	582.51 g·mol^{−1}
- Except where otherwise noted, data are given for materials in their standard state (at 25 °C [77 °F], 100 kPa). verify (what is ?) Infobox references

Telomestatin is a macrocyclic chemical compound that acts by inhibiting the telomerase activity of in vitro cancer cells. It was first isolated from the bacteria Streptomyces anulatus. Telomestatin induces the formation of basket-type G-quadruplex (G4) structures from hybrid-type G-quadruplexes in the telomeric region. Upon formation of G4 structure there will be a decrease in the activity of the telomerase, which is involved in the replication of the telomeres and as a result the cell dies due to Hayflick type senescence.
