= Multiplex locomotive =

Steam locomotive with three or more sets of drive wheels

A multiplex locomotive is a steam locomotive that divides the driving force on its wheels by using multiple pairs of cylinders to drive multiple driving wheel set groups. Such a locomotive will necessarily articulate if it has more than two sets of driving wheels. There were locomotive projects with three, four, five or six sets of drive wheels. However, these locomotives were never built, except for four triplex locomotives in the United States and one quadruplex locomotive in Belgium.

The names of the subgroups of multiplex locomotives is derived from the number of drive wheel sets and is composed of the numeral prefix and the word locomotive. However, locomotive is often omitted if it can be inferred from the context.

== Duplex locomotives ==
Pennsylvania Railroad class T1 duplex locomotive

The terms duplex locomotive and divided drive locomotive are used to describe locomotives with two drive wheel sets mounted in a rigid frame.

The concept of the duplex locomotive originated in the early development of the compound locomotive, in which the high-pressure cylinders worked on drive wheels or drive wheel sets that were not coupled to those on which the low-pressure cylinders worked. Later, the concept was used to limit the force in the connecting rods and the hammer blow, i.e. the dynamic forces of the steam engine drive acting on the rail. This concept was used most notably by the Baldwin Locomotive Works in North America in the early 1930s. The most successful duplex locomotive of this type was the Pennsylvania Railroad's T1 class.

Articulated locomotives with two drive wheel sets were typically of the Mallet, the Garratt or the Meyer type. These types are not normally considered to be duplex locomotives.

== Triplex locomotives ==
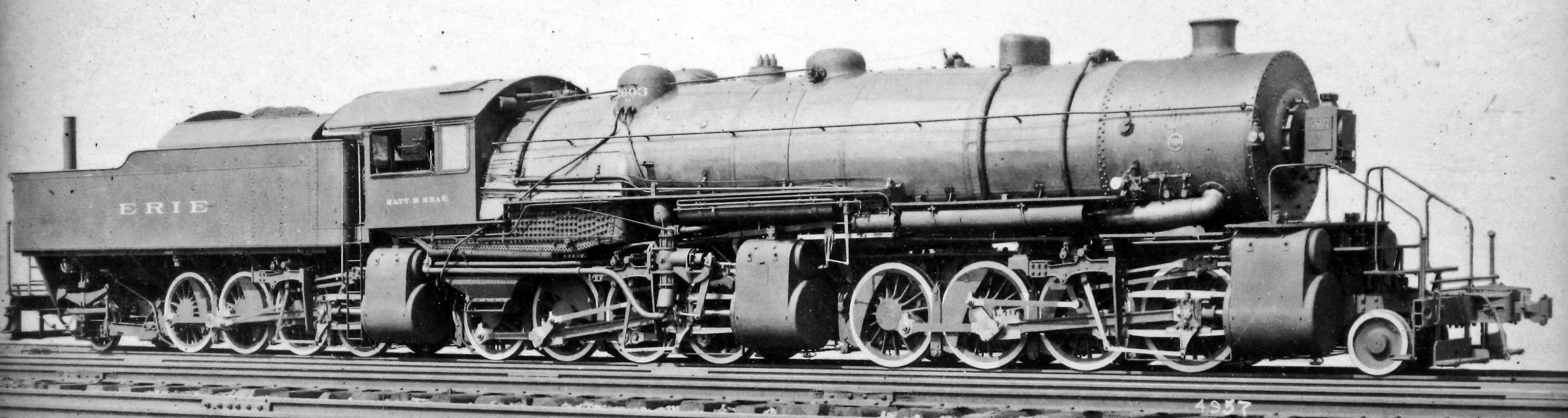
Erie Railroad Matt H. Shay 2-8-8-8-2

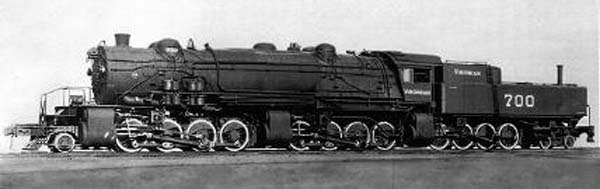
The only 2-8-8-8-4 built, for the Virginian Railway

Triplex locomotives are locomotives with three drive wheel sets. The Baldwin Locomotive Works built three 2-8-8-8-2 triplex locomotives for the Erie Railroad and one 2-8-8-8-4 for the Virginian Railway. All the triplex locomotives built were of the Mallet type, but with an extra set of driving wheels under the tender. They could only be used as slow pushers because the enormous tractive effort was too much for the car couplings to withstand, and the boiler did not produce enough steam to operate the locomotives at higher speeds. Since one of the sets of driving wheels was under the tender, it was technically a tank engine.

The triplex locomotives for the Erie Railroad were built between 1914 and 1915 and were given the classification of P-1. They were not considered successful and scrapped in 1933.

The triplex locomotive built for the Virginian Railway, as No. 700, in 1916 was given classification of XA. It was considered unsuccessful as well and was sent back to Baldwin Locomotive Works where it was taken apart in 1920 and converted into a 2-8-8-0 and a 2-8-2.

== Quadruplex locomotives ==
Quadruplex locomotives are locomotives with four drive wheel sets. There was a project by Baldwin Locomotive Works and one by Beyer, Peacock & Company for the United States, both of which were never realised. The only quadruplex locomotive built was the Belgian quadruplex SNCB 2096, which was not successful.

=== United States ===
This type of articulated locomotive was never built, although George R. Henderson was granted a patent for a such a locomotive in June 1914, which was assigned to the Baldwin Locomotive Company. The company presented the design to the Atchison, Topeka, & Santa Fe Railway (AT&SF), which showed some interest in the project.

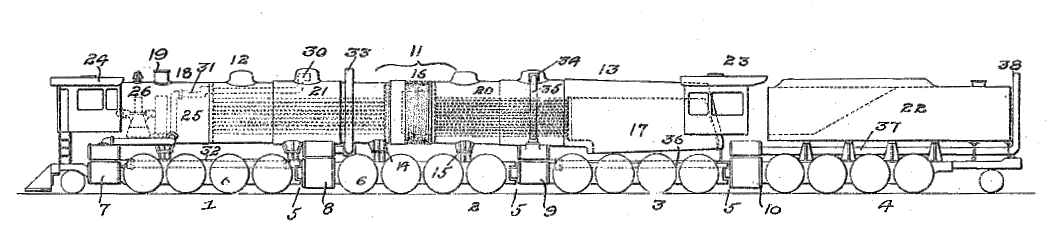
Patent application drawing for the Baldwin quadruplex locomotive, 1913

=== Belgium ===
The only quadruplex locomotive built was No. 2096 for the National Railway Company of Belgium. The locomotive, built by the Ateliers Métallurgiques de Tubize in Belgium, was the first locomotive ever with Franco-Crosti boilers. The 0-6-2+2-4-2-4-2+2-6-0 locomotive consisted of three articulated sections with a total of four engines. The middle section, with two engines with four wheels each, carried the two steam boilers, which operated at 14 bar (200 psi). They were arranged at a slight angle to allow the two fireboxes to be placed side by side in the centre.

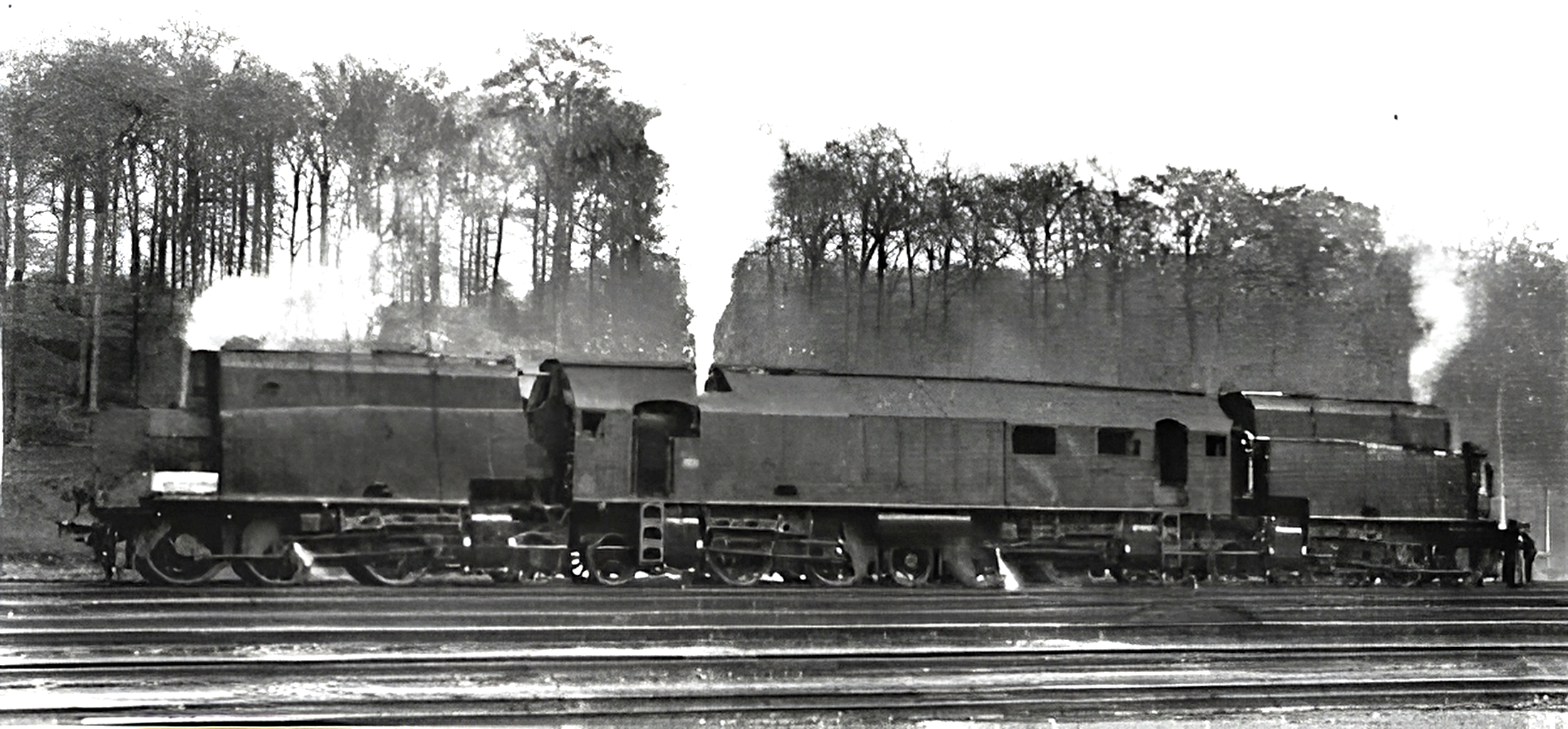
No.2096 photographed steaming on a railway track sometime before it was scrapped.
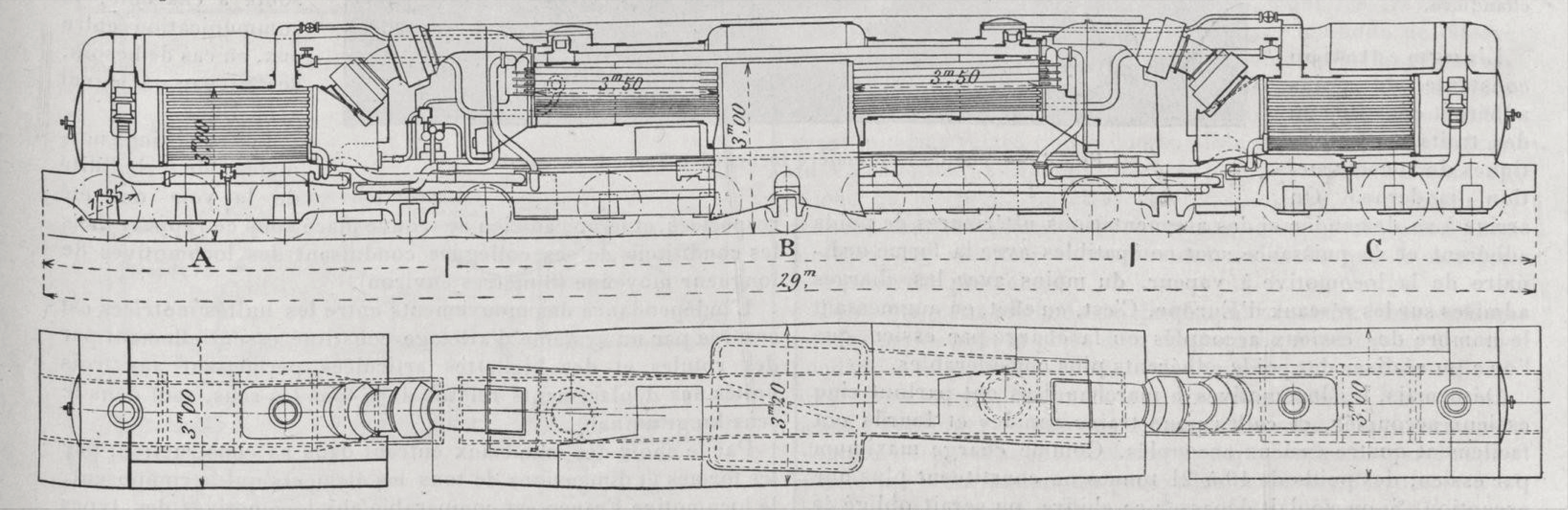
Longitudinal section and schematic drawing of the articulated locomotive system Franco-Crosti for the National Railway Company of Belgium, 1932

The two end units each carried a Franko-Crosti flue gas preheater. The connections between the boilers in the centre section and the preheaters in the end sections were expected to have problems with outside air being drawn in by leakage, so the spherical connections were designed with labyrinth seals.

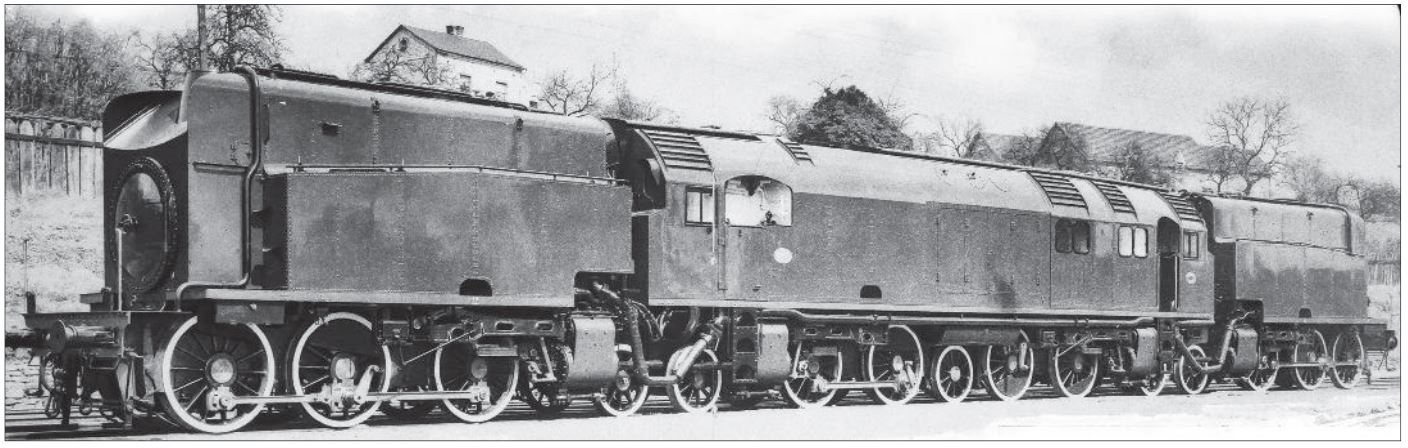
Belgian quadruplex steam locomotive No. 2096

The water tanks were also in the end sections, which were driven by six-wheel engines. All engines were single-expansion engines. The 20 drivers were supplemented by 10 idlers. The total weight of the three-part locomotive was given as 230 t (230 long tons; 250 short tons) (according to other sources 248 t (244 long tons; 273 short tons)), the adhesion weight being 164 t (161 long tons; 181 short tons).

In the middle section were two identical cabs, which were used depending on the direction of travel, as the 29 m (95 ft) (31 m (102 ft) according to other sources) long locomotive could not use turntables due to its length. Each of the two boilers had its own coal box and was operated by its own fireman. The coal boxes were located to the side of the long boilers. While one fireman could communicate directly with the driver, the other fireman's line of sight to the driver was blocked by the coal box, so communication was by audible signals only.

The locomotive was delivered in 1932, but was never actually used. The locomotive's tractive forces were so high that the chain couplers broke. The reason for building the locomotive is unclear, as it was far beyond the needs of the Belgian State Railways for freight transport, and could not be used for passenger transport due to its low top speed of 60 km/h (37 mph). The sheer size of the locomotives caused problems with stabling, the large number of coupling wheels, cylinders and seals on the movable connections between the preheaters and the main boilers were additional maintenance problems, apart from the fact that the locomotive required two firemen instead of one. The locomotive was exhibited at the 1935 Brussels World's Fair and was retired shortly afterwards. Some believe that the locomotive was built as a proof of concept for the project of a larger hexaplex locomotive with the same body for the Russian market.

=== Super-Garratt ===
Beyer, Peacock and Company also applied for a patent for a quadruplex locomotive in 1927. Based on their successful Garratt locomotive design, it was called the Super-Garratt. The standard-gauge locomotive was designed as an articulated 2-6-6-2+2-6-6-2 for the North American railroads and would have been built in conjunction with the American Locomotive Company (ALCo). The starting tractive force of 200,000 pounds-force (890 kN) of the 460-ton locomotive would probably have been at the limit of the couplers in use at the time. Like a Garratt locomotive, it had a centre frame with boiler, firebox and cab, which sat on two subframes at each end. Each subframe, like a Mallett locomotive, contained a fixed set of driving wheels and, at the end of the locomotive, a pivoting bogie with another set of driving wheels. In addition to the standard-gauge version, a 3 ft 6 in (1,067 mm) version was planned for the South African Railways (SAR), but neither version was built.

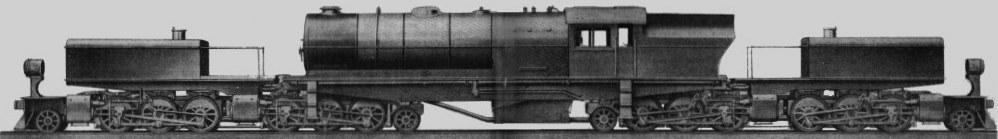
Rendering of a Super Garratt locomotive
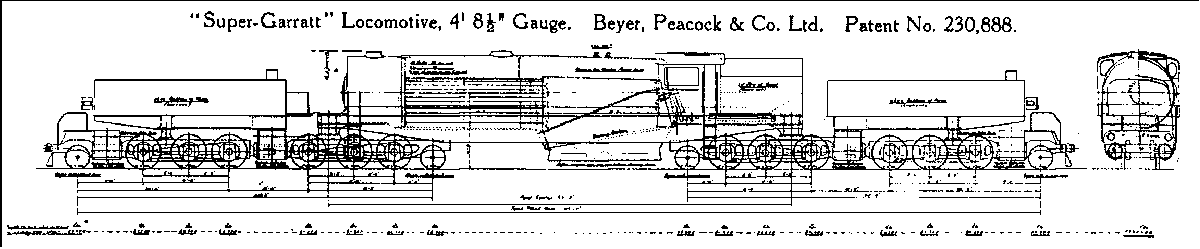
Side view of a standard-gauge Super Garratt locomotive

== Quintuplex locomotives ==
A quintuplex version (2-8-8-8-8-8-2) was also included in the George R. Henderson's U.S. patent application for the quadruplex version. The design was based on the quadruplex, with the fourth and fifth engines under an extended, articulated tender.

An even larger 2-10-10-10-10-10-2 variant appeared as an artist's impression in the August 1951 issue of Trains magazine. However, this idea seems to be speculative on the part of both the magazine writer and the artist, perhaps because AT&SF already had a fleet of 2-10-10-2’s in 1913. There is no evidence that either George Henderson or Baldwin suggested such a version.

== Hexaplex locomotive ==
There was a Belgian project for a hexaplex locomotive for the Russian market, based on the Franco-Crosti quadruplex locomotive built for the Belgian State Railways. It had the wheel arrangement 2-4-4-2+2-8-8-2+2-4-4-2 and made full use of the Russian loading gauge and broad gauge. The total weight of the 43 m (141 ft) long locomotive was to be 410 t (400 long tons; 450 short tons), of which about 320 t (310 long tons; 350 short tons) would have been available for adhesion. The water tank capacity was to be 60,000 L (13,000 imp gal; 16,000 US gal), the coal capacity 15 t (15 long tons; 17 short tons).

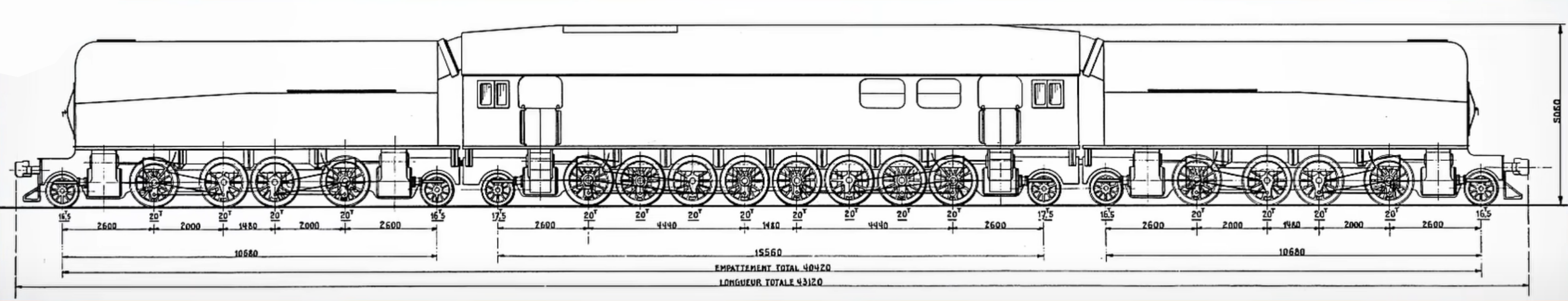
Longitudinal section and schematic drawing of the hexaplex locomotive system Franco-Crosti for the Russian market, 1930s

== Bibliography ==
- US 1629369 Triple-expansion mallet locomotive. by Samuel M. Vauclain assigned to the Baldwin Locomotive Works filed on November 25, 1925
- US 1100563 Locomotive. by George R. Henderson assigned to the Baldwin Locomotive Works filed on December 11, 1913 describing multiplex locomotives with jointed-boilers
