= G-quadruplex =

Structure in molecular biology

Structure of a G-quadruplex. Left: a G-tetrad. Right: an intramolecular G4 complex.

In molecular biology, G-quadruplex secondary structures (G4) are formed in nucleic acids by sequences that are rich in guanine. They are helical in shape and contain guanine tetrads that can form from one, two or four strands. The unimolecular forms often occur naturally near the ends of the chromosomes, better known as the telomeric regions, and in transcriptional regulatory regions of multiple genes, both in microbes and across vertebrates including oncogenes in humans. Four guanine bases can associate through Hoogsteen hydrogen bonding to form a square planar structure called a guanine tetrad (G-tetrad or G-quartet), and two or more guanine tetrads (from G-tracts, continuous runs of guanine) can stack on top of each other to form a G-quadruplex.

The placement and bonding to form G-quadruplexes is not random and serve very unusual functional purposes. The quadruplex structure is further stabilized by the presence of a cation, especially potassium, which sits in a central channel between each pair of tetrads. They can be formed of DNA, RNA, LNA, and PNA, and may be intramolecular, bimolecular, or tetramolecular. Depending on the direction of the strands or parts of a strand that form the tetrads, structures may be described as parallel or antiparallel. G-quadruplex structures can be computationally predicted from DNA or RNA sequence motifs, but their actual structures can be quite varied within and between the motifs, which can number over 100,000 per genome. Their activities in basic genetic processes are an active area of research in telomere, gene regulation, and functional genomics research.

== History ==
The identification of structures with a high guanine association became apparent in the early 1960s, through the identification of gel-like substances associated with guanines. More specifically, this research detailed the four-stranded DNA structures with a high association of guanines, which was later identified in eukaryotic telomeric regions of DNA in the 1980s. The importance of discovering G-quadruplex structure was described through the statement, "If G-quadruplexes form so readily in vitro, Nature will have found a way of using them in vivo" - Aaron Klug, Nobel Prize Winner in Chemistry (1982). Interest in in vivo function of G-quadruplexes surged after large scale genome-wide analysis showed the prevalence of potential G-quadruplex (pG4)-forming sequences within gene promoters of human, chimpanzee, mouse, and rat - presented in the First International G-quadruplex Meeting held in April 2007 in Louisville, Kentucky. In 2006, the prevalence of G-quadruplexes within gene promoters of several bacterial genomes was reported predicting G-quadruplex-mediated gene regulation. With the abundance of G-quadruplexes in vivo, these structures hold a biologically relevant role through interactions with the promoter regions of oncogenes and the telomeric regions of DNA strands. Current research consists of identifying the biological function of these G-Quadruplex structures for specific oncogenes and discovering effective therapeutic treatments for cancer based on interactions with G-quadruplexes. Early evidence for the formation of G-quadruplexes in vivo in cells was established by isolating them from cells, and later by the observation that specific DNA helicases could be identified where small molecules specific for these DNA structures accumulated in cells.

3D Structure of the intramolecular human telomeric G-quadruplex in potassium solution. The backbone is represented by a tube. The center of this structure contains three layers of G-tetrads. The hydrogen bonds in these layers are represented by blue dashed lines. (PDB: 2HY9)

== Topology ==
The length of the nucleic acid sequences involved in tetrad formation determines how the quadruplex folds. Short sequences, consisting of only a single contiguous run of three or more guanine bases, require four individual strands to form a quadruplex. Such a quadruplex is described as tetramolecular, reflecting the requirement of four separate strands. The term G4 DNA was originally reserved for these tetramolecular structures that might play a role in meiosis. However, as currently used in molecular biology, the term G4 can mean G-quadruplexes of any molecularity. Longer sequences, which contain two contiguous runs of three or more guanine bases, where the guanine regions are separated by one or more bases, only require two such sequences to provide enough guanine bases to form a quadruplex. These structures, formed from two separate G-rich strands, are termed bimolecular quadruplexes. Finally, sequences which contain four distinct runs of guanine bases can form stable quadruplex structures by themselves, and a quadruplex formed entirely from a single strand is called an intramolecular quadruplex.

Depending on how the individual runs of guanine bases are arranged in a bimolecular or intramolecular quadruplex, a quadruplex can adopt one of a number of topologies with varying loop configurations. If all strands of DNA proceed in the same direction, the quadruplex is termed parallel. For intramolecular quadruplexes, this means that any loop regions present must be of the propeller type, positioned to the sides of the quadruplex. If one or more of the runs of guanine bases has a 5'-3' direction opposite to the other runs of guanine bases, the quadruplex is said to have adopted an antiparallel topology. The loops joining runs of guanine bases in intramolecular antiparallel quadruplexes are either diagonal, joining two diagonally opposite runs of guanine bases, or lateral (edgewise) type loops, joining two adjacent runs of guanine base pairs.

In quadruplexes formed from double-stranded DNA, possible interstrand topologies have also been discussed . Interstrand quadruplexes contain guanines that originate from both strands of dsDNA.

== Structure and functional role in genome ==
Following sequencing of the human genome, many guanine-rich sequences that had the potential to form quadruplexes were discovered. Depending on cell type and cell cycle, mediating factors such as DNA-binding proteins on chromatin, composed of DNA tightly wound around histone proteins, and other environmental conditions and stresses affect the dynamic formation of quadruplexes. For instance, quantitative assessments of the thermodynamics of molecular crowding indicate that the antiparallel g-quadruplex is stabilized by molecular crowding. This effect seems to be mediated by alteration of the hydration of the DNA and its effect on Hoogsteen base pair bonding. These quadruplexes seemed to readily occur at the ends of chromosome. In addition, the propensity of g-quadruplex formation during transcription in RNA sequences with the potential to form mutually exclusive hairpin or G-quadruplex structures depends heavily on the position of the hairpin-forming sequence.

Because repair enzymes would naturally recognize ends of linear chromosomes as damaged DNA and would process them as such to harmful effect for the cell, clear signaling and tight regulation is needed at the ends of linear chromosomes. Telomeres function to provide this signaling. Telomeres, rich in guanine and with a propensity to form g-quadruplexes, are located at the terminal ends of chromosomes and help maintain genome integrity by protecting these vulnerable terminal ends from instability.

These telomeric regions are characterized by long regions of double-stranded CCCTAA:TTAGGG repeats. The repeats end with a 3' protrusion of between 10 and 50 single-stranded TTAGGG repeats. The heterodimeric complex ribonucleoprotein enzyme telomerase adds TTAGGG repeats at the 3' end of DNA strands. At these 3' end protrusions, the G-rich overhang can form secondary structures such as G-quadruplexes if the overhang is longer than four TTAGGG repeats. The presence of these structures prevent telomere elongation by the telomerase complex.

== Telomeric quadruplexes ==
Telomeric repeats in a variety of organisms have been shown to form these quadruplex structures in vitro, and subsequently they have also been shown to form in vivo. The human telomeric repeat (which is the same for all vertebrates) consists of many repeats of the sequenced (TTAGGG), and the quadruplexes formed by this structure can be in bead-like structures of 5 nm to 8 nm in size and have been well studied by NMR, TEM and X-ray crystal structure determination. The formation of these quadruplexes in telomeres has been shown to decrease the activity of the enzyme telomerase, which is responsible for maintaining length of telomeres and is involved in around 85% of all cancers. This is an active target of drug discovery, including telomestatin.

== Non-telomeric quadruplexes ==
Quadruplexes are present in locations other than at the telomere. Analysis of human, chimpanzee, mouse and rat genomes showed enormous number of potential G-quadruplex (pG4)-forming sequences in non-telomeric regions. A large number of the non-telomeric G-quadruplexes were found within gene promoters, and were conserved across the species. Similarly, large number of G-quadruplexes were found in the E. coli and hundreds of other microbial genomes. Here also, like vertebrates G-quadruplexes were enriched within gene promoters. In addition, there was found more than one-billion-year conserved G-quadruplex locus in plants and algae, in gene encoding large subunit of RNA polymerase II. Although these studies predicted G-quadruplex-mediated gene regulation, it is unlikely that all pG4s would form in vivo. The proto-oncogene c-myc forms a quadruplex in a nuclease hypersensitive region critical for gene activity. Other genes shown to form G-quadruplexes in their promoter regions include the chicken β-globin gene, human ubiquitin-ligase RFP2, and the proto-oncogenes c-kit, bcl-2, VEGF, H-ras and N-ras.

Genome-wide surveys based on a quadruplex folding rule have been performed, which have identified 376,000 Putative Quadruplex Sequences (PQS) in the human genome, although not all of these probably form in vivo. A similar studies have identified putative G-quadruplexes in prokaryotes, namely the bacterium E. coli. There are several possible models for how quadruplexes could influence gene activity, either by upregulation or downregulation. One model is shown below, with G-quadruplex formation in or near a promoter blocking transcription of the gene, and hence de-activating it. In another model, quadruplex formed at the non-coding DNA strand helps to maintain an open conformation of the coding DNA strand and enhance an expression of the respective gene.

== Function ==
It has been suggested that quadruplex formation plays a role in immunoglobulin heavy chain switching. As cells have evolved mechanisms for resolving (i.e., unwinding) quadruplexes that form. Quadruplex formation may be potentially damaging for a cell; the helicases WRN and Bloom syndrome protein have a high affinity for resolving DNA G-quadruplexes. The DEAH/RHA helicase, DHX36, has also been identified as a key G-quadruplex resolvase. In 2009, a metastasis suppressor protein NM23H2 (also known as NME2) was found to directly interact with G-quadruplex in the promoter of the c-myc gene, and transcriptionally regulate c-myc. More recently, NM23H2 was reported to interact with G-quadruplex in the promoter of the human telomerase (hTERT) gene and regulate hTERT expression In 2019, the telomere-binding-factor-2 (TRF2 or TERF2) was shown to bind to thousands of non-telomeric G-quadruplexes in the human genome by TRF2 ChIP-seq. There are many studies that implicate quadruplexes in both positive and negative transcriptional regulation, including epigenetic regulation of genes like hTERT. Function of G-quadruplexes have also been reported in allowing programmed recombination of immunologlobin heavy genes and the pilin antigenic variation system of the pathogenic Neisseria. The roles of quadruplex structure in translation control are not as well explored. The direct visualization of G-quadruplex structures in human cells as well as the co-crystal structure of an RNA helicase bound to a G-quadruplex have provided important confirmations of their relevance to cell biology. The potential positive and negative roles of quadruplexes in telomere replication and function remains controversial. T-loops and G-quadruplexes are described as the two tertiary DNA structures that protect telomere ends and regulate telomere length.

== Genome Regulation through formation of G-quadruplex structures ==
Many of the genome regulatory processes have been linked to the formation of G-quadruplex structures, attributable to the huge role it plays in DNA repair of apurinic/apyrimidinic sites also known as AP sites. A new technique to map AP sites has been developed known as AP-seq which utilizes a biotin-labeled aldehyde-reactive probe (ARP) to tag certain regions of the genome where AP site damage occurrence has been significant. Another genome-wide mapping sequencing method known as ChIP-sequencing, was utilized to map both; damage in AP sites, and the enzyme responsible for its repair, AP endonuclease 1 (APE1). Both of these genome-wide mapping sequencing methods, ChIP-sequencing and ARP, have indicated that AP site damage occurrence is nonrandom. AP site damage was also more prevalent in certain regions of the genome that contain specific active promoter and enhancer markers, some of which were linked to regions responsible for lung adenocarcinoma and colon cancer. AP site damage was found to be predominant in PQS regions of the genome, where formation of G-quadruplex structures is regulated and promoted by the DNA repair process, base excision repair (BER). Base excision repair processes in cells have been proved to be reduced with aging as its components in the mitochondria begin to decline, which can lead to the formation of many diseases such as Alzheimer's disease (AD). These G-quadruplex structures are said to be formed in the promoter regions of DNA through superhelicity, which favors the unwinding of the double helical structure of DNA and in turn loops the strands to form G-quadruplex structures in guanine rich regions. The BER pathway is signalled when it indicates an oxidative DNA base damage, where structures like, 8-Oxoguanine-DNA glycosylase 1 (OGG1), APE1 and G-quadruplex play a huge role in its repair. These enzymes participate in BER to repair certain DNA lesions such as 7,8-dihydro-8-oxoguanine (8-oxoG), which forms under oxidative stress to guanine bases.

=== Role of Endogenous Oxidized DNA Base Damage on G4 formation ===
Guanine (G) bases in G-quadruplex have the lowest redox potential causing it to be more susceptible to the formation of 8-oxoguanine (8-oxoG), an endogenous oxidized DNA base damage in the genome. Due to Guanine having a lower electron reduction potential than the other nucleotides bases,8-oxo-2'-deoxyguanosine (8-oxo-dG), is a known major product of DNA oxidation. Its concentration is used as a measurement of oxidative stress within a cell. When DNA undergoes oxidative damage, a possible structural change in guanine, after ionizing radiation, gives rise to an enol form, 8-OH-Gua. This oxidative product is formed through a tautomeric shift from the original damage guanine, 8-oxo-Gua, and represents DNA damage that causes changes in the structure. This form allows for the base excision repair (BER) enzyme OGG1 to bind and remove the oxidative damage with the help of APE1, resulting in an AP site. Moreover, an AP site is a location in DNA that has neither a purine or a pyrimidine base due to DNA damage, they are the most prevalent type of endogenous DNA damage in cells. AP sites can be generated spontaneously or after the cleavage of modified bases, like 8-OH-Gua. The generation of an AP site enables the melting of the duplex DNA to unmask the PQS, adopting a G-quadruplex fold. With the use of genome-wide ChIP-sequencing analyses, cell-based assays, and in vitro biochemical analyses, a connection has been made between oxidized DNA base-derived AP sites, and the formation of the G-quadruplex.

DNA Oxidation Contribution to Diseases

Furthermore, the concentration of 8-oxo-dG is a known biomarker of oxidative stress within a cell, and excessive amount of oxidative stress has been linked to carcinogenesis and other diseases. When produced, 8-oxo-dG, has the ability to inactivate OGG1, thus preventing the repair of DNA damage caused by the oxidation of guanine. The possible inactivation allows for un-repaired DNA damages to gather in non-replicating cells, like muscle, and can cause aging as well. Moreover, oxidative DNA damage like 8-oxo-dG contributes to carcinogenesis through the modulation of gene expression, or the induction of mutations. On the condition that 8-oxo-dG is repaired by BER, parts of the repair protein is left behind which can lead to epigenetic alterations, or the modulation of gene expression. Upon insertion of 8-oxo-dG into thymidine kinase gene of humans, it was determine that if 8-oxo-dG was left unchecked and not repaired by BER, it can lead to frequent mutations and eventually carcinogenesis.

=== APE1 role in Gene Regulation ===
AP endonuclease 1 (APE1) is an enzyme responsible for the promotion and the formation of G-quadruplex structures. APE1 is mainly in charge of repairing damage caused to AP sites through the BER pathway. APE1 is considered to be very crucial as AP site damage is known to be the most recurring type of endogenous damage to DNA. The oxidation of certain purine bases, like guanine, forms oxidized nucleotides that impairs DNA function by mismatching nucleotides in the sequences. This is more common in PQS sequences which form oxidized structures, such as 8-oxoguanine. Once the cell is aware of oxidative stress and damage, it recruits OGG1 to the site, whose main function is to initiate the BER pathway. OGG1 does so by cleaving the oxidized base and thus creating an AP site, primarily through the process of negative superhelicity. This AP site then signals cells to engage APE1 binding, which binds to the open duplex region. The binding of APE1 then plays an important role by stabilizing the formation of G-quadruplex structures in that region. This promotes formation of G-quadruplex structures by the folding of the stand. This looping process brings four bases in close proximity that will be held together by Hoogsteen base pairing. After this stage the APE1 gets acetylated by multiple lysine residues on the chromatin, forming acetylated APE1 (AcAPE1). AcAPE1 is very crucial to the BER pathway as it acts as a transcriptional coactivator or corepressor, functioning to load transcription factors (TF) into the site of damage allowing it to regulate the gene expression. AcAPE1 is also very important since it allows APE1 to bind for longer periods of time by delay of its dissociation from the sequence, allowing the repair process to be more efficient. Deacetylation of AcAPE1 is the driving force behind the loading of these TFs, where APE1 dissociates from the G-quadruplex structures. When a study downregulated the presence of APE1 and AcAPE1 in the cell, the formation of G-quadruplex structures was inhibited, which proves the importance of APE1 for the formation of these structures. However, not all G-quadruplex structures require APE1 for formation, in fact some of them formed greater G-quadruplex structures in its absence. Therefore, we can conclude that APE1 has two important roles in genome regulation- Stabilizing the formation of g-quadruplex structures and loading the transcriptional factors onto the AP site

== Cancer ==
=== Telomeres ===
G-quadruplex forming sequences are prevalent in eukaryotic cells, especially in telomeres, 5` untranslated strands, and translocation hot spots. G-quadruplexes can inhibit normal cell function, and in healthy cells, are easily and readily unwound by helicase. However, in cancer cells that have mutated helicase these complexes cannot be unwound and leads to potential damage of the cell. This causes replication of damaged and cancerous cells. For therapeutic advances, stabilizing the G-quadruplexes of cancerous cells can inhibit cell growth and replication leading to the cell's death.

=== Promoter Regions ===
Along with the association of G-quadruplexes in telomeric regions of DNA, G-quadruplex structures have been identified in various human proto-oncogene promoter regions. The structures most present in the promoter regions of these oncogenes tend to be parallel-stranded G-quadruplex DNA structures. Some of these oncogenes include c-KIT, PDGF-A, c-Myc and VEGF, showing the importance of this secondary structure in cancer growth and development. While the formation of G-quadruplex structure vary to some extent for the different promoter regions of oncogenes, the consistent stabilization of these structures have been found in cancer development. Current therapeutic research actively focuses on targeting this stabilization of G-quadruplex structures to arrest unregulated cell growth and division.

One particular gene region, the c-myc pathway, plays an integral role in the regulation of a protein product, c-Myc. With this product, the c-Myc protein functions in the processes of apoptosis and cell growth or development and as a transcriptional control on human telomerase reverse transcriptase. Interaction of c-Myc promoter G-quadruplex with NM23H2 was shown to regulate c-Myc in cancer cells in 2009

Regulation of c-myc through Human telomerase reverse transcriptase (hTERT) is also directly regulated through promoter G-quadruplex by interaction with the transcription factor NM23H2 where epigenetic modifications were dependent on NM23H2-G-quadruplex association. Recently, hTERT epigenetic regulation reported to be mediated through interaction of hTERT promoter G-quadruplex with the telomeric factor TRF2.

Another gene pathway deals with the VEGF gene, Vascular Endothelial Growth Factor, which remains involved in the process of angiogenesis or the formation of new blood vessels. The formation of an intramolecular G-quadruplex structure has been shown through studies on the polypurine tract of the promoter region of the VEGF gene. Through recent research on the role of G-quadruplex function in vivo, the stabilization of G-quadruplex structures was shown to regulate VEGF gene transcription, with inhibition of transcription factors in this pathway. The intramolecular G-quadruplex structures are formed mostly through the abundant guanine sequence in the promoter region of this specific pathway. The cyclin-dependent cell cycle checkpoint kinase inhibitor-1 CDKN1A (also known as p21) gene harbours promoter G-quadruplex. Interaction of this G-quadruplex with TRF2 (also known as TERF2) resulted in epigenetic regulation of p21, which was tested using the G-quadruplex-binding ligand 360A.

Hypoxia inducible factor 1ɑ, HIF-1ɑ, remains involved in cancer signaling through its binding to Hypoxia Response Element, HRE, in the presence of hypoxia to begin the process of angiogenesis. Through recent research into this specific gene pathway, the polypurine and polypyrimidine region allows for the transcription of this specific gene and the formation of an intramolecular G-quadruplex structure. However, more research is necessary to determine whether the formation of G-quadruplex regulates the expression of this gene in a positive or negative manner.

The c-kit oncogene deals with a pathway that encodes an RTK, which was shown to have elevated expression levels in certain types of cancer. The rich guanine sequence of this promoter region has shown the ability to form a variety of quadruplexes. Current research on this pathway is focusing on discovering the biological function of this specific quadruplex formation on the c-kit pathway, while this quadruplex sequence has been noticed in various species.

The RET oncogene functions in the transcription of kinase which has been abundant in certain types of cancer. The guanine rich sequence in the promoter region for this pathway exudes a necessity for baseline transcription of this receptor tyrosine kinase. In certain types of cancers, the RET protein has shown increased expression levels. The research on this pathway suggested the formation of a G-quadruplex in the promoter region and an applicable target for therapeutic treatments.

Another oncogene pathway involving PDGF-A, platelet-derived growth factor, involves the process of wound healing and function as mitogenic growth factors for cells. High levels of expression of PDGF have been associated with increased cell growth and cancer. The presence of a guanine-rich sequence in the promoter region of PDGF-A has exhibited the ability to form intramolecular parallel G-quadruplex structures and remains suggested to play a role in transcriptional regulation of PDGF-A. However, research has also identified the presence of G-quadruplex structures within this region due to the interaction of TMPyP4 with this promoter sequence.

=== Therapeutics ===
Telomeres are generally made up of G-quadruplexes and remain important targets for therapeutic research and discoveries. These complexes have a high affinity for porphyrin rings which makes them effective anticancer agents. However, TMPyP4 has been limited for used due to its non-selectivity toward cancer cell telomeres and normal double stranded DNA (dsDNA). To address this issue analog of TMPyP4, it was synthesized known as 5Me which targets only G quadruplex DNA which inhibits cancer growth more effectively than TMPyP4.

Ligand design and development remains an important field of research into therapeutic reagents due to the abundance of G-quadruplexes and their multiple conformational differences. One type of ligand involving a Quindoline derivative, SYUIQ-05, utilizes the stabilization of G-quadruplexes in promoter regions to inhibit the production of both the c-Myc protein product and the human telomerase reverse transcriptase (hTERT). This main pathway of targeting this region results in the lack of telomerase elongation, leading to arrested cell development. Further research remains necessary for the discovery of a single gene target to minimize unwanted reactivity with more efficient antitumor activity.

== Ligands which bind quadruplexes ==
One way of inducing or stabilizing G-quadruplex formation is to introduce a molecule which can bind to the G-quadruplex structure. A number of ligands, which can be both small molecules and proteins, can bind to the G-quadruplex. These ligands can be naturally occurring or synthetic. This has become an increasingly large field of research in genetics, biochemistry, and pharmacology.

Cationic porphyrins have been shown to bind intercalatively with G-quadruplexes, as well as the molecule telomestatin.

The binding of ligands to G-quadruplexes is vital for anti-cancer pursuits because G-quadruplexes are found typically at translocation hot spots. MM41, a ligand that binds selectively for a quadruplex on the BCL-2 promoter, is shaped with a central core and 4 side chains branching sterically out. The shape of the ligand is vital because it closely matches the quadruplex which has stacked quartets and the loops of nucleic acids holding it together. When bound, MM41's central chromophore is situated on top of the 3' terminal G-quartet and the side chains of the ligand associate to the loops of the quadruplex. The quartet and the chromophore are bound with a π-π bond while the side chains and loops are not bound but are in close proximity. What makes this binding strong is the fluidity in the position of the loops to better associate with the ligand side chains.

TMPyP4, a cationic porphyrin, is a more well known G4 binding ligand that helps to repress c-Myc. The way in which TMPyP4 binds to G4's is similar to MM41, with the ring stacking onto the external G-quartet and side chains associating to the loops of G4's.

When designing ligands to be bound to G-quadruplexes, the ligands have a higher affinity for parallel folded G-quadruplexes. It has been found that ligands with smaller side chains bind better to the quadruplex because smaller ligands have more concentrated electron density. Furthermore, the hydrogen bonds of ligands with smaller side chains are shorter and therefore stronger. Ligands with mobile side chains, ones that are able to rotate around its center chromophore, associate more strongly to G-quadruplexes because conformation of the G4 loops and the ligand side chains can align.

== Quadruplex prediction techniques ==
Identifying and predicting sequences which have the capacity to form quadruplexes is an important tool in further understanding their role. Generally, a simple pattern match is used for searching for possible intrastrand quadruplex forming sequences: d(G_{3+}N_{1-7}G_{3+}N_{1-7}G_{3+}N_{1-7}G_{3+}), where N is any nucleotide base (including guanine). This rule has been widely used in on-line algorithms. Although the rule effectively identifies sites of G-quadruplex formation, it also identifies a subset of the imperfect homopurine mirror repeats capable of triplex formation and C-strand i-motif formation. Moreover, these sequences also have the capacity to form slipped and foldback structures that are implicit intermediates in the formation of both quadruplex and triplex DNA structures. In one study, it was found that the observed number per base pair (i.e. the frequency) of these motifs has increased rapidly in the eumetazoa for which complete genomic sequences are available. This suggests that the sequences may be under positive selection enabled by the evolution of systems capable of suppressing non-B structure formation.

More recently, advanced web-based toolboxes for identifying G-quadruplex forming sequences were developed, including user-friendly and open access version of G4Hunter based on sliding window approach or G4RNA Screener based on machine learning algorithm.

== Methods for studying G-quadruplexes ==
A number of experimental methods have been developed to identify G-quadruplexes. These methods can be broadly defined into two classes: biophysical and biochemical methods.

=== Biochemical methods ===
Biochemical techniques were employed to interrogate G-quadruplex formation in a longer sequence context. In the DNA polymerase stop assay, the formation of a G-quadruplex in a DNA template can act as a roadblock and cause polymerase stalling, which halts the primer extension. The dimethyl sulfate (DMS) followed by the piperidine cleavage assay is based on the fact that the formation of a G-quadruplex will prohibit the N7 guanine methylation caused by DMS, leading to a protection pattern observed at the DNA G-quadruplex region after piperidine cleavage.

=== Biophysical methods ===
The topology of the G-quadruplex structure can be determined by monitoring the positive or negative circular dichroism (CD) signals at specific wavelengths. Parallel G-quadruplexes have negative and positive CD signals at 240 and 262 nm, respectively, whereas antiparallel G-quadruplexes place these signals at 262 and 295 nm, respectively. To verify G-quadruplex formation, one should also perform the CD experiments under non-G-quadruplex stabilizing (Li+) and G-quadruplex stabilizing conditions (such as K+ or with G-quadruplex ligands), and scan toward the far-UV region (180–230 nm).

The thermostability of the G-quadruplex structure can be identified by observing the UV signal at 295 nm. Upon G-quadruplex melting, the UV absorbance at 295 nm decreases, leading to a hypochromic shift that is a distinctive feature of G-quadruplex structure.

As the quantum yields of the intrinsic G-quadruplex fluorescence are higher compared to those of the constitutive single strands, their formation or their melting can be detected by monitoring their emission. The intensity changes obseved upon excitation at 295 nm (see above) renders this method particularly sensitive.

Another approach for detection of G-quadruplexes includes nanopore-based methods. Firstly, it was shown that biological nanopores can detect G-quadruplexes based on size exclusion and specific interaction of G-quadruplex and protein nanocavity. The novel approach combines solid-state nanopores and DNA nanotechnology for label-free detection of G-quadruplexes, for their mapping on dsDNA, and for monitoring G-quadruplex formation.

== Role in neurological disorders ==
G-quadruplexes have been implicated in neurological disorders through two main mechanisms. The first is through expansions of G-repeats within genes that lead to the formation of G-quadruplex structures that directly cause disease, as is the case with the C9orf72 gene and amyotrophic lateral sclerosis (ALS) or frontotemporal dementia (FTD). The second mechanism is through mutations that affect the expression of G-quadruplex binding proteins, as seen in the fragile X mental retardation gene 1 (FMR1) gene and Fragile X Syndrome.

The C9orf72 gene codes for the protein C9orf72 which is found throughout the brain in neuronal cytoplasm and at presynaptic terminals. Mutations of the C9orf72 gene have been linked to the development of FTD and ALS. These two diseases have a causal relationship to GGGGCC (G_{4}C_{2}) repeats within the 1st intron of C9orf72 gene. Normal individuals typically have around 2 to 8 G_{4}C_{2} repeats, but individuals with FTD or ALS have from 500 to several thousand G_{4}C_{2} repeats. The transcribed RNA of these repeats have been shown to form stable G-quadruplexes, with evidence showing that the G_{4}C_{2} repeats in DNA have the ability to form mixed parallel-antiparallel G-quadruplex structures as well. These RNA transcripts containing G_{4}C_{2} repeats were shown to bind and separate a wide variety of proteins, including nucleolin. Nucleolin is involved in the synthesis and maturation of ribosomes within the nucleus, and separation of nucleolin by the mutated RNA transcripts impairs nucleolar function and ribosomal RNA synthesis.

Fragile X mental retardation protein (FMRP) is a widely expressed protein coded by the FMR1 gene that binds to G-quadruplex secondary structures in neurons and is involved in synaptic plasticity. FMRP acts as a negative regulator of translation, and its binding stabilizes G-quadruplex structures in mRNA transcripts, inhibiting ribosome elongation of mRNA in the neuron's dendrite and controlling the timing of the transcript's expression. Mutations of this gene can cause the development of Fragile X Syndrome, autism, and other neurological disorders. Specifically, Fragile X Syndrome is caused by an increase from 50 to over 200 CGG repeats within exon 13 of the FMR1 gene. This repeat expansion promotes DNA methylation and other epigenetic heterochromatin modifications of FMR1 that prevent the transcription of the gene, leading to pathological low levels of FMRP.

== Therapeutic approaches ==
=== Antisense-mediated interventions ===
Antisense-mediated interventions and small-molecule ligands are common strategies used to target neurological diseases linked to G-quadruplex expansion repeats. Therefore, these techniques are especially advantageous for targeting neurological diseases that have a gain-of-function mechanism, which is when the altered gene product has a new function or new expression of a gene; this has been detected in the C9orf72 (chromosome 9 open reading frame 72).

Antisense therapy is the process by which synthesized strands of nucleic acids are used to bind directly and specifically to the mRNA produced by a certain gene, which will inactivate it. Antisense oligonucleotides (ASOs) are commonly used to target C9orf72 RNA of the G-quadruplex GGGGCC expansion repeat region, which has lowered the toxicity in cellular models of C9orf72. ASOs have previously been used to restore normal phenotypes in other neurological diseases that have gain-of-function mechanisms, the only difference is that it was used in the absence of G-quadruplex expansion repeat regions.

The G-quadruplex decoy strategy is another promising approach for targeting cancer cells by exploiting the unique structural features of the G-quadruplex. The strategy involves designing synthetic oligonucleotides that mimic the G-quadruplex structure and compete with the endogenous G-quadruplexes for binding to transcription factors. These decoys are typically composed of a G-rich sequence that can form a stable G-quadruplex structure and a short linker region that can be modified to optimize their properties. When introduced to cancer cells the decoy can intercept associated transcription factors and bind them leading to the regulation of gene expression. Decoys have been successfully demonstrated to inhibit oncogenic KRAS in SCID mice leading to reduced tumour growth and increased median survival time.

=== Small-molecule ligands ===
Another commonly used technique is the utilization of small-molecule ligands. These can be used to target G-quadruplex regions that cause neurological disorders. Approximately 1,000 various G-quadruplex ligands exist in which they are able to interact via their aromatic rings; this allows the small-molecule ligands to stack on the planar terminal tetrads within the G-quadruplex regions. A disadvantage of using small-molecule ligands as a therapeutic technique is that specificity is difficult to manage due to the variability of G-quadruplexes in their primary sequences, orientation, thermodynamic stability, and nucleic acid strand stoichiometry. As of now, no single small-molecule ligand has been able to be perfectly specific for a single G-quadruplex sequence. However, a cationic porphyrin known as TMPyP4 is able to bind to the C9orf72 GGGGCC repeat region, which causes the G-quadruplex repeat region to unfold and lose its interactions with proteins causing it to lose its functionality. Small-molecule ligands, composed primarily of lead, can target GGGGCC repeat regions as well and ultimately decreased both repeat-associated non-ATG translation and RNA foci in neuron cells derived from patients with Amyotrophic lateral sclerosis (ALS). This provides evidence that small-molecule ligands are an effective and efficient process to target GGGGCC regions, and that specificity for small-molecule ligand binding is a feasible goal for the scientific community.

Metal complexes have a number of features that make them particularly suitable as G4 DNA binders and therefore as potential drugs. While the metal plays largely a structural role in most G4 binders, there are also examples where it interacts directly with G4s by electrostatic interactions or direct coordination with nucleobases.

=== G-quadruplex-forming aptamers ===
In addition to targeting endogenous G-quadruplexes with antisense oligonucleotides or small molecules, G-quadruplex folding can also be exploited in aptamer-based therapeutic and diagnostic strategies. Several G-rich aptamers adopt G-quadruplex structures and have been explored as inhibitors of clinically relevant protein targets, including thrombin-binding aptamers evaluated in early clinical studies and the nucleolin-targeting aptamer AS1411, which reached phase II oncology trials.

Aptamers are short, single-stranded DNA or RNA ligands typically selected by in vitro selection (SELEX). A subset of aptamers is guanine-rich and can fold into G-quadruplex structures, which can contribute to target recognition and to the stability of the oligonucleotide scaffold.

One of the best-known G-quadruplex aptamers is the thrombin-binding DNA aptamer (TBA/HD1), originally isolated by SELEX as an inhibitor of human thrombin. Structural studies showed that this 15-nt sequence can adopt an intramolecular DNA quadruplex fold in solution. Other thrombin aptamers can combine a G-quadruplex core with additional structural elements such as duplex regions.

A broader survey of aptamer sequences has suggested that G-quadruplex propensity may be common: an analysis of sequences in the UTexas Aptamer Database reported that nearly one quarter of DNA aptamers and one sixth of RNA aptamers are predicted to form G-quadruplexes, while no strong i-motif candidates were identified, and that quadruplex-forming motifs are often not reported in the corresponding publications. In the same study, experimental testing of selected candidates supported G-quadruplex formation for sequences above a defined G4Hunter threshold.
