= LNWR Jubilee Class =

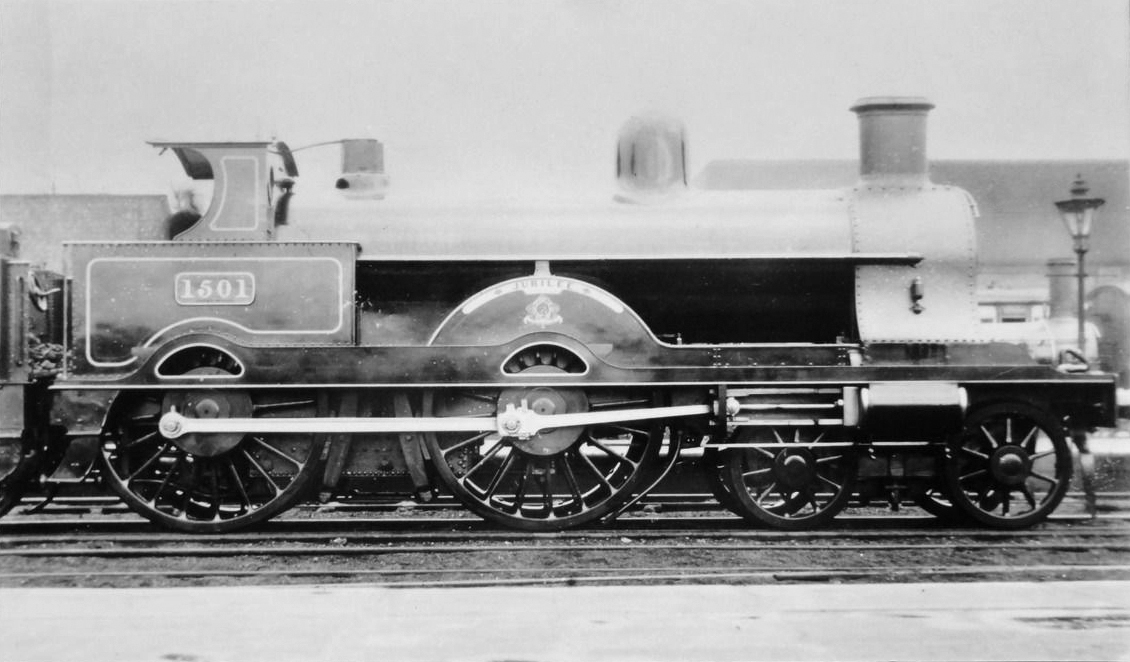
- No.1501 Jubilee, note the double chimney
Type and origin
- Power type: Steam
- Designer: Francis Webb
- Builder: Crewe Works
- Build date: 1897–1900
- Total produced: 40
Specifications
- Configuration
  - Whyte: 4-4-0
  - UIC: 2′B n4v
- Gauge: 4 ft 8 1/2 in (1,435 mm)
- Leading dia.: 3 ft 9 in (1.143 m)
- Driver dia.: 7 ft 1 in (2.159 m)
- Loco weight: 54.50 long tons (55.37 t)
- Boiler pressure: 200 psi (1.38 MPa)
- Cylinders: Four, two outside high-pressure, two inside low-pressure
- High-pressure cylinder: 15 in × 24 in (381 mm × 610 mm)
- Low-pressure cylinder: 20 1/2 in × 24 in (521 mm × 610 mm)
- Valve gear: Joy, one set for each pair of cylinders.
Performance figures
- Tractive effort: 80%: 29,152 lbf (129.7 kN)
Career
- Operators: LNWR · LMS
- Power class: LMS: 2P
- Number in class: 1 January 1923: 9
- Numbers: LNWR: 1901–1940; LMS: 5110–5117
- Withdrawn: 1923–1925
- Disposition: All scrapped

The London and North Western Railway (LNWR) Jubilee Class was a class of 4-4-0 4-cylinder compound locomotives by F.W. Webb. A total of forty were built from 1897–1900. Slightly unusually for the LNWR, the class received a number series, this being 1901–1940. All were named, mostly after Royal Navy battleships.

== Iron Duke and Black Prince ==
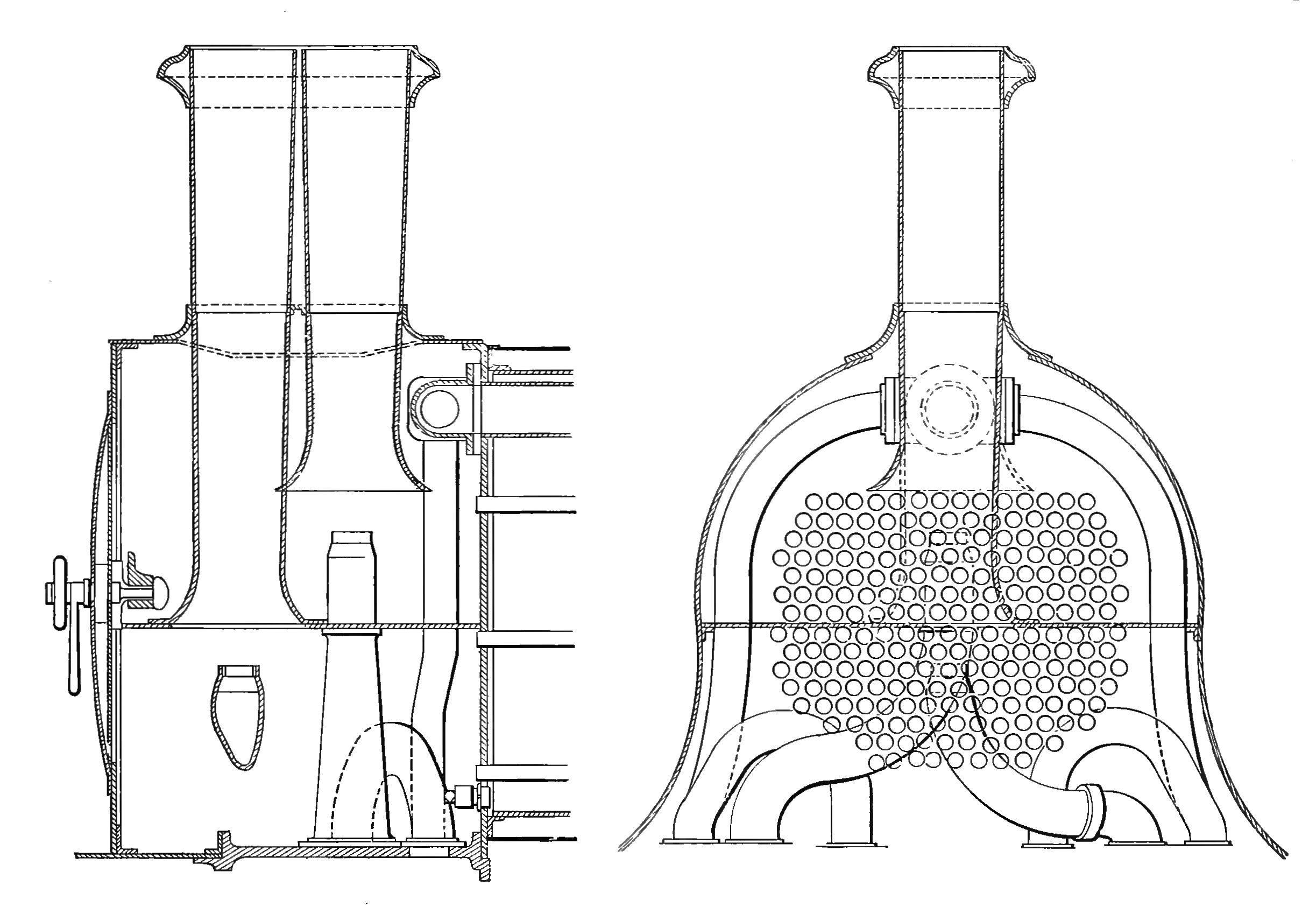
Smoke box details of the Black Prince

The first two of this class were prototypes, built to different designs to permit a comparison. The first, No. 1501 the Iron Duke (later re-named Diamond Jubilee and then Jubilee), was a 4-cylinder simple locomotive with 15 in × 24 in (381 mm × 610 mm) cylinders. The second, No. 1502 Black Prince, was not Webb's first compound, but was his first 4-cylinder compound and the first in the UK. The outside high-pressure cylinders were the same as Iron Duke's, the inside low-pressure cylinders were 19 1/2 in × 24 in (495 mm × 610 mm).

There was no simpling valve or other means for starting, and so when starting they just operated as small 2-cylinder simples. The Joy valve gear was shared between high and low pressure, with a rocking lever to the high-pressure valves. The inside cylinders were angled above the outside cylinders and although this could have been solved by cranking the rocking levers, this gave an uneven drive to the valves; valve-setting between both of them had to be a compromise position, ideal for neither, and so gave an uneven power distribution between high and low. Their running was thus not as free-running as it might have been, which Webb would address in his later designs.

These were also Webb's first designs with a leading bogie rather than a pony truck, which was also described as a "double radial truck". The truck pivots geometrically at a point behind its rear axle, although there is no single mechanical pivot point. This motion is controlled instead, like Webb's earlier single radial truck, by curved radial slides, with a radius of curvature at the centre of the truck of 10 ft 9 in (3.28 m).

Another novel feature was that both locomotives were fitted with double chimneys. The smokebox was partitioned internally into upper and lower halves, the lower section exhausting through the front chimney and the upper tubes through the rear chimney. The blastpipes were fed separately, the front chimney from the left cylinders and the rear from the right. After some time in service, the two chimneys were replaced with a single chimney on an undivided smokebox and their performance and fuel consumption measured again. It was found that the compound locomotive had identical performance both with and without the double chimney, but that the simple locomotive was improved by it. The double chimney was re-fitted to Jubilee, but the production locomotives were built as compounds without it.

After around a year's running, the simple had run for 33,517 miles, with an average coal consumption of 40.3 pounds per mile and the compound (starting slightly later) for 23,503 miles with a consumption of 38.1 pounds per mile. The compound was thus cheaper by 2.2 pounds per mile, or 5%.

The ratio between LP and HP cylinders was 1.69, lower than that considered optimal. Webb's 3-cylinder compounds had used the more usual figure of 2. To improve this to 1.87, Webb had decided to increase the size of the LP cylinders to 20 1/2 in × 24 in (521 mm × 610 mm), and this was applied to the production locomotives.

== Service ==
As with other Webb compounds, they were mechanically unreliable. As a result, George Whale rebuilt these as two-cylinder simple locomotives of the Renown Class, starting with 1918 Renown in 1908. Rebuilt engines retained their numbers. Rebuilding continued so that at the grouping of 1923, only 9 Jubilees remained, being 1903/4/8/11/12/15/23/27/29.

1908 Royal George was withdrawn in January 1923, but the remaining eight were allocated the LMS numbers 5110–5117, in sequence. Two, 1904 Rob Roy and 1923 Agamemnon were withdrawn 1923, without receiving new numbers. The LMS rebuilt the remaining six into Renowns in 1924, making the class extinct (Their subsequent history is discussed at LNWR Renown Class).

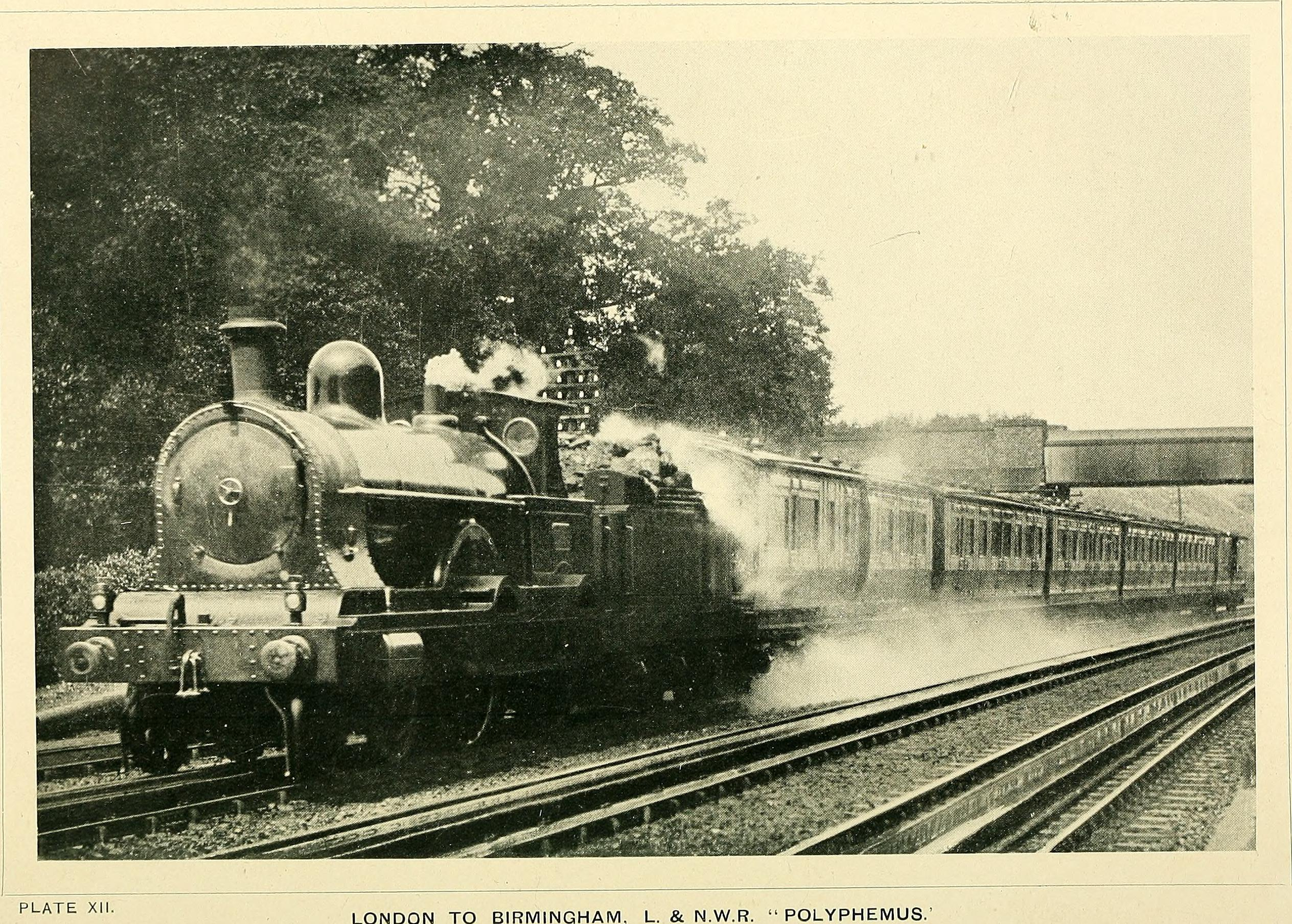
Polyphemus with a London-Birmingham Down service, around 1910

A successor to this class, the Alfred the Great class, retained the 4-cylinder compound design but used two sets of valvegear, both Joy, allowing the LP cutoff to be controlled independently.

== Locomotive list ==
LNWR Jubilee class locomotive list
LNWR No.	LNWR name	Crewe Works No.	Date built	Date rebuilt	LMS No.	Date withdrawn	Notes
1901	Jubilee	3856	Jun 1897	Apr 1919	5156		Named Iron Duke until December 1897, numbered 1501 until March 1899
1902	Black Prince	3857	Jun 1897	Aug 1919	5157		Numbered 1502 until March 1899
1903	Iron Duke	3928	Mar 1899	May 1924	5110		
1904	Rob Roy	3929	Mar 1899	—	(5111)	May 1923	Never carried its LMS number
1905	Black Diamond	3930	Mar 1899	Aug 1914	5137		
1906	Robin Hood	3931	Apr 1899	May 1917	5149		
1907	Black Watch	3932	Apr 1899	Feb 1922	5178		
1908	Royal George	3933	Apr 1899	—	—	Jan 1923	
1909	Crusader	3934	Apr 1899	Nov 1919	5159		
1910	Cavalier	3935	Apr 1899	Aug 1921	5172		
1911	Centurion	3936	Jun 1899	Dec 1924	5112		
1912	Colossus	3937	Jun 1899	May 1924	5113		
1913	Canopus	3938	Jun 1899	Mar 1910	5132		
1914	Invincible	3939	Jun 1899	Sep 1916	5144		Renumbered 1257 in April 1920
1915	Implacable	3940	Jun 1899	Nov 1923	5114		
1916	Irresistible	3941	Jul 1899	Feb 1919	5155		
1917	Inflexible	3942	Jul 1899	Aug 1922	5184		
1918	Renown	3943	Jul 1899	Jun 1908	5131		
1919	Resolution	3944	Aug 1899	Nov 1919	5160		
1920	Flying Fox	3945	Aug 1899	Dec 1920	5166		
1921	John of Gaunt	3995	Feb 1900	Apr 1913	5134		Named T. H. Ismay until April 1913
1922	Intrepid	3996	Feb 1900	Oct 1916	5146		
1923	Agamemnon	3997	Mar 1900	—	(5115)		Never carried its LMS number
1924	Powerful	3998	Mar 1900	Jun 1922	5183		
1925	Warrior	3999	Mar 1900	Apr 1917	5147		
1926	La France	4000	Mar 1900	Mar 1922	5180		Shown at Exposition Universelle in Paris
1927	Goliath	4001	Mar 1900	Jan 1924	5116		
1928	Glatton	4002	Apr 1900	Aug 1921	5173		
1929	Polyphemus	4003	Apr 1900	Feb 1924	5117		
1930	Ramillies	4004	Apr 1900	Apr 1916	5142		
1931	Agincourt	4045	Sep 1900	Dec 1921	5176		
1932	Anson	4046	Sep 1900	Jun 1920	5162		
1933	Barfleur	4047	Sep 1900	Apr 1921	5169		
1934	Blenheim	4048	Sep 1900	Sep 1920	5165		
1935	Collingwood	4049	Oct 1900	Mar 1910	5133		
1936	Royal Sovereign	4050	Oct 1900	Jun 1917	5150		
1937	Superb	4051	Oct 1900	Jan 1919	5154		
1938	Sultan	4052	Oct 1900	Feb 1920	5161		
1939	Temeraire	4053	Oct 1900	Aug 1919	5158		
1940	Trafalgar	4054	Oct 1900	Apr 1921	5170		
