= LNWR Alfred the Great Class =

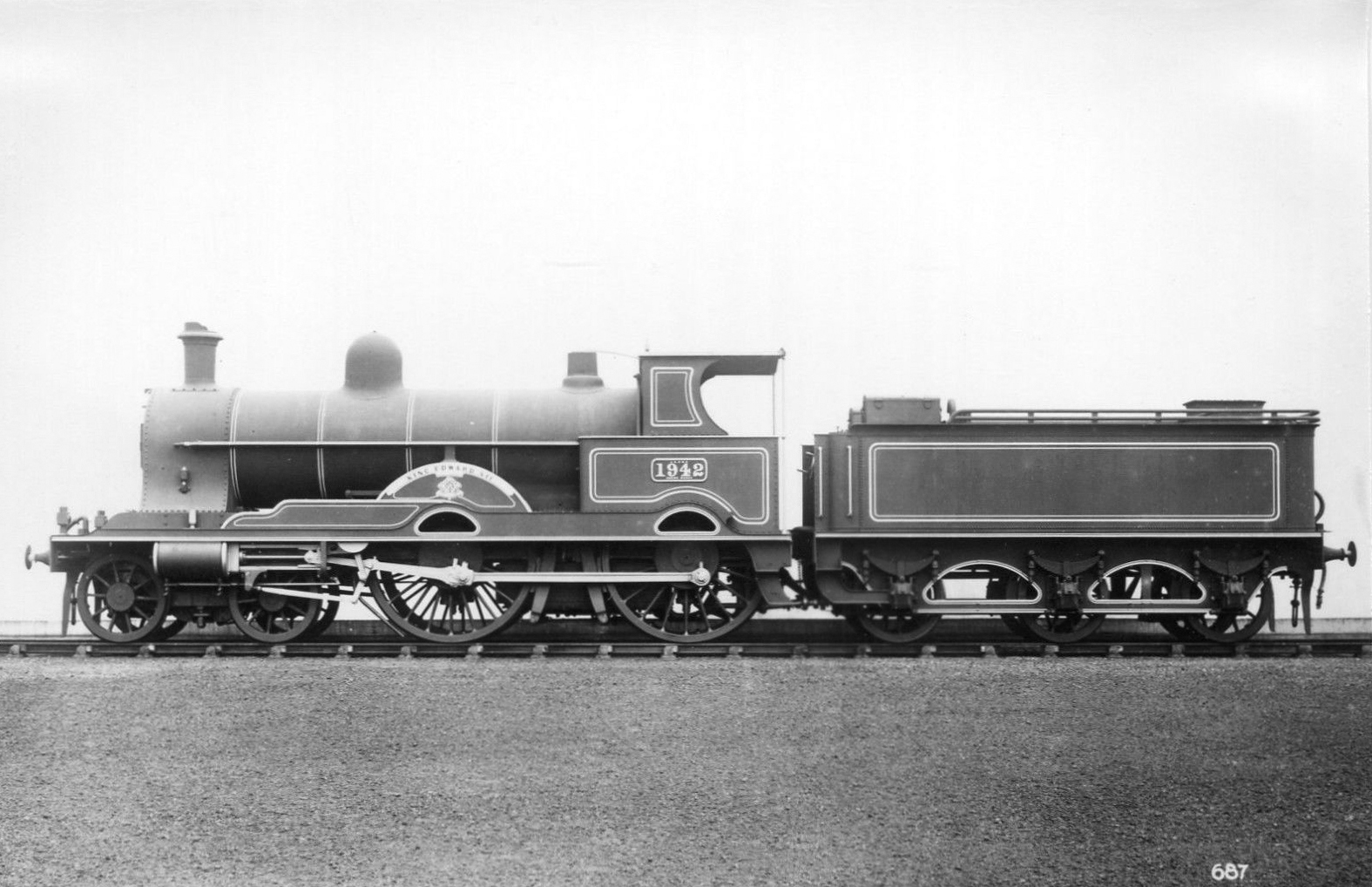
- No. 1942 King Edward VII in photographic grey livery
Type and origin
- Power type: Steam
- Designer: F. W. Webb
- Builder: Crewe Works
- Serial number: 4125–4134, 4195–4204, 4285–4294, 4335–4344
- Build date: 1901–1903
- Total produced: 40
Specifications
- Configuration
  - Whyte: 4-4-0
  - UIC: 2′B n4v
- Gauge: 4 ft 8 1/2 in (1,435 mm)
- Leading dia.: 3 ft 9 in (1.143 m)
- Driver dia.: 7 ft 1 in (2.159 m)
- Loco weight: 57.60 long tons (58.52 t)
- Boiler pressure: 200 lbf/in^{2} (1.38 MPa)
- Heating surface: 1,579.5 sq ft (146.74 m^{2})
- Cylinders: Four: two HP (outside); two LP (inside)
- High-pressure cylinder: 16 in × 24 in (406 mm × 610 mm)
- Low-pressure cylinder: 20 1/2 in × 24 in (521 mm × 610 mm)
- Valve gear: Joy, separate for HP & LP with independent control of cutoff
Performance figures
- Tractive effort: 80%: 16,544 lbf (73.59 kN)
Career
- Operators: London and North Western Railway; London, Midland and Scottish Railway
- Power class: LMS: 2P
- Number in class: 1 January 1923: 15
- Withdrawn: 1923–1928
- Disposition: 33 rebuilt as 2-cylinder simple Renown-class locomotives (1913–1924); remainder (and all Renowns) scrapped.

The London and North Western Railway (LNWR) Alfred the Great class, after modification known as the Benbow class, was a class of 4-4-0 4-cylinder compound locomotives by F.W. Webb. A total of forty were built from 1901–1903. They were a development of the Jubilee class, with a slightly larger boiler.

Unusually for the LNWR, the locomotives were assigned a number series, this being 1941–1980.

Compounds had proven unreliable, so starting in 1908 Whale started rebuilding the Jubilees into the 2-cylinder simple Renown class. Bowen Cooke started the same process with the Benbows in 1913, and these too were added to the Renown class. Rebuilt engines retained their numbers. Benbow 1974 Howe was superheated in 1921; the only member of the class modified as such.

Number 1976 Lady Godiva was withdrawn in December 1922 without rebuilding. By the grouping of 1 January 1923, when the LNWR passed into London, Midland and Scottish Railway (LMS) ownership, 25 had been rebuilt to Renowns, leaving fourteen Benbows. Of these, 1956 was withdrawn in early 1923 before it could be allocated an LMS number, but the remaining 13 (1944/52–55/64/66/67/69/70/74/77/79) were allocated the LMS numbers 5118–5130, sequentially. The LMS continued conversions, rebuilding another eight—1952–54/64/67/69/70/74 in 1923/4. The remainder four Benbows (1944/55/66/79) were withdrawn and scrapped between 1923 and 1927, with 1974 Howe going in 1928; none of these last five received their allocated LMS numbers.

== Stock list ==
LNWR/LMS stock list
LNWR No.	LNWR Name	Crewe Works No.	Date built	Date rebuilt	LMS No.	Date withdrawn	Notes
1941	Alfred the Great	4125	May 1901	February 1922	5179		
1942	King Edward VII	4126	May 1901	September 1922	5185		
1943	Queen Alexandra	4127	June 1901	September 1916	5145		
1944	Victoria and Albert	4128	June 1901	—	5118	February 1927	Never carried its LMS number
1945	Magnificent	4129	June 1901	September 1915	5139		
1946	Diadem	4130	June 1901	October 1914	5138		
1947	Zillah	4131	June 1901	September 1921	5174		Originally named Australia
1948	Camperdown	4132	June 1901	October 1915	5141		
1949	King Arthur	4133	June 1901	January 1918	5152		
1950	Victorious	4134	June 1901	October 1922	5186		
1951	Bacchante	4195	January 1902	October 1913	5136		
1952	Benbow	4196	January 1902	November 1923	5119		
1953	Formidable	4197	February 1902	December 1923	5120		
1954	Galatea	4198	February 1902	October 1924	5121		
1955	Hannibal	4199	February 1902	—	5122	August 1923	Never carried its LMS number
1956	Illustrious	4200	February 1902	—	—	January 1923	
1957	Orion	4201	March 1902	April 1917	5148		
1958	Royal Oak	4202	March 1902	April 1922	5181		
1959	Revenge	4203	March 1902	April 1916	5143		
1960	Francis Stevenson	4204	March 1902	February 1918	5153		
1961	Albemarle	4285	February 1903	September 1915	5140		
1962	Aurora	4286	February 1903	June 1921	5171		
1963	Boadicea	4287	February 1903	June 1920	5163		
1964	Caesar	4288	February 1903	September 1924	5123		
1965	Charles H. Mason	4289	February 1903	August 1917	5151		
1966	Commonwealth	4290	February 1903	—	5124	April 1925	Never carried its LMS number
1967	Cressy	4291	March 1903	November 1923	5125		Never carried its LMS number
1968	Cumberland	4292	March 1903	June 1920	5164		
1969	Dominion	4293	March 1903	April 1924	5126		
1970	Good Hope	4294	March 1903	April 1924	5127		
1971	Euryalus	4335	July 1903	April 1913	5135		
1972	Hindostan	4336	July 1903	March 1921	5168		
1973	Hood	4337	July 1903	September 1921	5175		
1974	Howe	4338	July 1903	—	5128	March 1928	Superheated 1921. Never carried its LMS number
1975	Jupiter	4339	July 1903	January 1921	5167		
1976	Lady Godiva	4340	July 1903	—	—	December 1922	
1977	Mars	4341	July 1903	February 1924	5129		
1978	Merlin	4342	July 1903	December 1921	5177		
1979	Nelson	4343	July 1903	—	5130	August 1923	Never carried its LMS number
1980	Neptune	4344	August 1903	May 1922	5182		
