= LNWR Renown Class =

Class of 4-4-0 steam locomotives of the London and North Western Railway

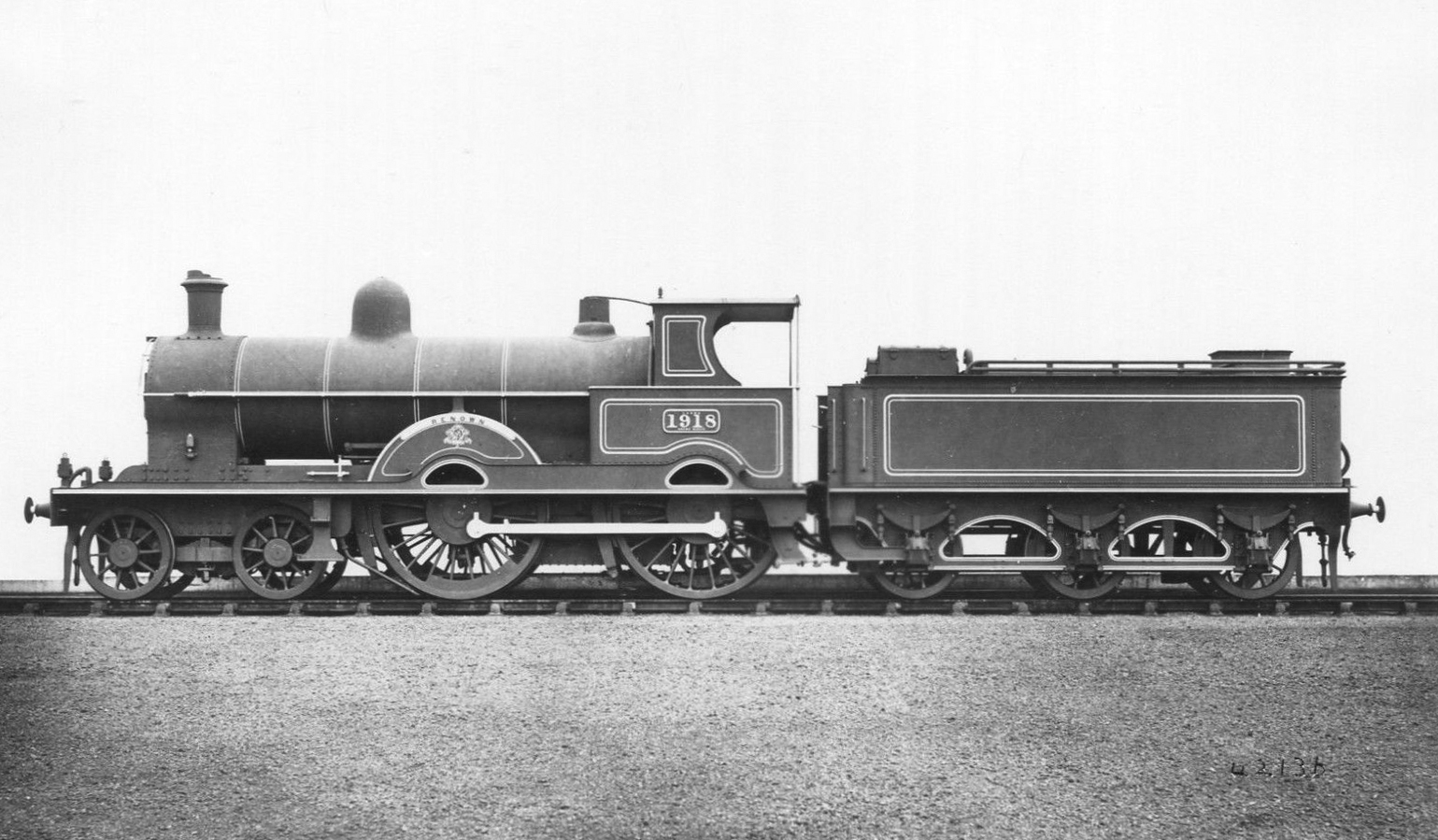
- No. 1918 Renown in photographic grey livery
Type and origin
- Power type: Steam
- Designer: George Whale
- Builder: LNWR Crewe Works
- Build date: 1897–1903
- Rebuild date: 1908–1924
- Number rebuilt: 70
Specifications
- Configuration
  - Whyte: 4-4-0
  - UIC: 2′B
- Gauge: 4 ft 8 1/2 in (1,435 mm)
- Driver dia.: 7 ft 1 in (2.159 m)
- Loco weight: 56.00 long tons (56.90 t)
- Fuel type: Coal
- Boiler pressure: 200 psi (1.38 MPa)
- Cylinders: Two
- Cylinder size: 18.5 in × 24 in (470 mm × 610 mm)
- Valve gear: Joy
Performance figures
- Tractive effort: 16,428 lbf (73.1 kN)
Career
- Operators: London and North Western Railway → London, Midland and Scottish Railway
- Power class: LMS: 2P
- Number in class: 1 January 1923: 56
- Withdrawn: 1925–1931
- Disposition: All scrapped

The London and North Western Railway (LNWR) Renown Class was a class of 4-4-0 steam locomotives. They were rebuilds of F.W. Webb's 4-cylinder compounds of the Jubilee and Alfred the Great classes into 2-cylinder simple engines by George Whale, later continued by Charles Bowen-Cooke.

The first to be rebuilt was number 1918 Renown in 1908.

The rebuilds retained their original numbers. Unusually for the LNWR, the parent classes also had logical number series. Thus the Renowns were all numbered in the 1901–1940 series for ex-Jubilee Class and 1941–1980 for ex-Benbow class. In 1920, locomotive 1914 Invincible was renumbered 1257, and the number 1914 was then taken by the Claughton Class war memorial engine 1914 Patriot.

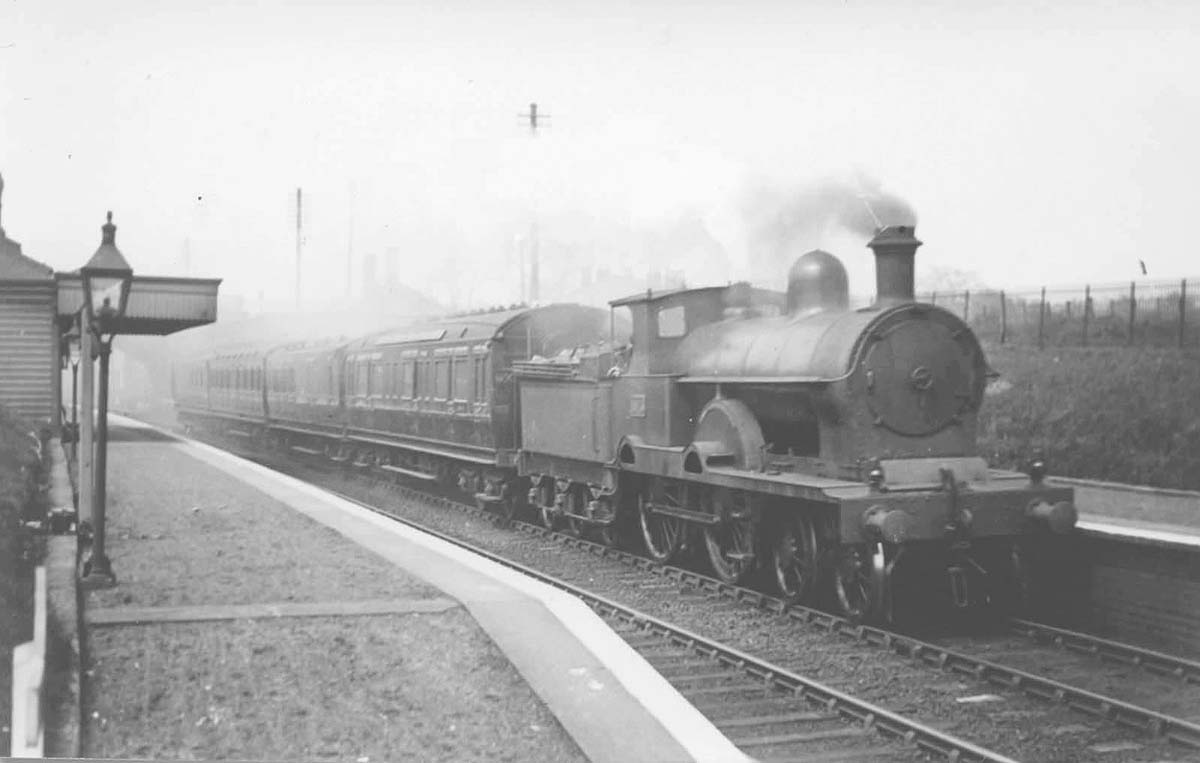
Renown Class 'Implacable', no. 1915, passes through Great Barr on an up passenger service circa 1923.

The London, Midland and Scottish Railway (LMS) acquired 56 Renowns in 1923. The LMS allocated these numbers in the 5131–5186 series, listed according to date of rebuilding, though not all numbers were applied before withdrawals started in 1928. Meanwhile, the LMS renumbered the existing compounds into the 5110–5129 series (though some were withdrawn before numbers could be allocated, and others were allocated numbers but not applied), and converted another 14 of these, which retained their numbers, thus taking the total for the class up to 70. All were withdrawn and scrapped by 1931.

== Accidents and incidents ==
- On 14 August 1915, a locomotive hauling a passenger train suffered a mechanical defect which resulted in the track being damaged at weedon, Northamptonshire. Locomotive No. 1971 Aurora was one of two hauling a mail train that was derailed on the damaged track. Ten people were killed and 21 were injured.

== Locomotive list ==
LNWR Renown class locomotive list
| LNWR No. | LNWR name | Rebuilt from | Date rebuilt | LMS No. | Date withdrawn | Notes |
|---|---|---|---|---|---|---|
| 1901 | Jubilee | Jubilee | April 1919 | 5156 | December 1931 | |
| 1902 | Black Prince | Jubilee | August 1919 | 5157 | July 1930 | |
| 1903 | Iron Duke | Jubilee | May 1924 | 5110 | November 1931 | |
| 1905 | Black Diamond | Jubilee | August 1914 | 5137 | November 1930 | |
| 1906 | Robin Hood | Jubilee | May 1917 | 5149 | December 1931 | |
| 1907 | Black Watch | Jubilee | February 1922 | 5178 | June 1926 | |
| 1909 | Crusader | Jubilee | November 1919 | 5159 | April 1928 | |
| 1910 | Cavalier | Jubilee | August 1921 | 5172 | April 1931 | |
| 1911 | Centurion | Jubilee | December 1924 | 5112 | December 1931 | |
| 1912 | Colossus | Jubilee | May 1924 | 5113 | November 1929 | |
| 1913 | Canopus | Jubilee | March 1910 | 5132 | September 1928 | |
| 1914 | Invincible | Jubilee | September 1916 | 5144 | October 1931 | Renumbered 1257 in 1920 |
| 1915 | Implacable | Jubilee | November 1923 | 5114 | July 1928 | |
| 1916 | Irresistible | Jubilee | February 1919 | 5155 | September 1930 | |
| 1917 | Inflexible | Jubilee | August 1922 | 5184 | December 1931 | |
| 1918 | Renown | Jubilee | June 1908 | 5131 | September 1928 | |
| 1919 | Resolution | Jubilee | November 1919 | 5160 | November 1928 | |
| 1920 | Flying Fox | Jubilee | December 1920 | 5166 | December 1930 | |
| 1921 | John of Gaunt | Jubilee | April 1913 | 5134 | July 1926 | |
| 1922 | Intrepid | Jubilee | October 1916 | 5146 | November 1927 | |
| 1924 | Powerful | Jubilee | June 1922 | 5183 | December 1931 | |
| 1925 | Warrior | Jubilee | April 1917 | 5147 | February 1928 | |
| 1926 | La France | Jubilee | March 1922 | 5180 | December 1931 | |
| 1927 | Goliath | Jubilee | January 1924 | 5116 | December 1931 | |
| 1928 | Glatton | Jubilee | August 1921 | 5173 | December 1931 | |
| 1929 | Polyphemus | Jubilee | February 1924 | 5117 | December 1930 | |
| 1930 | Ramillies | Jubilee | April 1916 | 5142 | November 1930 | |
| 1931 | Agincourt | Jubilee | December 1921 | 5176 | June 1930 | |
| 1932 | Anson | Jubilee | June 1920 | 5162 | April 1925 | |
| 1933 | Barfleur | Jubilee | April 1921 | 5169 | January 1928 | |
| 1934 | Blenheim | Jubilee | September 1920 | 5165 | December 1931 | |
| 1935 | Collingwood | Jubilee | March 1910 | 5133 | November 1929 | |
| 1936 | Royal Sovereign | Jubilee | June 1917 | 5150 | June 1925 | |
| 1937 | Superb | Jubilee | January 1919 | 5154 | October 1928 | |
| 1938 | Sultan | Jubilee | February 1920 | 5161 | October 1928 | |
| 1939 | Temeraire | Jubilee | August 1919 | 5158 | October 1928 | |
| 1940 | Trafalgar | Jubilee | April 1921 | 5170 | November 1929 | |
| 1941 | Alfred the Great | Alfred | February 1922 | 5179 | September 1931 | |
| 1942 | King Edward VII | Alfred | September 1922 | 5185 | February 1930 | |
| 1943 | Queen Alexandra | Alfred | September 1916 | 5145 | October 1928 | |
| 1945 | Magnificent | Alfred | September 1915 | 5139 | June 1930 | |
| 1946 | Diadem | Alfred | October 1914 | 5138 | December 1931 | |
| 1947 | Zillah | Alfred | September 1921 | 5174 | October 1925 | |
| 1948 | Camperdown | Alfred | October 1915 | 5141 | August 1930 | |
| 1949 | King Arthur | Alfred | January 1918 | 5152 | May 1930 | |
| 1950 | Victorius | Alfred | October 1922 | 5186 | December 1931 | |
| 1951 | Bacchante | Alfred | October 1913 | 5136 | April 1925 | |
| 1952 | Benbow | Alfred | November 1923 | 5119 | February 1928 | |
| 1953 | Formidable | Alfred | December 1923 | 5120 | October 1928 | |
| 1954 | Galatea | Alfred | October 1924 | 5121 | July 1930 | |
| 1957 | Orion | Alfred | April 1917 | 5148 | January 1928 | |
| 1958 | Royal Oak | Alfred | April 1922 | 5181 | October 1928 | |
| 1959 | Revenge | Alfred | April 1916 | 5143 | January 1930 | |
| 1960 | Francis Stevenson | Alfred | February 1918 | 5153 | October 1928 | |
| 1961 | Albemarle | Alfred | September 1915 | 5140 | October 1928 | |
| 1962 | Aurora | Alfred | June 1921 | 5171 | March 1926 | |
| 1963 | Boadicea | Alfred | June 1920 | 5163 | November 1928 | |
| 1964 | Caesar | Alfred | September 1924 | 5123 | November 1929 | |
| 1965 | Charles H. Mason | Alfred | August 1917 | 5151 | June 1925 | |
| 1967 | Cressy | Alfred | November 1923 | 5125 | February 1928 | LMS number not applied |
| 1968 | Cumberland | Alfred | June 1920 | 5164 | September 1928 | |
| 1969 | Dominion | Alfred | April 1924 | 5126 | April 1930 | |
| 1970 | Good Hope | Alfred | April 1924 | 5127 | November 1927 | |
| 1971 | Euryalus | Alfred | April 1913 | 5135 | November 1930 | |
| 1972 | Hindostan | Alfred | March 1921 | 5168 | April 1925 | |
| 1973 | Hood | Alfred | September 1921 | 5175 | July 1926 | |
| 1975 | Jupiter | Alfred | January 1921 | 5167 | November 1928 | |
| 1977 | Mars | Alfred | February 1924 | 5129 | December 1930 | |
| 1978 | Merlin | Alfred | December 1921 | 5177 | May 1930 | |
| 1980 | Neptune | Alfred | May 1922 | 5182 | December 1931 | |
