= HMCS Crusader =

C-class destroyer

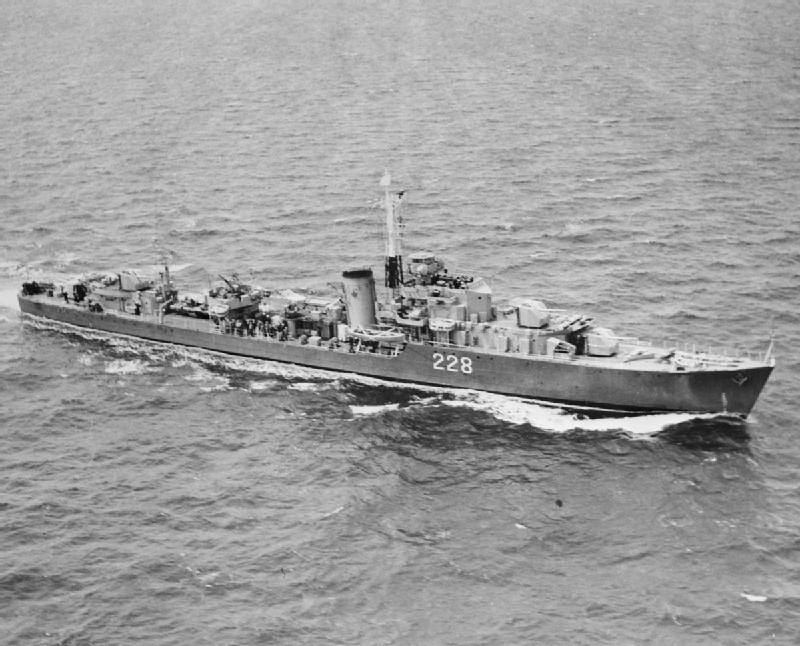
- HMCS Crusader underway

History

United Kingdom
- Name: Crusader
- Ordered: 12 September 1942
- Builder: John Brown & Company
- Laid down: 15 November 1943
- Launched: 4 October 1944
- Identification: Pennant number: R20
- Fate: Transferred to Canada 1945, permanently in 1951

Canada
- Name: Crusader
- Acquired: 26 November 1945
- Commissioned: 26 November 1945
- Decommissioned: 15 January 1960
- Identification: R20/228
- Motto: By this sign we conquer.
- Honours and awards: Korea, 1952–53
- Fate: Sold for scrap, 1964
- Badge: Azure, a crusader's shield bearing in the first canton a maple leaf gules for Canada

General characteristics
- Class & type: C-class destroyer
- Displacement: 1730 tonnes
- Length: 326.75 ft (99.59 m)
- Beam: 35.66 ft (10.87 m)
- Draught: 11.5 ft (3.5 m)
- Propulsion: 2 Admiralty 3-drum boilers; 2 Parsons single reduction geared turbines, 40,000 shp (30,000 kW), 2 shafts
- Speed: 36 knots (67 km/h; 41 mph); 32 knots (59 km/h; 37 mph) full load
- Range: 4,675 nautical miles (8,658 km; 5,380 mi) at 20 knots (37 km/h; 23 mph); 1,400 nautical miles (2,600 km; 1,600 mi) at 32 knots (59 km/h; 37 mph)
- Complement: 14 officers, 230 crew
- Armament: 4 × QF 4.5 in (114 mm) L/45 Mk IV guns on mounts CP Mk.V; 2 × Bofors 40 mm L/60 guns on twin mount "Hazemeyer" Mk.IV; 2 × single 2-pdr Mk VIII; 2 × 20 mm Oerlikon cannon; 4 (1 × 4) tubes for 21 in (533 mm) torpedoes Mk.IX

HMCS Crusader was a C-class destroyer originally ordered by the Royal Navy in 1942 and transferred to the Royal Canadian Navy in 1946. During the Korean War she was the leading ship in the legendary Trainbuster's Club, destroying five North Korean trains in total. She was sold for scrap in 1964.

== Design ==
The C-class destroyer was designed in four groups, Crusader being part of the fourth, or "Cr", group. This group was ordered as the 14th Emergency Flotilla, a group of destroyers based on the machinery of the J-class destroyers.

=== Armament and construction ===
For fire control, the class used the Fuze Keeping Clock High Angle Fire Control Computer. The "Cr" group was fitted with the new Mk VI HA/LA Director while remote power control (RPC) gunlaying equipment was fitted. The additional weight of the new fire control equipment and the powered mountings for the 4.5 inch guns (Note: The new director weighed 10 t compared with 6 t for the Mk I Type K, while adding RPC to the 4.5 in mounts increased weight by 1.7 t per mount.) meant that only one quadruple torpedo mount was fitted, and the depth charge armament was reduced to 35 depth charges. Most of the ships were fitted with a single Hazemayer Bofors mount, although some of the later ships instead had the lighter and simpler Mk V twin Bofors mount. They also introduced the all-welded hull into Royal Navy destroyer construction, with the "Cr" flotilla all being of all-welded construction. Late delivery of the Mk VI directors delayed completion such that none of the "Cr"s entered service before the end of the Second World War.

=== Propulsion ===
The class were all fitted with two Admiralty 3-drum boilers with a pressure of 300 pounds per square inch (2,100 kPa) at 630 °F (332 °C). All had Parsons single-reduction geared turbines, generating 40,000 shaft horsepower (30,000 kW) at 350 RPM, and driving the two shafts to produce a maximum of 36 knots (67 km/h; 41 mph) (32 knots (59 km/h; 37 mph) under full load condition).

Their bunkers could hold 615 tons of oil fuel, giving them a radius of 4,675 nautical miles (8,658 km; 5,380 mi) at 20 knots (37 km/h; 23 mph) and 1,400 nautical miles (2,600 km; 1,600 mi) at 32 knots (59 km/h; 37 mph).

== Service history ==
Crusader was ordered on 12 September 1942 as part of the 14th Emergency Flotilla of the War Emergency Programme. The hull was laid down on 15 November 1943 by John Brown & Company at Clydebank and launched on 5 October 1944.

After a year's negotiation, the Admiralty agreed to lend the Royal Canadian Navy a flotilla of C-class destroyers in January 1945. These were intended for use against the Japanese in the Pacific Ocean. However, the war in the Pacific ended before any of the ships were completed and in the end, only two were lent to Canada. As they were only loaned, the two ships kept their names, unlike the last HMS Crusader to have been transferred to the Royal Canadian Navy.

The vessel was commissioned into the Royal Canadian Navy on 15 November 1945 at Clydebank with the pennant number R20. Crusader was completed on 26 November 1945 and transited to the west coast of Canada via the Azores and the Caribbean Sea. The destroyer was placed in reserve shortly after arrival and remained as such until reactivation for the Korean War. The destroyer was reactivated on 2 April 1951, initially as a training ship for cadets.

Crusader performed two tours of service in the Korean War, one prior to and one after the Armistice. The first tour took place from June 1952, lasting until June 1953. The second tour lasted from November 1953 until August 1954.

Following the ship's return from the Korean peninsula, Crusader took up a training role. On 14 February 1955, the destroyer departed Esquimalt for Halifax, Nova Scotia for use as a test and evaluation ship. The ship was used as a test platform for the newly developed variable depth sonar in 1958. The destroyer remained in this role until being paid off 15 January 1960 at Halifax. She was sold for scrap in 1964.

== See also ==
- List of ships of the Canadian Navy
