= HMS Crusader =

Three ships of the Royal Navy have borne the name HMS Crusader, after the participants in the Medieval Crusades:

- HMS Crusader (1909) was a Tribal-class destroyer launched in 1909 and sold in 1920.
- HMS Crusader (H60) was a C-class destroyer launched in 1931. She was transferred to the Royal Canadian Navy in 1938 and renamed HMCS Ottawa. She was sunk in 1942.
- HMS Crusader (R20) was a destroyer of another C class. She was launched in 1944, transferred to the Royal Canadian Navy in 1945 and sold in 1964.
