= LNWR Lady of the Lake Class =

Class of British steam locomotives

Lady of the Lake Class or Problem Class
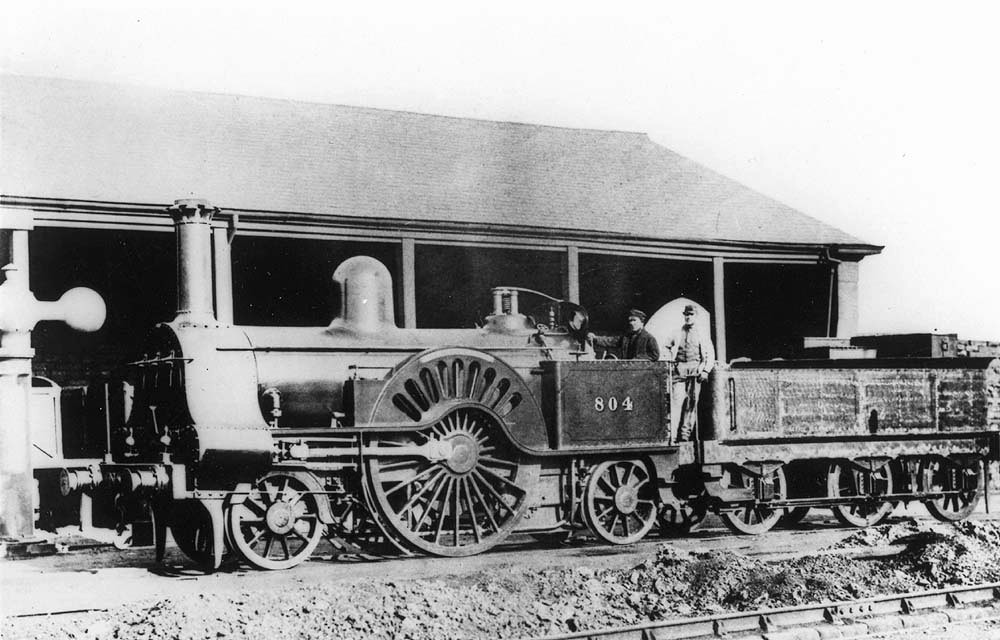
- Lady of the Lake class locomotive No. 804 Soult, near the coke shed at Rugby railway station, c.1868
Type and origin
- Power type: Steam
- Designer: John Ramsbottom
- Builder: Crewe Works
- Build date: 1859–1865
- Total produced: 60
- Rebuild date: 1873 (cab added, black livery); 1879-83 (re-boilering); 1895-97 (extensive rebuild)
Specifications
- Configuration
  - Whyte: 2-2-2
  - UIC: 1A1 n2
- Gauge: 4 ft 8 1/2 in (1,435 mm)
- Leading dia.: 3 ft 6 in (1.067 m)
- Driver dia.: 7 ft 6 in (2.286 m)
- Trailing dia.: 3 ft 6 in (1.067 m)
- Total weight: 27 long tons (27.4 t; 30.2 short tons)
- Water cap.: 1,500 imp gal (6,800 L; 1,800 US gal) to 2,000 imp gal (9,100 L; 2,400 US gal) depending on tender used
- Firebox
  - Grate area: 14.9 sq ft (1.38 m^{2})
- Boiler pressure: 120 psi (0.83 MPa)
- Heating surface: 1,098 sq ft (102.0 m^{2})
- Cylinders: Two, outside
- Cylinder size: 16 in × 24 in (406 mm × 610 mm)
- Valve gear: Stephenson
Career
- Operators: London and North Western Railway
- Withdrawn: 1898–1907
- Disposition: All scrapped

The London and North Western Railway (LNWR) 7 ft 6 in Single 2-2-2 class was a type of express passenger locomotive designed by John Ramsbottom. The class is better known as the Problem class for the first locomotive built, or the Lady of the Lake class for the example that was displayed at the International Exhibition of 1862.

The first examples were built shortly after the acquisition of the Chester and Holyhead Railway by the LNWR, and primarily saw use on the Irish Mail route from London to Holyhead. They were the first locomotives to be fitted with water scoops, which could refill the tender from water troughs between the tracks without stopping. One such locomotive, No. 229 Watt, was the first to use them in non-stop run from Holyhead to Stafford in 1862, while conveying despatches relating to the Trent Affair.

== Design ==
The Lady of the Lake class was the second type of locomotive designed by Ramsbottom. It was typical of express passenger locomotives of its era in having a single driving axle with large (7 ft 6 in (2.286 m) in this instance) driving wheels to achieve high speeds, while avoiding the friction associated with coupled driving wheels (Coupling was done primarily on goods locomotives, where tractive effort was more important than speed). The locomotives bore a resemblance to 2-2-2 designs by Patrick Stirling and Joseph Beattie, yet could also be regarded as a development of Alexander Allan's designs under Ramsbottom's predecessor, Francis Trevithick. They had an open cab, a smokebox door that opened vertically, and open slots on the "splashers" that covered the driving wheels.

Like Ramsbottom's earlier DX Goods design, the Lady of the Lake class made use of the Stephenson valve gear and his own screw design of reversing gear. These locomotives saw the first use of Henri Giffard's steam injector in Britain, as well as the use of a water scoop. They were all painted in the green livery used by the Northern Division. The first locomotive built, No. 184 Problem, was reputed to have gained the name because of the problem of getting the new injector to work, but the first ten engines (of which Problem was one) were fitted with a traditional crosshead pump. Her name may have a more mathematical origin, as the DX Goods locomotive No. 183 was given the name Theorem.

The first locomotives built were given 2,000 imp gal (9,100 L) tenders, but with the introduction of water scoops for refilling en route they were replaced with 1,500 imp gal (6,800 L) tenders.

== 229 Watt and The "Trent Affair" ==
During the American Civil War, two Confederate diplomats travelling on the British mail packet RMS Trent were forcibly removed by Union Captain Charles Wilkes of the USS San Jacinto. This resulted in a diplomatic stand-off between the United States and Britain, and a threat of war. Despatches from the British Ambassador to Washington were eagerly awaited in London and throughout Britain. At this time, mail packets from America landed in Ireland at Queenstown: the mail was carried by rail to Kingstown, and thence by the Irish Mail route via Holyhead. The London and North Western Railway had publicly announced that they would convey the urgent mail from Holyhead to London within five hours.

Locomotives were kept ready for days on end at Queenstown, Holyhead, and Stafford in anticipation of the mail. The steamer from Kingstown arrived alongside the Admiralty pier at Holyhead at 8:15 a.m. on 7 January 1862. Within seven minutes, an Allan 2-2-2 set off to Holyhead station. Here the Allan engine was changed for No. 229 Watt, which set off for Stafford. It was hauling a short train of only three four-wheel coaches. Thanks to the newly installed water troughs near Mochdre, it was able to cover the 130.5 miles (210.0 km) without stopping to take on water, and despite the rough weather of the North Wales coast, reached Stafford 144 minutes later, at an average speed of 54.3 mph (87.4 km/h). This was the greatest non-stop distance covered by a steam train at that time. An engine change was completed at Stafford in as little as a minute and a half, and Bloomer No. 372 took the train on to Euston station, arriving at 1:13 p.m., less than five hours after the steamer had arrived at Holyhead. The Times considered the effort to be "a speed unparalleled over so long a line, crowded with ordinary traffic".

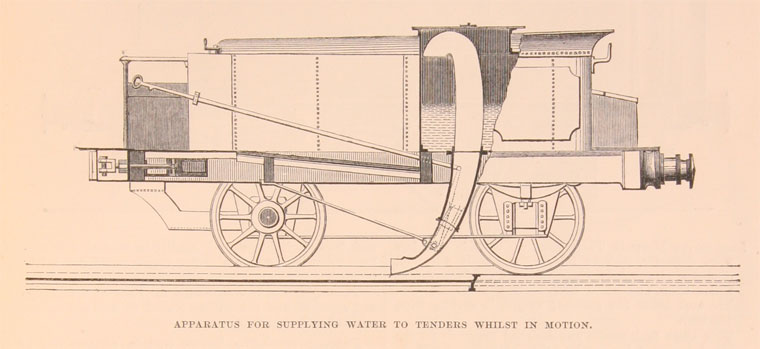
The "apparatus for supplying water to tenders whilst in motion", as illustrated in the exhibition's catalogue.

Later that year, in the 1862 International Exhibition, The LNWR exhibited a locomotive and tender fitted with the "Apparatus for supplying water to tenders whilst in motion". The catalogue made note that this was the same class that ran the "American express" on 7 January, but the locomotive selected was No. 531 Lady of the Lake, rather than Watt itself. The Lady of the Lake was awarded a bronze medal, and the entire class became known to many as the "Lady of the Lake" class.

== Operations ==
The Lady of the Lake class locomotives spent their initial years working the Irish Mail traffic, as well as running local express services in the Manchester, Crewe and Liverpool area. They gained a reputation as "flyers" on the Irish Mail, even though the speed required by the Post Office contract (a 42 mph (68 km/h) average) was not particularly fast by contemporary standards. Sir Richard Moon, Chairman of the LNWR, believed that a speed of 40 mph was sufficient for an express train. The "Ladies" could keep this pace with ease, and were economical to run as well. In later years, however, as speeds and loads increased, the locomotives were used as pilots on double-headed trains, and even some branch services.

== Webb's Rebuilds ==
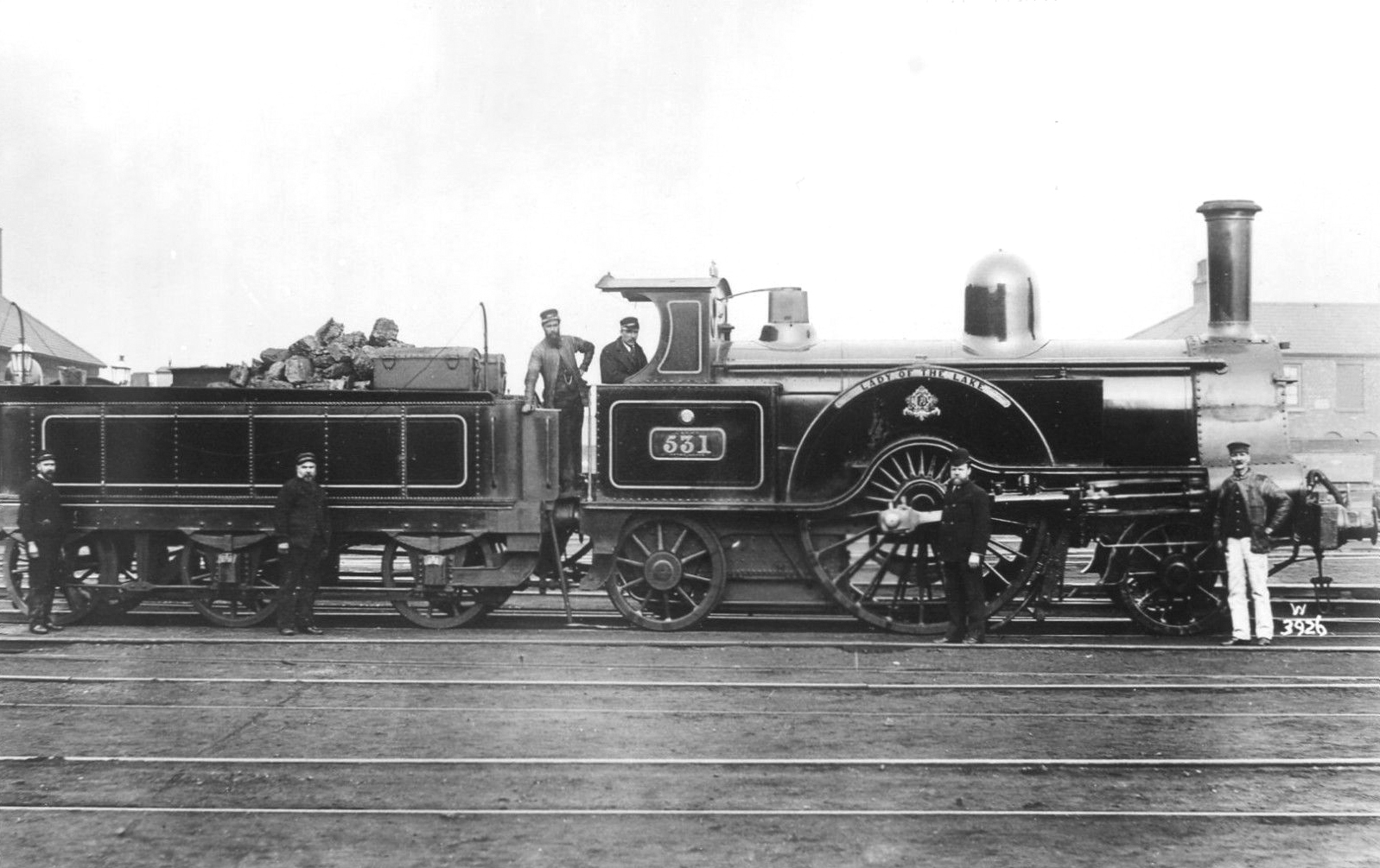
No. 531 Lady of the Lake in black livery

In 1873, two years after Francis Webb took over as engineer from Ramsbottom, the new general manager William Cawkwell decided that black should be the standard colour for all locomotives. The Lady of the Lake class were thus painted as Webb added a cab roof and modified the chimneys of the entire class. When the class received replacement boilers from 1879 to 1883 they were also fitted with steam brakes (previously only the tender had brakes, and they were wooden ones) and enclosed splashers.

The "Ladies" received a very extensive rebuild from 1895–1897. This time they were fitted with enlarged boilers and larger fireboxes, round smokebox doors, crosshead vacuum pumps, new 3 in (76 mm) tyres (which increased the diameter of the driving wheels to 7 ft 9 in or 2.36 m), and cross-stays to stiffen the frames. These rebuilt engines were often used to pilot express trains, achieving speeds of over 80 mph (130 km/h).

== Accidents and incidents ==
- On 20 August, 1868, No. 291 Prince of Wales was hauling the Irish Mail to Holyhead, when it collided with some wagons which had broken away from a goods train up the line. The collision occurred near Abergele, Conwy. Roughly 33 people were killed in the accident.

== Withdrawal ==
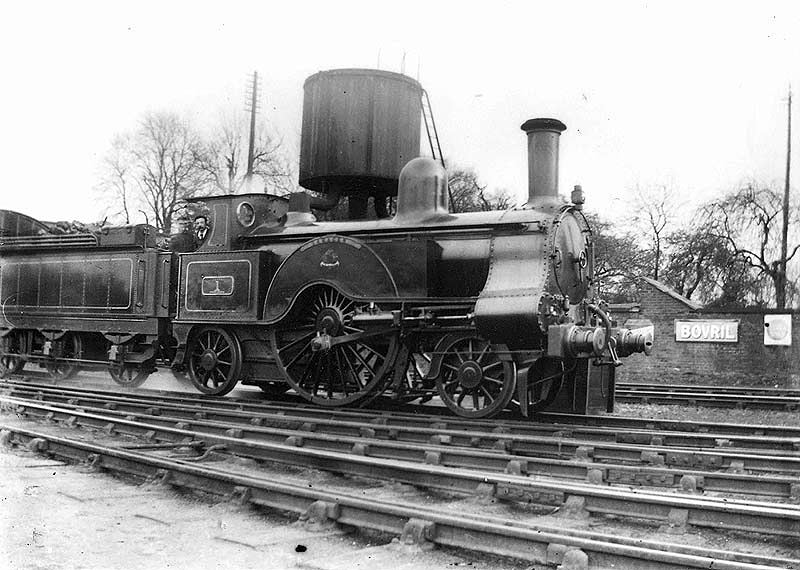
No. 1 Saracen at Nuneaton in 1904, as rebuilt by Webb.

The faster and heavier trains on the London and North Western Railway, combined with the small, economical engines that had been favoured for decades, meant a greater number of services had to be double-headed in order to keep time. George Whale's Precursor Class, introduced in 1904, was able to haul heavy trains on its own, and thus the Ladies and other underpowered engines (such as Webb's 3-cylinder compounds) were scrapped. Some of the Ladies' names (such as Scorpion, Tiger, Watt, and Havelock) were reused for Precursors. By 1907 the entire Lady of the Lake class had been scrapped.

== Fleet list ==
Table of Problem or Lady of the Lake class locomotives
LNWR No.	Name	Crewe Works No.	Date built	Date rebuilt	Date scrapped	Notes
184	Problem	424	Nov 1859	Jun 1897	May 1905	
229	Watt	425	Nov 1859	Feb 1898	Nov 1905	
33	Erebus	426	Feb 1860	Feb 1898	Sep 1906	
44	Harlequin	427	Feb 1860	Mar 1898	Jan 1907	
60	Tantalus	428	Mar 1860	Dec 1896	Oct 1904	
61	Phosphorus	429	Mar 1860	Aug 1896	Sep 1906	
77	Mersey	440	May 1860	Mar 1896	Jan 1907	
97	Atalanta	441	May 1860	Jan 1897	Jul 1906	
111	Russell	442	May 1860	Dec 1897	Jul 1906	
134	Owl	443	May 1860	Apr 1896	Oct 1903	
165	Star	464	Nov 1860	May 1897	Feb 1906	
117	Tiger	465	Nov 1860	May 1898	Oct 1905	
222	Lily	466	Nov 1860	Oct 1897	Sep 1906	
196	Leander	467	Nov 1860	May 1896	Jul 1906	
230	Monarch	468	Nov 1860	Sep 1898	Sep 1906	
561	Prince Oscar	489	May 1861	Feb 1899	Apr 1906	
562	Palmerston	490	May 1861	Mar 1898	Jul 1906	
563	Combermere	491	May 1861	Mar 1896	May 1906	
564	Majestic	492	May 1861	Jun 1897	Jun 1907	
565	Napoleon	493	May 1861	Jul 1897	Jan 1906	
234	Mazeppa	524	Nov 1861	May 1898	Mar 1906	
28	Prometheus	525	Nov 1861	Apr 1897	Sep 1906	
1	Saracen	526	Nov 1861	Jun 1897	Jun 1907	
7	Scorpion	527	Nov 1861	Jun 1898	May 1904	
139	Cygnet	528	Nov 1861	Mar 1898	Aug 1906	
218	Wellington	529	Feb 1862	Oct 1898	Jul 1907	
279	Stephenson	530	Feb 1862	Nov 1897	Sep 1906	
531	Lady of the Lake	531	Feb 1862	Nov 1898	Jun 1906	First rebuilt in 1878
291	Prince of Wales	532	Feb 1862	Dec 1895	Sep 1906	Involved in Abergele collision 20 August 1867
127	Peel	533	Mar 1862	Jun 1896	May 1905	
762	Locke	584	Nov 1862	Jun 1898	Feb 1907	
803	Tornado	585	Nov 1862	Dec 1897	Jul 1906	
804	Soult	586	Nov 1862	?	Apr 1898	
754	Ethelred	587	Nov 1862	Jan 1899	Jul 1907	
837	Faerie Queene	588	Nov 1862	Jun 1898	Feb 1906	
827	Victoria	589	Dec 1862	Feb 1897	Mar 1907	
610	Princess Royal	590	Dec 1862	Mar 1899	Feb 1905	
612	Princess Alice	591	Jan 1863	—	Jul 1907	
618	Princess Alexandra	592	Jan 1863	Jun 1898	Nov 1907	
622	Prince Alfred	593	Jan 1863	Jul 1898	Dec 1904	
665	Lord of the Isles	594	Jan 1863	Feb 1896	Jun 1907	
667	Marmion	595	Jan 1863	Feb 1897	Sep 1906	
675	Ivanhoe	596	Feb 1863	Apr 1895	Apr 1906	
802	Red Gauntlet	597	Feb 1863	Apr 1899	Jul 1907	
806	Waverley	598	Feb 1863	Nov 1895	Jan 1905	
818	Havelock	599	Feb 1863	Mar 1897	May 1904	
719	Outram	600	Feb 1863	Apr 1898	Nov 1907	
723	Clive	601	Feb 1863	Sep 1898	Feb 1906	
833	Clyde	602	Feb 1863	Apr 1897	Dec 1906	
834	Elgin	603	Feb 1863	Mar 1898	Sep 1906	
1427	Edith	830	Jul 1865	Nov 1898	Jan 1907	
1428	Eleanor	831	Jul 1865	Nov 1899	Jul 1907	
1429	Alfred Paget	832	Jul 1865	Dec 1897	Dec 1903	
1430	Pandora	833	Jul 1865	Apr 1898	Jul 1905	
1431	Psyche	834	Jul 1865	Jun 1898	Feb 1905	
1432	Panopea	835	Jul 1865	Jun 1899	Jul 1904	
1433	Daphne	836	Jul 1865	—	May 1906	
1434	Eunomia	837	Jul 1865	Jun 1896	Oct 1907	
1435	Fortuna	838	Jul 1865	Dec 1897	Oct 1907	
1436	Egeria	839	Jul 1865	Aug 1896	Aug 1904	
