= LNWR 4ft Shunter =

LNWR 835 and 1201 classes ‘4-foot shunter’
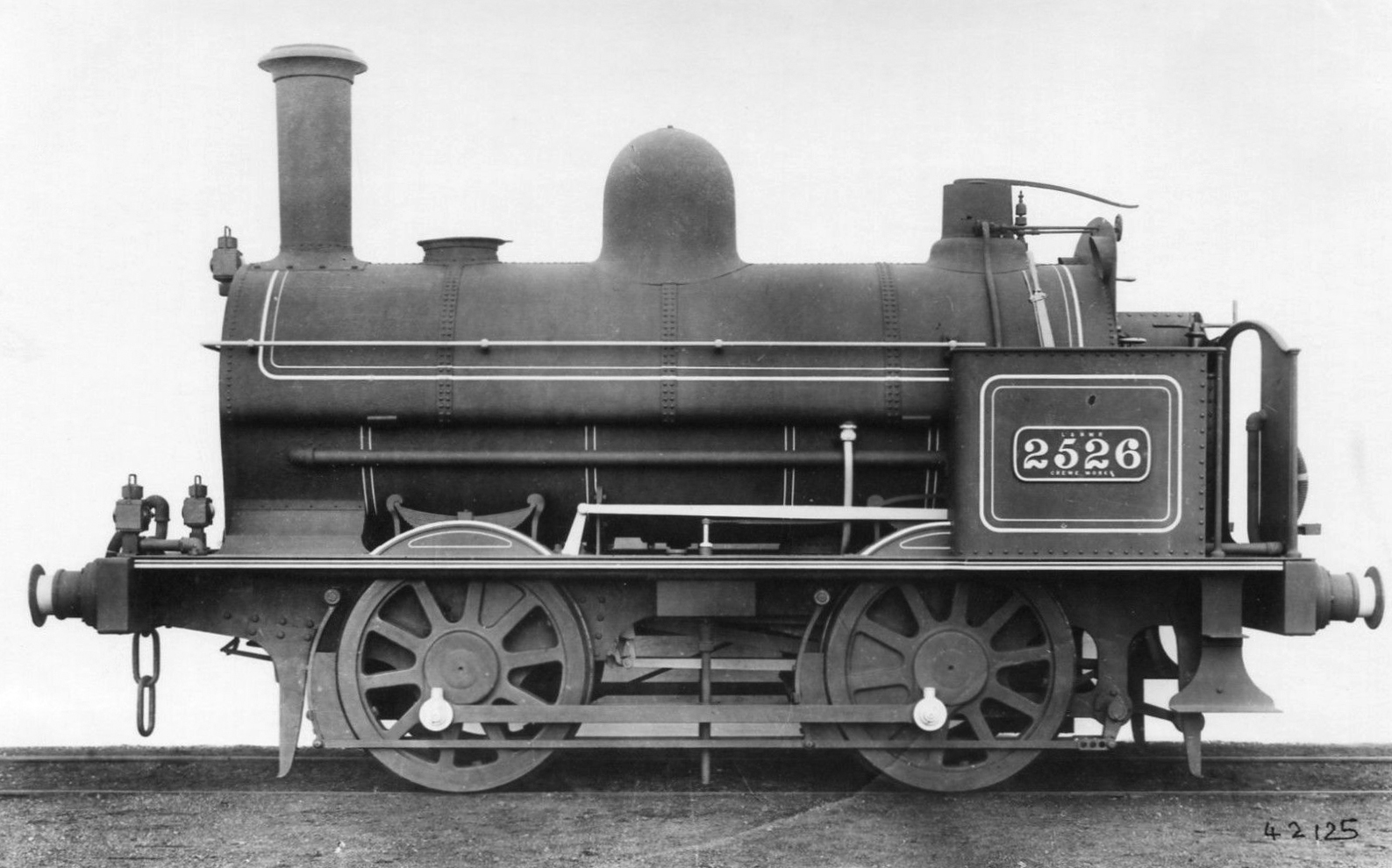
- No. 2526 in photographic grey livery
Type and origin
- Power type: Steam
- Designer: John Ramsbottom
- Builder: Crewe Works
- Build date: 1863–70 (36), 1872 (10), 1892 (10)
- Total produced: 56
Specifications
- Configuration
  - Whyte: 0-4-0ST, 0-4-2CT
  - UIC: B n2tG, B1 n2tG
- Gauge: 4 ft 8 1/2 in (1,435 mm)
- Driver dia.: 4 ft 0 in (1.219 m)
- Wheelbase: 8 ft 0 in (2.44 m)
- Loco weight: 24.70 long tons (25.10 t)
- Water cap.: 504 imp gal (2,290 L; 605 US gal)
- Boiler pressure: 120 lbf/in^{2} (830 kPa)
- Heating surface: 415 sq ft (38.6 m^{2})
- Cylinder size: 14 in × 20 in (356 mm × 508 mm)
Performance figures
- Tractive effort: 8,075 lbf (35.92 kN)
Career
- Operators: London and North Western Railway; London, Midland and Scottish Railway
- Withdrawn: 1925-1933
- Disposition: One preserved, remainder scrapped

The London and North Western Railway (LNWR) 4 ft Shunter was a class of 0-4-0ST steam locomotives. Introduced in 1863 by Ramsbottom, 26 were built in 1863–1865, 10 in 1870, 10 in 1872, and 10 in 1892. The last three of the latter batch were soon rebuilt as 0-4-2ST crane tanks. They survived into LMS ownership in 1923, and the last one was withdrawn in 1933.

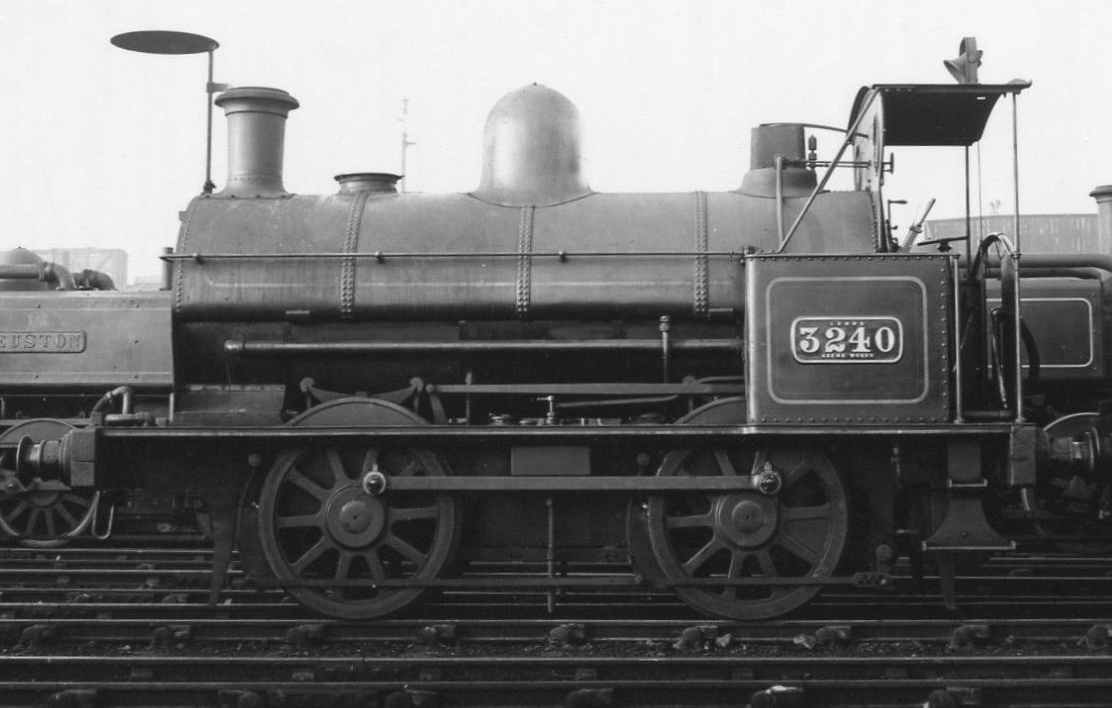
No. 3240, 1201 Class

Unusually, they were fitted with launch-type boilers. These have a cylindrical furnace, rather than a conventional locomotive firebox. This limits the grate area and ashpan size, although this is not a limitation for short-range shunters. One advantage is that the ashpan does not project downwards, making it possible to place the rear axle further back. For a dock shunter operating on tight radius curves, this is useful, as it reduces the rear overhang and so the amount by which the coupling and buffers swing sideways on curves.

== Preservation ==
One example survives in the NRM collection, kept at the Ribble Steam Railway.

1439 was built at Crewe in 1865. Re-numbered as 3042, it worked on the Liverpool Docks railway system, with oil fuel apparatus and a warning bell for use on the roadway lines. After the outbreak of World War I in 1914, it was loaned to the Kynoch shell factory at Witton, Birmingham and re-numbered 4. The larger round buffers, typical for small shunters, were fitted at this time.

After the war, Kynoch purchased the locomotive and kept it in service. In 1935, it was given a new boiler by W. G. Bagnall, a noted maker of small launch-type boilers, with an increased working pressure of 160 psi (1,100 kPa) and the original Ramsbottom safety valve replaced by two Pop safety valves. It became surplus in 1953, and was given to the BTC in 1954 for the beginnings of the National Railway Museum collection as the only surviving example of an original Ramsbottom locomotive (as Cornwall was one he rebuilt). Since January 2009, it has been displayed at the Ribble Steam Railway.
