= Dewrance & Co. Ltd =

English manufacturing company

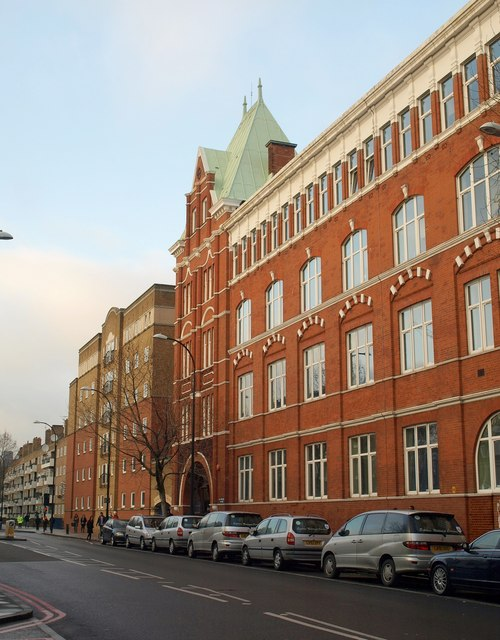
- Great Dover Street HQ, now student apartments
- Industry: Engineering
- Founded: 1835; 191 years ago in London
- Founder: John Dewrance (senior); Joseph Woods
- Fate: Acquired by Babcock & Wilcox Ltd
- Products: Boiler tubes, valves, gauges

Dewrance & Co. Ltd was a manufacturer of engine and boiler accessories, such as pumps and gauges.

== History ==
It was established in London in 1835 as a partnership by Joseph Woods, with John Dewrance. It was involved in the building of the locomotive Lion in 1838 for the Liverpool and Manchester Railway. In 1844 after Wood's death the firm became a company specialising in manufacturing engine and boiler accessories. It produced a brass pressure gauge for Lloyd's Register of shipping to pressure-test ships' boilers before insuring them. Such gauges have become collectable. A pair are on display at the Internal Fire – Museum of Power.

Dewrance died in 1861 and left the business to his son. The firm's introduction of the groove-packed plug cock in 1875 was a major innovation because it made steam safety valves easier to operate. Sir John Dewrance, who was married to the granddaughter of Richard Trevithick took over the business in 1879. In 1937 after Dewrance's death it became a wholly owned subsidiary of Babcock & Wilcox Ltd.

In 1961 it had 2,000 employees.

The firm was sold by Dresser Industries in 1998 to Tyco International. It was then operating from Skelmersdale.

== Dewrance family ==
=== John Dewrance ===
John Dewrance conducted experiments on the distribution of heat in steam boilers. There are claims he was responsible for the construction of George Stephenson’s locomotive the Rocket and for supporting it at the Rainhill trials. (Note: The single current source with the Rocket claim may not be independent, and some may claim this was unlikely. If Dewrance could be linked with George Stephenson's firm then association with the Rocket might be entirely possible and his positioned at the L&MR to aid servicing of Stephenson's locomotives would then be very reasonable but there is no current sourcing to support this.) He was appointed Locomotive Superintendent of the Liverpool and Manchester Railway from 1840 to 1844 during which time his 2-2-2 designs at the Edge Hil workshops were noted for their neatness.

In October 1845 he entered the employ of the Great Southern and Western Railway of Ireland and was selected from three candidates as Locomotive Superintendent in March 1847 at a salary of £300 pera anuum with housing assistance. (Note: The 1974 work Murray and MacNeill claim Dewrance was Locomotive Superintendent or equivalent since 1844.) He was immediately seconded to locomotive manufacturer William Fairbairn & Sons, Millwall, London to gain experience. Following a review in October 1947 his services were dispensed with due to claim his remuneration was inappropriately high for his abilities. He was then appointed Locomotive Superintendent by the rival Midland Great Western Railway (MGWR) of Ireland, again for £300 per annum with a house in Cabra Road, Dublin. Following the decision of the MGWR director's to let the operation of the line Dewrance was released with three months salary.

Dewrance died in 1861 and left the business to his son.

=== Sir John Dewrance ===
Sir John Dewrance, who was educated at Charterhouse and then at King's College London before marrying the granddaughter of Richard Trevithick, took over the business in 1879. He took out 114 patents relating to steam fittings and boiler mountings. He was involved with the Primrose League. In 1899 he became chairman of Babcock & Wilcox Ltd. From 1920 to 1926 he was the President of the Engineering Employers’ Federation.

Dewrance died in 1937 with the firm becoming a wholly owned subsidiary of Babcock & Wilcox Ltd.

The Sir John Dewrance prize is awarded to the two best mechanical engineering students each year at City University.

== Recognition ==
One of the GWR Hawthorn Class locomotives built by Slaughter, Grüning and Company was named after the company in 1865. British Empire Medals were awarded to Arthur Edgar Caswallon Evans, a Brass Turner in the 1946 New Year Honours, to Jasper Sidney Jeal, a Centre Lathe Turner in the 1953 Coronation Honours and to Maud Unwin, a Fettler, in the 1956 New Year Honours. James McWaters Storey, the Managing Director, was appointed Commander of the Order of the British Empire in the 1959 New Year Honours.

The firm's archives are held in the British National Archives.
