= John Dewrance =

British inventor and mechanical engineer

Sir John Dewrance GBE FKC
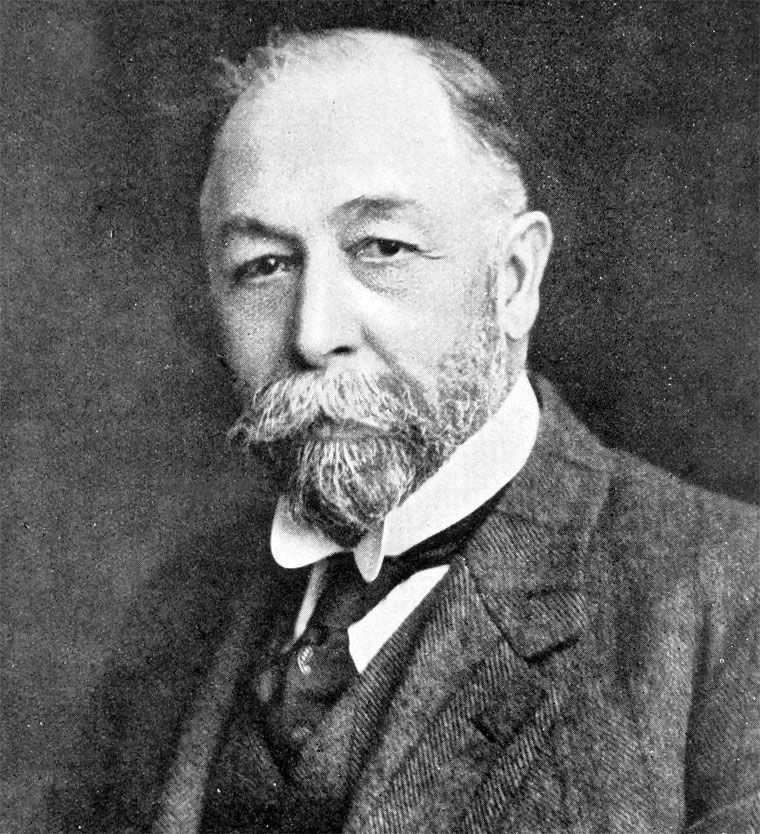
- Born: 13 March 1858; Peckham, London
- Died: 7 October 1937 (aged 79); Wretham Hall, Wayland, Thetford, Norfolk
- Citizenship: Great Britain
- Education: King's College, London
- Known for: Chairman of Dewrance & Co. Ltd
- Scientific career
- Fields: Chemistry, electrometallurgy, mechanical engineering
- Workplaces: Institution of Mechanical Engineers

Sir John Dewrance (13 March 1858 – 7 October 1937) was a British inventor and mechanical engineer.

== Early life ==
John Dewrance was born in 1858 at Peckham, London, the only son of pioneering locomotive engineer John Dewrance and his wife Elizabeth. Dewrance was educated at Charterhouse School before entering King's College, London, where he is said to have "paid special attention to chemistry".

== Career ==
In 1879 Dewrence took over the running of Dewrance & Co. Ltd from his father. The following year he took over the research laboratory and staff of Professor Frederick Barff, where he experimented on protecting iron from rust. Dewrance built a formidable body of research early in his career, focussing particularly on lubrication, metallurgy and corrosion; this was reflected in his stints as Chairman of the Alloys Research Committee, Research Advisory Committee, Cutting Tools Research Committee as well as the Finance and House Committee of the Institute of Mechanical Engineers.

Dewrance went on to enjoy exceptional success as an inventor and mechanical engineer, taking out a total of 114 patents relating to steam fittings and boiler mountings. In 1889 he was elected Chairman of Babcock and Wilcox Ltd, and in 1914 Chairman of Deal and Walmer Coalfield Ltd and Kent Coal Concessions Ltd, holding all of these positions until his retirement in July 1937. Dewrance was engaged on Government contracts during the First World War, serving on committees of the Ministry of Munitions, the Ministry of Labour and the Treasury. He was first knighted in 1920.

Other major appointments for Dewrance included a tenure as President of the Engineering and Allied Employers' National Federation between 1920 and 1926, President of the Institution of Mechanical Engineers and Master of the Armourers' and Brasiers' Company in 1923, High Sheriff of Kent in 1925, and President of the Institute of Metals between 1926 and 1928. Dewrance was made a Fellow of King's College in 1929, where he also sat on the Council until his retirement.

== Personal life ==
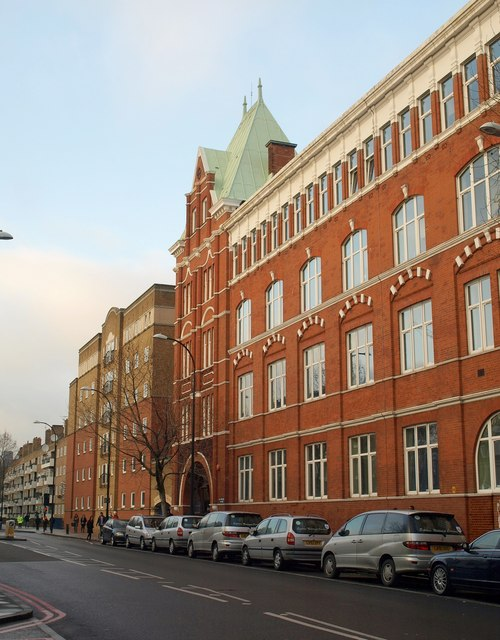
The former Dewrance & Co. building is now a King's College hall of residence

Dewrance married Isabella Ann, granddaughter of inventor and mining engineer Richard Trevithick, in 1882. They had a son and a daughter.

Dewrance enjoyed riding, shooting and deerstalking in his personal life, and was involved with the Primrose League. He was appointed a Knight Commander of the Order of the British Empire (KBE) in 1920 in recognition of war service, and promoted to Knight Grand Cross of the Order (GBE) in the 1928 Birthday Honours.

== Legacy ==
Dewrance & Co. Ltd became a wholly owned subsidiary of Babcock & Wilcox Ltd following Dewrance's death in 1937. By sheer coincidence, the former Dewrance & Co. headquarters on Great Dover Street now forms part of a King's College hall of residence.

The Sir John Dewrance prize is awarded to the two best mechanical engineering students each year at City, University of London.
