= LNWR Samson Class =

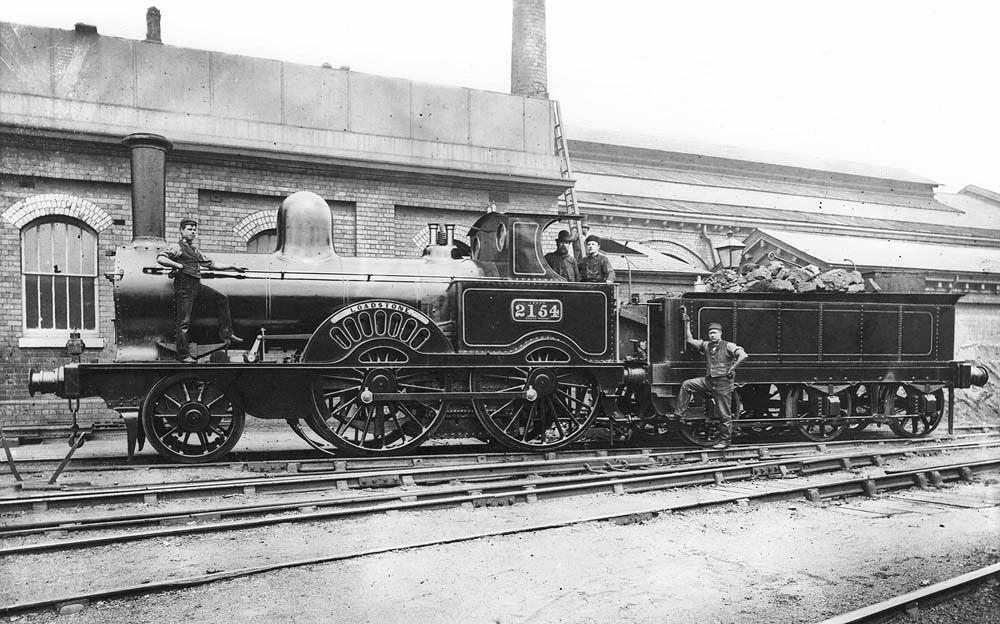
- 2154 Loadstone at Monument Lane locomotive depot
Type and origin
- Power type: Steam
- Designer: John Ramsbottom
- Builder: Crewe Works
- Serial number: 624–633, 680–689, 730–739, 780–789, 880–889, 1692–1701, 1842–1861, 2279–2288
- Build date: May 1863 – May 1879
- Total produced: 90
Specifications
- Configuration
  - Whyte: 2-4-0
  - UIC: 1B n2
- Gauge: 4 ft 8 1/2 in (1,435 mm)
- Leading dia.: 3 ft 6 in (1.067 m)
- Driver dia.: 6 ft 3 in (1.905 m)
- Wheelbase
  - Engine: 14 ft 7 in (4.445 m)
  - Leading: 7 ft 5 in (2.261 m)
  - Coupled: 7 ft 2 in (2.184 m)
- Loco weight: 26 long tons 2 cwt (26.5 t)
- Water cap.: 1,500 imp gal (6,800 L; 1,800 US gal)
- Boiler
  - Diameter: 3 ft 9 1/8 in (1.146 m)
  - Tube plates: 9 ft 8 3/8 in (2.956 m)
- Boiler pressure: 140 lbf/in^{2} (970 kPa; 9.8 kgf/cm^{2})
- Heating surface: 1,083 sq ft (100.6 m^{2})
- Cylinders: Two, inside
- Cylinder size: 16 in × 20 in (406 mm × 508 mm)
- Valve gear: Stephenson
Performance figures
- Tractive effort: 8,700 lbf (38.70 kN)
Career
- Operators: London and North Western Railway
- Withdrawn: September 1889 – November 1894, 1914 - 1925
- Disposition: All scrapped

The LNWR Samson Class was a class of ninety 2-4-0 steam locomotives built by the London and North Western Railway at their Crewe Works between 1863 and 1879.

They were officially designated "Curved Link 6-ft Passenger" due to the use of Stephenson valve gear which included a curved expansion link between the fore and back eccentric rods (earlier LNWR designs had used the Allan valve gear which had a straight expansion link) and the use of 6-foot (1.829 m) diameter wheel centres, which, together with 1 1/2-inch (38 mm) thick tyres gave a driving wheel diameter of 6 feet 3 inches (1.905 m).

Ostensibly a mixed traffic design, they were the first locomotives with coupled driving wheels to be allocated for passenger duties on the LNWR.

== History ==
They were designed by John Ramsbottom who had fifty built, all without cabs and with pierced driving wheel splashers. Ramsbottom's successor F. W. Webb, built forty more, all with cabs. The earlier locomotives also gained cabs, and all eventually had their splashers filled in.

All ninety locomotives were 'renewed' (replaced) by a like number of Waterloo Class locomotives between 1889 and 1905, but only eighty were scrapped quickly. The ten exceptions were transferred to the Civil Engineer's list, and these were withdrawn between 1914 and 1925. No examples have been preserved.

== Fleet list ==
List of LNWR Samson class locomotives
LNWR No.	LNWR Name	Crewe Works No.	Date built	Date scrapped	Notes
633	Samson	624	May 1863	January 1892	
634	Ellesmere	625	May 1863	December 1892	
733	Chimera	626	May 1863	January 1890	
735	Charon	627	May 1863	January 1892	
738	Terrier	628	May 1863	January 1890	
752	Glowworm	629	May 1863	December 1892	
757	Banshee	630	May 1863	January 1892	
758	Hardman	631	May 1863	January 1890	
763	Violet	632	May 1863	May 1893	
821	Diomed	633	May 1863	January 1892	
901	Hero	680	January 1864	October 1890	
902	Onyx	681	February 1864	March 1893	
628	Tartarus	682	February 1864	April 1894	
724	Eden	683	February 1864	December 1892	
748	Waterloo	684	February 1864	November 1889	
764	Shap	685	February 1864	December 1892	
792	Theorem	686	February 1864	June 1893	
793	Martin	687	February 1864	May 1894	
794	Woodlark	688	March 1864	August 1894	
795	Falstaff	689	March 1864	October 1893	
731	Croxteth	730	July 1864	November 1889	
732	Hecla	731	July 1864	August 1894	
736	Memnon	732	July 1864	January 1892	
737	Roberts	733	July 1864	May 1894	
739	Sutherland	734	July 1864	April 1894	
742	Spitfire	735	July 1864	December 1892	
828	Tubal	736	July 1864	July 1890	
829	Turk	737	August 1864	January 1892	
830	Trent	738	August 1864	January 1890	
642	Bee	739	August 1864	August 1890	
81	Greystock	780	January 1865	January 1892	Renamed Greystoke c.1884
1045	Whitworth	781	January 1865	September 1889	
401	Zeno	782	January 1865	March 1894	
404	Zophyrus	783	January 1865	March 1894	
418	Zygia	784	January 1865	December 1892	
419	Zillah	785	February 1865	January 1890	
35	Talisman	786	February 1865	October 1890	
36	Thalaba	787	February 1865	October 1890	
124	Marquis Douro	788	February 1865	December 1892	
231	Firefly	789	February 1865	June 1890	
609	The Earl of Chester	880	January 1866	April 1893	
632	Ostrich	881	December 1865	June 1890	
746	Castor	882	January 1866	1894	
814	Henrietta	883	January 1866	January 1890	
817	Constance	884	January 1866	April 1893	
819	Puck	885	January 1866	December 1892	
824	Adelaide	886	January 1866	April 1893	
832	Sanspareil	887	January 1866	May 1893	
934	North Star	888	January 1866	March 1892	
935	Planet	889	January 1866	May 1893	
414	Prospero	1692	September 1873		To duplicate list as 3271 in 1895; to Civil Engineer's Dept in 1903 as Engineer Lancaster; withdrawn 1924.
424	Sirius	1693	September 1873		To duplicate list as 3206 in 1895; to Civil Engineer's Dept in 1899 as Engineer Crewe; withdrawn 1914.
604	Narcissus	1694	September 1873	November 1890	
635	Zamiel	1695	September 1873	January 1890	
636	Eclipse	1696	September 1873	April 1893	
285	Phalaris	1697	September 1873	December 1892	
444	Typhoon	1698	September 1873	November 1890	
445	Ixion	1699	September 1873	December 1892	
446	Siren	1700	September 1873	April 1893	
805	Caliban	1701	September 1873	April 1893	
434	St. Patrick	1842	October 1871	April 1890	
468	Wildfire	1843	October 1874	November 1890	
469	St. George	1844	October 1874	June 1893	
485	Euxine	1845	October 1874	December 1892	
486	Skiddaw	1846	October 1874	June 1893	
487	John O’Groat	1847	October 1874		To duplicate list as 3199 in 1894; to Civil Engineer's Dept in 1895 as Spare Engine, to Engineer Liverpool in 1903; withdrawn 1921.
631	Hotspur	1848	October 1874		To duplicate list as 3273 in 1896; to Civil Engineer's Dept in 1901 as Engineer Manchester; withdrawn 1914.
1163	John O’Gaunt	1849	October 1874	November 1894	
90	Luck of Edenhall	1850	October 1874	March 1894	
885	Vampire	1851	October 1874		To duplicate list as 3269 in 1895; to Civil Engineer's Dept in 1897; became Spare Engine in 1923; withdrawn 1925.
2150	Atlas	1852	November 1874	June 1893	
2151	Baltic	1853	November 1874		To duplicate list as 3268 in 1895; to Civil Engineer's Dept in 1901 as Engineer Walsall; withdrawn 1923.
2152	Sybil	1854	November 1874	March 1894	
2153	Isis	1855	November 1874	April 1893	
2154	Loadstone	1856	November 1874	November 1893	
2155	Liver	1857	November 1874	August 1894	
2156	Sphinx	1858	November 1874	November 1894	
2157	Unicorn	1859	November 1874		To duplicate list as 3272 in 1895; to Civil Engineer's Dept in 1905 as Spare Engine; withdrawn 1923.
2158	Serpent	1860	January 1874	August 1894	
2159	Shark	1861	November 1874	March 1894	
2350	Centaur	2279	May 1879		Renumbered 773 in 1879; to duplicate list as 3200 in 1894; to Civil Engineer's Dept in 1895 as Engineer Watford; withdrawn 1923.
2351	Saddleback	2280	May 1879	April 1893	Renumbered 1162 in 1879.
2352	Odin	2281	May 1879	November 1894	Renumbered 1164 in 1879.
2353	Wyre	2282	June 1879		Renumbered 1166 in 1879; to duplicate list as 3270 in 1895; to Civil Engineer's Dept in 1902 as Engineer Bangor; withdrawn 1925.
2354	Cuckoo	2283	July 1879	March 1894	Renumbered 1168 in 1879.
2355	Kestrel	2284	May 1879	November 1894	Renumbered 852 in 1879.
2356	Petrel	2285	May 1879		Renumbered 209 in 1879; to duplicate list as 3198 in 1894, transferred to Civil Engineer's Dept in 1902 as Engineer Northampton; withdrawn 1923
2357	Medea	2286	May 1879	November 1894	Renumbered 995 in 1879.
2358	Mastodon	2287	May 1879	January 1892	Renumbered 479 in 1879.
2359	Pheasant	2288	May 1879	June 1894	Renumbered 263 in 1879.
