= LNWR DX Goods Class =

British class of 0-6-0 steam locomotives

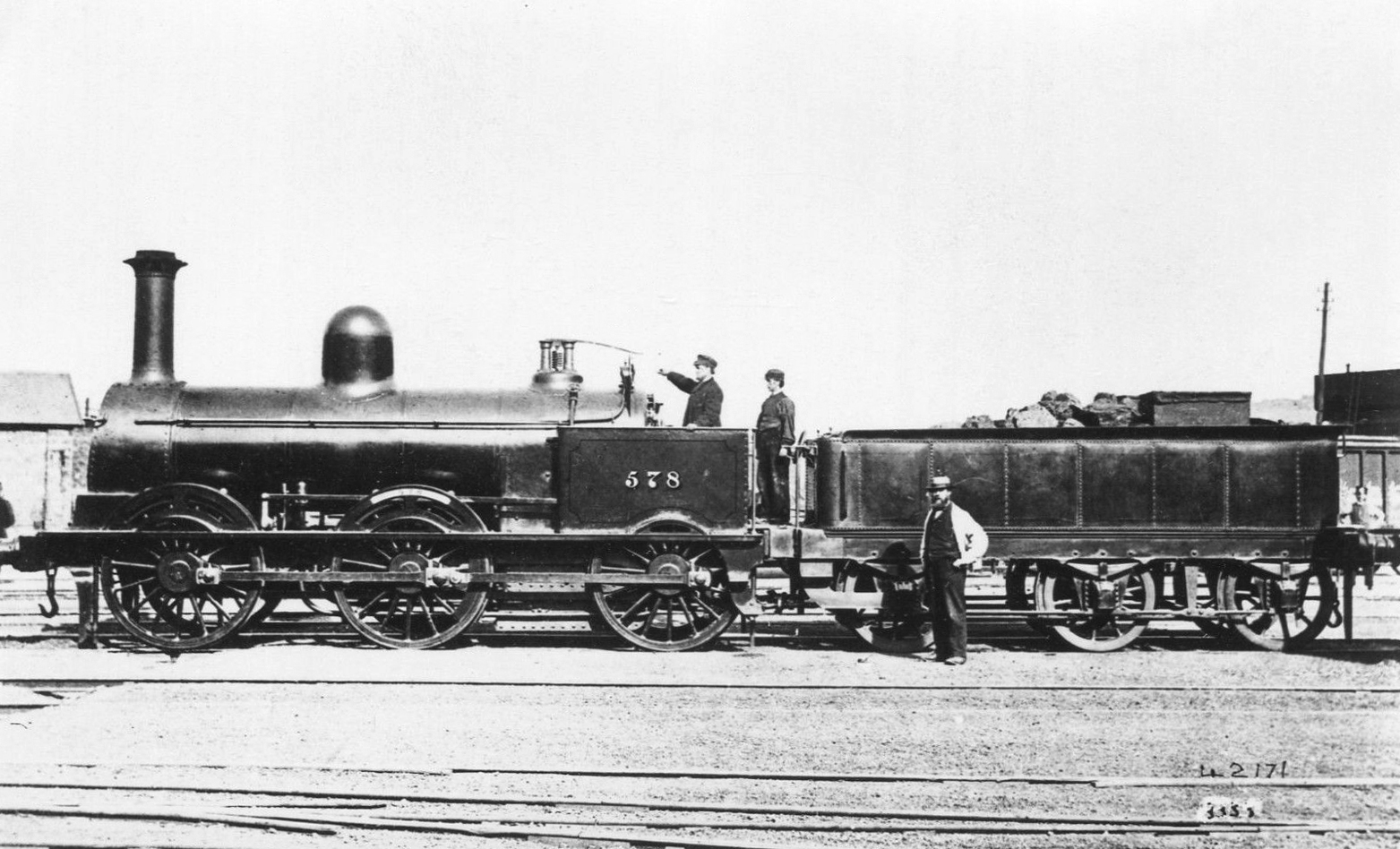
- No. 578 in original condition and livery
Type and origin
- Power type: Steam
- Designer: John Ramsbottom
- Builder: Crewe works
- Build date: 1858–1874
- Total produced: 943
Specifications
- Configuration
  - Whyte: 0-6-0
- Gauge: 4 ft 8 1/2 in (1,435 mm)
- Driver dia.: 5 ft 2 in (1.575 m)
- Total weight: 27 long tons (27.4 t; 30.2 short tons) (29 long tons (29.5 t; 32.5 short tons) when fueled)
- Water cap.: 2,000 imp gal (9,100 L)
- Firebox
  - Grate area: 15 sq ft (1.4 m^{2}) or 17.1 sq ft (1.59 m^{2})
- Boiler: 4 ft 2 in (1.27 m) diameter x 10 ft 6 in (3.20 m) length
- Boiler pressure: 120 psi (0.83 MPa); 150 psi (1.03 MPa) (Special DX)
- Heating surface: 1,074 sq ft (99.8 m^{2})
- Cylinders: two, inside
- Cylinder size: 17 in × 24 in (430 mm × 610 mm) (bore × stroke)
- Valve gear: Stephenson
Performance figures
- Tractive effort: 11,410 lbf (50.8 kN)
Career
- Operators: London and North Western Railway, Lancashire and Yorkshire Railway, London, Midland and Scottish Railway
- Withdrawn: 1902–1930
- Disposition: All scrapped

The London and North Western Railway (LNWR) DX Goods class was a class of 0-6-0 steam locomotive, designed by John Ramsbottom for freight duties. 943 were constructed, making them the largest single class of steam locomotives built in the United Kingdom. Despite this, none were preserved.

== History ==
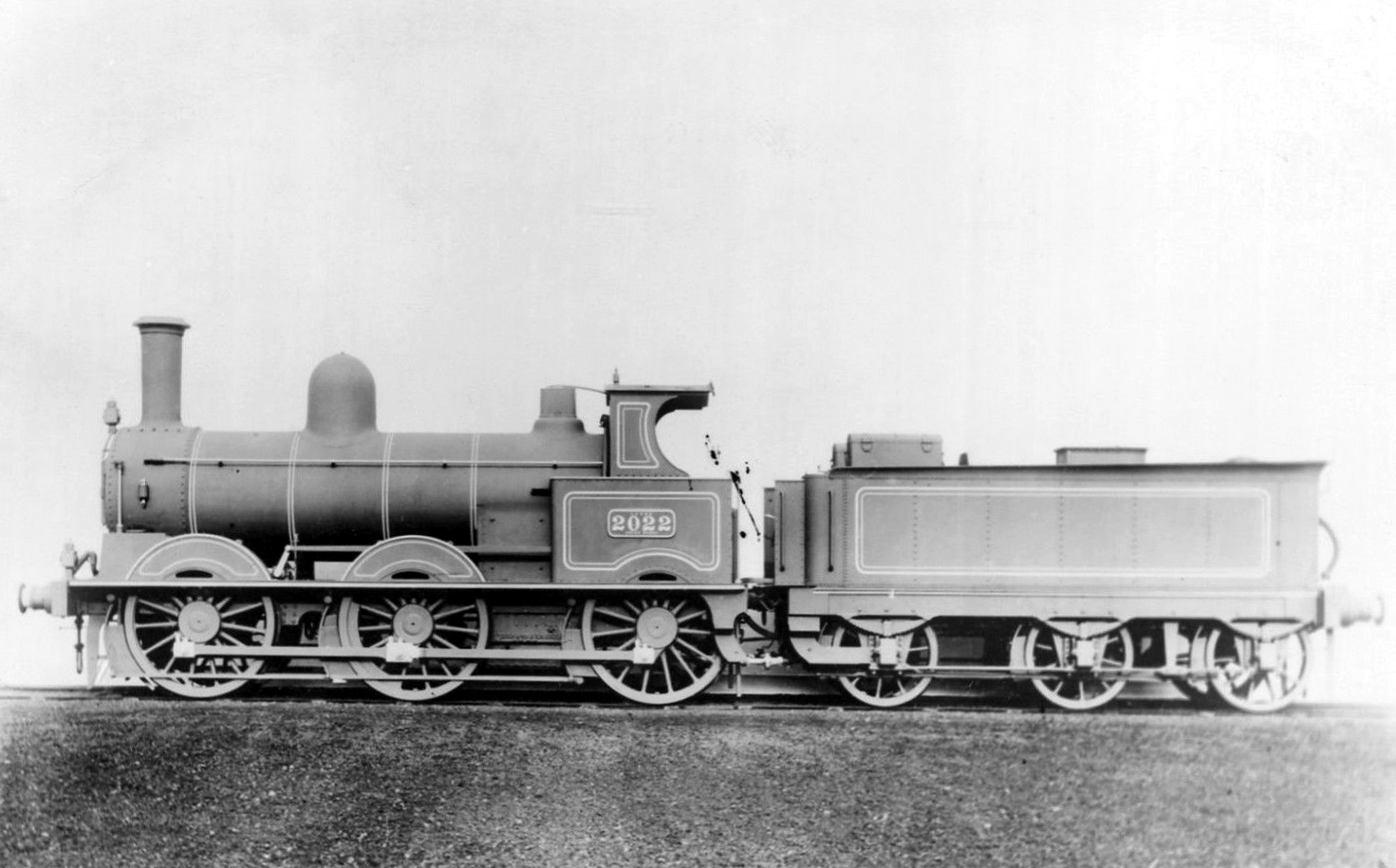
No. 2022 Francis Webb rebuild, Special DX in photographic grey livery

The "DX" goods engine was the first original design produced by Ramsbottom, shortly after becoming Locomotive Superintendent of the Northern Division. An experimental prototype was developed at Longsight whilst Ramsbottom was only in charge of the North-Eastern Division. The first regular example was completed at Crewe Works in September 1858, and was given the running number 355. This was the 399th locomotive built at Crewe, but it was the practice of the LNWR to reuse the numbers of withdrawn locomotives.

The first DX, No. 355, was named Hardman, and carried the name on a curved brass plate above the driving wheels. It was painted in the same dark green livery as used by Ramsbottom's predecessor, Francis Trevithick, but edged with a single black line. Fifty-four of the early DX locomotives were given names, but all were removed by 1864, with some re-used on passenger locomotives.

Four 0-4-2 versions of this locomotive type were built by Robert Stephenson and supplied to the Sydney Railway Company in 1855 as the first motive power for the new railway company. They were virtually identical in specification, except for slightly larger 5 ft 6 in (1.676 m) driving wheels and smaller 16-inch (410 mm) diameter cylinders.

Table of named locomotives
LNWR No.	Name	Crewe Works No.	Date built	Notes
355	Hardman	399	Sep 1858	
357	Terrier	400	Sep 1858	
358	Falstaff	401	Oct 1858	
359	Glowworm	403	Nov 1858	
87	Eden	404	May 1859	
39	Tantalus	405	May 1859	
428	Trevithick	406	May 1859	
429	Roberts	407	May 1859	
447	Whitworth	408	May 1859	
210	Alchymist	409	Jun 1859	
369	Banshee	410	Jun 1859	
240	Bee	418	Oct 1859	
120	Samson	419	Nov 1859	
261	Hercules	420	Nov 1859	
266	Sutherland	422	Nov 1859	
245	Ellesmere	423	Nov 1859	
206	Menai	432	Apr 1860	
531	Lady of the Lake	433	Apr 1860	Renumbered 494 and name removed in Feb 1862
345	Turk	434	Apr 1860	
215	Spitfire	435	Apr 1860	
283	Croxteth	436	Apr 1860	
296	Bellerophon	437	May 1860	
293	Quick Silver	438	May 1860	
312	Tubal	439	May 1860	
192	Hero	444	Aug 1860	
211	Onyx	445	Aug 1860	
220	Waterloo	446	Aug 1860	
221	Trafalgar	448	Aug 1860	
52	Diomed	449	Sep 1860	
2	Hecla	450	Sep 1860	
237	Blenheim	451	Sep 1860	
121	Buffalo	452	Sep 1860	
123	Victory	453	Sep 1860	
183	Theorem	454	Sep 1860	
177	Chimera	455	Sep 1860	
216	Ambassador	456	Oct 1860	
224	Violet	469	Feb 1861	
280	Glendower	470	Feb 1861	
278	Locke	471	Feb 1861	
442	Forerunner	479	Mar 1861	
236	Hawkstone	483	Apr 1861	
356	Memnon	485	Apr 1861	
568	Stewart	498	Aug 1861	
129	Martin	510	Sep 1861	
65	Charon	513	Oct 1861	
125	Soho	522	Nov 1861	
130	Heron	523	Nov 1861	
325	Chandos	547	May 1862	
147	Woodlark	548	May 1862	
135	Bat	549	May 1862	
343	Etna	550	May 1862	
368	Majestic	551	May 1862	
34	Phoebus	552	May 1862	
532	Grasmere	553	May 1862	

857 examples of Ramsbottom’s standard goods design were built for the LNWR at Crewe Works between 1858 and 1872. The class has been described as "the earliest example of standardization [sic?] and mass productions of locomotives on a large scale," and "a remarkable instance of standardisation at a time when most railways had many different classes, each class with only few engines." During the 1870s, driving cabs were added. 278 examples of a saddle tank version of the design were built after 1870, known as the LNWR Special Tank.

In addition to the 857 examples used by the LNWR, a further 86 examples of the original design were constructed at Crewe for the Lancashire and Yorkshire Railway (LYR) between 1871 and 1874. This alarmed independent locomotive manufacturers, who sought an injunction to stop the practice; it was granted on 16 December 1875.

The 943 locomotives were all built at Crewe as follows:

Construction
Years built	Crewe numbers	Quantity	Notes
1858–1859	399–423	25	
1860	430–439	10	
1860	444–463	20	
1861	469–488	20	
1861	494–523	30	
1862	534–583	50	
1863	604–623	20	
1863	634–673	40	
1864	690–729	40	
1864	740–759	20	
1864	770–779	10	
1865	790–829	40	
1865	850–879	30	
1866	890–919	30	
1866	930–979	50	
1866–1868	1000–1159	160	
1868–1869	1180–1279	100	
1870	1320–1329	10	
1870–1871	1340–1379	40	
1871	1386–1433	48	last 6 sold to LYR after initial use on LNWR
1872	1489–1498	10	new to LYR
1872	1499–1508	10	Webb modifications
1872	1512–1531	20	Webb modifications
1872	1532–1541	10	new to LYR
1872	1542–1561	20	Webb modifications
1872	1582–1601	20	Webb modifications
1873	1602–1621	20	Webb modifications; new to LYR
1873–1874	1722–1761	40	Webb modifications; new to LYR

Crewe numbers 1428–33 (total 6), delivered new to the LNWR in October 1871, were sold to the LYR in November 1871. Crewe numbers 1489–98, 1532–41, 1602–21 and 1722–61 (total 80) were delivered new to the LYR. Most of those built from 1872 onwards (total 130) incorporated modifications by Francis Webb such as being fitted with cabs.

From April 1881, Webb rebuilt 500 examples with a new 150 psi boiler and vacuum brakes for working passenger trains. These became known as 'Special' (or vacuum) DX's.

== Accidents and incidents ==
- On 12 January 1899, locomotive 1418 was hauling a freight train that was derailed at Penmaenmawr railway station, Caernarfonshire due to the trackbed being washed away in a storm. Both locomotive crew were killed.

== Withdrawals ==
Withdrawals began in 1902, but there were still 88 engines in existence at the time of the London, Midland and Scottish Railway's formation in 1923. The last survivor was withdrawn in 1930. Despite the large number of the class produced, all were scrapped.

== Engines converted to other uses ==
The chassis of a withdrawn DX Goods locomotive was repurposed as a stationary engine on the Sheep Pasture Incline of the Cromford and High Peak Railway in February 1884 but was replaced by an electric winch in 1964.

== Engines sold abroad ==
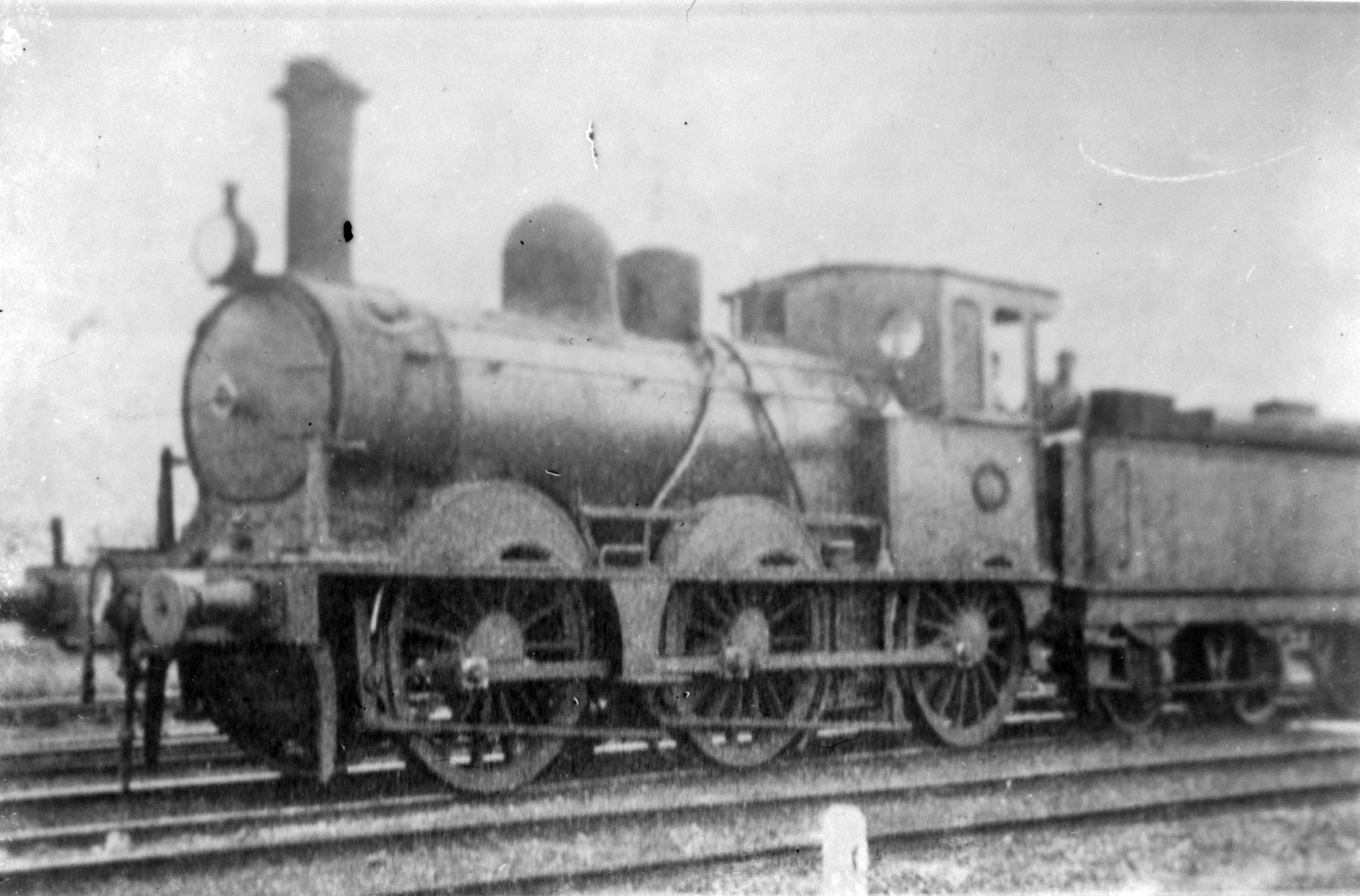
Malines à Terneuzen No. 18

Between 1900 and 1901, four LNWR Special DX were sold to the Société Anonyme du Chemin de Fer International de Malines à Terneuzen, a private railway between Belgium and the Netherlands. They were renumbered 15, 16, 17 and 18. Three of them were rebuilt between 1910 and 1911 with larger cabs of Belgian design and all of them were fitted with Westinghouse brakes sometimes after 1911. One of them (number 15) was still on the active roster in 1948 when the Malines - Terneuzen was taken over by SNCB. All the M.T. engines were then scrapped.
