= LNWR Waterloo Class =

Class of British steam locomotives

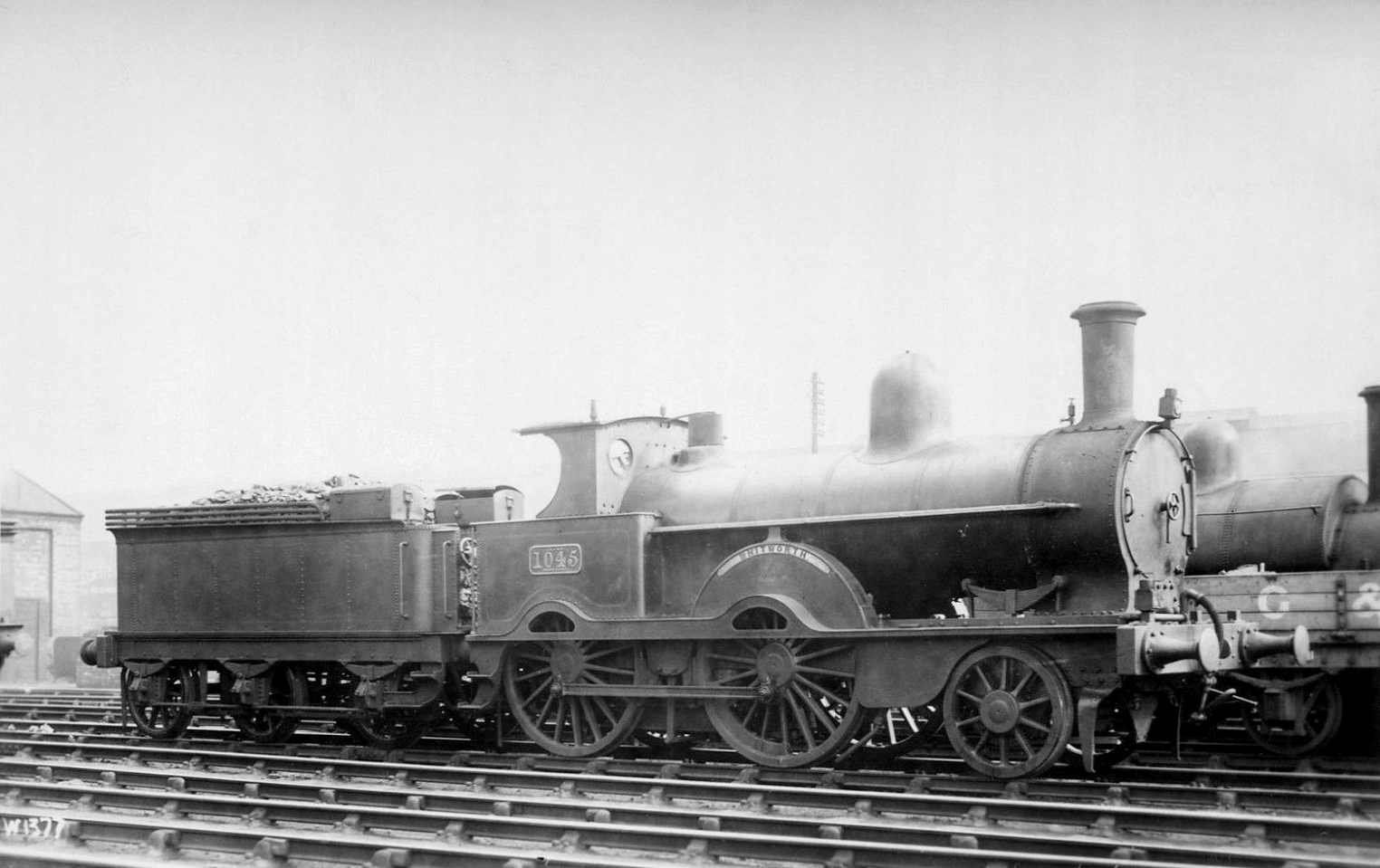
- No. 1045 Whitworth
Type and origin
- Power type: Steam
- Designer: F. W. Webb
- Builder: Crewe Works
- Serial number: 3112–3141, 3354–3363, 3365–3384, 3441–3470
- Build date: 1889–1896
- Total produced: 90
Specifications
- Configuration
  - Whyte: 2-4-0
  - UIC: 1B n2
- Gauge: 4 ft 8 1/2 in (1,435 mm)
- Leading dia.: 3 ft 9 in (1.143 m)
- Driver dia.: 6 ft 3 in (1.905 m)
- Wheelbase: Coupled: 8 ft 5 in (2.57 m); Loco: 15 ft 10 in (4.83 m)
- Loco weight: 36.05 long tons (36.63 t)
- Fuel type: Coal
- Boiler pressure: 150 lbf/in^{2} (1.03 MPa)
- Heating surface: 1,102 sq ft (102.4 m^{2})
- Cylinders: Two
- Cylinder size: 17 in × 24 in (432 mm × 610 mm)
- Valve gear: Allan
Performance figures
- Tractive effort: 12,283 lbf (54.6 kN)
Career
- Operators: London and North Western Railway; London, Midland and Scottish Railway
- Class: Waterloo or Whitworth
- Power class: LMS: 1P
- Number in class: 1 January 1923: 30
- Withdrawn: 1907–1936
- Disposition: All scrapped.

The London and North Western Railway (LNWR) Waterloo Class was a class of 2-4-0 steam locomotives that was also known as the Whitworth Class.

== History ==
The locomotives were introduced by F. W. Webb in 1889 as replacements for the Samson class, and 90 examples were built up to 1896.

The LNWR reused numbers and names from withdrawn locomotives, with the result that the numbering system was completely haphazard.

Withdrawals had started in 1907, following George Whale's succession of Francis Webb in 1903 and the introduction of Whale's stronger Precursor and Experiment tender engines. Thirty locomotives passed to the London, Midland and Scottish Railway at the 1923 grouping. They were given the power classification 1P, and renumbered 5080–5109. In addition, four other members of the class survived in departmental service.

The last Waterloo was withdrawn in 1936. None were preserved.

== Accidents and incidents ==
- On 22 December 1894, a gust of wind blew a wagon into a rake of wagons at Chelford, Cheshire. They were derailed and fouled the main line. Locomotive No. 418 Zygia was one of two hauling an express passenger train that collided with the wagons and was derailed. Fourteen people were killed and 48 were injured.
- On 15 August 1895, locomotive No. 2159 Shark was one of two locomotives hauling an express passenger train that derailed at Preston, Lancashire due to excessive speed on a curve. One person was killed.

== List of locomotives ==
List of LNWR Waterloo class locomotives
LNWR No.	LNWR Name	Crewe Works No.	Date built	LMS No.	Date scrapped	Notes
748	Waterloo	3112	November 1889	5080	May 1924	
1045	Whitworth	3113	September 1889	5081	February 1926	(Note: LMS number not applied)
731	Croxteth	3114	November 1899	—	January 1923	
830	Trent	3115	January 1890	—	1907	
733	Chimera	3116	January 1890	5082	September 1926	
814	Henrietta	3117	January 1890	5083	July 1928	
738	Terrier	3118	1890	—	1908	
419	Zillah	3119	1890	—	1907	
635	Zamiel	3120	1890	—	1908	
758	Hardman	3121	January 1890	—	August 1922	
632	Ostrich	3122	June 1890	—	March 1911	
231	Firefly	3123	June 1890	—	August 1922	
828	Tubal	3124	July 1890	—	1906	
642	Bee	3125	August 1890	5084	January 1932	
901	Hero	3126	October 1890	5085	December 1928	
35	Talisman	3127	October 1890	—	November 1909	
36	Thalaba	3128	October 1890	—	July 1922	
444	Typhoon	3129	October 1890	—	1909	
468	Wildfire	3130	November 1890	5086		Transferred to Civil Engineer's Dept in 1923 as Engineer Northampton; withdrawn December 1927.
604	Narcissus	3131	November 1890	5087	September 1930	
736	Memnon	3132	January 1892	—	February 1915	
735	Charon	3133	January 1892	5088	December 1928	
757	Banshee	3134	January 1892	—	1908	
633	Samson	3135	January 1892	—	January 1913	
821	Diomed	3136	January 1892	—	1908	
81	Greystoke	3137	January 1892	—	1908	
829	Turk	3138	January 1892	—	1909	
934	North Star	3139	March 1892	5089	January 1928	
752	Glowworm	3140	March 1892	—	February 1913	
479	Mastodon	3141	March 1892	—	December 1913	
634	Ellesmere	3354	March 1893	5091	July 1928	
485	Euxine	3355	March 1893	—		To duplicate list as 3760 in 1921, to Civil Engineer's Dept as Engineer South Wales; withdrawn January 1932.
724	Eden	3356	March 1893	—	1908	
763	Violet	3357	March 1893	5092	April 1930	
764	Shap	3358	March 1893	5093	February 1926	
819	Puck	3359	March 1893	—	October 1911	
742	Spitfire	3360	March 1893	—		Transferred to Civil Engineer's Dept in 1921 as Engineer Liverpool; withdrawn October 1932.
285	Phalaris	3361	March 1893	—	1906	
418	Zygia	3362	March 1893	—	1908	
124	Marquis Douro	3363	March 1893	5090	September 1928	
628	Tartarus	3365	April 1893	5095	March 1932	
445	Ixion	3366	April 1893	—	January 1911	
817	Constance	3367	April 1893	5096	June 1927	
609	The Earl of Chester	3368	April 1893	5094	February 1928	Transferred to Civil Engineer's Dept in 1923 as Engineer Walsall
739	Sutherland	3369	April 1893	—	January 1923	Renamed Ostrich in 1913
636	Eclipse	3370	April 1893	—	1908	
935	Planet	3371	April 1893	—	1909	
902	Onyx	3372	April 1893	—	1907	
832	Sanspareil	3373	April 1893	—	1907	
446	Siren	3374	April 1893	—	June 1915	
434	St. Patrick	3375	April 1893	—	June 1912	
805	Caliban	3376	April 1893	—	1909	
824	Adelaide	3377	June 1893	5097	April 1929	
1162	Saddleback	3378	June 1893	—	May 1912	
2150	Atlas	3379	June 1893	—	1908	
2153	Isis	3380	June 1893	—	November 1914	
795	Falstaff	3381	June 1893	—	March 1914	
469	St. George	3382	June 1893	—	1907	
486	Skiddaw	3383	June 1893	5098	December 1926	
792	Theorem	3384	June 1893	5099		Transferred to Civil Engineer's Dept in 1923 as Engineer (spare engine); withdrawn July 1932.
737	Roberts	3441	May 1894	5100		Transferred to Civil Engineer's Dept in 1924 as Engineer Lancaster; withdrawn 1935
404	Zophyrus	3442	March 1894	—	April 1913	
2154	Loadstone	3443	March 1894	—	February 1913	
2159	Shark	3444	1894	—	1907	
793	Martin	3445	May 1894	5101		Transferred to Civil Engineer's Dept in 1923 as Engineer Watford; withdrawn April 1936
2152	Sybil	3446	1894	—	February 1914	
90	Luck of Edenhall	3447	1894	—	September 1915	
401	Zeno	3448	1894	—	June 1915	
1168	Cuckoo	3449	June 1894	5102	July 1931	
746	Castor	3450	June 1894	—	1908	
263	Pheasant	3451	1895	—	1907	
794	Woodlark	3452	January 1895	5104	January 1931	
2158	Sister Dora	3453	January 1895	5105	September 1927	Originally named Serpent
732	Hecla	3454	January 1895	5103	September 1927	
2155	Liver	3455	1895	—	November 1910	
2156	Sphinx	3456	February 1895	—		To duplicate list as 3488 in 1914, transferred to Civil Engineer's Dept in 1914 as Engineer Manchester; withdrawn October 1927.
852	Kestrel	3457	1895	—	1908	
1163	John O’Gaunt	3458	1895	—	January 1912	
1164	Odin	3459	1895	—	1909	
995	Medea	3460	1895	—	1908	
209	Petrel	3461	August 1895	—		To duplicate list as 3496 in 1914, transferred to Civil Engineer's Dept in 1914 as Engineer Crewe, to Engineer South Wales in 1932; withdrawn August 1933
487	John O’Groat	3462	August 1895	—	1919	
773	Centaur	3463	July 1895	5106	December 1924	
424	Sirius	3464	July 1895	5107	September 1927	
2151	Baltic	3465	December 1895	—	October 1910	
885	Vampire	3466	January 1896	—	March 1916	
1166	Wyre	3467	January 1896	5108	December 1927	
414	Prospero	3468	1896	—	December 1906	
2157	Unicorn	3469	November 1896	5109	July 1925	
631	Hotspur	3470	1896	—	December 1912	
