= Planet (locomotive) =

Early locomotive of the Liverpool and Manchester Railway

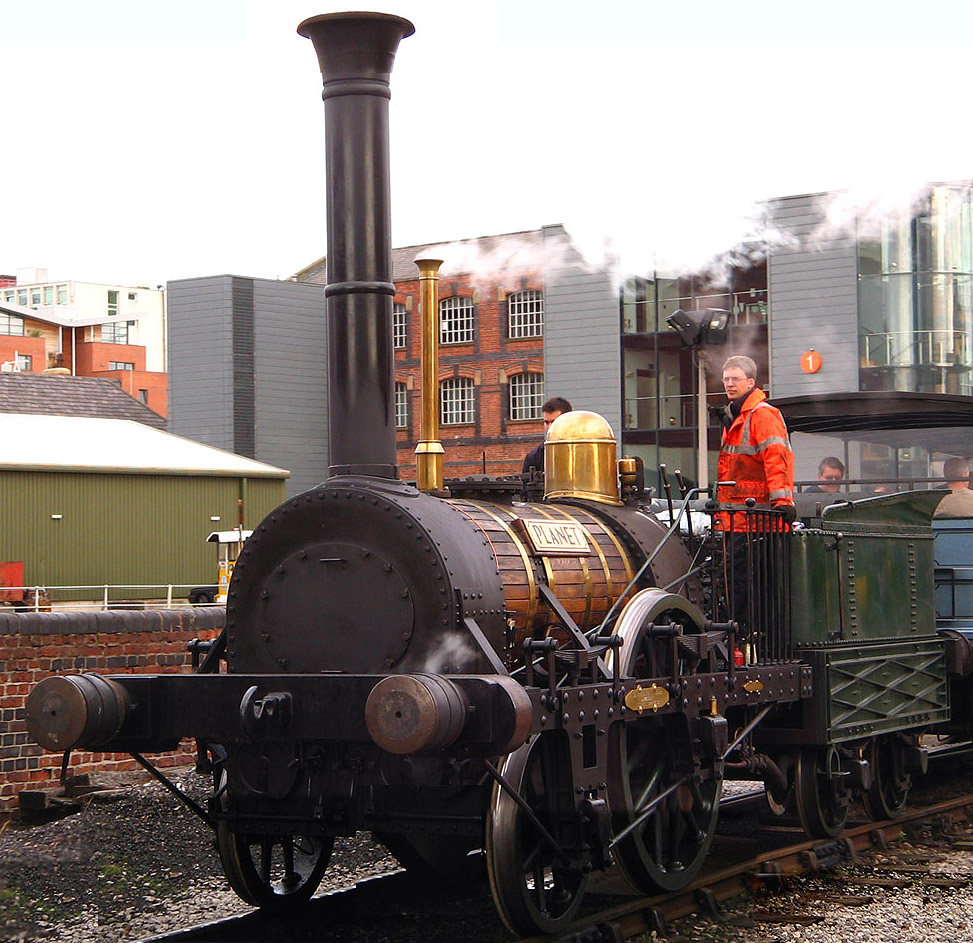
- Replica of Planet operating at the Science and Industry Museum
Type and origin
- Power type: Steam
- Builder: Robert Stephenson and Company and others
- Build date: September 1830
Specifications
- Configuration
  - Whyte: 2-2-0
- Gauge: 4 ft 8 1/2 in (1,435 mm) standard gauge
- Leading dia.: 3 ft 0 in (0.914 m)
- Driver dia.: 5 ft 0 in (1.524 m)
- Axle load: 2 long tons 3 cwt 0 qr (4,820 lb or 2.18 t)
- Loco weight: 4 long tons 5 cwt 0 qr (9,520 lb or 4.32 t)
- Boiler
  - Diameter: 3 ft 0 in (0.91 m)
  - Tube plates: 6 ft 6 in (1.98 m)
- Cylinders: Two
- Cylinder size: 11 in × 16 in (279 mm × 406 mm)
- Couplers: buffers and chain
Career
- Operators: Liverpool and Manchester Railway
- Numbers: 9
- Withdrawn: 1840–41

Planet was an early steam locomotive built in 1830 by Robert Stephenson and Company for the Liverpool and Manchester Railway.

== History ==
The ninth locomotive built for the L&MR, it was Stephenson's next major design change after the Rocket. It was the first locomotive to employ inside cylinders, and subsequently the 2-2-0 type became known as Planets. On 23 November 1830 No.9 Planet ran the approximately 50 km (30 mi) from Liverpool to Manchester in one hour.

It only lasted in service about ten years; having been rebuilt in 1833, it was withdrawn circa 1840–1841.

== Planet-type locomotives ==
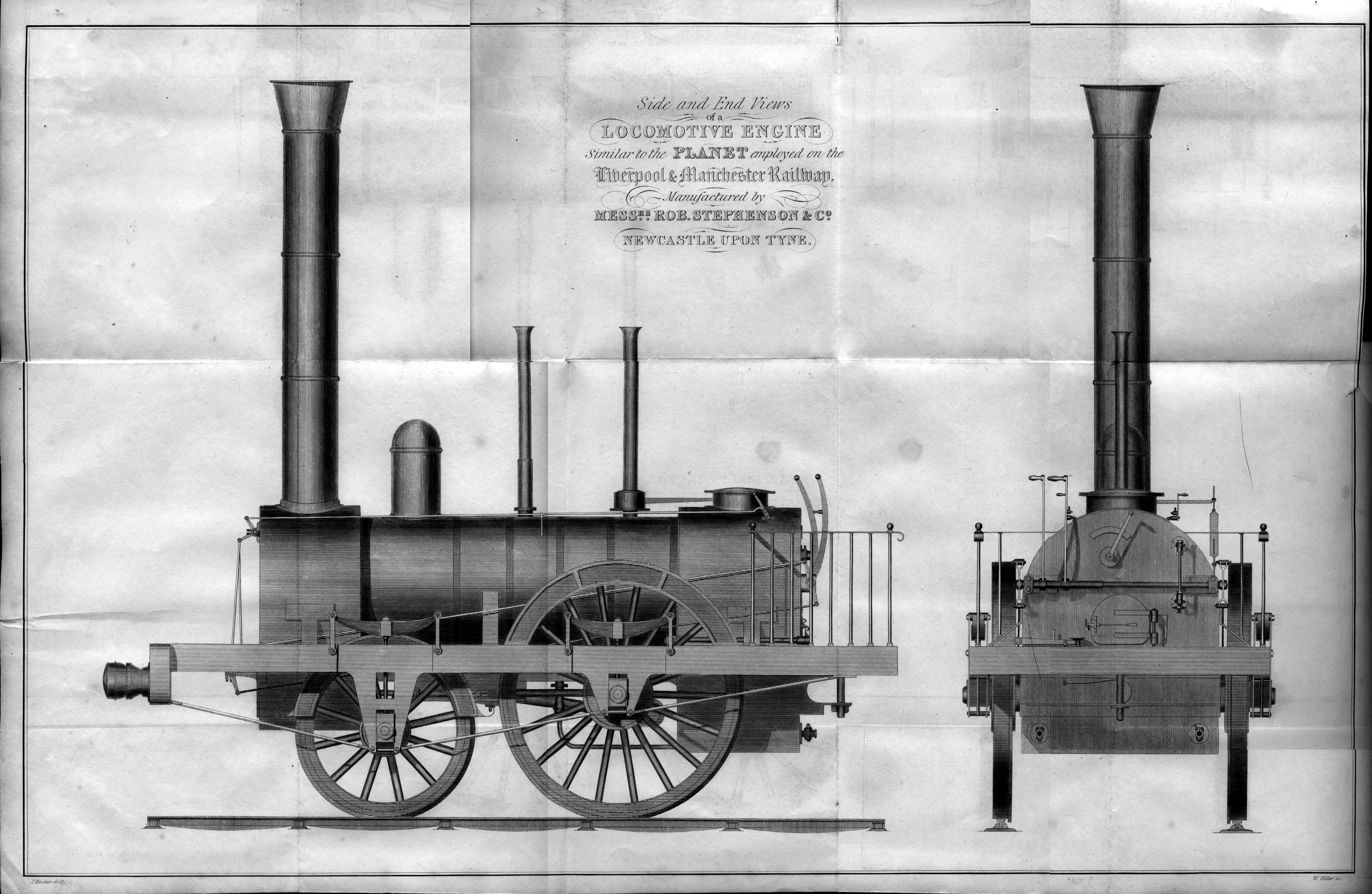
A contemporary engraving of a locomotive "similar to the Planet", though with some differences in detail

Six further of the type were ordered by the L&MR from Robert Stephenson & Co. Three more were supplied by Murray & Wood in Leeds, to whom Robert Stephenson & Co. had sent the drawings for their manufacture.

The Planet (from 1830) and the Patentee (from 1834, also designed by Stephenson) were the first locomotive types to be built in large numbers.

== Improvements ==
The Planet locomotives appear closer to subsequent types, and conversely look quite different from Rocket although only a year separated these two designs (Stephenson's Northumbrian representing an intermediate evolutionary step).

Other improvements include:

- a steam dome to prevent water reaching the cylinders.
- buffers and couplings in a position setting a new standard.

== Replica ==
A working replica was built in 1992 by the Friends of the Museum of Science and Industry (MOSI) in Manchester, and is operated by volunteers to provide rides for visitors. When not in steam the locomotive is on display in the museum's Power Hall. Planet has visited several other Heritage railways including Shildon Locomotion Museum.

The replica was used as an on-screen stand-in for the original locomotive in an episode of the ITV/PBS television series Victoria.

== Later engines named Planet ==
Planet having been retired before the London and North Western Railway acquired the Liverpool and Manchester Railway, the name was absent from the LNWR list until 1866 when Samson class 2-4-0 no. 935 was named Planet. The name (and number) were passed to that locomotive's replacement in 1893, a Waterloo class 2-4-0. That locomotive lasted until 1909, but then remained unused for four years until a George the Fifth class 4-4-0 no. 2197 received the name. This locomotive was withdrawn in 1935.

LMS Royal Scot Class 4-6-0 locomotive 6131 was originally named Planet when built in 1928, but in 1936 was renamed The Royal Warwickshire Regiment. In 1948, the name was applied to LMS Rebuilt Patriot Class No. 45545. British Railways Class 86 86218 carried the name Planet from 1979 to 1993.

== See also ==
- List of Liverpool and Manchester Railway locomotives
