= John Ramsbottom (engineer) =

English engineer

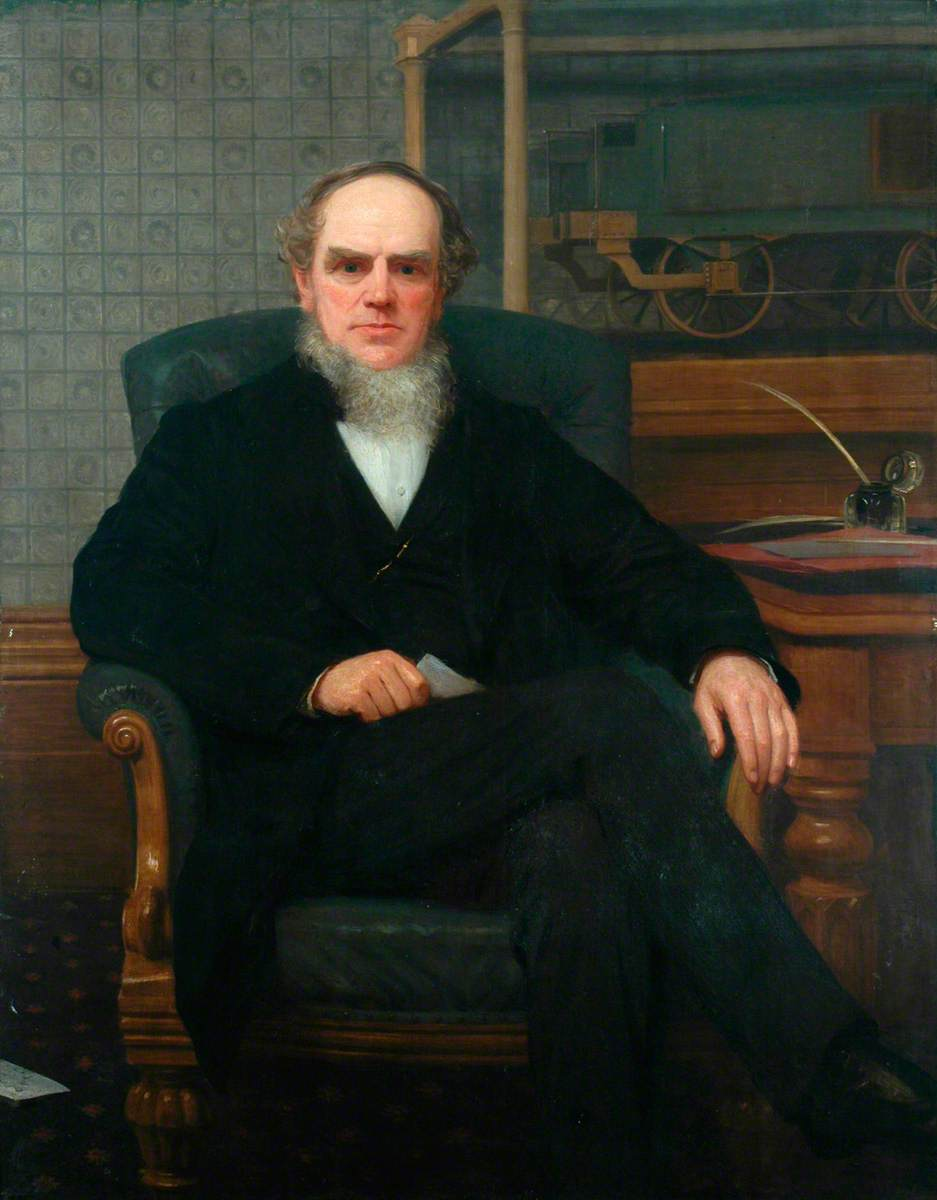
- 1879 by William Percy (1820–1893), with a model of his water scoop
- Born: 11 September 1814; Todmorden, Yorkshire, England
- Died: 20 May 1897 (aged 82); Alderley Edge, Cheshire, England
- Engineering career
- Discipline: Mechanical engineering

John Ramsbottom (11 September 1814 – 20 May 1897) was an English mechanical engineer. He was born in Todmorden, then on the county border of Yorkshire and Lancashire. He was the chief mechanical engineer for the London and North Western Railway for 14 years. He created many inventions for railways, most notably the split metal piston ring now used by nearly all reciprocating engines.

== Early life ==
John Ramsbottom was born on 11 September 1814 in Todmorden. He was the third child of six and the youngest son. His parents were Henry and Sarah Ramsbottom, Henry was a cotton spinner. His grandfather was John Ramsbottom, a tailor.

He had little in the way of schooling having "a short time spent in a dame's school he went to four schoolmasters in succession, then to a baptist minister, then to a colleague of the latter, who taught him as far as simple equations".

== Todmorden ==
His grandfather and father leased land in the Salford area of Todmorden, and in 1804–1805 established the "Steam Factory", the first steam powered cotton spinning mill in Todmorden. (Note: The Salford area of Todmorden was The Cradle of Todmorden Industry according to Pennie (2007). The area was ideally placed being adjacent to the Rochdale canal which had opened in 1804.)

His father gave him a lathe which he used to construct models of various steam engines for his own education and to entertain friends. He used these skills in the workplace rebuilding and modifying the mill engine. He was interested in other technologies, installing the 'new' coal gas illumination in the mill and manufacturing a machine to produce cut nails. In partnership with his uncle, Richard Holt, he took out a patent (No. 6644) in 1834 for an improvement to a power loom, described in Pennie (2007) as a "vertical loom and weft-fork". In 1836 he took out another patent (No. 6975) for "roving, spinning and doubling of fibres".

== Manchester ==
In 1839 he went as a journeyman to Sharp, Roberts & Co. in Manchester. The company manufactured textile machinery and machine tools at their Atlas Works in Manchester. By the time Ramsbottom joined them they were also a successful manufacturer of steam locomotives and here he "gained practical knowledge of the design and construction of steam locomotives".

Three years later, in May 1842, on the recommendation of Charles Beyer (later to become co-founder of Beyer, Peacock and Company in 1854) Ramsbottom was appointed locomotive superintendent of the newly opened Manchester and Birmingham Railway (M&BR) at their new works at Longsight, Manchester. In November 1843 he was promoted to take charge of the newly formed locomotive and rolling stock department when the M&BR separated their civil and mechanical engineering departments, at a salary of £170.

In 1846 the M&BR merged and became part of the London and North Western Railway (L&NWR), and Ramsbottom became District Superintendent North Eastern Division, remaining at Longsight at an increased salary of £300.

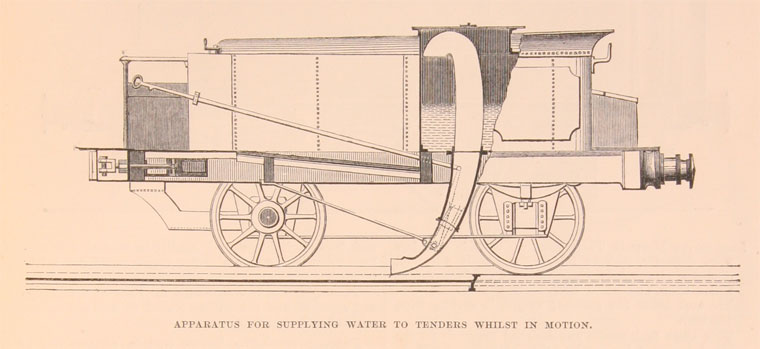
Water scoop

== Crewe ==
In 1857 the North and North Eastern divisions of the L&NWR were amalgamated into the Northern Division (lines north of Rugby), Ramsbottom became Northern locomotive superintendent, based at Crewe Works.

In 1862 the L&NWR Northern and Southern divisions were amalgamated with Ramsbottom becoming Chief Mechanical Engineer (CME) for the whole system. Shortly after a Bessemer Steel Works was authorised for installation at Crewe so that the L&NWR could produce its own steel for locomotive construction and rails.

During his time as CME he oversaw the enlargement and modernisation of Crewe works, he was responsible for the bulk production of cheap but capable locomotives, introduced ancillary works including the steel plant and a brickworks, and installed an internal narrow-gauge railway to facilitate the movement of material.

== Post L&NWR ==
Ramsbottom retired in 1871 ostensibly because of ill health but likely because his request for a salary increase was turned down by the L&NWR Board of Directors. The L&NWR continued to pay Ramsbottom an annual stipend of £1,000 for several years after he left, valuing his expertise as a consultant if not as an employee.

However, in 1883 Ramsbottom became a consulting engineer and a director of the Lancashire and Yorkshire Railway (L&YR), where his major legacy was the establishment of Horwich Works on a greenfield site near Bolton.

== Locomotive designs ==
During his time at Crewe he was responsible for the design and production of the following locomotives;

- L&NWR 2-2-2 Cornwall, rebuilt to his design in 1858
- L&NWR DX Goods Class 0-6-0
- L&NWR Lady of the Lake Class 2-2-2
- L&NWR 4ft Shunter 0-4-0ST
- L&NWR Samson Class 2-4-0
- L&NWR Newton Class 2-4-0
- L&NWR Special Tank 0-6-0ST

He laid the foundation for the L&NWR engine design by adopting inside frames, his safety valves, screw reversing gear and left-hand drive.

== Innovations ==
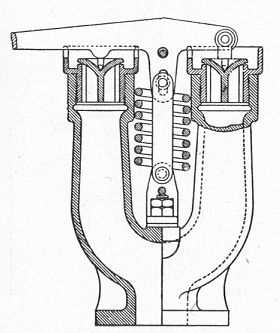
Sectioned view of a Ramsbottom safety valve

Ramsbottom applied for 24 patents between 1834 and 1880 of which 23 were approved, they are listed below: (Note: Pennie (2007) notes that this list is shorter than others and explains this by commenting that there were three engineers with the name "John Ramsbottom" during this period and it is only possible to work out which of them is responsible for each application by detailed examination of the applications.)

- 1834 -In partnership with his uncle, Richard Holt, he took out patent No. 6644 for an improvement to a power loom, described in Pennie (2007) as a "Vertical loom and weft-fork".
- 1836 - he took out patent No. 6975 for "Roving, spinning and doubling of fibres".
- 1848 - In partnership with William Baker patent No. 12384 "Railway wheels, and turntables with thrust races."
- 1852 - he invented the split piston ring, which provided a tight seal of the piston against the cylinder with low friction described in patent No. 767 as "Metallic piston and piston rings, and hydraulic throttle vale.
- 1854 - Patent No. 309 for a "Hydraulic hoist for rolling stock."
- 1854 - Patent No. 408 for "Improvements in welding."
- 1855 - Patent No. 322 for "Piston ring improvements."
- 1855 - The Ramsbottom tamper-proof safety valve was introduced, patent No. 1299 was for "Safety valves, and feed water cistern.". (Note: Illustrations of Ramsbottom design are available in Henley's Encyclopedia of Practical Engineering (1908) and Tuplin (1974).)
- 1857 - Patent No. 1047 for "Wrought iron rail chair."
- 1860 - He patented a design for a water trough and water pick-up apparatus (patent No. 1527 "Water trough and scoop"), introducing the first one on 23 June 1860 at Mochdre, Conwy, on the London & North Western Railway's (L&NWR) North Wales Coast Line, midway between Chester and Holyhead. Finding that the system was at its most efficient at 40 miles per hour (64 km/h) he invented a speed indicator!
- 1860 - He introduced the "Displacement lubricator", patent No. 2460.
- 1863 - Patent No. 924 saw improvements in the design of steam hammers with the invention of a "Duplex steam hammer & cogging mill" which negated the requirement to provide an anvil ten times the weight of the hammer.
- 1864 - Ramsbottom patented, No. 48, a system for the "Manufacture of hoops and tyres".
- 1864 - Patent No. 3073 saw "Bessemer Converter improvements".
- 1865 - Patent No. 89 brought "Steam hammer improvements", No. 375 introduced "Hammering and rolling machinery", No. 736 saw improvements to 1863, No. 924, No. 1425 brought improvements to 1864, No. 48 and No. 1975 saw "Improvement processes for hoops and tyres".
- 1867 - Patent N. 342 for "Supporting ingots for steam hammer" and No. 386 "Traverser for rolling stock".
- 1869 - Patent No. 820 was for "Ventilating tunnels", which introduced a mechanical ventilation system that was used in the tunnel between Liverpool Lime Street and Edge Hill, Ramsbottom presented a paper to the Institution of Mechanical Engineers on this subject.
- 1880 - Patent No. 1060 for "Trip gear for steam and gas engines".

The patent application that did not get past the provisional stage of the process was applied for in 1868 for "Communication cord".

== Publications ==
Ramsbottom presented twelve papers to the Institution of Mechanical Engineers which were published in the Institution's Journal as follows: (Note: There are some discrepancies between the dates used in Pennie (2007) and the journal dates.)

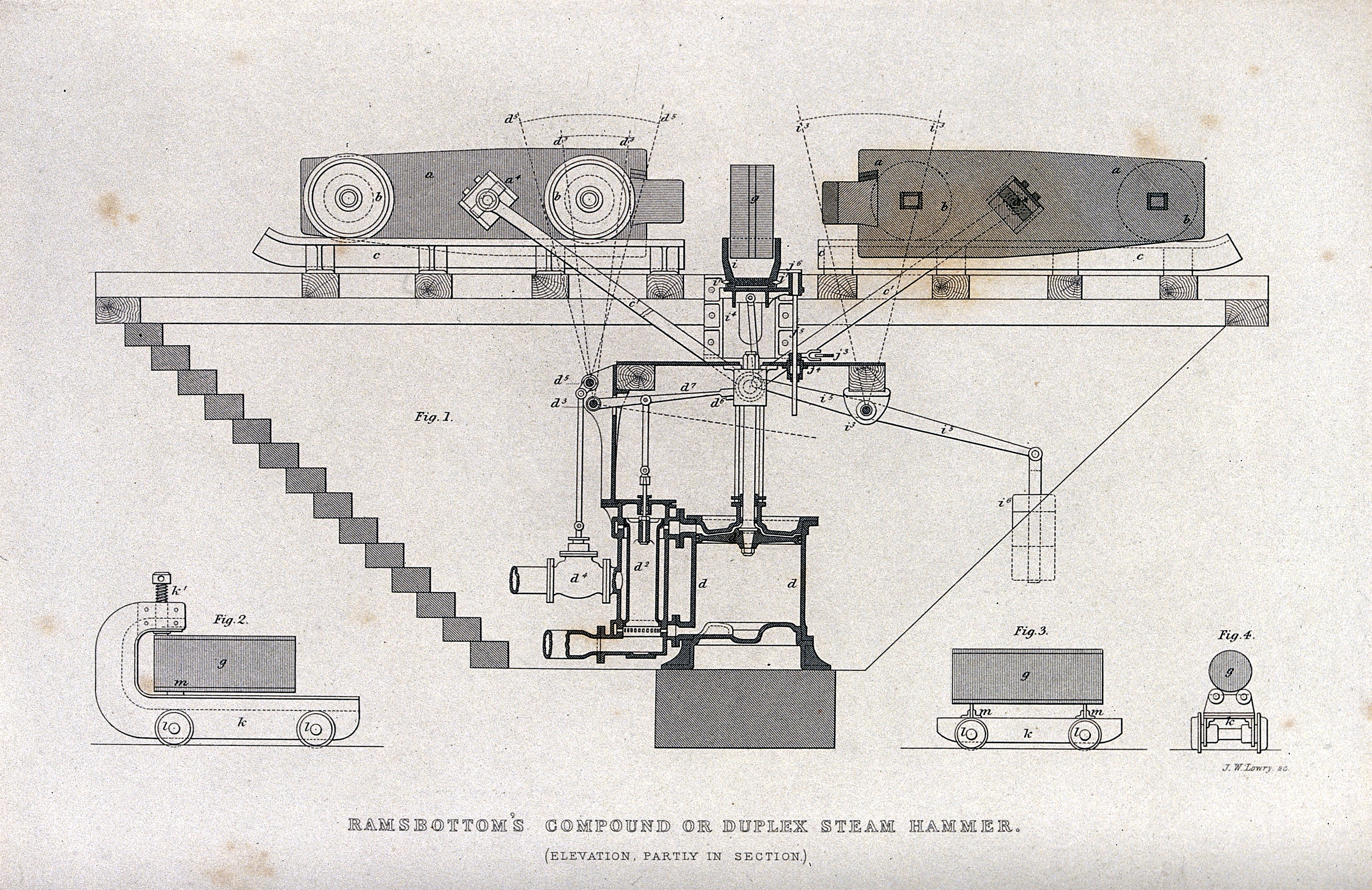
Machinery; a double-action steam hammer. Engraving by J. W. Wellcome V0024560

- 1847 - On an improved locomotive boiler.
- 1853 - Description of an improved coking crane for supplying locomotives.
- 1854 - On an improved piston for steam engines.
- 1855 - On the construction of packing rings for pistons.
- 1856 - On an improved safety valve.
- 1857 - Description of a safety escape pipe for steam boilers.
- 1861 - Description of a method of supplying water to locomotive tenders whilst running.
- 1864 - On the improved traversing cranes at Crewe Locomotive Works.
- 1866 - Description of an improved reversing rolling mill.
- 1866 - On an improved mode of manufacture of steel tyres.
- 1867 - Description of a 30-ton horizontal steam hammer.
- 1871 - On the mechanical ventilation of the Liverpool Passenger Tunnel on the London and North Western Railway.

== Appointments ==
He was president of the Crewe Mechanics Institute from 1857 to 1871. He was a founder member of the Institution of Mechanical Engineers in 1847 and became its president in 1870–71. Ramsbottom became a member of the Institution of Civil Engineers in 1866.

Ramsbottom was appointed a life governor of Owens College in Manchester (now the University of Manchester) where he assisted in expanding the mechanical engineering department. His interest in the college was such that he established a scholarship, tenable for two years to be competed for by young men employed in the locomotive department of the L&NWR. He was a director of Beyer-Peacock from 1885 where his two sons John and George held positions. He took up a directorship in the L&YR in 1885 after working as a consultant for them on their new locomotive works. In 1890 he received an honorary degree of Master of Engineering from Dublin University.

== Family ==
He married Mary Peckett, the eldest daughter of William Peckett, a Quaker linen manufacturer of Barnsley on 29 April 1851. They lived near Longsight depot where Ramsbottom was based at the time; their son William Henry was born here on 28 February 1852.

Shortly after he moved to Crewe in 1857 his wife, who was still at Longsight, died of "venous congestion of the lungs".

He married again on 12 April 1859 to Mary Anne Goodfellow and they had a son, John Goodfellow, in 1860, daughters Margaret Holt in 1861, Jane in 1863, Mary Edith in 1865, a son George Holt in 1868, daughters Eliza in 1874 and Hannah Mary in 1878. Margaret and Eliza died as children.

Business positions
Preceded by Francis Trevithick	Chief Mechanical Engineer of the London and North Western Railway; 1857–1871	Succeeded by F. W. Webb
Professional and academic associations
Preceded by William George Armstrong	President of the Institution of Mechanical Engineers; 1870–1871	Succeeded by Carl Wilhelm Siemens
