= Babcock & Wilcox =

American power technology company

Babcock & Wilcox Enterprises, Inc.
- Formerly: The Babcock & Wilcox Company
- Type: Public
- Traded as: NYSE: BW; Russell 2000 component
- Industry: Power; Industrial
- Founded: 1867; 159 years ago in Providence, Rhode Island, U.S.
- Founders: Stephen Wilcox; George Herman Babcock
- Headquarters: Akron, Ohio, U.S.
- Area served: Worldwide
- Key people: Kenny Young (Chairman and CEO)
- Revenue: ▲US$999 million (2023)
- Number of employees: 2,250 (2023)
- Website: babcock.com

Babcock & Wilcox Enterprises, Inc. is an American energy technology and service provider that is active and has operations in many international markets with its headquarters in Akron, Ohio. Historically, the company is best known for their steam boilers.

== Background ==
The company was founded in 1867 in Providence, Rhode Island, by partners Stephen Wilcox and George Babcock to manufacture and market Wilcox's patented water-tube boiler. B&W's list of innovations and firsts include the world's first installed utility boiler (1881); manufacture of boilers to power New York City's first subway (1902); first pulverized coal power plant (1918); design and manufacture of components for USS Nautilus, the world's first nuclear-powered submarine (1953–55); the first supercritical pressure coal-fired boiler (1957); design and supply of reactors for the first U.S. built nuclear-powered surface ship, NS Savannah (1961).

== History ==
The old B&W company logo, showing the world as an Aeolipile

In 1867, Stephen Wilcox, Jr. and his partner George Herman Babcock, of Providence, Rhode Island, patented their so-called safety boiler ("Improvements in Steam Generators", U.S. Patent No. 65,042). Its water was dispersed in many small tubes that resisted exploding when heated, a significant advance over conventional shell boilers, whose water was concentrated in a single container. When overheated, seams of the shell could burst, causing an explosion, often with fatal consequences. The water tube boiler had the added advantages that it could generate steam under higher pressure and more efficiently than existing designs.

In 1878, Thomas Edison purchased B&W boiler No. 92 for his Menlo Park laboratory.

In 1891, Babcock & Wilcox Ltd was established as a separate United Kingdom company, to be responsible for all sales outside the US and Cuba. In 1895, B&W supplied of steam furnaces of Kahrizak sugar factory, Tehran, Iran. In 1898, Robert Jurenka and Alois Seidl signed an agreement with the British division, Babcock & Wilcox Ltd, to make the Berlin, Germany Babcock sales office into a subsidiary of the British company; a factory in Oberhausen in the Ruhr district made the boiler designed by the American engineers.

In 1902, New York City's first subway line was powered by B&W boilers. During 1907 and 1909, Theodore Roosevelt's Great White Fleet were powered by B&W Boilers.

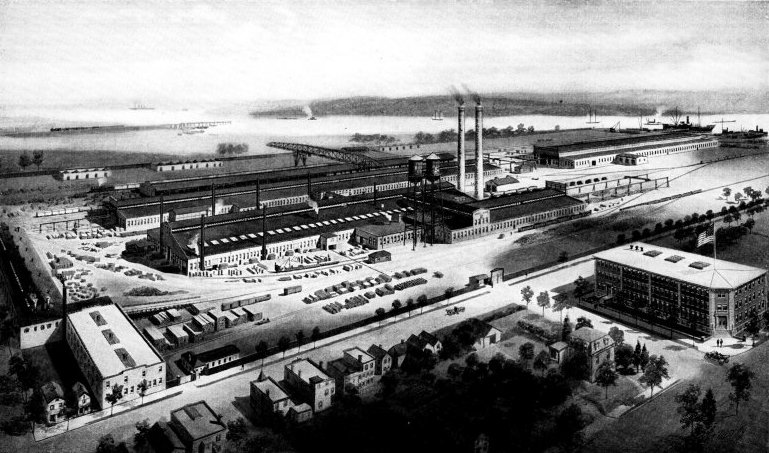
Babcock & Wilcox Co. works, Bayonne, New Jersey, c. 1919

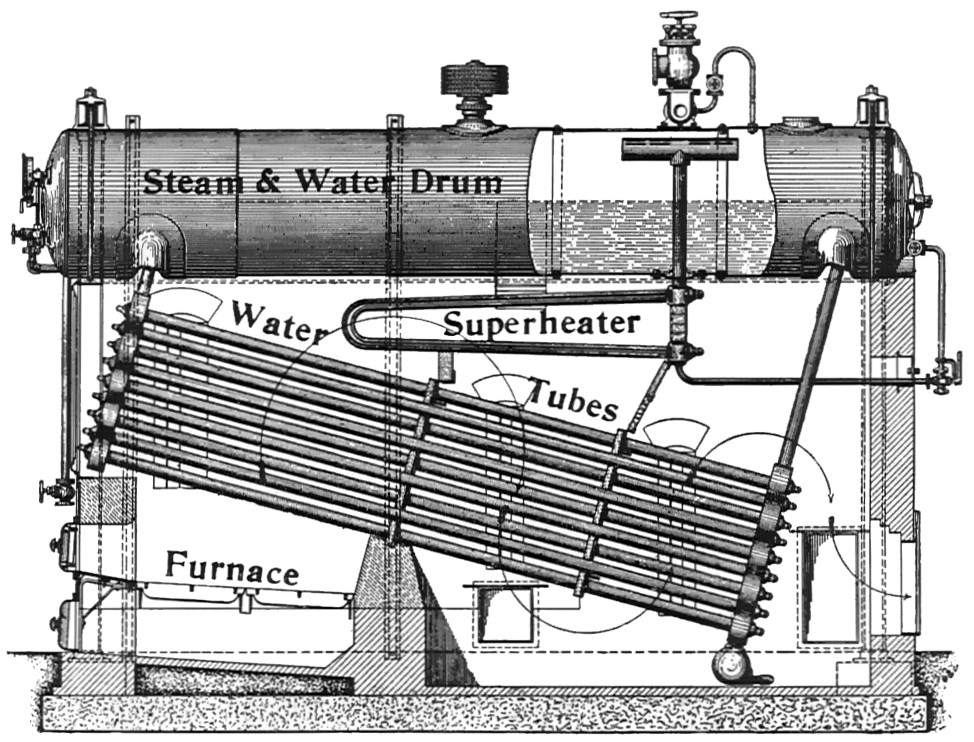
1913 Babcock & Wilcox boiler section

In 1915, The Babcock & Wilcox Company acquired the Dumbarton Weldless Tube Company Ltd., originally Kosmoid Tubes Ltd., with works in Dumbarton, Scotland (operational until 1997). In 1923, both Babcock & Wilcox Ltd and The Babcock & Wilcox Company bought into The Goldie & McCulloch Company Ltd of Cambridge, Ontario, to form Babcock-Wilcox & Goldie-McCulloch Ltd in Canada. In 1929, B&W installed the world's first commercial size recovery boiler using the magnesium bisulfite process in Quebec, Canada.

Between 1941 and 1945, B&W designed and delivered 4,100 marine boilers for combat and merchant ships, including 95 percent of the US fleet in Tokyo Bay at Japanese surrender. In 1942, the company developed the cyclone furnace. Between 1943 and 1945, B&W provided components, materials and process development for Manhattan Project.

In 1948, Babcock and Wilcox was at the center of a labor dispute with the United Stone and Allied Products Workers of America. The National Labor Relations Board held that during captive audience meetings, the union was entitled to equal time. This was later overturned in Livingston Shirt Corp.

Between 1949 and 1952, B&W provided the 8 boilers for the SS United States, the fastest ocean liner ever constructed. Between 1953 and 1955, B&W designed and fabricated components for USS Nautilus (SSN-571), world's first nuclear-powered submarine. In 1961, B&W designed and supplied reactors for world's first commercial nuclear ship NS Savannah. In 1962, B&W designed and furnished reactor systems for B&W's first commercial reactor, Indian Point, NY, using HEU 233.

In 1967, the name of Babcock-Wilcox & Goldie-McCulloch Ltd is changed to Babcock & Wilcox Canada Ltd.

In 1975, B&W designed and built components for liquid metal fast breeder reactors.

In 1975, the long-term business agreements with the British Babcock & Wilcox Ltd were ended. Subsequently, the British company was renamed Babcock International Group plc.

In 1978, B&W designed and built the nuclear reactor that was involved in the Three Mile Island accident. In 1983, A known, unreported design failure in a B&W valve was found to be an initial cause for the Three Mile Island accident. In 1999, B&W was awarded the contract to develop fuel cells and steam reforming for US Navy.

On February 22, 2000, B&W filed for Chapter 11 bankruptcy in part as a result of thousands of claims for personal injury due to prolonged exposure to asbestos and asbestos fibers. Claims included asbestosis, lung cancer, pleural and peritoneal mesothelioma. As a condition of emerging from bankruptcy, B&W created a trust fund to compensate victims for amounts far less than settlements paid in individual personal injury lawsuits.

After B&W emerged from bankruptcy in 2006, B&W and BWX Technologies, both subsidiaries of the McDermott International, Inc., merged on 26 November 2007 to form The Babcock & Wilcox Companies, headed by President John Fees. The old company logo was changed.

On June 10, 2009, B&W unveiled B&W Modular Nuclear Energy, LLC (B&W MNE). On the same day, B&W MNE announced its plans to design and develop the B&W mPower reactor, a modular, scalable nuclear reactor. The B&W mPower reactor design is a 125 megawatt, passively safe Advanced Light Water Reactor (ALWR) (a Generation III reactor) with a below-ground containment structure. The reactor is set to be manufactured in a factory, shipped by rail, then buried underground.

On May 12, 2010, B&W announced that it and its subsidiaries would be spun off from its parent company, McDermott International, Inc. The headquarters moved from Lynchburg, Virginia to Charlotte. and the company became The Babcock & Wilcox Company.

On August 2, 2010, B&W began trading on the New York Stock Exchange as BWC.

On June 30, 2015, Babcock & Wilcox completed a spinoff from BWX Technologies, its former parent company. The two companies began trading separately on July 1 when Babcock & Wilcox Enterprises, Inc. was listed on the New York Stock Exchange under the ticker symbol: BW. In 2016, in the UK, the company was ordered to change its name following a petition filed by Babcock International.

On September 24, 2018, Babcock & Wilcox announced that it would move its corporate headquarters from Charlotte to Akron, Ohio, into space formerly occupied by the Goodyear Tire and Rubber Company prior to its move to a new building nearby. On December 30, 2019, Babcock & Wilcox relocated its corporate headquarters from Barberton, Ohio, to Akron, Ohio.

== See also ==
- Steam generator (boiler)
