= LNWR 2-2-2 3020 Cornwall =

Preserved British steam locomotive

LNWR Cornwall
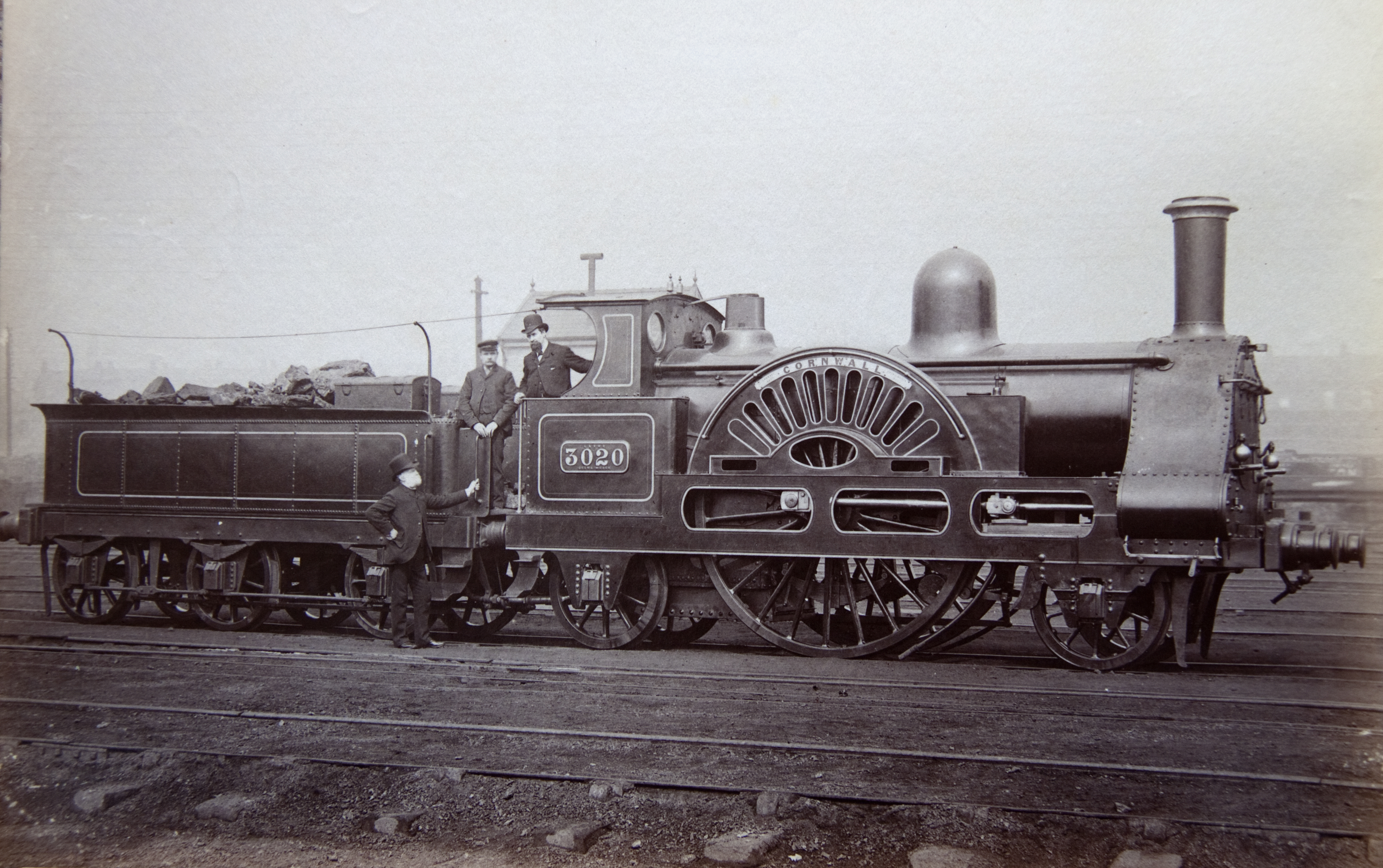
- Numbered 3020 in 1886, Cornwall rebuilt as a 2-2-2
Type and origin
- Power type: Steam
- Designer: Francis Trevithick, rebuilt by Ramsbottom
- Builder: LNWR Crewe
- Build date: 1847
- Total produced: 1
- Rebuild date: 1858
Specifications
- Configuration
  - Whyte: 4-2-2 rebuilt as 2-2-2
- Gauge: 4 ft 8 1/2 in (1,435 mm)
- Leading dia.: 3 ft 6 in (1.067 m)
- Driver dia.: 8 ft 6 in (2.591 m)
- Fuel type: Coal
- Water cap.: 1,800 imp gal (8,200 L; 2,200 US gal)
- Cylinders: Two, outside
- Cylinder size: 17.5 in × 24 in (444 mm × 610 mm), later 17.25 in × 24 in (438 mm × 610 mm)
Performance figures
- Tractive effort: 8,575 lbf (38.1 kN)
Career
- Operators: London and North Western Railway
- Locale: Great Britain
- First run: 1847
- Withdrawn: 1925
- Disposition: Preserved

London and North Western Railway (LNWR) 2-2-2 No. 3020 Cornwall is a preserved steam locomotive. It was originally built as a 4-2-2 at Crewe Works in 1847, but was extensively rebuilt and converted into its current form in 1858.

== Early high-speed locomotive design ==
In the 1840s, express passenger locomotive design was focused on the need for single large-diameter driving wheels of around 8 ft (2.4 m). The wheel diameter is effectively the "gear ratio" of a steam engine, and large driving wheels delivered the high linear tyre speed needed for fast locomotives, whilst keeping the axle bearing and piston speeds low enough to remain within the limits of the existing technology. Later on, increasing engine power would require better adhesion than a single pair of driving wheels could provide, but that was not a problem at the time.

As well as needing large wheels for speed, stability required a low centre of gravity, and thus a low-slung boiler. The difficulty was that the two conditions were in conflict, because the boiler of the locomotive would take up the space also needed for the driving axle.

One solution to the problem was the Crampton design, in which the driving axle was moved behind the boiler's firebox. These engines were relatively long in comparison to their contemporaries, and had long rigid frames, sometimes with as many as three carrying axles ahead of the driving axle, creating a 6-2-0 wheel arrangement. Cramptons were most popular in France and Germany, but some were also used in England, by companies including the London and North Western Railway (LNWR).

One of these LNWR Cramptons, Liverpool, was particularly long, having a rigid wheelbase of 18 ft 6 in (5.64 m). Although the locomotive was fast and capable of working heavy trains for long distances, its oversized frame caused damage to the track.

== 1847 design by Trevithick ==
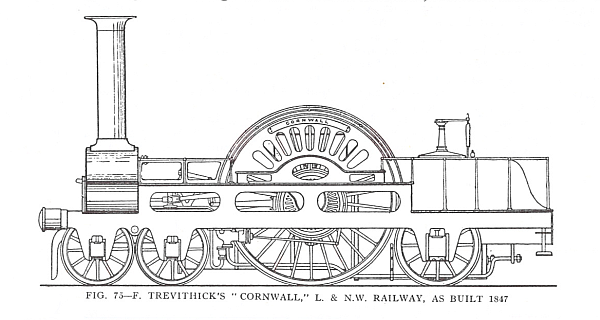
Cornwall as built in 1847

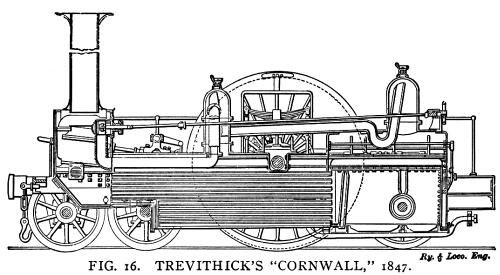
As in 1847, sectioned

Francis Trevithick had a notable pedigree as a locomotive engineer, being the son of Cornish engineer Richard Trevithick. Francis had moved north to become resident engineer, then Locomotive Superintendent of the Grand Junction Railway (GJR) (later formed into the LNWR). Cornwall was named after the county of his birth.

Cornwall was an attempt to avoid the damaging long wheelbase of the Cramptons, whilst still permitting large driving wheels. By moving the driving axle ahead of the firebox, one of the carrying axles could be moved backwards, giving a shorter overall wheelbase. The difficulty of how to fit the axles past the boiler recurred, to which Trevithick provided an "extremely complicated" solution. The boiler was placed entirely underneath the driving axle. Even then, it was necessary to recess a transverse channel across the top of the boiler, so as to provide clearance for the driving axle. The trailing carrying axle passed through a crosswise tube through the middle of the firebox. This made assembly difficult, but as it was only a straight carrying axle rather than a cranked driving axle, the tube diameter required was manageable. This use of a cross-firebox axle tube was part of Crampton's patent of 1842.

As completed in 1847, and first numbered 173, Cornwall was a 4-2-2 with 8 feet 6 inches (2.59 m) drivers, paired leading wheels of 3 feet 6 inches (1.07 m), single trailing wheels of 4 feet (1.2 m) and an overall wheelbase of 16 feet 6 inches (5.03 m). It was exhibited at the Great Exhibition of 1851 in this condition.

The Railway Gazette, cited in Ahrons, suggests that there was an even earlier design for Cornwall, as a 2-2-2 with single 4 ft wheels both forward and back. It's uncertain if Cornwall was ever built in this form. The drawing does show a considerable front overhang, with a high load placed on the front axle. If constructed like this, the likelihood is that it would suffer the same problems as its contemporary, Gooch's first 2-2-2 Great Western class of 1846, where a broken front axle led to re-design as a 4-2-2.

A typical Crampton feature, previously used on Liverpool, was the large diameter of the outside eccentrics used to drive the valve gear. These were so large as to be larger than the driving cranks, thus avoiding the need for an overhung (and potentially weak) crank. The 17.5 by 24 inches (440 mm × 610 mm) cylinders were horizontal, fed by inclined steam chests above them.

== 1858 rebuilding by Ramsbottom ==
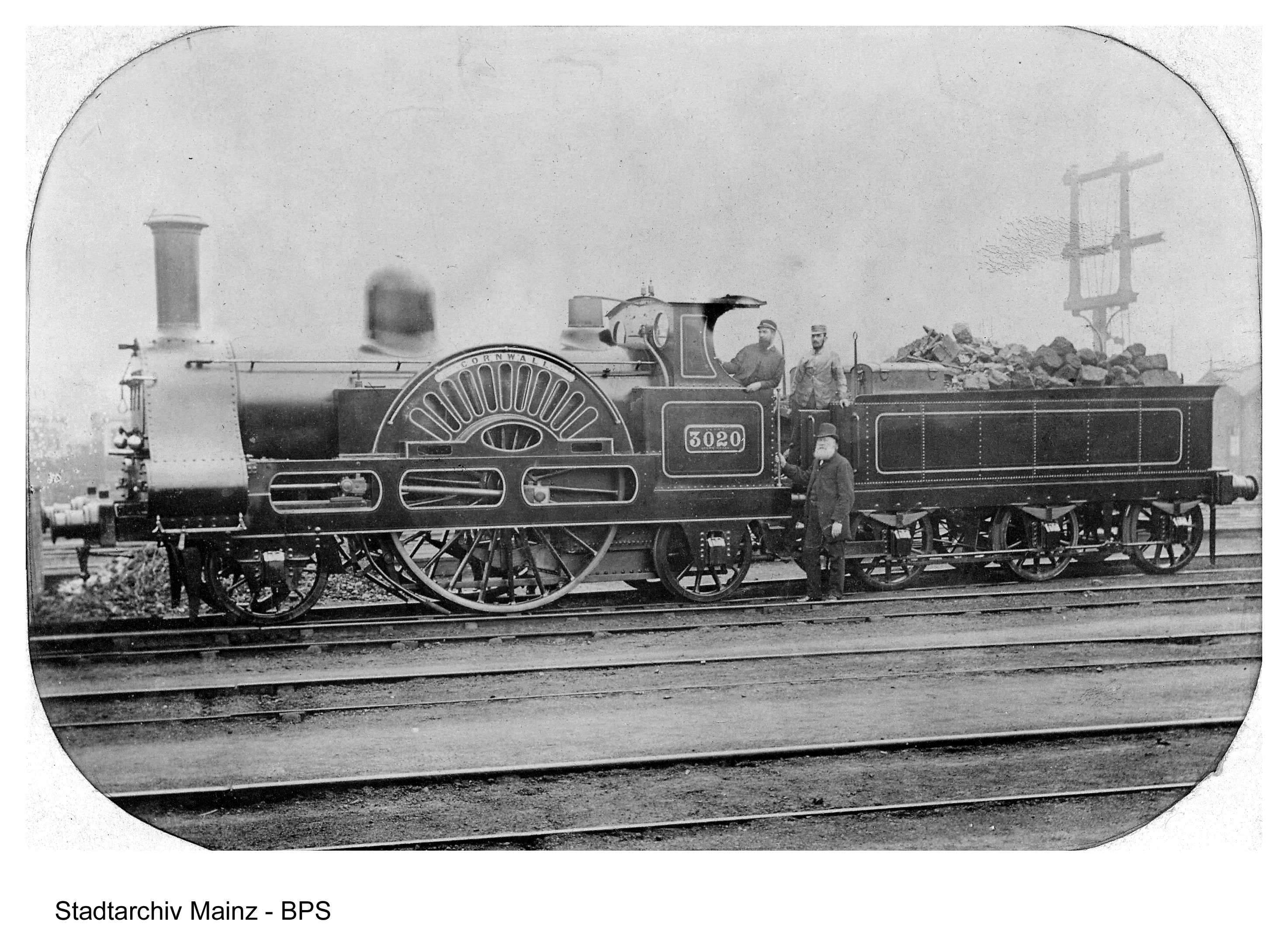
Cornwall as rebuilt in 1858

In 1858, Ramsbottom redesigned Cornwall almost completely. Little survived unchanged, other than the outside frames and the centres of the drivers. The boiler was now moved entirely above the driving axle, without any notches, channels or tubes, to what would now be regarded as conventional practice.

New cylinders and valve gear were provided, fractionally smaller at 17.5 by 24 inches (440 mm × 610 mm). The wheel arrangement was now 2-2-2, shortening the wheelbase still further to 14 feet 10 inches (4.52 m). Ramsbottom also included his newly designed tamper-proof safety valves.

Another minor rebuild in the 1870s provided a typically LNWR style of cab, with a short roof and semi-open sides. It was renumbered 3020 in June 1886.

== In service ==
Cornwall was a famously successful high-speed passenger express engine of its period. Charles Rous-Marten reported an 1884 run from Crewe to Chester behind Cornwall (now far from new, and of antiquated design) at an average speed of 50.7 miles per hour (81.6 km/h), reaching 70 miles per hour (110 km/h) down Whitmore bank. It remained in express service on the Liverpool-Manchester route until withdrawn in 1902, after which it became an inspection locomotive. In 1921, the locomotive was recorded as returning to Crewe from London as the pilot engine to a regular express. In 1925, Ahrons reports that it was still in service hauling the Mechanical Engineer's inspection coach.

On final retirement, Cornwall was deliberately preserved, one of the first locomotives to be so treated.

== Visit to Japan ==
In the mid 1980s, Cornwall was repainted by the National Railway Museum and air freighted to Japan for exhibition and later returned to Crewe.

== Preservation today ==
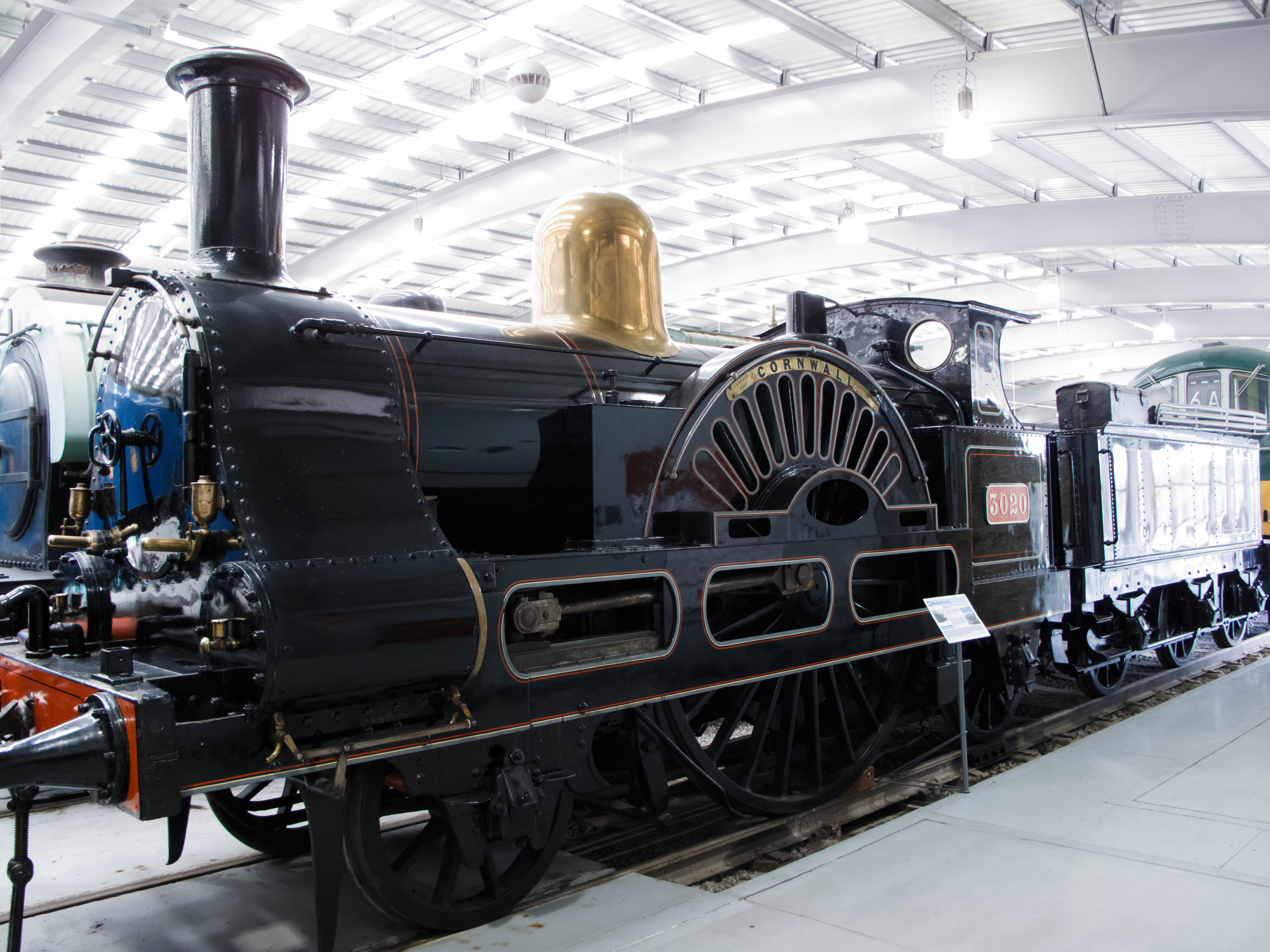
Cornwall on display at Locomotion, Shildon

It is owned by the National Railway Museum and resides at Buckinghamshire Railway Centre.

== Similar locomotives ==
Preserved, or else well-described on Wikipedia

- GJR Columbine (1840s)
- GWR Firefly class (1840)
- GNR Stirling 4-2-2 (1870)
- Midland Railway 115 Class (1896)

== See also ==
- Crampton locomotive
