= Babcock & Wilcox Ltd =

Babcock & Wilcox Ltd was a United Kingdom company formed in 1891 with an initial capital of £240,000. It operated outside the sphere of operation of Babcock & Wilcox which was confined to the US and Cuba. Their headquarters were originally in Queen Victoria Street moving to Oriel House, Farringdon Street, London EC1 in the 1910s.
