= Francis Trevithick =

Locomotive engineer

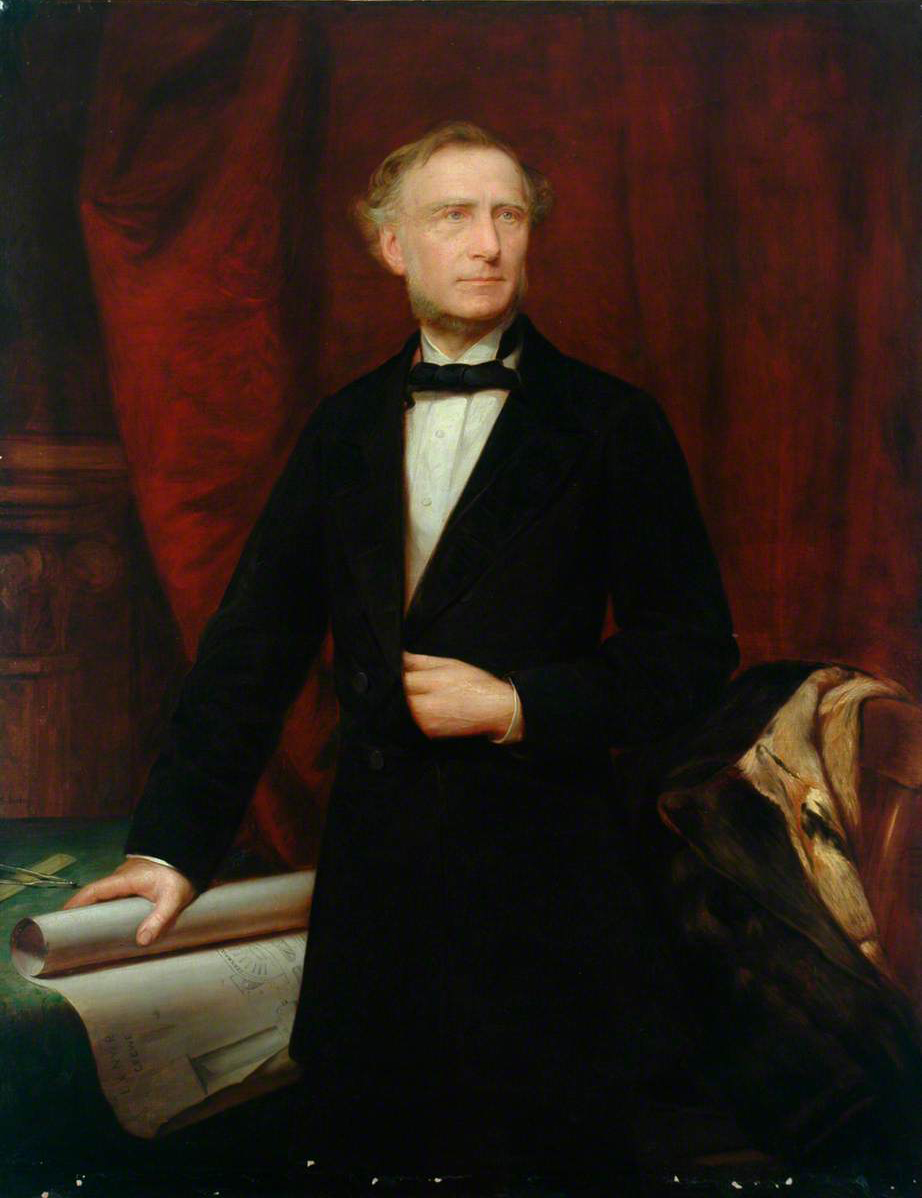
- by Unknown artist, holding a drawing of his locomotive Cornwall
- Born: 1812
- Died: 27 October 1877 (aged 64–65); Penzance
- Children: Arthur Reginald Trevithick; Frederick Harvey Trevithick; Richard Francis Trevithick
- Parent(s): Richard Trevithick; Jane Trevithick (née Harvey)
- Engineering career
- Discipline: Civil engineer Locomotive engineer
- Employer(s): Grand Junction Railway; London and North Western Railway
- Significant design: 4-2-2 locomotive Cornwall

Francis Trevithick (1812–1877), from Camborne, Cornwall, was one of the first locomotive engineers of the London and North Western Railway (LNWR).

== Life ==
Born in 1812 as the son of Richard Trevithick, he began the study of civil engineering around 1832, and by 1840 was employed by the Grand Junction Railway (GJR).

After leaving the LNWR he returned to Cornwall and became factor of the Trehidy estates, of which his grandfather had been mineral agent in the 18th century. He wrote a biography of his father and, in 1872, had it published. He died at Penzance on 27 October 1877 and was buried there.

His son, Arthur Reginald Trevithick (1858-1939), worked for many years on the LNWR, including several years as assistant locomotive works manager at Crewe. Another son, Frederick Harvey Trevithick (1852-1931), worked for both the Great Western Railway and the Egyptian State Railways and at the latter advanced to Chief Mechanical Engineer. Another son, Richard Francis Trevithick (1845-1913) originally worked on the LNER, but later worked for Rosaario Cordova Railway in Argentine, CME Ceylon Government Railways and then joined Japan's Imperial Government Railways where he was the Locomotive Superintendent responsible for the first locomotive to be constructed in Japan (at Kobe).

=== Career ===
- 1840 Appointed resident engineer on the GJR between Birmingham and Crewe
- 1841 Appointed Locomotive Superintendent of the GJR at Edge Hill railway works, Liverpool
- 1843 Transferred to the new works at Crewe as Locomotive Superintendent. Trevithick's foreman at Crewe was Alexander Allan, who handled much of the design work.
- 1846 When the GJR became part of the LNWR, Francis Trevithick became Locomotive Superintendent of the Northern Division. His opposite number on the Southern Division (formerly the London and Birmingham Railway), was Edward Bury until his resignation in 1847, and from March in that year J. E. McConnell.
- 1857 Northern and North Eastern (formerly the Manchester and Birmingham Railway) Divisions of the LNWR were combined. The Locomotive Superintendent on the North Eastern Division was John Ramsbottom, who took over at Crewe and Trevithick was obliged to resign.

On 2 September 1848 Trevithick was aboard a light engine which struck the wreckage of an earlier derailment and was itself derailed, near Newton Road railway station.

== See also ==
- LNWR 2-2-2 3020 Cornwall
- Locomotives of the London and North Western Railway

Preceded by (First locomotive engineer)	Chief Mechanical Engineer of the Northern Division of the London and North Western Railway; 1846–1857	Succeeded by John Ramsbottom
