= List of Liverpool and Manchester Railway locomotives =

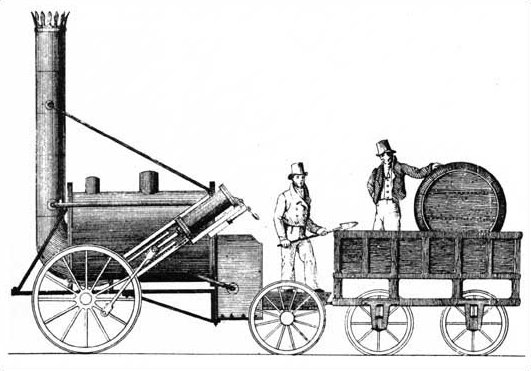
Stephenson's Rocket of 1829

This is a list of locomotives that were used or trialled on the Liverpool and Manchester Railway (L&MR) during its construction, at the Rainhill Trials, and until absorption by the Grand Junction Railway in 1845.

The rate of progress led to quite a rapid turnover in the operating roster. Writing in 1835, Count de Pambour found that of the L&MR's then thirty engines, ten were seen as obsolete and day-to-day work was concentrated on only ten or eleven of the remainder, the remaining third being under repair or kept as backup. By 1840 only ten remained of the first 32 engines; and of a list of engines in use in 1844, fewer than half were even five years old.

Locomotives were often also substantially rebuilt. According to de Pambour again, observing the railway in 1834,

"... what is meant by repairs to the engines is nothing less than their complete re-construction; that is to say that when an engine requires any repair, unless it is for some trifling accident, it is taken to pieces and a new one is constructed, which receives the same name as the first, and in the construction of which are made to serve all such parts of the old engine as are still capable of being used with advantage. The consequence of this is that a reconstructed or repaired engine is literally a new one. The repairs amount thus to considerable sums, but they include also the renewal of the engines."

== Locomotives ==
L&MR No.	Name	Builder	Builder No.	Date built	Wheel arrangement	LNWR No.	Notes
	Lancashire Witch	Robert Stephenson and Company		1828	0-4-0	—	Built for Bolton and Leigh Railway but leased to L&MR.
	Twin Sisters	Robert Stephenson and Company		1829	0-6-0	—	Twin vertical boilers. Used in the construction of the line.
	Cycloped	Thomas Shaw Brandreth		1829		—	Horse powered, unsuccessful Rainhill Trials entrant.
	Novelty	Ericsson & Braithwaite		1829	0-2-2VBWT	—	Rebuilt by Robert Daglish and sold to St Helens and Runcorn Gap Railway 3 August 1833. Replica built in 1929 incorporates original wheels and one cylinder.
	Perseverance	Timothy Burstall		1829	0-4-0	—	
	Sans Pareil	Timothy Hackworth		1829	0-4-0	—	Leased to Bolton and Leigh Railway in 1831
	William IV	Ericsson & Braithwaite		1830	0-2-2	—	
	Queen Adelaide	Ericsson & Braithwaite		1830	0-2-2	—	
	Liverpool	Edward Bury and Company		1830	0-4-0	—	First of the Bury Bar Frame locomotives. Ran well, but strongly opposed by George Stephenson. Finally vetoed because of its 6-foot large wheels.
	Manchester	Galloway, Bowman & Glasgow		1831	2-2-0	—	
	Hecate					—	
1	Rocket	Robert Stephenson and Company	19	1829	0-2-2	—	Participated in Opening Ceremony, driven by Joseph Locke Sold to Lord Carlisle, donated to Patent Office Museum in 1862. Preserved. Contrary to popular belief, George Stephenson had nothing to do with the design or building of this locomotive.
2	Arrow	Robert Stephenson and Company		1830	0-2-2	—	Participated in Opening Ceremony, driven by Frederick Swanwick. Had previously pulled the first full Directors' run, from Liverpool to Manchester and back, on 14 June 1830.
3	Wildfire	Robert Stephenson and Company		1830	0-2-2	—	Later renamed Meteor
4	Dart	Robert Stephenson and Company		1830	0-2-2	—	Participated in Opening Ceremony, driven by Thomas Gooch.
5	Comet	Robert Stephenson and Company		1830	0-2-2	—	Participated in Opening Ceremony, driven by William Allcard.
6	Phoenix	Robert Stephenson and Company		1830	0-2-2	—	Participated in Opening Ceremony, driven by Robert Stephenson
7	Northumbrian	Robert Stephenson and Company		1830	0-2-2	—	Enlarged version of Rocket, Lead locomotive in opening procession, driven by George Stephenson
8	North Star	Robert Stephenson and Company		1830	0-2-2	—	Participated in opening ceremony.
9	Planet	Robert Stephenson and Company		1830	2-2-0	—	
10	Majestic	Robert Stephenson and Company		1830	2-2-0	—	Listed as 2-2-0 in L&M record, but may have been 0-2-2 similar to Northumbrian
11	Mercury	Robert Stephenson and Company		1830	2-2-0	—	Rebuilt as 2-2-2 in 1833
12	Mars	Robert Stephenson and Company		1830	2-2-0	—	
13	Samson	Robert Stephenson and Company		1831	0-4-0	—	For media, see
14	Jupiter	Robert Stephenson and Company		1831	2-2-0	—	
15	Goliah	Robert Stephenson and Company		1831	0-4-0	—	Name also listed as Goliath
16	Saturn	Robert Stephenson and Company		1831	2-2-0	—	
17	Sun	Robert Stephenson and Company		1831	2-2-0	—	
18	Venus	Robert Stephenson and Company		1831	2-2-0	—	
19	Vulcan	Fenton, Murray & Co.		1831	2-2-0	—	
20	Etna	Robert Stephenson and Company		1831	2-2-0	—	
21	Fury	Fenton, Murray & Co.		1831	2-2-0	—	
22	Victory	Robert Stephenson and Company		1831	2-2-0	—	
23	Atlas	Robert Stephenson and Company		1832	0-4-0	—	Rebuilt as 0-4-2, Renewed in 1842 as No. 81
24	Vesta	Robert Stephenson and Company		1832	2-2-0	—	
25	Milo	Robert Stephenson and Company		1832	0-4-0	—	
26	Liver	Edward Bury and Company		1832	2-2-0	—	Between Jan 1832 and Mar 1834 Liver worked a greater mileage than any other locomotive. In trials against Planet in June 1832 Liver was found to be more economical; but there were no further orders.
27	Pluto	Robert Stephenson and Company		1832	2-2-0	127 †	Rebuilt as 2-2-2 in 1841; renumbered 9.
28	Caledonian	Galloway, Bowman & Glasgow		1832	0-4-0	—	
29	Ajax	Robert Stephenson and Company		1832	2-2-0	—	
30	Leeds	Fenton, Murray & Co.		1833	2-2-0	—	
31	Firefly	Robert Stephenson and Company		1833	2-2-0	—	
32	Experiment	Sharp, Roberts and Company		1833	2-2-0	—	Driven by bell cranks.
33	Patentee	Robert Stephenson and Company		1834	2-2-2	—	
34	Titan	Charles Tayleur and Company	8	1834	0-4-0	—	Rebuilt as 0-4-2
35	Orion	Charles Tayleur and Company	9	1834	0-4-0	—	Rebuilt as 0-4-2
36	Swiftsure	George Forrester and Company		1834	2-2-0	—	A "Boxer", with outside cylinders; rebuilt as 2-2-2
37	Rapid	Charles Tayleur and Company	17	1835	2-2-2	—	
38	Speedwell	Charles Tayleur and Company	19	1835	2-2-2	—	
39	Hercules	Mather, Dixon and Company		1835	0-4-0	—	Rebuilt as 0-4-2
40	Eclipse	Charles Tayleur and Company	29	1835	0-4-2	—	Rebuilt as 0-4-2
41	Star	Charles Tayleur and Company	30	1836	2-2-2	165	Renumbered 53; rebuilt as 0-4-2
42	York	Charles Tayleur and Company	31	1836	0-4-2	—	
43	Vesuvius	Haigh Foundry		1836	2-2-2	—	
44	Thunderer	Mather, Dixon and Company		1836	0-4-2	—	
45	Lightning	Haigh Foundry		1836	2-2-2	114	
46	Cyclops	Haigh Foundry		1836	2-2-2	—	Modified in 1839 by John Gray with expansion gear.
47	Milo	Charles Tayleur and Company	32	1836	2-2-2	—	
48	Dart	Mather, Dixon and Company		1836	2-2-2	—	
49	Phoenix	Charles Tayleur and Company	33	1836	2-2-2	—	
50	Majestic	Charles Tayleur and Company	46	1837	2-2-2	—	
51	Etna	Charles Tayleur and Company	47	1837	2-2-2	—	
52	Arrow	Mather, Dixon and Company		1837	2-2-2	—	
53	Sun	R & W Hawthorn		1837	2-2-2	164	
54	Meteor	Mather, Dixon and Company		1837	2-2-2	115 †	
55	Comet	Mather, Dixon and Company		1837	2-2-2	166	
56	Vesta	R & W Hawthorn		1837	2-2-2	—	
57	Lion	Todd, Kitson & Laird		1838	0-4-2	116	Sold to Mersey Docks in 1859 for use as a stationary pump, worked in that role until 1928. Preserved.
58	Tiger	Todd, Kitson & Laird		1838	0-4-2	117	Scrapped in 1850
59	Rokeby	Rothwell and Company		1838	2-2-2	—	Renumbered 52
60	Roderic	Rothwell and Company		1838	2-2-2	118	Renumbered 20
61	Mammoth	T. Banks & Co.		1839	0-4-2	—	Renumbered 30
62	Leopard	Todd, Kitson & Laird		1839	2-2-2	—	
63	Mastodon	T. Banks & Co.		1839	2-2-2	119	Renumbered 56
64	Panther	Todd, Kitson & Laird		1839	2-2-2	—	
65	Elephant	Todd, Kitson & Laird		1839	0-4-2	113	Renumbered 34
66	Samson	Benjamin Hick and Sons		1839	0-4-2	120	renumbered 35
67	Buffalo	Todd, Kitson & Laird		1839	0-4-2	121; 121A; 1106	Renumbered 50; rebuilt as 2-2-2T in 1860
68	Goliah	Benjamin Hick and Sons		1839	0-4-2	122	Renumbered 51. Name also listed as Goliath
69	Victoria	Mather, Dixon and Company		1839	2-2-2 or 0-4-2	123	Renumbered 1 in 1841
69	Swallow	L&M Edge Hill Works		September 1841	2-2-2	128	
70	Martin	L&M Edge Hill Works		January 1842	2-2-2	129	
71	Kingfisher	L&M Edge Hill Works		September 1841	2-2-2	131	
72	Heron	L&M Edge Hill Works		November 1841	2-2-2	130	
73	Pelican	L&M Edge Hill Works		December 1841	2-2-2	132	
74	Ostrich	L&M Edge Hill Works		February 1842	2-2-2	133	
75	Owl	L&M Edge Hill Works		March 1842	0-4-2	134	
76	Bat	L&M Edge Hill Works		June 1842	0-4-2	135	
77	Stork	L&M Edge Hill Works		May 1842	2-2-2	136	
78	Crane	L&M Edge Hill Works		October 1842	2-2-2	137	
79	Swan	L&M Edge Hill Works		September 1842	2-2-2	138	
80	Cygnet	L&M Edge Hill Works		December 1842	2-2-2	139	
81	Atlas	L&M Edge Hill Works		November 1842	0-4-2	140	
82	Pheasant	L&M Edge Hill Works		January 1842	2-2-2	141	
83	Partridge	L&M Edge Hill Works		June 1843	2-2-2	126	
84	Bittern	L&M Edge Hill Works		April 1843	0-4-2	142	
85	Lapwing	L&M Edge Hill Works		October 1843	0-4-2	143	
86	Raven	L&M Edge Hill Works		December 1843	0-4-2	144	
87	Crow	L&M Edge Hill Works		January 1844	0-4-2	145	
88	Redwing	L&M Edge Hill Works		April 1844	2-2-2	146	
89	Woodlark	L&M Edge Hill Works		January 1845	2-2-2	147	
90	Penguin	L&M Edge Hill Works		October 1844	0-4-2	148	
91	Petrel	L&M Edge Hill Works		July 1844	0-4-2	149	
92	Linnet	L&M Edge Hill Works		February 1845	2-2-2	150	
93	Goldfinch	L&M Edge Hill Works		February 1845	2-2-2	151	
94	Bullfinch	L&M Edge Hill Works		May 1845	2-2-2	152	
95	Chaffinch	L&M Edge Hill Works		May 1845	2-2-2	153	
96	Starling	L&M Edge Hill Works		July 1845	0-4-2	154	
97	Owzell	L&M Edge Hill Works		November 1845	0-4-2	155	
98	Redstart	L&M Edge Hill Works		December 1845	0-4-2	156	
99	Redbreast	L&M Edge Hill Works		September 1845	0-4-2	157	
100	Condor	L&M Edge Hill Works		March 1846	2-2-2	158	
101	Adjutant	L&M Edge Hill Works		March 1846	0-4-2	159	
102	Flamingo	L&M Edge Hill Works		March 1846	0-4-2	160	
103	Cuckoo	L&M Edge Hill Works		March 1846	0-4-2	161	
104	Albatross	L&M Edge Hill Works		June 1846	0-4-2	162	
106	Osprey	L&M Edge Hill Works		July 1846	0-4-2	163	

† Number allocated but not applied
