= Farcot =

Farcot is a surname. Notable people with the surname include:

- Eugène Farcot (1830–1896), French clock-maker, inventor and mechanical engineer
- Marie-Joseph Farcot (1798–1875), French engineer, inventor and manufacturer, working mainly with steam engines, father of Joseph Farcot
- Joseph Farcot (1824–1908), French engineer and industrialist

== See also ==
- Farcot’s bark-cutting machine, used extensively in France; see bark mill
