= Fernihough =

Fernihough is a surname. Notable people with the surname include:

- Eric Fernihough (1905–1938), British motorcycle racer
- William Fernihough (active 19th century), British locomotive superintendent
