= LMR 57 Lion =

Liverpool and Manchester Railway steam locomotive

Liverpool and Manchester Railway 57 Lion
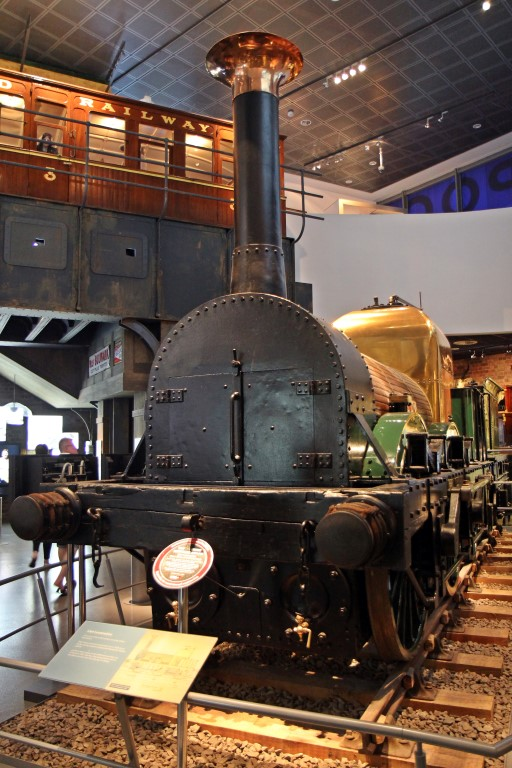
- Lion now preserved at the Museum of Liverpool
Type and origin
- Power type: Steam
- Builder: Todd, Kitson & Laird
- Build date: 1838; 188 years ago
Specifications
- Configuration
  - Whyte: 0-4-2
  - UIC: B1’ n2
- Driver dia.: 5 ft 0 in (1.524 m)
- Trailing dia.: 3 ft 1 in (0.940 m)
- Boiler pressure: 50 psi (0.34 MPa)
- Cylinders: Two, inside
- Cylinder size: 14 in × 18 in (356 mm × 457 mm)
Performance figures
- Tractive effort: 2,160 lbf (9.6 kN)
Career
- Operators: Liverpool and Manchester Railway (until 1859), Mersey Docks and Harbour Board
- Locale: Great Britain
- First run: August 1838
- Withdrawn: 1859
- Disposition: Used as stationary boiler 1875-1920s, now preserved.

The Liverpool and Manchester Railway (LMR) 57 Lion is an early 0-4-2 steam locomotive, which had a top speed of 40 mph (64 km/h) and could pull up to 200 tons (203 tonnes). One of a pair designed for hauling freight (the other, number 58, was called Tiger), Lion was built by Todd, Kitson & Laird of Leeds in 1838. It featured in the 1953 Ealing comedy, The Titfield Thunderbolt.

== History ==
=== 19th century ===
Lion was ordered by the LMR in October 1837 as one of an order of six locomotives from Todd, Kitson & Laird of Leeds. They were built according to the patents of Robert Stephenson for a 6-wheeled locomotive and that of LMR Locomotive Superintendent John Melling, and included several of his patent ideas: hollow water filled firebars, a pre-heating tank beneath the firebox into which waste steam from the safety valve could be directed, Melling's patent radial valve gear, and a coupling wheel to aid adhesion. Lion and its sister Tiger were 0-4-2 'luggage' engines for working goods trains. They had 11 in × 20 in (280 mm × 510 mm) cylinders, 5 ft (1.52 m) driving wheels, 3 ft 1 in (0.94 m) carrying wheels, and 50 psi (340 kPa) boilers that were 7 ft 4 in (2.24 m) long and slightly oval in cross section.

Lion was rebuilt at Edge Hill by the LMR in 1841 with a new boiler 8 ft 6 in (2.59 m) long, which necessitated the building of longer frames, new 12 in × 18 in (300 mm × 460 mm) cylinders, new valves and valve chests, and a new valve gear as designed by William Barber Buddicom in 1840–1841. Lion's present cylinders are 14 1/8 in × 18 in (360 mm × 460 mm), indicating that they were changed at a later date.

In 1845, the LMR was absorbed by the Grand Junction Railway (GJR), which in turn was one of the constituents of the London and North Western Railway (LNWR) a year later. Lion was re-numbered 116 on the LNWR Northern Division.

It was used in traffic until 1857, when it was transferred to the Stores Department as Ballast Engine No. 14. Lion was sold to the Mersey Docks and Harbour Board in May 1859 for £400 to work the internal system of the Docks & Harbour Board in Liverpool. A new boiler (that was probably the present boiler carried by the engine) was fitted by the Harbour Board in 1865.

=== Rediscovery and restoration ===
Around 1874, Lion was retired to work as a pumping engine at the Graving Dock facility at Prince's Dock which came into use in January 1875. It was "rediscovered" in 1923 and then rescued by members of the Liverpool Engineering Society in 1928 when it was replaced by an electric pump, and then renovated by Crewe Works. Lion's tender had long since been scrapped, so a new one was built by Crewe using parts from a scrapped Furness Railway tender, originally built by Sharp, Stewart of Manchester. Other work included a new chimney, new smokebox doors, wheel splashers, foot plate and cab guard rails, boiler lagging and boiler tubes, the fitting of a mechanical lubricator and new boiler fittings. The cylinders were also probably re-bored. A controversial copper cover was fitted over the high-crowned wagon-top firebox to simulate the cloister vault haycock firebox of the 1840s period.

Following restoration, Lion took part in the Liverpool and Manchester Railway Centenary exhibition during September 1930 in Wavertree Playground, where it ran round a circular track pulling specially-constructed replica carriages which are now preserved in the National Railway Museum. The locomotive was then moved to a pedestal at Liverpool Lime Street station where it stood until 1937. It was then reactivated to appear in the film Victoria the Great at Denham Studios and participate in a publicity stunt on the line between Llandudno Junction and Colwyn Bay, where it ran at slow speed side-by-side with ex-LNWR George the Fifth Class No. 5348 Coronation and the newly-introduced Coronation Scot service. Lion also featured in the London and Birmingham Railway centenary at Euston station in 1938. It was moved back to Crewe Works for storage during the war years.

=== Postwar ===
In early 1951, the locomotive was removed from storage and reconditioned to appear in the film The Lady with a Lamp, which retold the story of Florence Nightingale. It was used for a train station scene filmed at Cole Green railway station in Hertfordshire.

Not long after, Lion was selected to feature in the role it is most known for, the title subject of the 1953 film The Titfield Thunderbolt, for which it featured prominently during filming on the Limpley Stoke-Camerton branch line. Due to the extensive nature of the film shoot, it was discovered that Lion would often blow off steam between takes, so a damper and a steam pressure gauge were fitted in order to help control the flow in the boiler. The locomotive was accidentally jolted in the scene where its separated inspection train did not slow down sufficiently when pushed by a banking engine and it forced the tender to strike the footplate, the damage of which is still visible today. Lion was the second oldest locomotive to be steamed in this period, the oldest being the British-built American locomotive John Bull.

In 1967, Lion was loaned to the then-Liverpool Museum and presented outright to them in 1970. In 1979–1980 it was removed from display again to be restored by Rustons Diesels Ltd. for the Liverpool and Manchester Railway 150th Anniversary Celebrations. New boiler tubes were fitted; the original main steam pipe was replaced; because the original plug regulator was cracked, a new one was cast and fitted; new boiler fittings, including bourdon-type pressure gauge, gauge glass and try-cocks were fitted. New wash out plugs were also provided. The front buffer beam (not original) was reinforced with channel section. Safety chains were fitted and the tender equipped with air brakes taken from a commercial HGV. The boiler certificate issued by BR was for four years.

Lion last operated at the Birmingham Railway Museum at Tyseley on an open day in 1988 before returning to static display status permanently. Between 1999 and 2007, Lion was on display at the Museum of Science and Industry in Manchester alongside replica LMR locomotive Planet whilst the new Museum of Liverpool was being built. On 27 February 2007, Lion was moved by road from Manchester to Liverpool. It underwent a cosmetic restoration by Liverpool Museums in 2008 before going on display in the new museum.

== Identity ==
In his 2021 book Lion: The Story of the Real Titfield Thunderbolt, railway historian Anthony Dawson suggests that there is no evidence besides oral tradition that the locomotive discovered in 1923 and now preserved as Lion is in fact LMR locomotive 57 Lion, and suggests that it could be one of a number of other locomotives acquired by the Mersey Docks and Harbour Board at around the same time.

== See also ==
- List of Liverpool and Manchester Railway locomotives
- 1846 American locomotive The Lion
