= George Forrester and Company =

British marine engine and locomotive manufacturer

Coordinates: 53.4124°N 2.9886°W

George Forrester and Co.
- Type: General partnership
- Industry: Engineering; Heavy industry
- Founded: 1827
- Founder: George Forrester
- Defunct: 1890
- Fate: Liquidation
- Headquarters: Vauxhall Foundry, 40 Vauxhall Road, Liverpool, United Kingdom
- Key people: Alexander Allan; Charles Hodgson Horsfall; Walter Fergus MacGregor; Benjamin Hick Jr. Anthony Bower; Andrew Wylie; John McFarlane Gray

George Forrester and Company was a British marine engine and locomotive manufacturer at Vauxhall Foundry in Liverpool, established by Scottish engineer George Forrester (born 1780/81). The company opened in 1827 as iron founders and commenced building steam locomotives in 1834.

== History ==
The company was noted in Liverpool directories from 1827 as "Iron founders", the works established in the former "Union Mill" cotton factory, known locally as the "Welsh Factory", built by Messrs. Kirkman & Co. on the east side of Vauxhall Road in the late eighteenth century, but closed after a few years, remaining empty for some time thereafter. The factory was later enlarged and the original building demolished.

A significant product for the company in its early days was the production of machinery involved in sugar processing for the West Indies, before branching into marine engines. Railway locomotives were produced from 1834 to 1847. The Crimean War saw the factory stretched to its maximum output in order to produce ammunition, they also manufactured Blakey rifles.

=== Locomotives ===
Under Alexander Allan's attendance the first locomotives were 2-2-0 types, one early in 1834 for the Liverpool and Manchester Railway called Swiftsure and three later that year, Kingstown, Dublin and Vauxhall for the Dublin and Kingstown Railway. In 1835, the Dublin and Kingstown Railway ordered two tank locomotives, Victoria and Comet, these being the first tank locomotives in public service. Two others of the same type produced for the London and Greenwich Railway between 1836 and 1837 were the first in England. Two 2-2-0 locomotives named Forrester and Buck were supplied to the Manchester and Bolton Railway ready for the opening of that line in May 1838. Four locomoves, Cheltenham, Worcester, Bromsgrove and Tewkesbury were also supplied to the Birmingham and Gloucester Railway via Edward Bury, the first two arriving for November of the same year.

==== Innovations ====
They were groundbreaking in that for the first time horizontal cylinders were mounted at the front of the locomotive outside the frame. Forrester also used four fixed eccentrics, rather than two loose ones to operate the valve gear. A single linkage operated the whole arrangement at once, rather than having four for the driver to operate, the handles no longer rocking to and fro while the locomotive was in motion.

==== Stability problems ====
Forrester's engines were extremely successful for their time, but the outside cylinders and cranks caused the locomotives to sway so much that they were referred to as "Boxers". From 1834 an extra trailing axle was added for some for the Liverpool and Manchester Railway. The Dublin and Kingston Railway also converted all their Forrester engines to 2-2-2WT well tank engines by 1841, the process being described as "not difficult".

==== 1840s ====
Three 2-4-0 locomotives were supplied to the London & Brighton Railway between October 1842 and March 1843. John Urpeth Rastrick inspected the locomotives, which were designed for freight, at the factory and confirmed the workmanship was good but required his own modifications and alterations.

Under James Cudworth's supervision, on 6 October 1844 the South Eastern Railway (SER) ordered six Stephenson "long boiler" pattern goods 2-4-0 from a "Robert Browne of Liverpool" though this seemed to be way disguising the manufacturer as Forresters which whom a director had a familial connection.

The largest order was for fifteen 2-4-0s in 1847 for the South Eastern Railway. These like the three for the London & Brighton Railway, were of the Stephenson "long boiler" pattern.

==== Influence ====
Between 1840 and 1844, the Dublin and Kingstown Railway built five locomotives at its Grand Canal Street Railway works to a design that drew heavily on the supplied engines from Forrester.

=== Marine engines ===
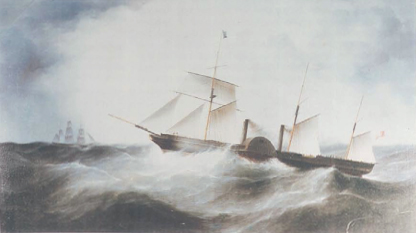
SS Liverpool by Samuel Walters On her first voyage to New York October 1838. Lieutenant R. J. Fayrer, RN Commander. Engines by George Forrester & Co. An east-bound vessel of the Black Ball Line on the horizon.

George Forrester and Company built direct-acting side-lever engines of 464 hp for the 1150ton SS Liverpool, second steam passenger vessel to cross the Atlantic Ocean from Liverpool. The ship was built at Liverpool by Humble and Milcrest for former Lord Mayor of Liverpool, Sir John Tobin and launched in October 1837. Tobin sold her on completion to the Transatlantic Steamship Company, a subsidiary of the City of Dublin Steam Packet Company.

The Liverpool was the first steamship built and fitted up for the transatlantic service and the first transatlantic vessel with two funnels; after making several return journeys to New York she was sold to the Peninsular and Oriental Steam Navigation Company; it was on this vessel that Samuel Cunard came to Liverpool from Halifax, Nova Scotia to commence business as a ship owner. P&O extended the hull of the Liverpool, increasing her tonnage to 1543 while changing the name to Great Liverpool, and put her on the mail service between Southampton and Alexandria; she was holed on a reef 24 February 1846 and went ashore off Cape Finisterre. The surviving wreck is being studied to assess recovery and preservation in a museum.

Forresters built 90 hp steeple engines for the Rainbow, commissioned by the General Steam Navigation Company, also launched in October 1837, thought to be the largest and fastest iron steamship at the time, and a precursor of the ocean-going iron steamer, having an influence on Brunel. The first British ocean-going iron warship Nemesis, ordered by the East India Company, launched in November 1839 was powered by 120 hp Forrester engines. One of the first iron-hulled ships built for the Royal Navy, HMS Birkenhead, launched 30 December 1845 and the first frigate designed for the Navy with an iron hull, was fitted with 564 hp Forrester side-lever steam engines.

In 1846 the firm built 180 hp engines for the Princess Clementine used in 1849 for superintendent of telegraphs for the South Eastern Railway Company, Charles Vincent Walker's successful experiment off Folkestone to pass messages by submarine cable. Walker sent the first submarine telegraph messages to Chairman of the Railway, James MacGregor.

John McFarlane Gray (1831–1908) designed marine engines and various types of machinery for the firm including the first steam-steering gear, retrofitted to the Great Eastern Steamship Company's liner SS Great Eastern in 1867; between 1865 and 1878, the Great Eastern was employed laying submarine cables. The Inman Line's SS City of Brussels was the first vessel fitted with steam-steering after the Great Eastern. Forresters also built engines for the White Star Line ocean liners RMS Atlantic, SS Celtic and SS Republic.

=== Personnel ===
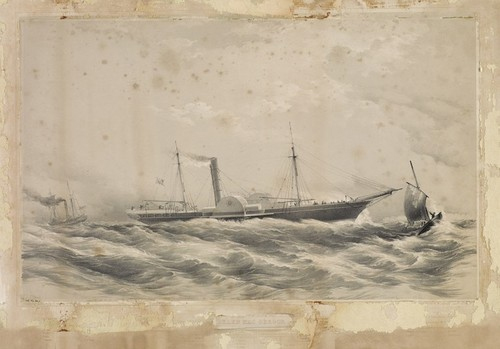
PS Helen MacGregor, lithograph by George Hawkins (1819–1852) from a drawing by Thomas B. Horner, dedicated to Joseph Gee of Hull. "In some of the roughest seas, so well known between Hull and Hamburg, the engines of the Helen Mac Gregor do not seem to suffer the slightest strain in working".

The works manager was Scottish mechanical engineer Alexander Allan (1809–1891) until 1840, when he left to take charge of the workshops of the Grand Junction Railway at Edge Hill, using his experience with Forrester to design the outside-cylinder Crewe-type locomotives.

About the time the firm built engines for the Dublin and Kingstown Railway, William Fernihough served an apprenticeship before moving to Edward Bury; he later gained recognition for his work on locomotive counterbalancing as superintendent of the Eastern Counties Railway.

Benjamin Hick Jr (1818–1845) engineer, formerly of B. Hick and Sons, younger brother of politician John Hick, was working for George Forrester and Co. during 1844 when he presented his improved double-cylinder marine engine to the Society of Arts; a pair equal to 220 hp were built for Scottish shipbuilder John Laird and the 573 ton iron paddle steamer PS Helen MacGregor, sailing between Hull and Hamburg for prominent ship owner Joseph Gee (1802–1860). One of the vessel's notable passengers during June 1847 was the young artist James Abbott McNeill Whistler; the Helen MacGregor was the first Hull steamer in the St Petersburg trade. Benjamin Jr died relatively young in 1845, age 27.

Charles Hodgson Horsfall (1810–1847), younger brother of politician Thomas Horsfall, died two years later in 1847.

Partner in the firm, also from a Scottish family, Walter Fergus MacGregor (1812–1863) was the younger brother of James MacGregor (1808–1858), politician, Chairman and General Manager of the South Eastern Railway. MacGregor's mother was also christened Helen.

Following an apprenticeship with Robert Daglish in Sutton, future Prime Minister of New Zealand, Richard Seddon (1845–1906) attained a Board of Trade Certificate as a mechanical engineer from Forresters before he left for Australia on the SS Great Britain in 1862.

Walter Fergus MacGregor has a stained glass window and memorial dedicated to his memory in St George's Church, Everton, also the last resting place of Charles Hodgson Horsfall, it reads:

This Monument is erected by
a few of his numerous friends
as a testimony of his great worth
and many excellencies, and the
unfeigned love and esteem they
bear to his memory.

MacGregor's second son, Reverend William MacGregor (1848–1937), used his inherited wealth as benefactor to the town of Tamworth, Staffordshire and became a leading Egyptologist and collector of Egyptian antiquities. He eventually held the position of Vice President of the Liverpool Institute of Archaeology. Items from MacGregor's collection are housed in the Ashmolean Museum, British Museum and Museum of Egyptian Antiquities, Swansea.

==== Professionalism ====
During the construction of the first locomotives for the Dublin and Kingstown Railway officers and directors on several occasions visited the works of both Forrester and Sharp, Stewart and Company of Manchester, who were both constructing three engines each for their new railway. They noted visits to Forresters gave them little cause for concern whereas at Sharps the mechanics were at times found to be partaking of "too ardent feasting at craft clubs" with related absenteeism and irregularities.

=== Closure ===
Locomotive building finished around 1847, thereafter the firm diversified, closing in 1890. Nothing remains of the former sites at 234, 224 and 40 Vauxhall Road, Liverpool.

== See also ==
- Hibernia (locomotive)

== Sources ==
- Ahrons, E.L. (1927). The British Steam Railway Locomotive 1825-1925. Amen Corner, London: Locomotive Publishing Co.
- Bardell, Peter Sidney (December 1988). The Balancing of Steam Locomotives: A Dynamical Problem of the Nineteenth and Twentieth Centuries (PhD). University of London.
- Bradley, D. L. (1963). The Locomotives of the South Eastern Railway. Railway Correspondence and Travel Society.
- Bradley, D.L. (September 1985) [1963]. The Locomotive History of the South Eastern Railway (2nd ed.). London: RCTS. ISBN 0-901115-48-7.
- Brooking, Tom (2014). Richard Seddon: King of God's Own. Auckland: Penguin. ISBN 9780143569671.
- Hamer, David A. (2014). Seddon, Richard John (1845–1906). Wellington: Te Ara: The Encyclopedia of New Zealand.
- Institution of Mechanical Engineers (1891). "Proceedings 1891". Institution of Mechanical Engineers. London.
- Long, P. J.; Awdry, W. V. (1987). The Birmingham and Gloucester Railway. Gloucester: Alan Sutton. ISBN 0862993296. OCLC 18588406. OL 2468738M.
- Lowe, James W. (2014) [1975]. British Steam Locomotives Builders. Pen & Sword Transport. ISBN 978-1-47382-289-4. OCLC 889509628.
- Marshall, John (1972). The Lancashire & Yorkshire Railway, volume 3. Newton Abbot: David & Charles. ISBN 0-7153-5320-9.
- Murray, Kevin (1981). Ireland's First Railway. Dublin: Irish Railway Record Society. ISBN 0-904078-07-8.
- Nock, O. S. (1957). Steam locomotive, the unfinished story of steam locomotives and steam locomotive men on the railways of Great Britain. London: George Allen & Unwin. OCLC 459844615.
- Picton, James Allanson (1875). Memorials of Liverpool : historical and topographical, including a history of the Dock Estate. Vol. 2 — Topographical. London: Longmans, Green. OCLC 1064735880. OL 25685755M.
- Summers, L.A. (2016). Men of Steam : Britain's Locomotive Engineers. OCLC 964914755.
