= William Buddicom =

British mechanical and civil railway engineer (1816–1887)

William Barber Buddicom MInstCE
- Born: 1 July 1816; Everton, Liverpool, England
- Died: 4 August 1887 (aged 71); Penbedw Hall, Flintshire, Wales
- Education: Home taught; Liverpool Apprenticeship
- Spouse: Marie Jeanne Hownam (m. 1845)
- Children: Marthe Louise Buddicom; Ellin Buddicom; Walter Hownam Buddicom; Jeanne Caroline Buddicom; Harry William Buddicom
- Parents: Reverend Robert Pedder Buddicom; Ellin Barber
- Engineering career
- Discipline: Civil engineer; Railway engineer; Locomotive engineer
- Institutions: Royal Society; Institution of Civil Engineers
- Projects: Edge Hill railway works; Mont Cenis Pass Railway
- Significant design: Crewe type (locomotive)

William Barber Buddicom (1 July 1816–4 August 1887) was a British mechanical and civil engineer best known for his pioneering achievements in innovating and expanding railway and locomotive transport through Europe during the mid 19th century.

== Early life ==
Buddicom was born in Everton, Liverpool in 1816, the second son of the Reverend Robert Pedder Buddicom (1781–1846) and Ellin Barber. He was educated at home until, aged fifteen, Buddicom became apprenticed to Mather, Dixon and Company, where he trained for 5 years to become a railway engineer.

== Early career ==
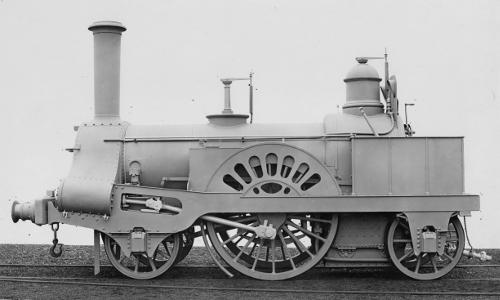
Buddicom's Crewe type locomotive a LNWR 6ft 2-2-2 in photographic grey livery, 1875

Buddicom's first appointment in 1836 was a two-year contract as resident engineer for the Liverpool – Newton Bridge section of the Liverpool and Manchester Railway, the first public railway in the world to use only steam locomotives for passengers and goods. His main challenge was tackling the steep incline of the tunnel section at Edge Hill. Buddicom's successes attracted the attention of Joseph Locke, who offered him a position as resident engineer on the Glasgow-Paisley railway. Buddicom exceeded Locke's expectations, who recommended his promotion to locomotive superintendent of the Grand Junction Railway when he was just twenty-four. This was one of the most prominent railway positions in Europe at the time, which initiated a working partnership that lasted until Locke's death in 1860.

Buddicom focused his attention on reorganising the company and reducing operating expenses including fuel economy, which was not without controversy (ibid.). At the same time, he was working on improving engine design to prevent frequent fracturing of crank axles. The resulting Crewe type (locomotive) is attributed to Buddicom's partnership with Alexander Allan. The board of the Grand Junction Railway evidently recognised Buddicom's strong grasp of both technical and commercial matters, prompting them to offer him the roles of secretary and managership of the company but he and Locke had other ideas.

== Chevalier ==
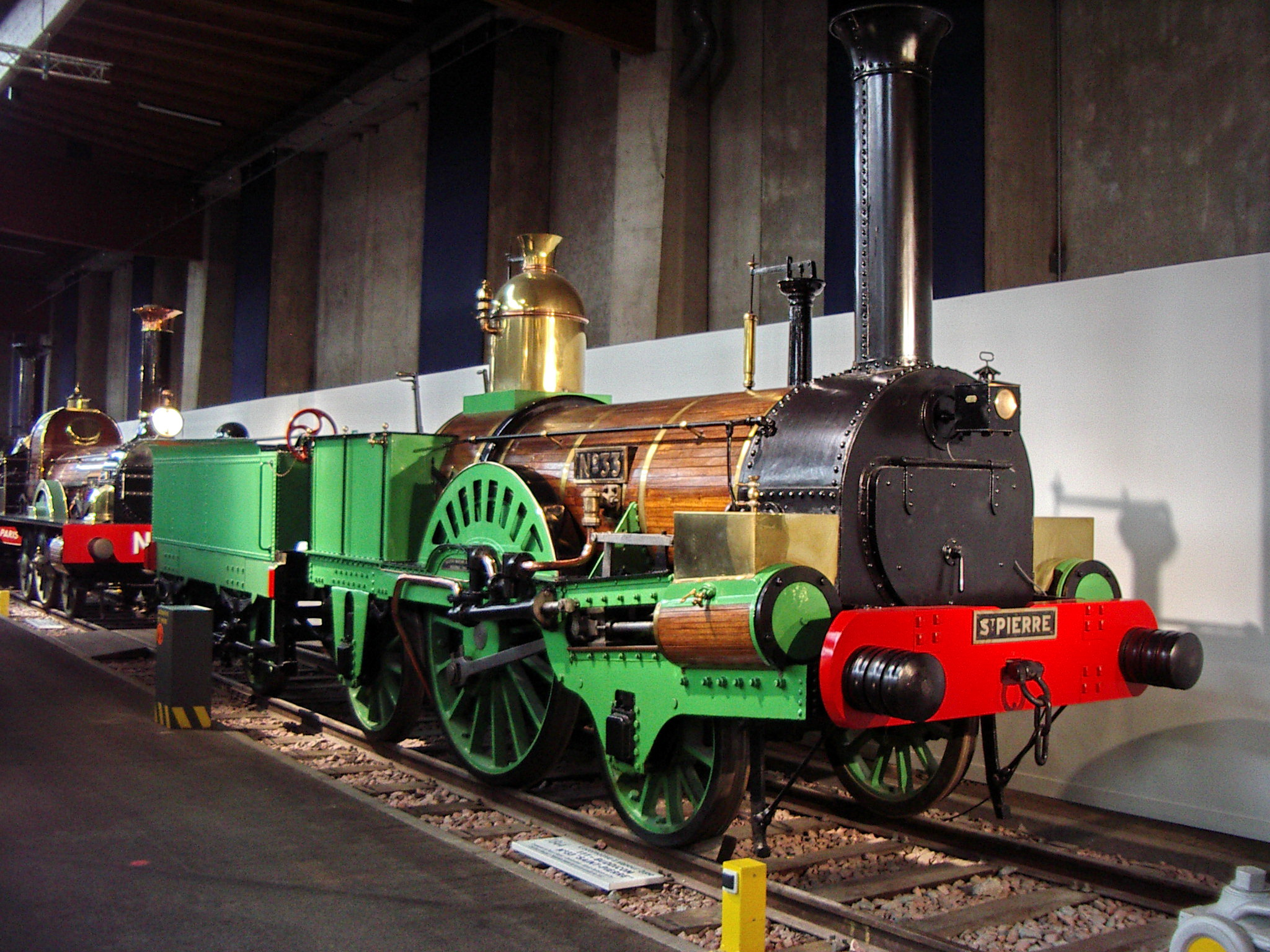
2010 02 08 Locomotive 111-Buddicom, Mulhouse

Railway transport came late to France, which was initiated with Locke's help in 1830. By 1840, the French Government had difficulty making rail projects profitable, which resulted in their falling even further behind Britain in developing railways. Buddicom's reputation for making a profit on railways was the perfect introduction for Locke to present to French authorities, who granted a license to Buddicom to demonstrate how to make the French railways financially viable. In 1841, Buddicom partnered with William Allcard to open up a locomotive and rolling stock construction plant at a former Carthusian convent in Le Petit-Quevilly, near Rouen to supply the Paris – Rouen line with engines and rolling stock. They began by modifying existing French-made engines before adapting Buddicom's successful Crewe-type, assembled by local French workers under license from Britain. A year later in record time, the newly created plant was ready for operation, to the satisfaction of Locke, Directors and the French Government.

Buddicom built 40 locomotives from his Petit-Quevilly plant between 1841 and 1843, including 120, 2nd class coaches and 200 wagons, all destined for the new Paris to Rouen line being constructed by Locke. Buddicom's new 17 ton type 111 locomotive had a top speed of 60 km/h, which remained in service for 70 years. Opening up new lines in Normandy (Le Havre, Fécamp, Mantes, Caen, Cherbourg) required a new larger plant, which Buddicom commissioned in Sotteville-lès-Rouen in 1844. This coincided with a huge surge in investment in the railways, with shares soaring, accompanied by intense speculation. Investor interest allowed Buddicom to manufacture engines for the whole of France, which was opening new lines beyond Normandy (Orléans – Tours, Boulogne – Amiens, Paris – Lyon) so that by 1849, he was supplying engines and stock to four out of six of the great companies operating in France, making huge profits. Buddicom was honoured by King Louis-Philippe I, who made him, along with Joseph Locke, Chevaliers of the Legion of Honour, in gratitude for their services to France.

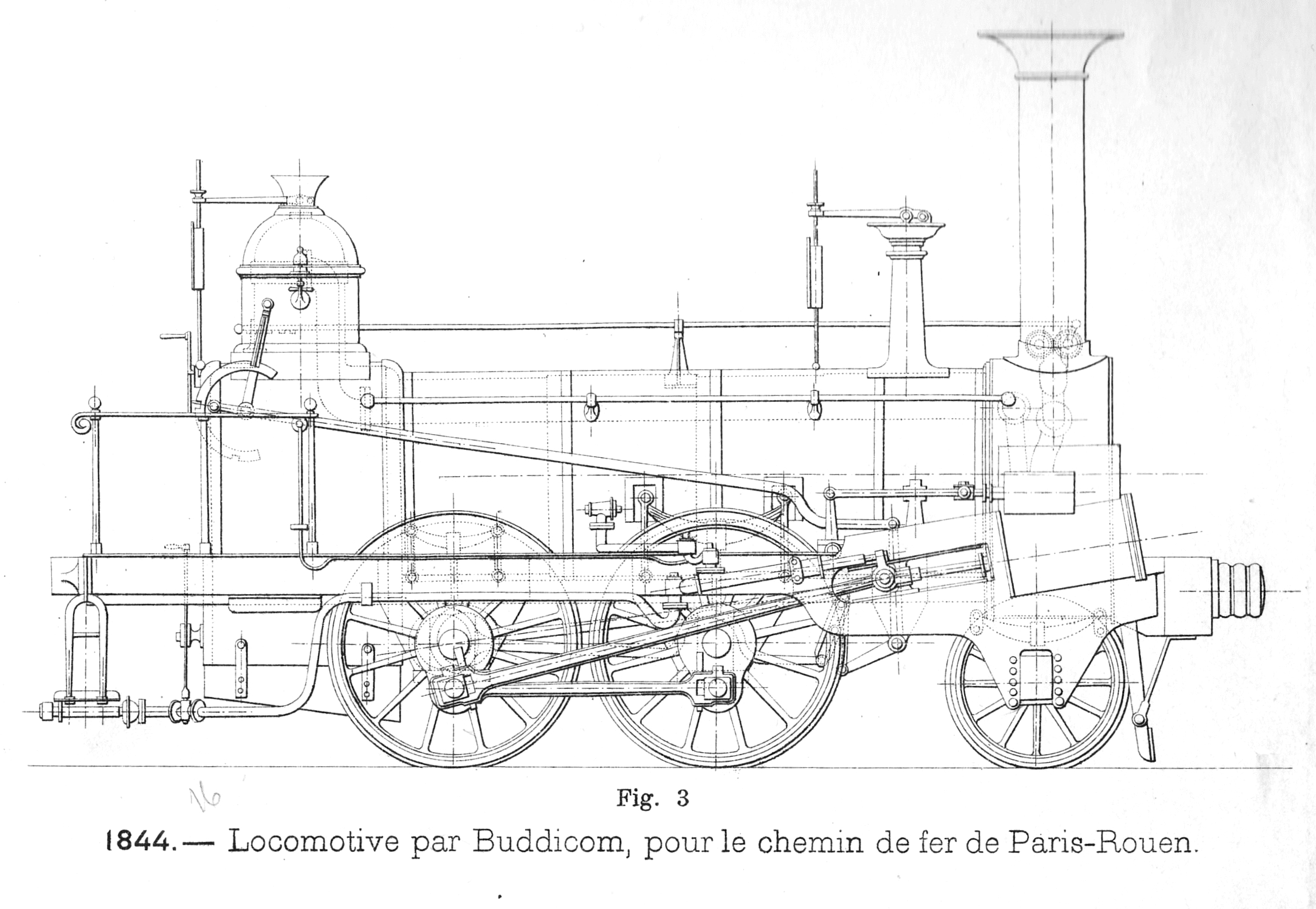
Buddicom later developed the more powerful 23 ton type 120, which the French call "Le Buddicom"

In 1848, a revolution broke out in France, when the railways were still under early construction. The poor state of France's railways hindered aid efforts around the country, focusing attention on foreign rail technicians and assets. New technology in many sectors from agriculture to transport implied a transfer of worker skills, which were not all welcome. Buddicom in particular became the focus of anger and was personally threatened, but was protected by the support of his loyal French work-force.

"…The night was a memorable one, storm and rain intensifying the emotions caused by the sight of the blazing bridge. There was no protection from any one but a few resolute French workmen and clerks, as the English workmen were advised by their comrades in the works to keep out of sight. Several of these men formed themselves into a sort of body-guard to protect Mr. Buddicom, and one man in particular heated some irons in one of the fires, and facing the crowd of mischief-makers, vowed destruction to any one who attempted to harm Mr. Buddicom. These hot irons had a wonderful effect, and though torches were lit, and bottles containing spirits of turpentine were prepared to quicken the fire, the idea was abandoned, thanks to the exertions of the workpeople…

Despite the obvious danger to Buddicom himself, he remained in France with his workers at Rouen and ran a skeleton operation during the uprising, albeit now armed for his own protection. The banking system in France had all but collapsed, resulting in workers not being paid as pay-masters fled the violence. Buddicom appealed to the Bank of France who saw him as financially secure and intervened to release funding to pay his workers for the duration of unrest 1848–1852.

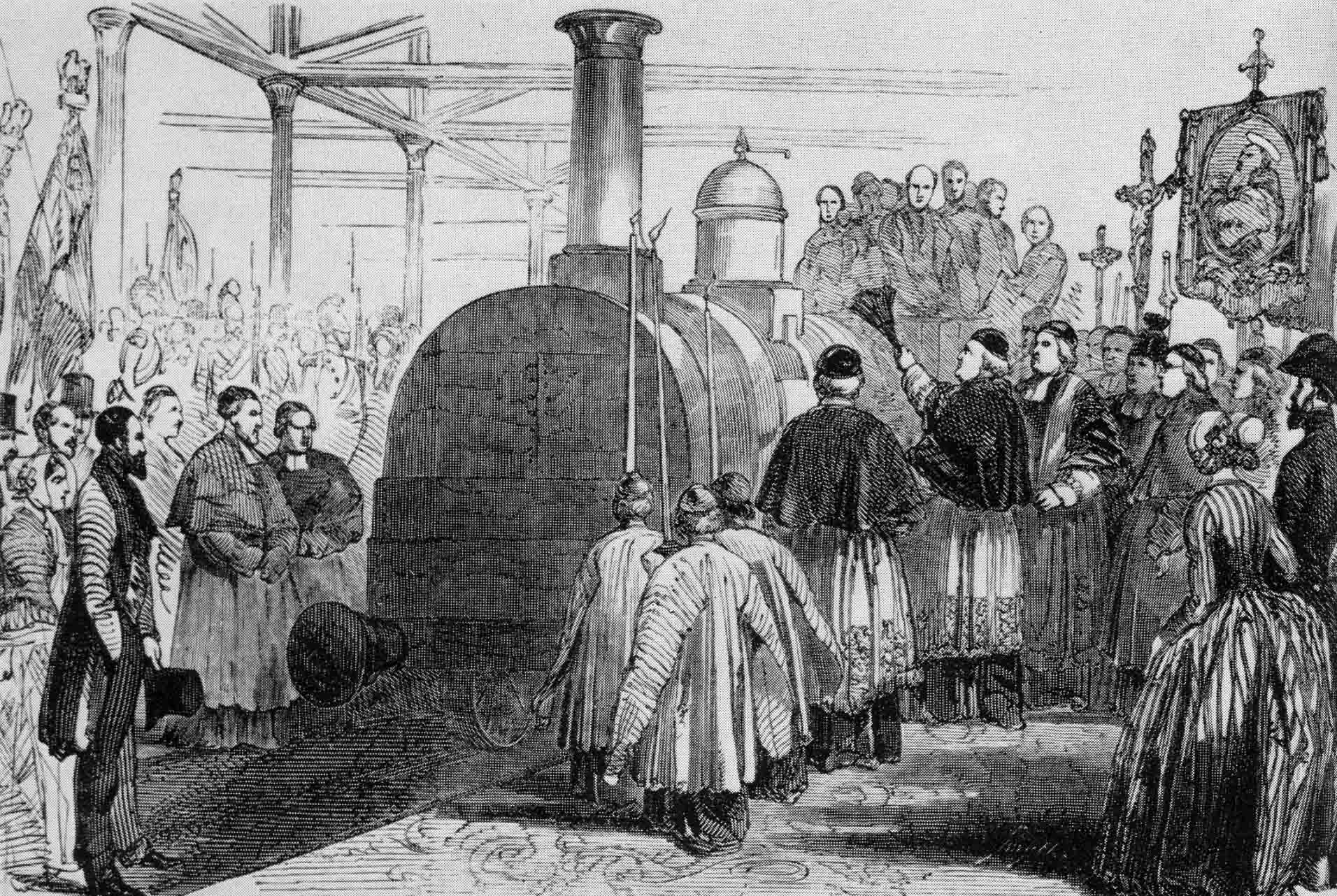
Rouen and Le Havre Railway

By 1854, with the establishment of the Second French Empire, business confidence slowly restored but Allcard withdrew from the partnership and returned to Britain. Buddicom remained in Rouen, despite the loss of investment potential in the Country. He expanded his operations, commencing with a new joint enterprise with Basile Parent (1807–1866) and Thomas Brassey (1805–1870) to connect Lyon with Geneva through a 4-kilometre tunnel, which was an extraordinary engineering achievement. In 1855, all Buddicom's French assets were nationalised but he remained in Rouen until 1860 (when Locke died). Buddicom's imminent departure prompted a surge of gratitude towards him from the people of Rouen, who sent him a community testimonial of thanks, naming a street after him.

Buddicom continued to work on new projects with partners Parent and Brassey in France, Italy, Germany and Britain until both partners died in 1870, when he wound up the company and effectively retired aged fifty-four. Having enjoyed such an intense career of vast works, Buddicom "never ceased to regret that he so early severed himself from the profession".

== Legacy ==
Buddicom was one of the great pioneers of the Industrial Revolution, best known for having designed and built locomotive engines that bore his name. Arguably, his biggest impact was restructuring the way railways managed expenditure, turning them into profitable enterprises. He met his wife in Rouen, where they were married in 1845. His wife and two young daughters were evacuated a few years later during the unrest, setting up home in Flintshire. By 1850, Buddicom was a wealthy man and was looking for a home to fit his standing in North Wales. In 1852, Buddicom purchased Penbedw Hall, which included 1,820 acres of land. Ironically, in 1861, the Mold and Denbigh Junction Railway cut across his estate, much to his annoyance, opening a station at Nannerch in 1869. At the time, Buddicom was a director of a number of companies including the Hereford, Hay and Brecon Railway close to home in Flintshire, as well as further afield with the Dublin and Meath Railway, as far away as the Central Argentine Railway. From 1862 to 1867, Buddicom was a partner with Edward Blount in a Merchant Bank based in Paris. Buddicom was a justice of the peace in Flint and served as High Sheriff of the County in 1864.

== Projects ==
YEAR	Line	Role
1831–1836	Liverpool	engineering apprentice
1836–38	Liverpool – Newton Bridge	resident engineer
1838–1840	Glasgow – Paisley	resident engineer
1840	Grand Junction Railway	locomotive superintendent
1841–1843	Le Petit-Quevilly	works manager
1844	Sotteville	chief engineer
1846–1847	Orleans – Tour	consultant engineer
1847?	Caen – Cherbourg	consultant engineer
1847?	Boulogne – Amien	consultant engineer
1847	Strasbourg	consultant engineer
1847	Dieppe	consultant engineer
1847	Paris – Lyons	consultant engineer
1848–1849	Rouen – Le Havre	operator (from Sotteville)
1849–1851	Bordeaux – La Bastide	chief engineer
1852	Bordeaux-Agouleme	consultant engineer
1854	Lyon-Geneva (Bellegarde Tunnel)	consultant engineer
1858	Dieppe (Boulante Besumi)	consultant engineer
1858	Companie de L’Ouest	consultant engineer
1859	Havre – Paris	investor for building
1860	Normandy (District)	director
1862–1870	Southern railway Italy – Maremma Railway	engineer/investor consultant
1862–1870	Rouen – Dieppe	engineer/investor rail conversion
1862–1873	Buckley Railway Co.	director
1869	Dutch – Rhenish	investor
1875	Marseilles	consultant engineer and director
1881	Blaina Iron & Tin Plate Co.	chairman and managing director
