= Forrester single (locomotive) =

Locomotive class built in 1834 of type 2-2-0 by George Forrester and Company

Swiftsure/Vauxhall type
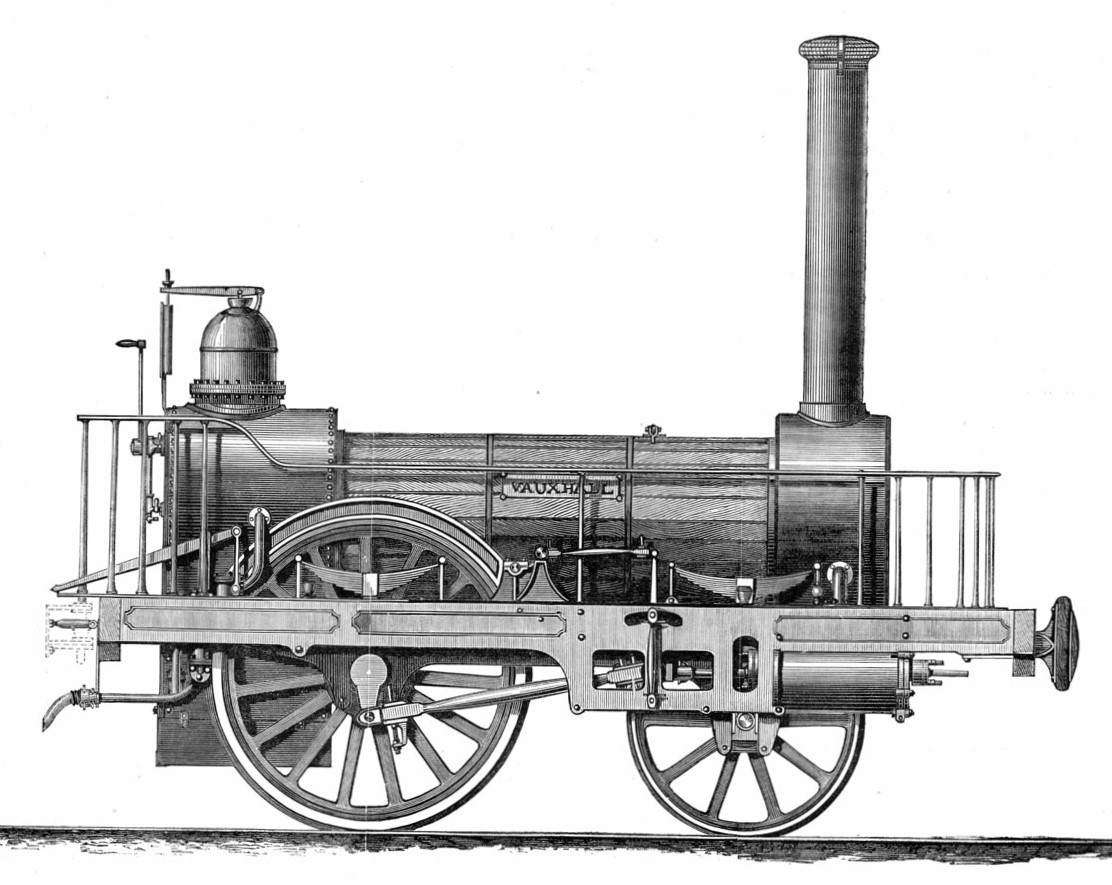
- Vauxhall (1834)
Type and origin
- Power type: Steam
- Builder: George Forrester and Company
- Build date: 1834
- Rebuilder: D&KR
Specifications
- Configuration
  - Whyte: 2-2-0
- Leading dia.: 3 ft 0 in (0.91 m)
- Driver dia.: 4 ft 8 1/2 in (1.435 m)
- Boiler pressure: 50 lbf/in^{2} (0.34 MPa)
- Cylinders: 2 (horizontal)
- Cylinder size: 11 in × 16 in (279 mm × 406 mm)
Career
- Nicknames: Boxers
- First run: 1834
- Details refer to D&KR locomotives as built.

Swiftsure was the first of eight or more similar locomotives with a single pair of driving wheels built by George Forrester and Company (Forresters) from 1834. The tank variant was the first passenger tank engine to enter service in the world.

They have been claimed to be the first locomotives to use outside horizontal cylinders (Note: Outside cylinders means the cylinders were placed outside of the wheels. It is possible some earlier engines may have had outside cylinders. Dodd's Star of 1833 and possibly one other may have a claim.) and also the first to use 4 eccentric cranks. The use of outside cylinders on a short wheelbases with no wheel balances resulted in an oscillating movement at speed, resulting in a nickname of "Boxers" and most being rebuilt from 2-2-0 to incorporate trailing axle becoming configured as 2-2-2.

Locomotives were supplied to the Liverpool and Manchester Railway (L&MR), Dublin and Kingstown (D&KR), London and Greenwich (L&GR), Birmingham and Gloucester (B&GR), and a few other minor railways.

== History ==
George Forrester's Vauxhall Foundry had been established in Liverpool by 1827, taking over a disused cotton mill. The location was about 1.5 miles (2.4 km) from the L&MR's Edge Hill Workshops and was also convenient to the docks. The L&MR had started operating in 1830, becoming the first example of successfully operating railway in the world and the model upon which the next generation of railways used as a study example for their own projects. While most L&MR locomotives in the early 1830s were supplied by Robert Stephenson and Company of Newcastle that company was unable to supply demand and other suppliers were entering the market. Forrester's had first become with the proposal to construct locomotives in response to a tender invitation by the L&MR in May 1831 but pulled out following a misunderstanding with the L&MR's secretary Henry Booth, the tender being satisfied by Bee and Liver from Edward Bury and Experiment from Robert Sharp. Forresters, along with other firms, did however perform some locomotive component construction or repair work for the L&MR in the early 1830s.

=== Origins ===
The D&KR had started their procurement for tendering for locomotives in August 1833 approaching nine firms with a requirement for six locomotives to be delivered in perfect working order by 1 May 1834; the seven who replied all commenting on the short timescale. The D&KR engaged John Urpeth Rastrick as consultant to visit the prospective builders and he returned with a specification which matched an improved Experiment locomotive from Sharp Brothers of Manchester. D&KR engineers Vignoles and Bergin has concerns over the vertical cylinders and other aspects of 'Experiment and Sharp Brothers design and the D&KR board of directors asked the locomotive manufacturers to submit their own proposals; Liverpool's Edward Bury, favoured by some of the D&KR's Quaker board, being eliminated at his stage over insistence of use of an inside-cylinder design with a crank axle which was not favoured by D&KR engineers.

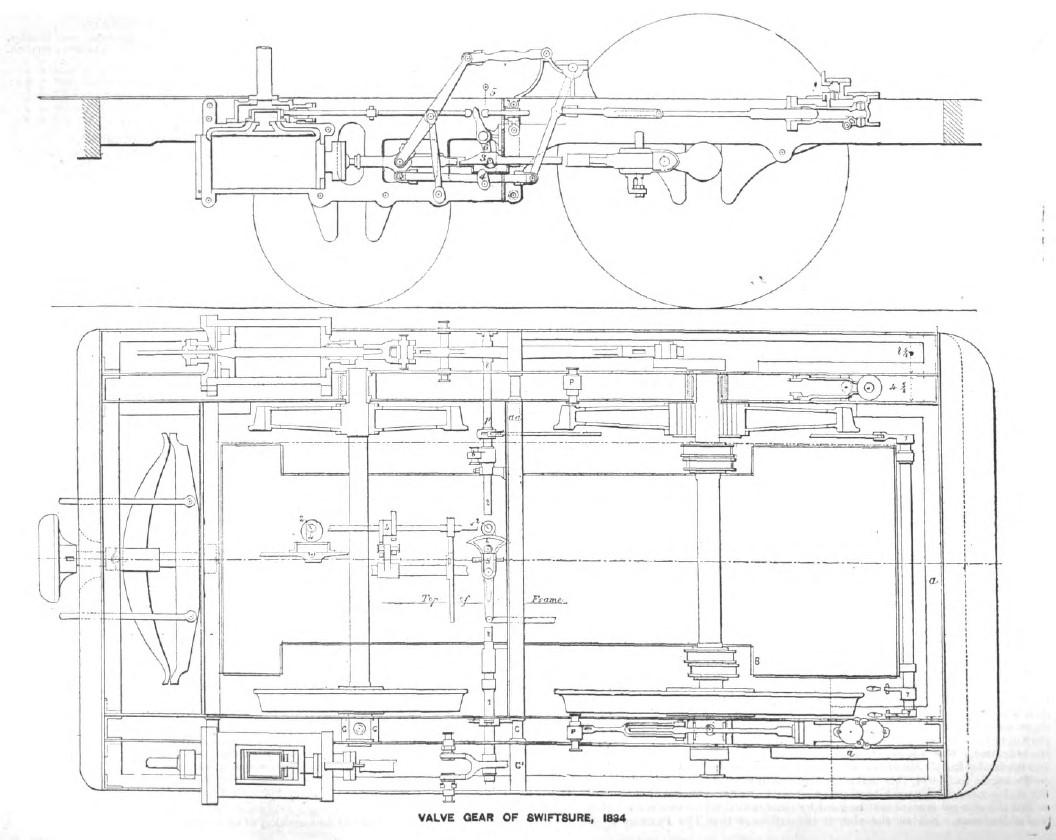
Valve Gear of Forrester's Swiftsure locomotive (built 1834)

In December 1833, with time running short to get locomotives built for their planned start of operations the D&KR board finally placed based an order for three locomotives from Sharp Brothers that were to become the Hibernia type, and three from George Forrester. They would have originally preferred to have placed all six with one manufacturer for parts commonality however ability to complete the build in the needed timescale had become a priority and degrees of uncertainty about both designs may have been a factor. Forrester had not built any locomotive prior to the D&KR order, so winning the order may seem unexpected. Forrester did have some advantages: his Liverpool base was convenient to the L&MR and their workshops, there were good communications with regular steam packet to Dublin, had previously built components for work on the L&MR, had amiable relations with the customer and a reputation for good workmanship, though that may have gained later.

The design may have evolved with the collaboration of or intention to satisfy Vignoles and Bergin. Snell claims Vignoles obtained a set of drawings from Dodds, albeit Snell also claims Dodds influence was not present until later D&KR engines. While seemingly not involved in the design the employment of Alexander Allan from Stephenson's would have been a help. It is also the case Forrester was given the Stephenson locomotive Milo by the L&MR in 1834 with a view to a repair quote; the L&MR eventually accepting Milo was uneconomic to repair leaving Forrester to scrap Milo and with the L&MR proving Swiftsure as a replacement early in 1834 — the precise dates are unclear and it was possibly too late in the year to reverse engineer any of Milo's features into the Forrester design.

D&KR officials often did spot visits to Forresters during their locomotives' construction and were generally well received by Forresters, their spot checks at Sharps sometimes indicated staff problems and absenteeism.

The company first began to produce railway locomotives in 1834. The locomotives constructed in that year were Swiftsure for the L&MR; with Vauxhall, Dublin and Kingstown for the D&KR which was to begin operations in December of that year. Swiftsure was a locomotive built by Forresters of the Vauxhall Foundry in Liverpool which entered service for the L&MR in 1834 as No. 36.

Stretton claims Swiftsure to be the first locomotive built by the company, though others have stated that this might not be the case. However information from Mr Alexander Allan (engineer at Forresters) published in 1883 pointed to an error in a publication in The Engineer in 1881 where the Swiftsure was listed at built in 1835. He pointed out that Swiftsure was the first locomotive, being built 'early in 1834', and he attended it on trials, etc; he also went to Dublin late in 1834 with the three locomotives for the Dublin and Kingstown Railway ('of the same size and design as the Swiftsure'), and was responsible for their care while under the Forrester's maintenance contract. The confusion may have arisen because Swiftsure worked from the Liverpool end of the L&MR in 1834, before being transferred to the Manchester end of the line in 1835. Swiftsure had a pair of trailing wheels added in 1836, and was in regular service until 1842.

=== Design ===
The type were the first locomotives to use outside cylinders and also the first outside and inside frames, though the later was not appreciated at the time and only adopted some ten years later. The combination of outside frames on a short 2-2-0 wheelbase with unbalanced driving wheels led to an oscillating motion and led to the nickname of "Boxers". Many locomotives eventually were fitted with a trailing axle to become a 2-2-2T to help reduce the problem.

=== Liverpool and Manchester ===
Swiftsure entered service on the L&MR as a 2-2-0 in October 1834 with two outside 11 in × 18 in (279 mm × 457 mm) cylinders, (Note: The date seems surprisingly late in the year if (Thomas 1980, pp. 162–163) is correct.) for a price of £860. (Note: Dawson states the L&MR ordered Swiftsure in November 1834 for £860 as a replacement for Milo. and was delivered in spring 1834, with a Forrester D&KR engine running trials earlier in July 1834 on the L&MR.) It was noted as being involved in a collision with at Parkside on 11 November 1934 with the consequence that a labourer was crushed between wagons of the stationary between the wagons of the stationary luggage train. (Note: Freight or goods trains were termed luggage trains in this period.) The labourer was later to die of his injuries and the "occasional engineman" charge of Swiftsure was held responsible for entering a watering stop at more than 6 miles per hour (9.7 km/h) and was sanctioned by losing his turn on the promotion list. Swiftsure was involved in a further incident in July 1835 whilst descending the incline at Whiston, Merseyside when a train of five silk wagons caught fire; the train took several hundred yards to stop and some wagons were only detached with difficulty. The L&MR was ultimately advised to pay £3,000 damages for the high value load on the basis they had not adequately displayed notices that the owners should have insured it.

Swiftsure was involved in several experiments during its service life. In November 1836 the L&MR performed a coal burning trial involving Swiftsure and several other locomotives, the results being generally unsuccessful with Swiftsure's firebox damaged by excessive heat. Locomotives at this period were forced to use the more expensive and sometimes problematic coke in order to fulfill the requirement to "consume their own smoke"; it took several years for the technology to use coal successfully in locomotives to evolve.

=== Dublin and Kingstown ===
The Forresters' locomotives for the D&KR became known as Vauxhall, Dublin and Kingstown; the names being those of the manufacturing foundry and the termini of the line.

The first of the D&KR locomotives (Note: It would probably be reasonably assumed this was Vauxhall but it is not named as such in the source.) ran sufficiently well on tests on the L&MR that it was permitted by their superintendent Manchester to take charge of the first class train to Liverpool on 27 June 1834. The journey was completed in 1 hour 17 minutes with several D&KR people on board including James Pim, Thomas Flemming Bergin, Vignoles and other directors.

Vauxhall along with Hibernia were transported to Dublin on the same sailing before being hauled through the streets on temporary tracks. Murray says there is a legend Vauxhall was the first locomotive to reach the D&KR's tracks, making it Ireland's first steam locomotive.

The first recorded service of the invited members of the public being transported was a special preview trip to Martello Tower and Booterstown by Vauxhall on 4 October 1834. The honour of the first trial run over the entire length of the line fell to Forresters Hibernia on 9 October 1834 with Vauxhall doing a trip later in the day.

The honour of the first scheduled train in Ireland fell to Sharp's locomotive Hibernia at 09:00 17 December 1834; this being the famously celebrated inaugural run. While Forrester's Vauxhall ran the next service and both continued running trips throughout the day. The D&KR commenced its full scheduled service in January 1835.

Maintenance of the class was at the Serpentine Road "engine hospital" with one section reserved for Forrester locomotives with their man Alexander Allan on site for one year per the purchase contract.

The D&KR began requesting quotes for two more engines in February 1835; Vignoles' earlier suggestion eight locomotives would be required proving more accurate in practice than consultant Rastrick's suggest only four would be necessary. On 28 March 1835 the motive power situation became desperate when Forrester locomotive's Vauxhall and Dublin were in collision, with requests to England for spare tenders. Murray claims the D&KR had begun to consider tank engines carry their own coke and water had begun to be considered from February due to the operational inconvenience of having to separate the locomotive and tender so each could be turned independently on the D&KR's 10 feet (3.0 m) turntables, the latter at least being manually pushed. The order for two 2-2-0T locomotives's was put in Forrester's, in the event these were named Comet and Victoria, with Murray claiming these were "the first tank engines to work on any public railway".

All five Forrester D&KR singles were converted to six wheel tank engines by 1841, the conversion being relatively simple with the fitting of water tanks under the boiler and extending the footplate to incorporate a coke stage and the addition of a trailing axle.

=== London and Greenwich ===
The London and Greenwich Railway began a public service on the 2 1/2 miles (4.0 km) section between Spa Road and Deptford in February 1836. Locomotives in use at this point were two Planet type of the 2-2-0 configuration. Royal William was supplied by William Marshall & Sons. (Note: (Thomas 1986) locates Marshall & Sons at Tipton while (Lowe 2014, pp. 458–459) indicates Gravesend.) Lowe also finds alternative sources indicating No. 1 was supplied by Charles Tayleur and Company which had links to Stephenson and this was as a set of parts and assembled on site. That source also indicates Marshalls were previously Braithwaites until 1839, (Whishaw 1842) and Venus supplied by the L&MR possibly as a hire to replace an unusual 0-2-0 rotary steam engine supplied by Earl Dundonald. Victoria from Forresters became the third operational engine in May 1836 for the sum of £1,010 10s 0d. The L&GR had initially ordered locomotives from Stephenson's and Burys however neither actually supplied. (Note: (Lowe 2014, pp. 458–459) says Bury subcontracted to Forrester (both factories were in the Liverpool docks area) while Stephenson had links to Charles Tayleur.)

Forrester's second engine Walter (Note: Forrester's had named the locomotive William but the L&GR renamed it Walter to avoid a clash, presumably after their director George Walter.) arrived in December 1836 in time for the extension to London Bridge station, becoming the sixth operational engine, Royal William having acquired three sister locomotives in the interim. Victoria and Walter with their 2-2-0WT configuration and acquired the nickname "Boxers" for the typical yawing motion of type. Trials in 1837 revealed that Walter was more powerful than Royal William. Both were converted to tender locomotives, possibly in an effort to reduce the yawing. They were painted green, acquiring the numbers five and six respectively and possibly losing their names from the 1840s.

Victoria had a trailing axle added in 1841 to become a 2-2-0, before becoming a pumping engine at Bricklayers Arms from December 1845 and was finally acquired by C. Tomkins at Reading for scrap for £110. Walter was never fitted with a trailing axle. It saw service at Redhill repair shops from January 1846 followed by an assignment to the Gomshall sandpits from 1853 until it was scrapped along with Victoria.

=== Birmingham and Gloucester ===
The Birmingham and Gloucester Railway possessed four Forrester 2-2-2s: the Cheltenham, the Worcester, the Bromsgrove and the Tewkesbury. They had been ordered by Edward Bury soon after his appointment as locomotive advisor and agent and two arrived in November 1838 and were used on construction. They proved more reliable than the American Norris engines and were allocated to the important mail services. With their 2-2-2 wheel arrangement they were totally unsuited and never intended for climbing the steep Lickey Incline and for this ascent they were assisted by the Norris Type A Extra bank engines.

=== Other railways ===
Parliamentary papers published in 1842 seem to yield examples of other railways using 2-2-0 and 2-2-2 Forrester engines. The Preston and Wyre Railway (P&WR) had a Forrester 2-2-0 it sued for light goods, ballasting work, and occasional special passenger trains. Its other engine was a 2-2-2 goods and its passenger services were generally worked by another railway. The P&WR was aware their six-wheeled locomotive seemed to cause far less track wear than several other four wheel locomotives used on the railway, but that there 4 wheel Forrester could negotiate some curves the six wheel could not. (Note: The P&WR included docks where sharp curves might be found.) The Grand Junction Railway had between one and three Forrester engines 2-2-2 engines based on the information they had three locomotives with outside cylinders with one different from the other two. The Manchester, Bolton & Bury Canal Navigation and Railway (MB&CNR) had two Forrester 2-2-0s and eight 0-4-0s from Edward Bury and William Fairbairn with a preference to go for Bury's engine if more were needed.

== Legacy ==
The class was to form the basis for later locomotives built by the D&KR for itself starting with the Princess in 1939. The locomotives Alexander Allan went on design for the Grand Junction Railway and London and North Western Railway (including the Crewe type (locomotive)) showed influences from Forrester practice.
