= Rainbow (1837 ship) =

1837 paddle-wheel steamer

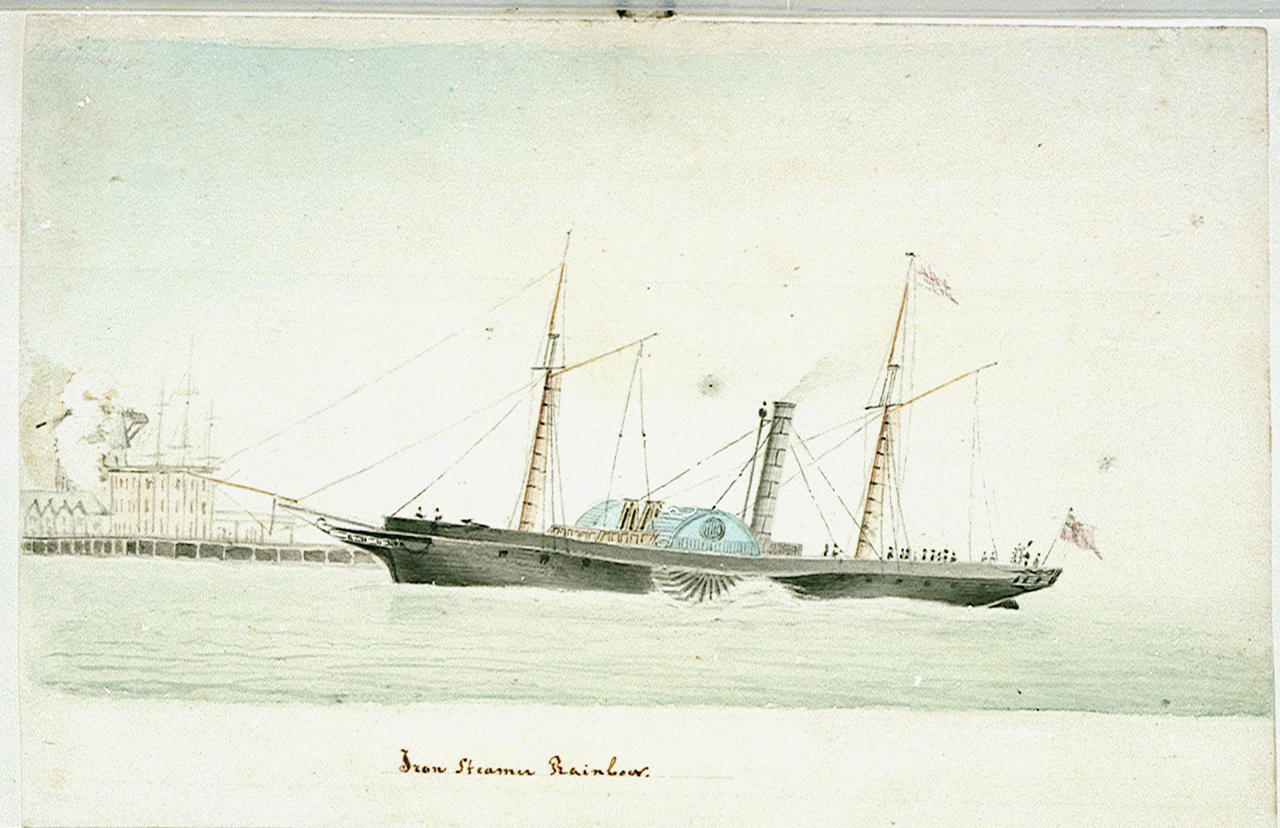
- Rainbow, 1840 watercolour by Van Treslong Prins from the collections of the Royal Museums Greenwich

History
- Name: Rainbow
- Owner: General Steam Navigation Company
- Builder: John Laird
- Completed: 1837
- Out of service: 1869
- Fate: Scrapped 1869

General characteristics
- Type: iron paddle steamer
- Tonnage: 582
- Length: 190 ft (57.91 m)
- Beam: 25 ft (7.62 m)
- Depth: 12.8 ft (3.90 m) depth of hold
- Installed power: 2 90 HP engines built by George Forrester and Company
- Propulsion: 2 paddle wheels (diameter 21.6 ft (6.58 m)

The Rainbow was an iron paddle-wheel steamer for passengers and cargo, built in 1837 by John Laird in Birkenhead, England for the General Steam Navigation Company. The engines were produced by George Forrester and Company from Liverpool. It was said to be the largest iron steamer of its day, and the fastest. It covered 190 nautical miles in 14 hours during a passage to Antwerp. The ship has been described as "a landmark in naval architecture" and had "influence on Brunel", who traveled to Antwerp on the Rainbow. It is seen as a "precursor of the ocean-going iron steamer".

The ship was intended to travel between London and Ramsgate, but also made voyages between London and Antwerp. Later she was used for the cargo trade between London and Le Havre. She was scrapped in 1869.

Sir George Biddell Airy, the Astronomer Royal, conducted experiments on board the ship about the influence of an iron hull on the workings of the compass.

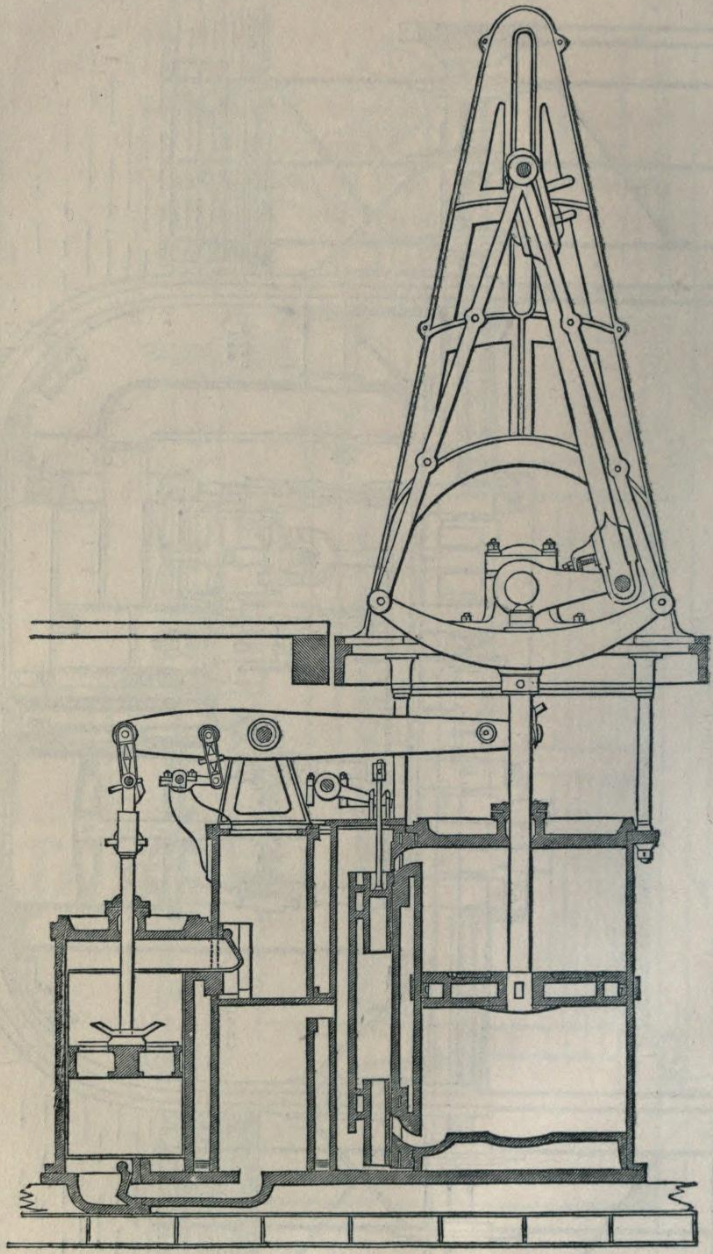
Forrester steeple type engine used in Rainbow
