= Joseph Farcot =

French engineer and industrialist

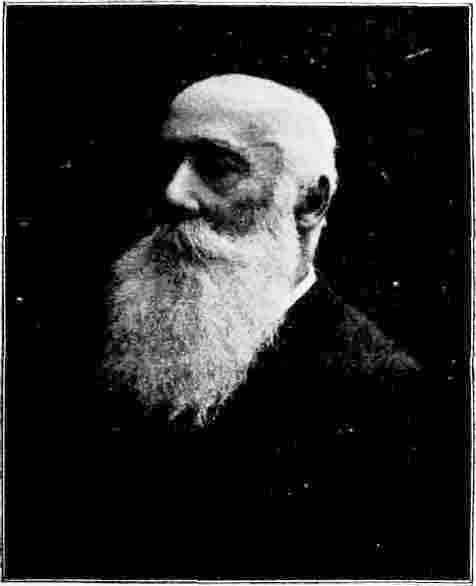
- Born: Jean Joseph Léon Farcot; 23 June 1824; Paris, France
- Died: 19 March 1908 (aged 83); Saint-Ouen, Seine-Saint-Denis, France
- Occupation: Engineer
- Known for: Servomechanisms

Jean Joseph Léon Farcot (English: /fɑːrˈkoʊ/ far-KOH, French: [ʒɑ̃ ʒozɛf leɔ̃ faʁko]; 23 June 1824 – 19 March 1908) was a French engineer and industrialist whose factories employed up to 700 workers. He was also a prolific inventor. He was one of the pioneers of the servomechanism, where a feedback loop helps control a machine. The invention lets one helmsman control a ship's rudder weighing several tons.

== Life ==
Jean Joseph Léon Farcot was born in Paris on 23 June 1824. He was the son of the engineer Marie-Joseph Farcot (1798–1875). His grandfather was the learned economist and philanthropist Joseph Jean Chrysostome Farcot (1744–1815). At first he was interested in history, but then decided to join the family business. He obtained a diploma in 1845 from the Central School of Arts and Manufactures in Paris. He then joined the family firm.

In 1846 Marie-Joseph Farcot transferred his factory close to the docks and railway station in Saint-Ouen on the Seine. Through successive purchases of land the works grew to almost 4 hectares (9.9 acres). The main output of the factory was steam engines, but it also produced boilers, pumps and electrical machines. Joseph Farcot help build the workshops in Saint-Ouen. In 1848 he became head of the research section of the Maison Farcot. The factory employed 145 workers in 1849, and 500–700 between 1872 and 1902.

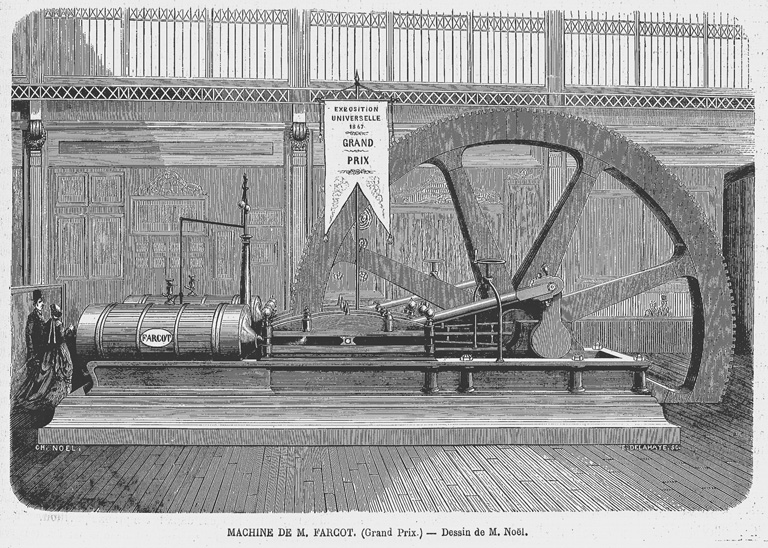
The Farcot horizontal steam engine at the 1867 Exhibition

In 1867 the Maison Farcot received the Grand Prix pour mérite hors ligne at the International Exposition of 1867 in Paris. Almost all the machines they exhibited were designed by Joseph Farcot. They exhibited two coupled horizontal steam engines at the exhibition each of which delivered 80 horsepower. They won a gold medal for their horizontal steam engines in the class of motors, generators and mechanical devices. The report of the jury noted that the Farcots had installed two 100 horsepower Woolf pumps which took water from the Seine at the quai d'Austerlitz in Paris and delivered it along a line of 5 to 6 kilometres (3.1 to 3.7 mi) to the reservoirs at Ménilmontant, 50 to 60 metres (160 to 200 ft) higher up.

Joseph Farcot was made a knight of the Legion of Honour in 1867, and officer in 1878. In 1879 he became president of the Society of Civil Engineers of France. Joseph Farcot died in Saint-Ouen, Seine-Saint-Denis, on 19 March 1908. He was aged eighty three. After his death the factory in Saint-Ouen ran into difficulties. It was sold in 1915, and in 1924 was acquired by André Citroën.

== Inventions ==
Joseph Farcot obtained patents for aspects of steam engines, controllers, pumps, generators, cranes and thermal engines. He filed 41 patent applications in 1854–63, 88 from 1864–73 and 64 from 1884–98.

=== Governors ===
In November 1788 James Watt produced a design for a "fly ball" governor, titled "Centrifugal speed regulator", a device for automatically controlling the speed of a steam engine so that it would run at the same rate despite changes in the heat of the fire. This was crucial in cotton spinning. The governor was simple and adequate for many uses, and for many years remained the most common form of governor. However it was prone to hunting from one speed to another and had low power. Engineers designed various types of hydraulic or pneumatic pump regulator to overcome the limitations of Watt's governor.

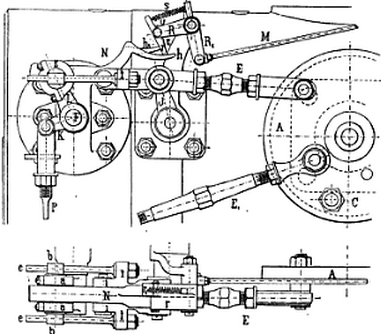
Automatic variable expansion-gear attachment to a Corliss engine (1878)

Marie-Joseph Farcot designed a governor in 1854, and he and Joseph designed several others after this, including the crossed-arm governor, which achieved close to isochronous operation, although it was prone to instability. The Farcots refined the design with friction brakes, and in 1864 added an air dashpot. They obtained a patent for a spring-loaded governor in 1864. Farcot's automatic variable expansion-gear, an attachment to a Corliss steam engine, was exhibited at the Exposition Universelle of 1878 in Paris. The mechanism supported a wide range of automatic cut-offs between 0 and 80% of the stroke, with a relatively simple and elegant design.

=== Servomechanisms ===
Joseph Farcot may deserve as much credit as John McFarlane Gray for inventing steering engines that use feedback. With his servo-motor design of 1859 Joseph Farcot implemented the feedback principle. This allowed a giant battleship with a rudder weighing several tons to be steered using a single wheel. The mechanism used the position of the rudder to direct the right amount of steam to a piston that controlled the rudder. This was the basis for the theoretical discipline of cybernetics.

Farcot was given a British patent for a steering engine in 1868. In 1873 he published a book Le servo-moteur ou moteur asservi that described the different steam steering devices that Farcot and Son had developed. Farcot noted that with the steering engine of the Bélier coastal defense ship, a force of 3 to 4 kilograms (6.6 to 8.8 lb) by the helmsman could operate a rudder with loads of 10,000 to 20,000 kilograms (22,000 to 44,000 lb).

== Sources ==
- Bennett, Stuart (1986-01-01). A History of Control Engineering, 1800–1930. IET. ISBN 978-0-86341-047-5.
- Chevalier, Michel (1868). Rapports du jury international de l'Exposition universelle de 1867. imp. Paul Dupont.
- "Classe 52". L'exposition universelle de 1867, illustrée. E. Dentu. 1867.
- "FARCOT, Joseph (1823–1908)". DMG. DFG.
- Farcot, Joseph (1873). Le servo-moteur: cu, Meteur-asservi, ses principes constitutifs- variantes diverses application à la manoeuvre des gouvernails. Gouvernails à vapeur Farcot, description théorique et pratique. J. Baudry.
- Glaire, Jean Baptiste; Walsh, vicomte Joseph-Alexis; Chantrel, Joseph (1846). "Farcot (Joseph-Jean-Chrysostome)". Encyclopédie catholique, répertoire universel et raisonné des sciences, des lettres, des arts et des métiers, formant une bibliothèque universelle, avec la biographie des hommes célèbres: ornée de plus de 3000 gravures dans le texte et refermant le résumé de plus de dix mille ouvrages. P. Desbarres.
- Katz, Cécile (2003). Territoire d'usines: Seine-Saint-Denis. creaphis editions. ISBN 978-2-913610-30-9.
- Nansouty, Max Charles Emmanuel Champion de; Talansier, Charles; Dumas, Albin; Dumas, Jacques (1908). "Joseph Farcot". Le Génie civil (PDF). Éditions du Génie Civil et de la Métallurgie Tour Palerme.
- Tresca (1876). "Marie-Joseph Farcot". Bulletin de la Société d'encouragement pour l'industrie nationale.
- Uhland, Wilhelm Heinrich (1879). Corliss-engines and Allied Steam-motors Working with and Without Automatic Variable Expansion-gear: Including the Most Approved Designs of All Countries, with Special Reference to the Steam-engines of the Paris International Exhibition of 1878-- a Treatise on the Development, Progress and Constructive Principles of These Engines. E. & F. N. Spon.
