= William Fernihough =

English locomotive engineer

- Engineering career
- Discipline: Railway engineering
- Employers: George Forrester and Company; Edward Bury; Eastern Counties Railway; South Eastern Railway
- Significant advance: Counterbalanced driving wheel (Note: The counterbalanced railway wheel may have been adopted by others first and perhaps more rapidly outside the UK, (Bardell 1988) does some comprehensive discussion of at least some of the history.)

William Fernihough was locomotive superintendent of the Eastern Counties Railway (ECR) from 1843 to 1845. He is noted for his work on the balancing of railway engines in particular the counterbalanced driving wheel

== Biography ==
The simple expedient of putting iron as balancing weights under on the driving wheels was due to William Fernihough of the Eastern counties Railway, who really ought to have patented the idea; it would have made him a multi-millionaire before there were any

— Summers, L. A.

Fernihough served his apprenticeship at George Forrester and Company at Vauxhall, Liverpool. He was present at the firm during the period when the company built locomotives for the Dublin and Kingstown Railway. Nock specifically terms these locomotives "notorious outside cylindered 2-2-0's", the combination of outside cylinders wide apart at the front, unbalanced wheels and short wheelbase contributing to a oscillating motion and a nickname of "Boxers". While the issues were contained by a combination of the D&KR adding trailing wheels, using a stronger trackbed and limiting excessive speed Fernihough would have been aware of the issues.

Subsequently he was employed at Edward Bury's who had a nearby workshop in Liverpool. Bury had a significant contract to supply the London and Birmingham Railway at this time, but Fernihough is noted as working in the Liverpool workshops. Bury's locomotives had inside-cylinders and would have been less susceptible to oscillations, though the crank-axle could be a weakspot.

Fernihough was appointed locomotive superintendent following the departure of resident engineer John Braithwaite in February 1843. A key task Fernihough faced in 1844 was the re-gauging of the ECR locomotives and rolling stock from 5 ft (1,524 mm) to 4 ft 8 1/2 in (1,435 mm).

It was during his spell at the ECR, that Fernihough became famed for adding counterbalanced weights to the rims of locomotive wheels to improve stability as speed. Others had added weights to wheels before him, there are even claims of his predecessor Braithwaite doing so at the ECR, however as evidenced later by his report to the Gauge Commission he appeared to be doing this in a structured manner and the success of evidenced in the performance of ECR locomotives even after he left. (Note: (Bardell 1988, pp. 83–96) gives an extensive analysis to the first use of rim balancing weights on locomotive wheels and suggests John Urpeth Rastrick may have had a case first use, though his understanding of the underlying problem may have been deficient and his influence in the adoption of wheel balancing negligible.)

From his the report of an accident on the ECR on 4 August 1845 at Littlebury Fernihough had been riding on an engine that had become derailed with the guard being fatally injured in the accident. Fernihough seems to have resigned at this time, in any event he was replaced by Thomas Scott on 28 October 1845.

On 27 October 1845, Fernihough appeared before the Gauge Commission and by the analysis of Bardell's thesis gave the first published account of the mathematics and mechanics of the wheel balancing problem. Nock, in 1957, described Fernihough's method of balancing the reciprocating parts of an engine by adding weights in the driving wheels" as "now universal — not theoretically perfect, but a judicious compromise between the mathematically exact and the practical minimum.

In 1848, Fernihough was tasked by the South Eastern Railway (SER) to build a locomotive / directors' inspection carriage combination at the works at Bricklayers Arms. Progress was slow, and after 21 months the locomotive superintendent James Cudworth resorted to sending the vehicle to Ashford works to be completed where it emerged as No. 126 Coffee Pot.

In 1850, Fernihough raised a patent (No. 1328) for a mixed steam and gas turbine unit, on which it was commented in 1945, "has merit today".

=== Legacy ===
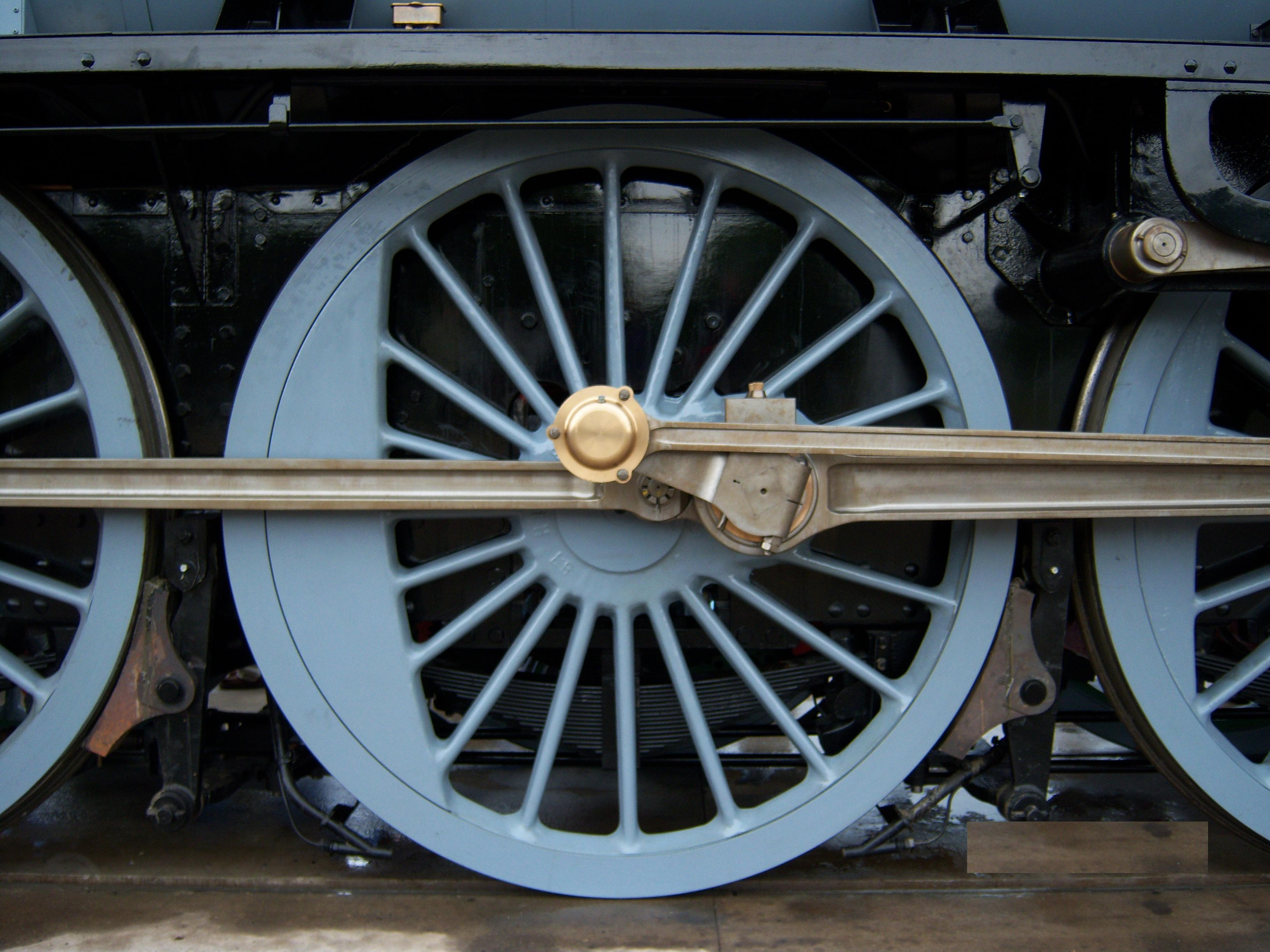
Driving wheel on the modern 100mph Tornado where the counterbalance weight is clearly seen on the inside left of the wheel rim and is essential to avoid wheel oscillations at speed

Apart from the subsequent take up of the use of counterbalanced wheels in the UK and elsewhere, the ECR seems to have benefited from Fernihough's work in being able to run locomotives for longer and faster than was possible on other UK railways. In particular Stephenson's long-boiler types were particularly subject to swaying and instability at speed; however, with Fernihough's counterbalanced wheels, the ECR seemed able to operate them at acceptable passenger speeds and retain them operationally for longer than other UK railways.
