= John McFarlane Gray =

Scottish engineer (1831–1908)

- Born: 7 April 1831; Kincardine, Scotland
- Died: 14 January 1908 (aged 76); Edinburgh, Scotland
- Occupation: Engineer
- Known for: Steam steering mechanism

John McFarlane Gray (7 April 1831 – 14 January 1908), also known as J. Macfarlane Gray, was a Scottish engineer who invented a portable steam riveting machine and a steam steering mechanism for Isambard Kingdom Brunel's famous SS Great Eastern.

== Early years ==
John Macfarlane Gray was born on 7 April 1831 in Kincardine, Scotland. His father was a draper. McFarlane Gray had no interest in following his father's trade. He left home and moved to Edinburgh where he worked as an apprentice while studying the Hebrew and Greek languages, mathematics and mechanics. He then moved to Paisley where he worked for Mr. Blackwood, later a partner in Blackwood and Gordon. He next obtained a position with McNab's marine engineering works in Greenock. Here he worked as an engineer, and was rapidly promoted. Gray returned to Blackwood and Gordon's, which had now moved to Port Glasgow. His employers recommended him for a position as chief draftsman and manager at the George Forrester and Company engineering works in Liverpool.

About 1855 McFarlane Gray saw a large gyroscope being exhibited by Sir William Armstrong at the Newcastle Philosophical Institution, and spent some time working out exactly how it worked. He later explained the engineering principles to the officers of the Board of Trade. According to The Nautical Magazine, "so far as we are aware, the first example of direct calculation of gyroscopic effect as an engineering quality is due to Mr. McFarlane Gray, and made in relation to strains resulting from rolling and pitching on the shafts of fly-wheels attached to marine engines.

== Later career ==
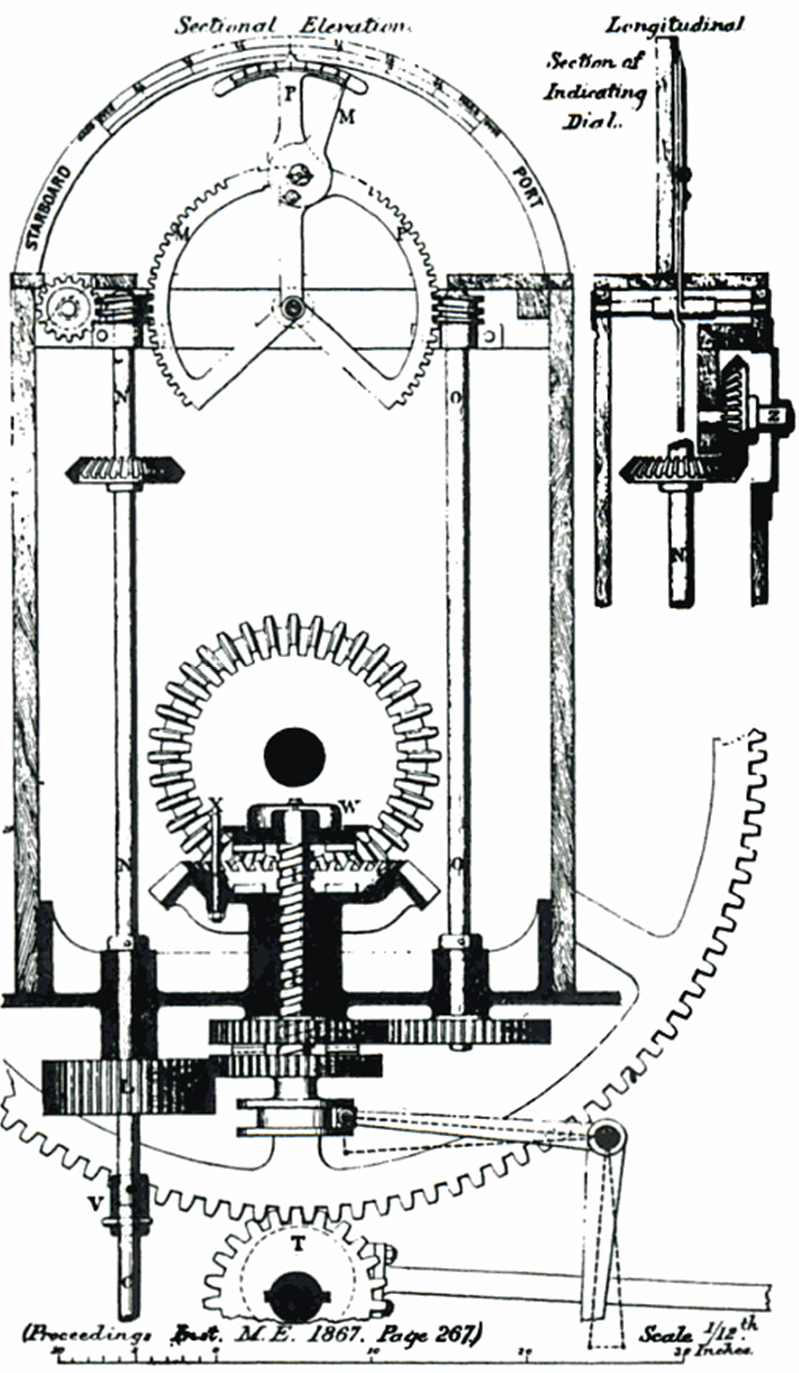
McFarlane Gray's steam steering engine from the Proceedings of the Institution of Mechanical Engineers 1868

Gray designed marine engines and various types of machinery at George Forrester's. In 1866 he patented a steam steering engine that incorporated feedback. It was first used in the SS Great Eastern, the largest and most advanced ship of the day. This brought him acclaim in the engineering world. At that time as many as a hundred men might be needed to work the steering gear in an armoured cruiser moving at full speed. Gray was asked to look into using steam power for the steering gears. The invention was first tried in March 1867. The trial was successful and the steam steering gear was generally adopted. Gray said of the steering device much later,

The principal thing that I did was to make an automatic controlling valve, continuous in its action. To put a handle to where you wanted something to move had been done before, but I saw that it would not do for steering. I therefore contrived the differential movement of the reversing vale, but [by?] which the rudder or other object to be moved would be made to follow the movement of the controlling wheel or lever.

In Gray's invention the angle of the rudder is transmitted to a differential screw, which in turn controls a steam valve that supplies power to a motor that turns the rudder. As the rudder approaches the desired angle indicated by the helm the steam valve is adjusted to reduce power. If it moves away from that angle the valve opens to increase power and return the rudder to its position. Gray had invented a servomechanism, a name coined by the French engineer Joseph Farcot. Farcot must be given equal credit for the concept, which he had developed independently.

Gray became a member of the Institution of Mechanical Engineers in 1865. He also became a member of the Royal Institution of Naval Architects. He was a Vice-President of the Institute of Marine Engineers from its foundation in 1889. McFarlane Gray wanted engineers to act according to the importance of their position. He said, "If engineers will aim at so conducting themselves that they are never spoken of otherwise as being 'quite equal if not superior to the deck officers in their language and behaviour', and if that pertains to their highly intellectual calling that makes themselves masters both of theory and the practice, the time would not be very distant when their importance in steamers would be fully recognized."

Gray was employed by the Board of Trade in Liverpool, then in Cork and finally in London, where he was appointed chief examiner of marine engineers. In this position his influence was limited since Board of Trade policy did not allow publication of the individual opinions of their engineering officers, but he was able to present some theoretical papers at meetings of engineers. Macfarlane Gray was instrumental in introducing the use of entropy-temperature diagrams, described by Professor Josiah Willard Gibbs, for solving steam engine problems. He retired in 1906 and settled in Edinburgh. He died 14 January 1908 aged 76.

== Publications ==
Around 1885 McFarlane Gray wrote a report about the second law of thermo-dynamics that caused some controversy. The Council of the Royal Society declined to allow him to read the report before the Society. The society first asked for more information about his investigations. However, he read papers on the subject before the Physical Society and the Institution of Naval Architects, and planned to publish a book giving the results of his researches into thermodynamics. Gray presented papers on theoretical subjects related to steam power that included:

- 1885 The Theoretical Duty of Heat in the Steam-Engine Results of an investigation on the Theta-Phi diagram, read before the Institution of Naval Architects
- 1889 The Ether-Pressure Theory of Thermodynamics applied to Steam, also read before the Institution of Naval Architects
- 1889 The Rationalization of Regnault's Experiments on Steam, Paris. Explained the use of steam and water lines of the temperature-entropy diagram.
- 1900 Analysis of the experiments of Grindley on the cooling of saturated steam by free expansion, read before the Royal Society in January 1900
- 1901 Variable and Absolute Specific Heats of Water, paper given to the Institution of Civil Engineers. Gray was given a Telford Medal for this paper, although he was not a member.

Books included:

- Gray, J. MacFarlane (1864). Arithmetic of Building Societies: what they profess to be; what they are; what they ought to be; with extensive tables and illustrations of well known societies.
- Gray, J. MacFarlane (1887). The Ether-pressure Theory of Thermodynamics Applied to Steam. Institution of Naval Architects.
- Gray, J. MacFarlane (1891). Rationnalisation Des Experiences de Regnault Sur la Vapeur ... Traduction Communiquée Par L'auteur Et Complétée Par M.G. Richard.
- Gray, J. MacFarlane (1893). Examination of Engineers. Memorandum on Examinations. [By J.M. Gray. With a Plate.]. London: Great Britain. Naval Department.

== Sources ==
- Bennett, Stuart (1 January 1986). A History of Control Engineering, 1800–1930. IET. ISBN 978-0-86341-047-5.
- Davison, Dr Robert L (28 July 2013). The Challenges of Command: The Royal Navy's Executive Branch Officers, 1880–1919. Ashgate Publishing, Ltd. ISBN 978-1-4094-8241-3.
- Ewing, J. Alfred (20 June 2013). The Steam-Engine and Other Heat-Engines. Cambridge University Press. ISBN 978-1-107-61563-2.
- "Memoirs: John MacFarlane Gray". Institution of Mechanical Engineers. February 1908.
- NE Coast Institution of Engineers and Shipbuilders (1885). Transactions – North East Coast Institution of Engineers and Shipbuilders. North East Institutiton of Engineers and Shipbuilders, Newcastle-upon-Tyne.
- The Nautical Magazine (1875). "The Bessemer Saloon "Gyroscopic" Apparatus". Van Nostrand's Eclectic Engineering Magazine. D. Van Nostrand.
