= Edge Hill railway works =

Railway company in Liverpool

Coordinates: 53.406°N 2.952°W

Edge Hill railway works was built by the Liverpool and Manchester Railway around 1830 at Edge Hill, Liverpool. A second was built in 1839 by the Grand Junction Railway adjacent to it.

== Liverpool and Manchester Railway ==
The shop initially maintained and repaired the company's existing fleet of thirty six engines, bought in from private makers, twenty seven from Robert Stephenson and Company.

The first locomotive superintendent was John Dixon, followed by John Melling, then in 1840 by John Dewrance. In 1841 four 2-2-2 were built, followed by six more the following year, which also saw the production of 2-4-0 goods engines.

By 1845 some twenty eight engines were built, at which time the L&MR was merged into the Grand Junction, and new building ceased, with the workshop closing in 1847.

== Grand Junction Railway ==
Opening in 1839, the first Locomotive Superintendent was Thomas Melling. He was succeeded in 1840 by William Buddicom.

An immediate problem was the frequency of broken crank axles on the inside-cylindered 2-2-2 locomotives from a range of manufacturers. The works produced a new design, either by Buddicom, or his foreman, Alexander Allan, with outside cylinders. The first three were probably rebuilds, "Aeolus", "Tartarus" and "Sunbeam". They became known as the "Old Crewe" type.

In 1841, Francis Trevithick, son of Richard Trevithick took over as Locomotive Superintendent. The space at Edge Hill limited further expansion. Moreover, the GJR could only enter it over L&MR tracks. Accordingly, in 1843, the GJR decided to move its operations to Crewe, which was roughly halfway along the route. Shortly after this the works closed down, along with Longsight.

== See also ==
- Edge Hill railway station
