= Guyonneau de Pambour =

French engineer (1795–1878)

Count François Marie Guyonneau de Pambour (1795 – 19 February 1878) was a French nobleman and Army engineer who was among the first to examine theoretical aspects of steam engines.

Count de Pambour was born in Noyon and joined the army after training at the École Polytechnique (1813–1815). He is best known for his Théorie de la machine à vapeur (1839) and Traité théorique et pratique des machines locomotives (1835) which were translated widely. Although an engineer, his work was more theoretical with examination of the mathematical and physical bases. He was never elected to the French Academy of Sciences (despite being proposed thrice), possibly due to differences with Jean-Victor Poncelet and Arthur Jules Morin who had used a coefficient of friction while De Pambour used a term that covered operating conditions. De Pambour clashed with Poncelet and he was not included in biographies published in the centenary of the École Polytechnique. De Pambour's work was improved by others including Émile Clapeyron and made obsolete after the development of the Clausius-Rankine cycle.
