= Marie-Joseph Farcot =

French engineer, inventor and manufacturer

- Born: Marie-Joseph-Denis Farcot; 1798
- Died: 1875 (aged 76–77)
- Occupation: Engineer
- Known for: Steam engine inventions

Marie-Joseph-Denis Farcot (English: /fɑːrˈkoʊ/ far-KOH, French: [maʁi ʒozɛf dəni faʁko]; 1798–1875) was a French engineer, inventor and manufacturer, working mainly with steam engines. His son, Joseph Farcot, was also a noted inventor.

== Early years ==
Marie-Joseph-Denis Farcot was born in 1798. His father was Joseph Jean Chrysostome Farcot, a former teacher at the college of Juilly, Seine-et-Marne. (Note: Joseph Jean Chrysostome Farcot was born at Senlis on 8 April 1744. He was a member of the Congregation of the Oratory where he was in turn a teacher of philosophy, experimental physics and mathematics. In 1779 he was forced to leave the congregation for family reasons, and took to commerce. He moved to Paris, and ran his business until 1793, when his shops were seized and he was thrown in jail. After 11 months he was released and became a member of the directory of the department of the Seine, charged with restoring buildings for Catholic worship. He held various other posts including a member of the arts council, member of the council on public education and director of statistics. He died on 23 August 1815, aged 71.) He was orphaned at a young age, and became an apprentice with Achille Colas and with Jecker, an expert maker of precision instruments. In 1820 he began work in the studio of Chaillot, where he learned steam engine construction. His training led him to create steam engines that were also precise instruments.

== Manufacturer and inventor ==
In 1823 Farcot established a workshop on the rue Neuve-Sainte-Geneviève. In 1829 he received a bronze medal for two inventions, a variable-speed pump and a pump with two pistons in one body, giving a continuous jet. In 1834 he was awarded a silver medal for an olive oil press. In 1836 Marie-Joseph Farcot patented the first method of steam distribution that gave almost complete variability to the regulator. In 1839 he had transferred his workshop to the rue Moreau, and that year received another silver medal for an innovative steam engine with variable power.

In 1846 he transferred his metallurgical factory to Saint-Ouen, Seine-Saint-Denis, where he purchased land covering 4 hectares (9.9 acres). The factory was accessible by railway branches from the north and the west. It mainly produced steam engines, but also made boilers, pumps and other products. The factory employed 145 workers in 1849, and 500 to 700 between 1872 and 1902. Marie-Joseph Farcot worked with his son, Jean Joseph Léon Farcot, who obtained many patents for mechanical engineering inventions, notably the servomechanism. Their company was called Farcot and Son.

In 1854 Marie-Joseph Farcot was awarded patents for two ways to modify Watt's governor so as to eliminate offset. In 1857 Marie-Joseph Farcot proposed a number of improvements to steam hammer design, including an arrangement so the steam acted from above, increasing the striking force, improved valve arrangements and the use of springs and material to absorb the shock and prevent breakage. He and his son Jean Joseph obtained another governor patent in 1862, and in 1864 a patent for a spring-loaded governor.

== Sources ==
- Artizan Club (Great Britain) (1868). A treatise on the steam-engine in its various applications to mines, mills, steam navigation, railways, and agriculture: with theoretical investigations respecting the motive power of heat and the proper proportions of steam-engines, elaborate tables of the right dimensions of every part, and practical instructions for the manufacture and management of every species of engine in actual use. Longmans, Green. p. 301.
- Bennett, Stuart (1986-01-01). A History of Control Engineering, 1800-1930. IET. ISBN 978-0-86341-047-5.
- Gille, Bertrand (1978). Histoire des Techniques. Gallimard, Encyclopedie de la Pléiade. ISBN 978-2-07-010881-7.
- Glaire, Jean Baptiste; Walsh, Joseph-Alexis; Chantrel, Joseph; Orse, Edouard Alletz (1846). "Farcot, Joseph-Jean-Chrysostome". Encyclopédie catholique, répertoire universel et raisonné des sciences, des lettres, des arts et des métiers, formant une bibliothèque universelle, avec la biographie des hommes célèbres: ornée de plus de 3000 gravures dans le texte et refermant le résumé de plus de dix mille ouvrages. P. Desbarres.
- Katz, Cécile (2003). Territoire d'usines: Seine-Saint-Denis. creaphis editions. p. 50. ISBN 978-2-913610-30-9.
- Patent office (1871). Patents for inventions. Abridgments of specifications. p. 1900.
- Tresca (1876). "Marie-Joseph Farcot". Bulletin de la Société d'encouragement pour l'industrie nationale. p. 153.
