= Steering engine =

Type of power steering for ships

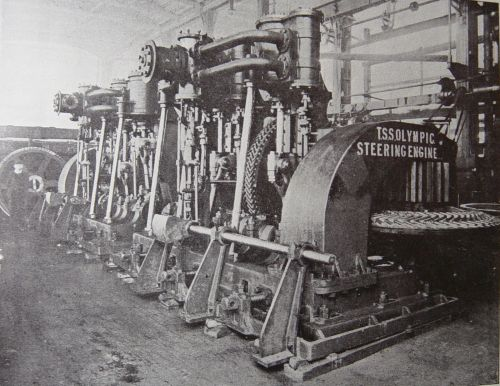
Steering engine of RMS Olympic, circa 1910

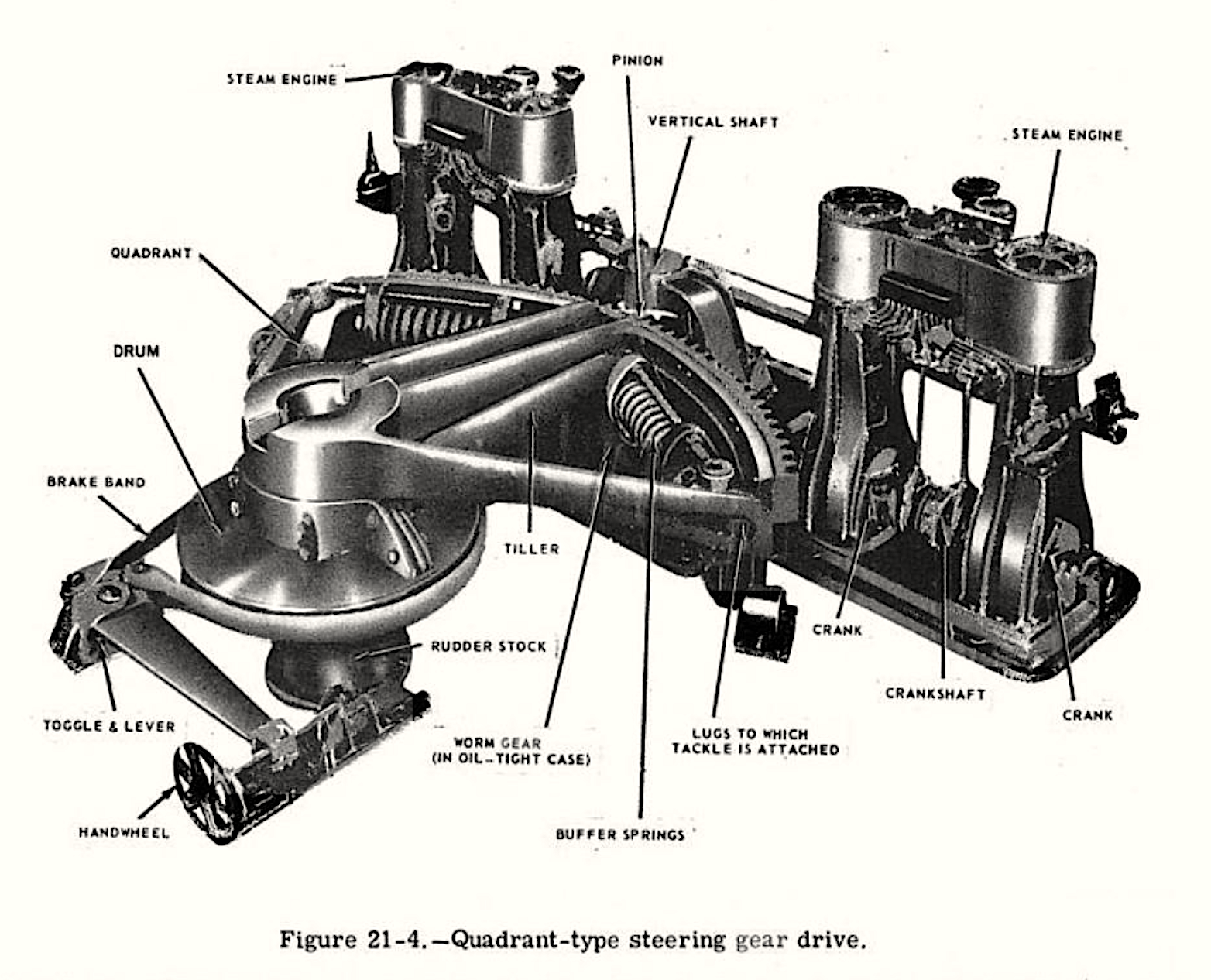
Steam steering engine from US warship

A steering engine is a power steering device for ships. It came into use in 1866, with the steamship Great Eastern, and thereafter was gradually introduced on all large, steam-powered vessels. It was superseded in use by the hydraulic ram in the 1930s.

== History ==
Prior to the invention of the steering engine, large steam-powered warships with manual steering needed huge crews to turn the rudder rapidly. The Royal Navy once used 78 men hauling on block and tackle gear to manually turn the rudder on HMS Minotaur, in a test of manual vs. steam powered steering.

The first steering engine with feedback was installed on Isambard Kingdom Brunel's Great Eastern in 1866. Designed by Scottish engineer John McFarlane Gray and built by George Forrester and Company, this was a steam-powered mechanical amplifier used to drive the rudder position to match the wheel position. The size of Great Eastern, by far the largest ship of her day, made power steering a necessity. Steam-powered steering engines were employed on large steamships after that.

== Operation ==
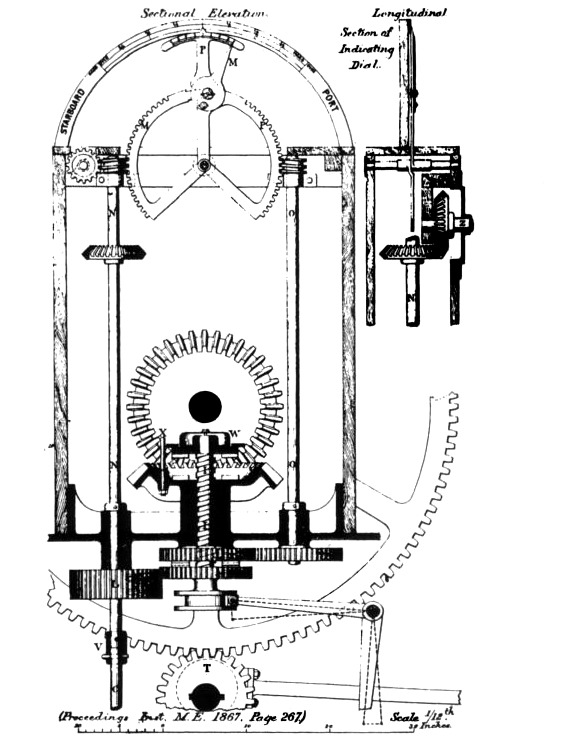
Gray steering engine: the output from the differential gears (centre) controlled the steam valve

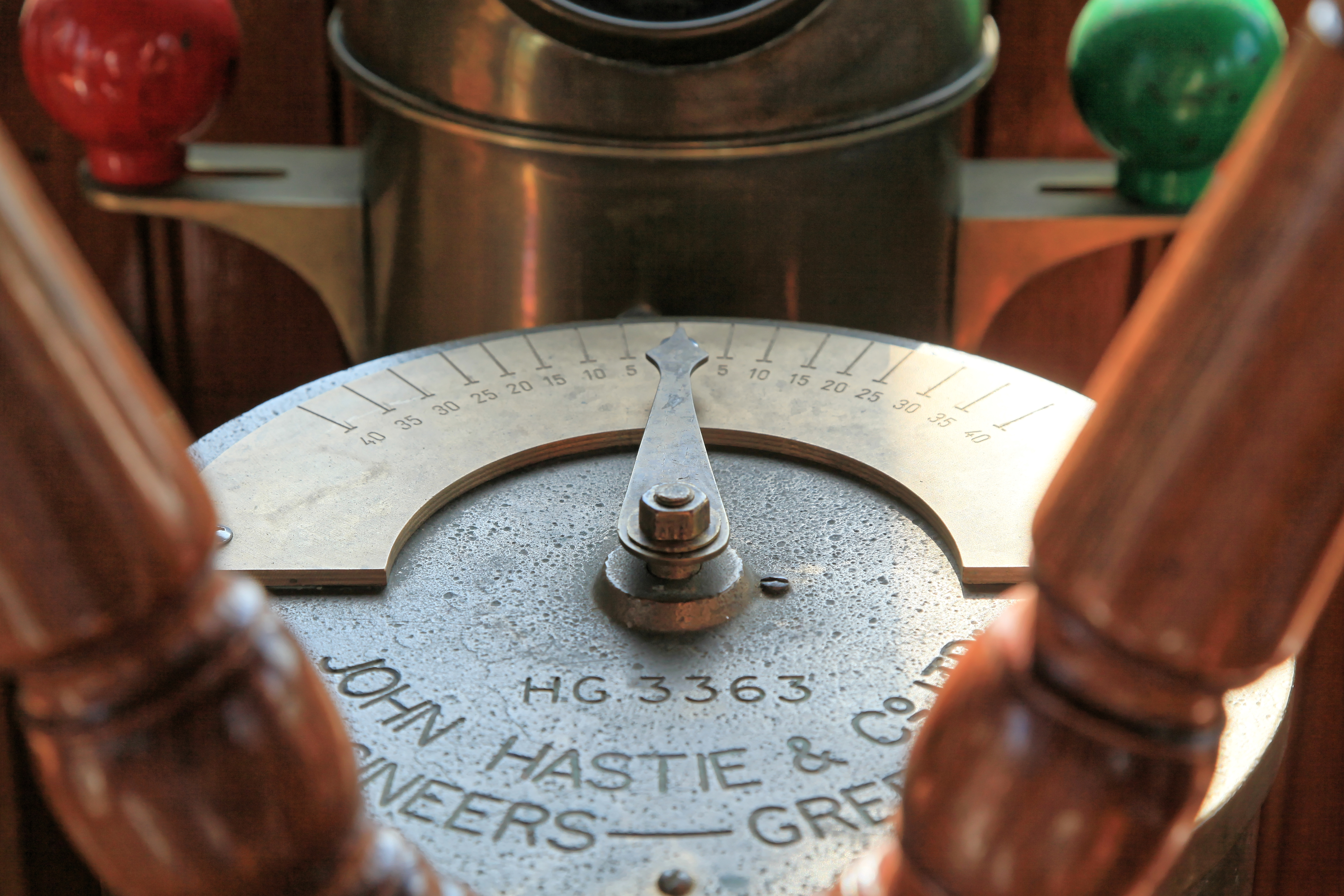
Rudder position indicator at the helm

The system invented by John McFarlane Gray in 1866 for the steamship Great Eastern was the first to incorporate feedback to stop and hold the rudder in the position demanded by the wheel. The mechanism incorporated shafts, bevel gears, and differential gears between the wheel and the rudder stock, so that the combined output of the gears controlled a reversible steam valve, through a screw mechanism and a lever. When the wheel was first moved, the steam valve opened and the engine turned the stock through a pinion wheel and quadrant gear. When the position of the gears attached to the wheel and the stock “agreed” (with the input from the wheel stationary), the rotation of the differential gear returned the steam valve to its central position and the rudder was held. Returning the wheel reversed the process.

In later systems, a rotating shaft and gears carried the movement of the steering wheel to a large screw-threaded shaft next to the steering engine. Turning the shaft opened a reversible steam valve, through a "nut" (a sturdy metal sleeve with an internal thread) and a lever. When the ship's wheel was turned steam was admitted to the steering engine, which moved in the required direction. However, at the same time, the nut was being rotated, by gearing from the engine, along the screw in the direction that closed the valve. Therefore, only when the ship’s wheel was actually being turned was steam admitted to the engine, otherwise the nut’s movement along the shaft restored the valve to the closed position, stopping the engine. An indicator at the wheel showed the angle of the rudder.

By the 1930s steam steering engines were being replaced by hydraulic rams, driven by electric pumps.

== Other systems ==
The Mississippi River-style steamboat Belle of Louisville is fitted with a steering engine. Original equipment when the boat was launched at Pittsburgh in 1915, the engine consists of a single double-acting steam cylinder, mounted laterally aft of and above the main engines and coupled to the rudders. The steam valves of the engine are controlled by mechanical linkages which extend to levers mounted either side of the engine order telegraph, just aft of the pilot wheel in the pilot house above. There is no feedback mechanism: the wheel is stopped with the levers and a footbrake (that acts on the rim of the steering wheel) when the desired position is reached. The purpose of the engine is to enable a single helmsman to turn the wheel quickly; this is necessary because the combination of the vessel's shallow draft and high above-water profile require rapid changes in rudder under shifting wind conditions. The steering engine is open to public view.

== See also ==
- Power steering
- Servomechanism
- Ship's wheel
