= Crewe type (locomotive) =

Series of steam locomotive designs

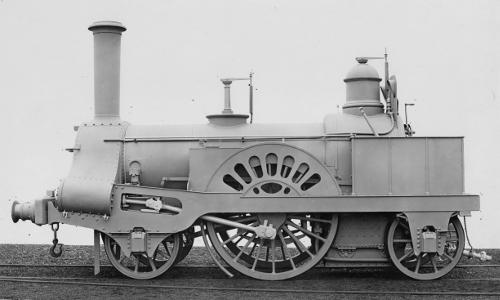
Allan's 'Crewe' type locomotive, a LNWR 6ft 2-2-2 in photographic grey livery, 1875

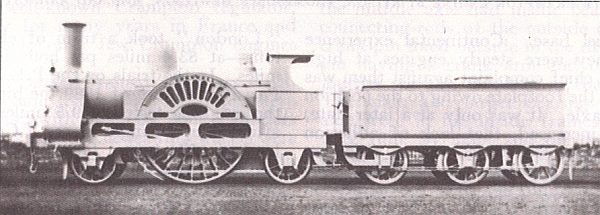
'Crewe' type' 2-2-2 locomotive Cornwall as modified 1858

The Crewe type locomotive was a series of designs of steam locomotive by Alexander Allan and William Buddicom during the 1840s. It was widely copied elsewhere, particularly in France.

== History ==
During the early 1840s, Alexander Allan and William Buddicom of the Grand Junction Railway (GJR) created the design incorporating inclined outside cylinders and a double frame. It was built to combat the frequent failure of crank axles on contemporary inside cylinder locomotive designs. The earliest examples were built by Buddicom at Chartreux for the Chemins de Fer de l'Ouest in 1844 where the type became known as 'Le Buddicom'.

The first British examples were built at Crewe Works in 1845 by the GJR and from 1846 by the GJR's successor, the London and North Western Railway (LNWR), with a 2-2-2 wheel arrangement for passenger classes and 2-4-0 for freight.

The first of these GJR 2-2-2 locomotives, Columbine, has been preserved. After 26 years at the Science Museum in London, it was moved to the National Railway Museum in York in 2026. It carried GJR fleet number 49, and was withdrawn from service in 1902 by the LNWR, carrying their number 1868.

These designs were widely copied by other railways both in the UK and overseas during the 1850s and 1860s. Among the last UK examples to be built were the Highland Railway Strath Class of 1892.
