= Mather, Dixon and Company =

- Industry: Engineering
- Founded: 1826
- Defunct: 1843
- Headquarters: Bath Street Foundry, Liverpool, Liverpool, England
- Products: Locomotives

Mather, Dixon and Company was an engineering firm in Liverpool, England. It was established in 1826 at the Bath Street Foundry to build marine and stationary steam engines. Production of steam locomotives began in 1827.

== Products ==
=== Early years ===
The first engine was a small four-coupled tank locomotive in 1827, in addition to a steam traverser and two mobile cranes. These were for their own use, their main business being marine and stationary engines.

=== Contracts from Edward Bury and Company ===
They received contracts from Edward Bury and Company for three engines for the Petersburg Railroad. Two were four coupled and the other was a four-wheeled single, completed in 1833. The following year a number of orders were fulfilled for tank engines among other equipment.

=== Six wheeled engines ===
In 1836 they had four designs for six wheeled engines: 2-2-2, 0-4-2, 0-6-0 and 0-4-2, which they built initially for display purposes.

=== Standard and broad gauge locomotives ===
Between 1836 and 1839 they supplied engines for the London and Birmingham Railway, the Liverpool and Manchester Railway and the Birmingham and Derby Junction Railway among others. These were all "Bury" types. some two dozen in all. However they also built broad gauge engines for the Great Western Railway with seven and eight foot drivers.

== Changes and closure ==
In 1839 the company moved to the North Foundry, in William Street, Bootle. In 1842, John Grantham joined the company, which was renamed Mather, Dixon and Grantham. After 1840, however, trade had declined and, although six engines had been built for stock, the firm closed down in 1843, having built seventy five locomotives in all.
