= Alexander Allan (locomotive engineer) =

British locomotive engineer

- Born: 1809; Montrose, Angus
- Died: 2 June 1891 (aged 81–82); Scarborough, Yorkshire
- Engineering career
- Discipline: Mechanical engineering
- Institutions: Institution of Mechanical Engineers
- Significant design: straight-link valve gear

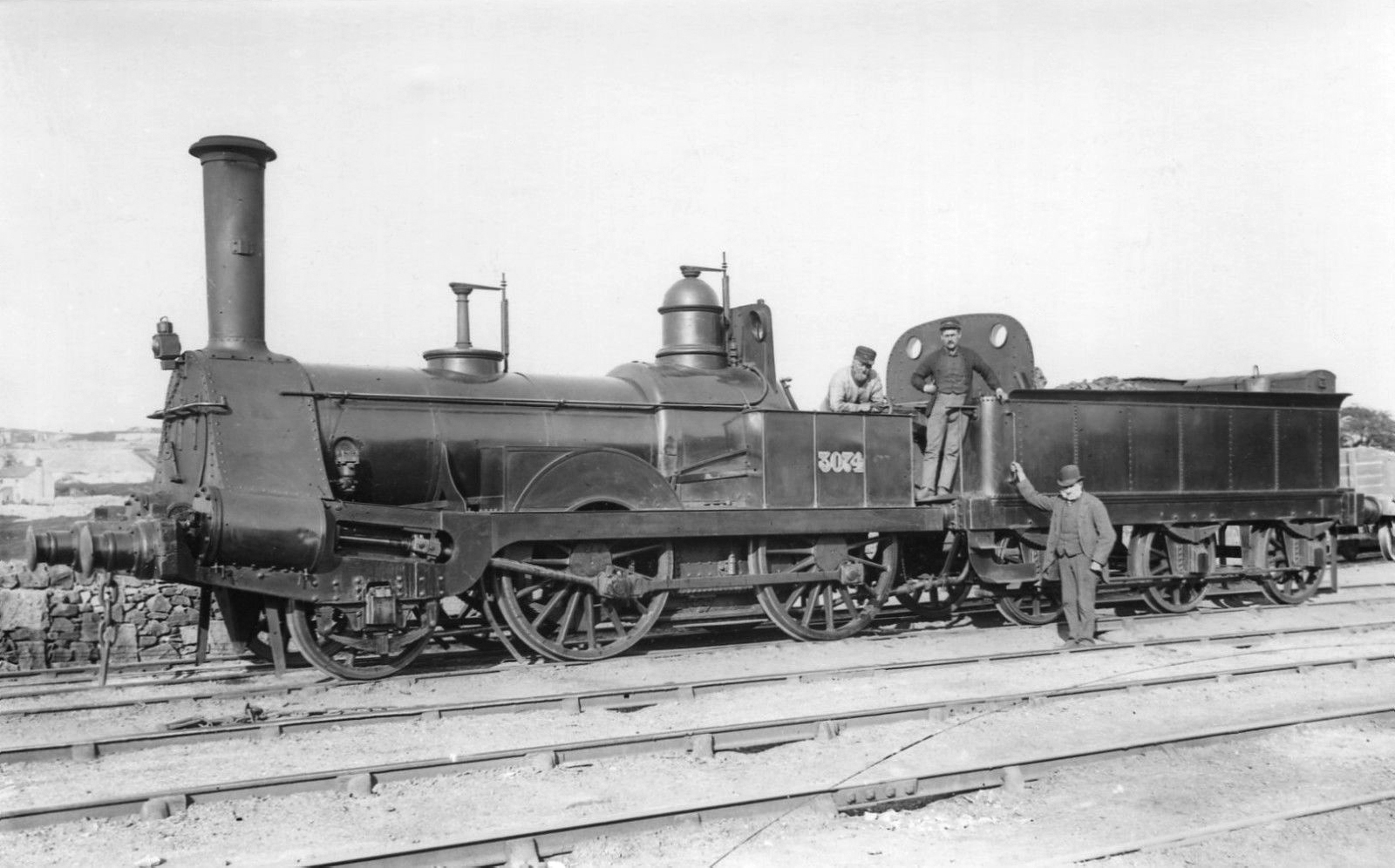
LNWR No. 3074, Allan's 'Crewe' goods engine designed for the GJR, introduced 1846

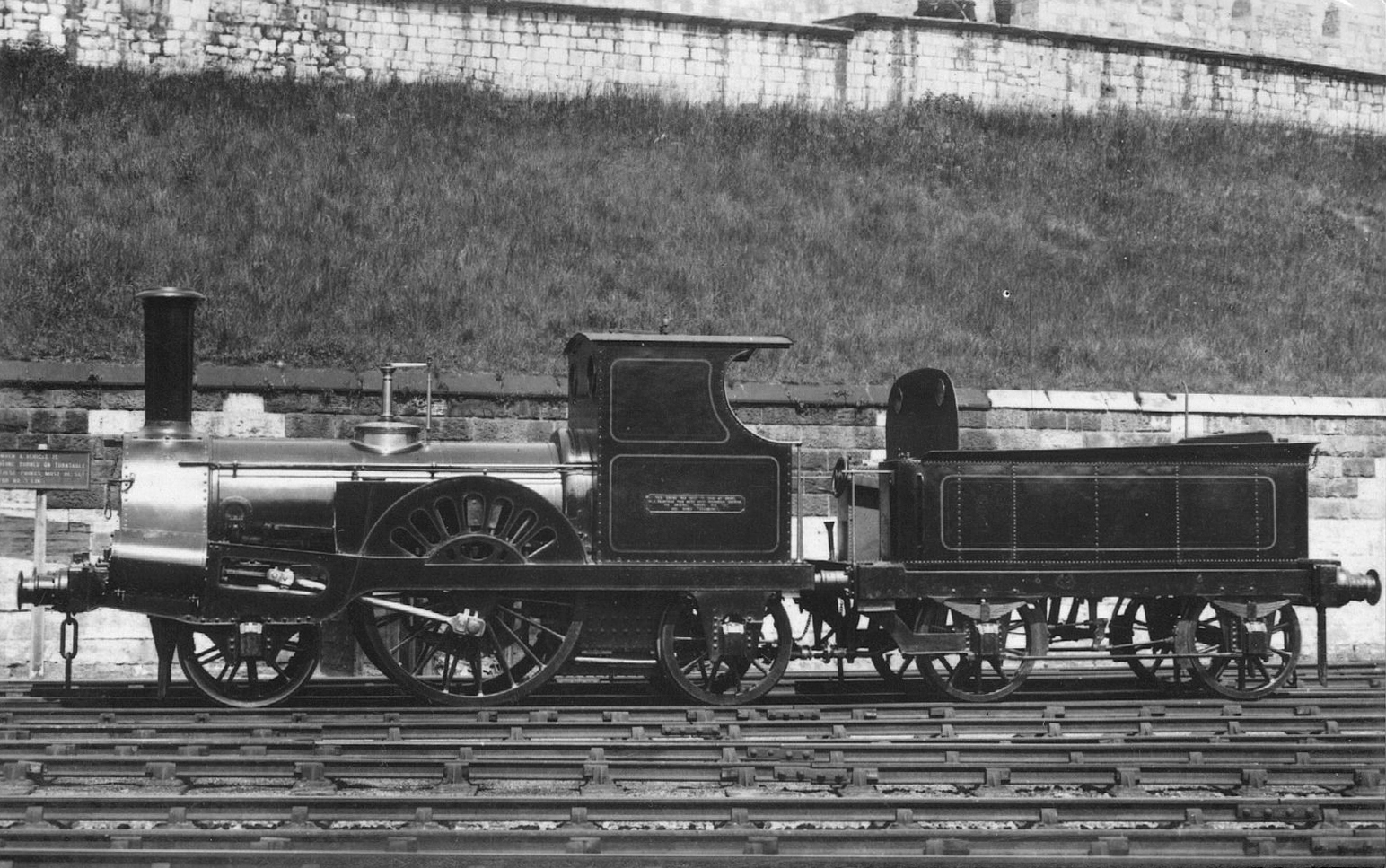
Allan's 2-2-2 Columbine, GJR No. 49, LNWR No. 1868 with cab, built 1845 withdrawn 1902

Alexander Allan (1809-1891) was a Scottish mechanical engineer. He was born at Montrose, Angus, in 1809 and died at Scarborough, Yorkshire on 2 June 1891.

== Biography ==
Allan was born in Montrose, Angus, Scotland in 1809. He undertook a apprenticeship to Mr. Gibb, a millwright. In 1832 aged about 23 he took a position at Robert Stephenson and Company, Newcastle upon Tyne. By 1834 he had moved to Liverpool and taken up a position with George Forrester and Company who were about to begin building railway locomotives.

Allan was works manager for George Forrester and Company until 1840. He was the engineer sent for a year to supervise the maintenance of the three Forrester engines Vauxhall, Dublin and Kingstown for the first year of their service at Dublin and Kingstown Railway in 1834.

From 1843 to 1853 he was Works Manager at the Crewe Works of the Grand Junction Railway, later London and North Western Railway, under Francis Trevithick. He later claimed the credit for designing the Crewe type locomotive with inclined cylinders and double frames, but this claim has been challenged. From 1853 to 1865 he was Locomotive Superintendent of the Scottish Central Railway. Allan was an original member of the Institution of Mechanical Engineers in 1847.

== Inventions ==
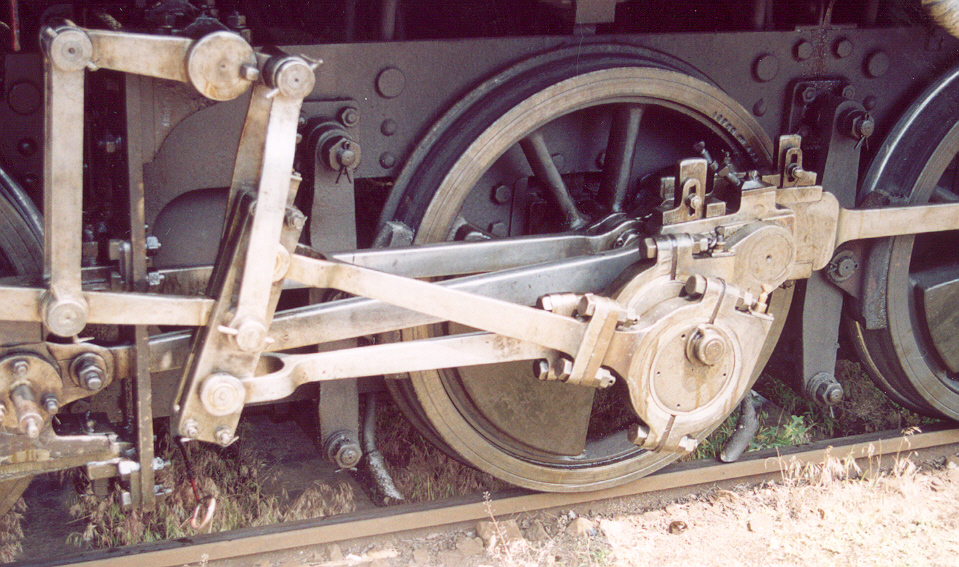
Allan valve gear, seen here fitted to an early Austrian locomotive

Allan made a number of inventions, including a balanced slide valve, but the best-known is his straight-link valve gear of 1855.

== See also ==
- George Forrester and Company
- Locomotives of the London and North Western Railway

== Sources ==
- LNWR Society (2007). "LNWRS Glossary". London and North Western Railway Society. Archived from the original on 17 October 2007.
- Institution of Mechanical Engineers (1891). "Proceedings 1891". Institution of Mechanical Engineers. London.
- Lowe, James W. (2014) [1975]. British Steam Locomotives Builders. Pen & Sword Transport. ISBN 978-1-47382-289-4. OCLC 889509628.
- Murray, Kevin (1981). Ireland's First Railway. Dublin: Irish Railway Record Society. ISBN 0-904078-07-8.
- Stuart, D. H.; Reed, Brian (1971). The Crewe Type (Loco Profile No 15).

Preceded by Robert Sinclair	Locomotive Superintendent of Scottish Central Railway; 1854-1865	Succeeded by Post abolished when S.C.R. absorbed by Caledonian Railway
