= Dodds Horsley Star (locomotive) =

Early 1833 locomotive with single pair of driving wheels used in England and Ireland

Star
Type and origin
- Power type: Steam
- Designer: Isaac Dodds
- Builder: Horseley Coal & Iron Company, Tipton
- Build date: 1833
- Total produced: 1
- Rebuilder: Grand Canal Street
- Number rebuilt: 1
Specifications
- Configuration
  - Whyte: 2-2-0; 2-2-2 (On rebuild)
- Fuel type: Coke
- Cylinders: 2
- Couplers: Bergin (retrofit)
Career
- Operators: Liverpool and Manchester Railway (Note: Trials only); Dublin and Kingstown Railway
- Number in class: 1
- Delivered: September 1835 (To D&KR)
- First run: 1833
- Withdrawn: 1840
- Disposition: Scrapped

Star was a locomotive designed by Isaac Dodds of the 2-2-0 configuration and built in 1833 at the Horseley Coal & Iron Company, Tipton, Birmingham, England. Despite rebuilds, it was never a successful engine, and was scrapped in 1840.

== History ==
Isaac Dodds became engaged with the Horseley Iron Company in the summer of 1832, and was seeming ably to facilitate orders from throughout the British Isles. In 1833 the Liverpool and Manchester Railway, a leading railway operating company of that time, opened a competition for a new locomotive design. The Dodd's designed entry through Horsley was seemingly the best, with new innovations claimed included a slid plate frame, expanding boiler attachment plates at the firebox end, and horizontal cylinders fitted outside the frame. The resulting locomotive Star was initially trialled on the Liverpool and Manchester Railway (L&MR).

=== Liverpool and Manchester ===
A serious accident occurred on the L&MR when points were set incorrectly and Star ran onto the opposite track and collided with Caledonian leaving both badly damaged, an engineman killed, and a mechanic with a crushed foot. The accident occurred around February/March 1835 and the L&MR, while willing to pay for repairs were not prepared to purchase Star (Note: Some sources quote the Star/Caledonian accident on 28 February 1935; with some quoting the name Caledonia)

=== Dublin and Kingstown ===
Star was subsequently bought by the Dublin and Kingstown Railway (D&KR) in April 1835. Before the line opened D&KR directors received advice from their consultants for the number of locomotives needed for their line. As Rastrick specified four and Charles Blacker Vignoles recommended eight the directors settled on a median of six, though the D&KR later settled on nine. The collision of two locomotives in March 1835 plus ongoing maintenance problems left the D&KR with a possible motive power shortage. In May 1835 Pollock, the representative of Star's owner Horlseys, offered the locomotive to increase their stock. The D&KR's Company clerk Bergin was also an engineer and in England at the time, and recommended the purchase of Star; ultimately an offer for £700 was accepted.

Star arrived in Ireland in September 1835. The engine was not in good order with unsafe wheels, bent rods and incorrectly adjusted valved gear, and on inspection Bergin said the D&KR would not pay for it until repaired and acceptance trials completed. Payment was completed in December 1836.

A bonus payment was given to locomotive superintendent John Melling in February 1838 for his rebuilding of Star. However Star suffered at least five derailments, one with a broken axle, until a collision with the locomotive Victoria in June 1840. Inspection showed prohibitively high repair costs, compounded by previous inadequate repairs and various parts being worn out. Star was scrapped later that year, with some parts being reused for Bellisle.
