= D&KR Burgoyne Class =

Early Irish steam locomotive class

Burgoyne
Type and origin
- Power type: Steam
- Designer: James Rawlins
- Builder: Grand Canal Street
- Build date: 1845
- Total produced: 4
- Rebuild date: c.1856 & 1866
- Number rebuilt: 4 & 2
Specifications
- Configuration
  - Whyte: 2-2-2WT
- Gauge: 4 ft 8 1/2 in (1,435 mm); 5 ft 3 in (1,600 mm) (c.1856)
- Leading dia.: 4 ft 0 in (1,220 mm)
- Driver dia.: 5 ft 6 in (1,680 mm)
- Trailing dia.: 3 ft 6 in (1,070 mm)
- Wheelbase
  - Engine: 11 ft 1/2 in (3,366 mm)
  - Leading: 6 ft 1 in (1,850 mm)
  - Trailing: 4 ft 11 1/2 in (1,511 mm)
- Loco weight: 20 long tons (20 t); 22 long tons (22 t)(1866)
- Fuel type: Coke (as delivered)
- Fuel capacity: 15 mi (24 km)
- Water cap.: 400 imp gal (1,800 L; 480 US gal)
- Boiler
  - Type: Domeless (domed 1866 rebuild)
- Boiler pressure: 90 lbf/in^{2} (0.62 MPa); 125 lbf/in^{2} (0.86 MPa)(1866)
- Cylinders: 2
- Cylinder size: 14 in × 20 in (356 mm × 508 mm)
- Couplers: Bergin
Career
- Operators: Dublin and Kingstown Railway; Dublin and Wicklow Railway; Dublin, Wicklow and Wexford Railway
- Number in class: 4
- Nicknames: Quakers
- First run: 1845
- Withdrawn: 1887
- Disposition: Scrapped

Burgoyne was the class lead for a set of four locomotives, built by the Dublin and Kingstown Railway (D&KR). It was built in their own Grand Canal Street works from 1845.

== History ==
Following the death of Richard Pim in August 1843 James Rawlins, a foreman at Grand Canal Street took position of locomotive superintendent. Construction of the five locomotives of the Princess class had finished in 1843 however trains were becoming heavier and beyond the capability of the earlier locomotives. The D&KR were essentially happy with basic 2-2-2WT tank locomotives, but sent Rawlins to England to become acquainted with the latest developments in locomotive development before embarking on the stronger design.

The class lead was Burgoyne, built in 1845 and named after Sir John Fox Burgoyne (the Commissioner of Public Works). The commissioner was crucial to the D&KR obtaining public loans for the building of the railway, and had given advice on the strengthening of sea embankments in 1836. Subsequent locomotives were named Cyclops, Vulcan and Jupiter and were completed in by 1847–8. Jupiter was the last new build locomotive for the D&KR. (Note: Some might argue the reconstruction Comet in 1851 to a Princess Class was more of a new locomotive than a rebuild)

As built in common will all D&KR tank engines the locomotives did not have brakes, the drivers stopping the locomotives when running light (Note: Running light means the engines running not connected to any other railway vehicles) by skilled use of the reversing gear. A bad collision with Cyclops coming with a train into Westland Row Station caused this policy to be altered and brakes were subsequently fitted to the locomotives.

With the conversion of Westland Row to Kingstown from 4 ft 8 1/2 in (1,435 mm) standard gauge to 5 ft 3 in (1,600 mm) Irish gauge c. 1856 with the takeover of operations by the Dublin and Wicklow Railway all four were converted to fit the new gauge, losing the Bergin central buffer and moving to corner buffers and orthodox couplings at the same time.

1864 saw the bulk of Westland Row to Kingstown and Bray services handed over to the seven new locomotives Ariel Class from Neilsons which dwarfed the Burgonyes. (Note: Murray (1981), p. 194 comments the Ariel proved to be power value, being of "low-power" and having a short life). This led to the withdrawal of Burgoyne and Jupiter by 1872; while Cyclops and Vulcan were rebuilt in 1866 with longer boilers.

The Cyclops and Vulcan remained in service until the 1887 and long enough to acquire the DW&WR numbers 27 and 28.

== Fleet ==
Name	Introduced	Rebuilt 5' 3"	Rebuilt	DW&WR No.	Withdrawn	Notes
Burgoyne	1845	1856			1864-1872	Named in honour of Sir John Fox Burgoyne
Cyclops	1847	1856	1866	27	1887	
Vulcan	1847	1856	1866	28	1887	
Jupiter	1848	1856			1876	Final new locomotive of D&KR
