= Experiment (locomotive) =

L&MR 32 Experiment
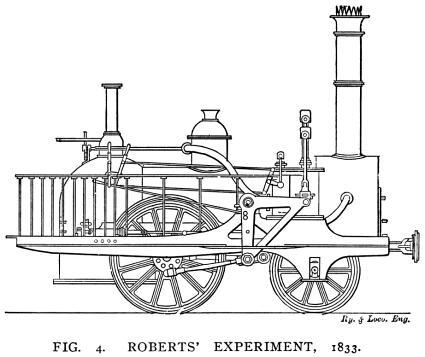
Type and origin
- Power type: Steam
- Designer: Richard Roberts
- Builder: Sharp, Roberts and Co.
- Build date: February 1833
Specifications
- Configuration
  - Whyte: 2-2-0
- Gauge: 4 ft 8 1/2 in (1,435 mm)
- Leading dia.: 3 ft 6 in (1.067 m)
- Driver dia.: 5 ft 0 in (1.524 m)
- Cylinders: Two, vertical
- Cylinder size: 13 1/3 in × 18 in (339 mm × 457 mm)
Career
- Operators: Liverpool and Manchester Railway
- Disposition: Sold December 1836; later scrapped

Experiment was a steam locomotive designed and built by Richard Roberts in 1833 for the Liverpool and Manchester Railway (L&MR). The locomotive had vertical cylinders driving via bell cranks.

== History ==
L&MR No.32 Experiment was built in 1833 with vertical cylinders mounted just behind the chimney, driving the wheels via a bell crank. The locomotive also had piston valves. These valves were probably the reason that the design was not a success, rather than the bell crank transmission, which was used successfully in other locomotives. Another reason that the locomotive was not successful was steam leakage from the cylinders. Experiment was withdrawn after a few months.

Three similar locomotives were built for the Dublin and Kingstown Railway. Locomotives to this design were built for the Dundee and Newtyle Railway, but they were soon altered.

== Sources ==
- Baxter, Bertram (1978). Baxter, David (ed.). British Locomotive Catalogue 1825–1923, Volume 2A: London and North Western Railway and its constituent companies. Vol. 2A. Ashbourne, Derbyshire: Moorland Publishing Company. p. 13. ISBN 0-903485-51-6.
