= John Melling (locomotive engineer) =

Early pionneering British locomotive engineer

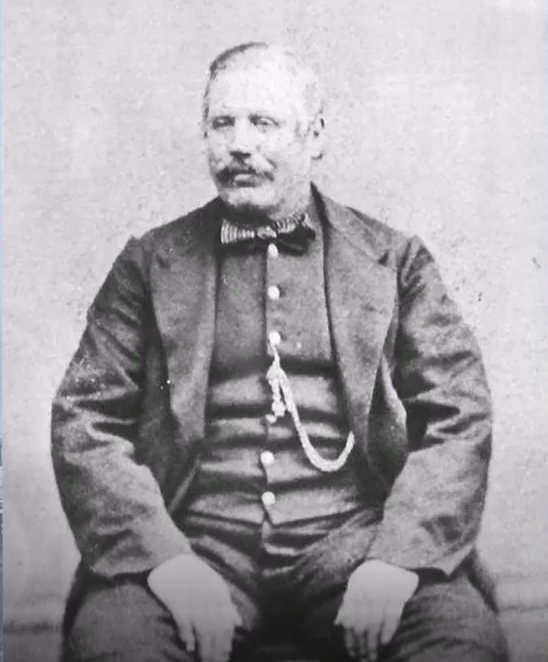
- A photo taken of John Melling (locomotive engineer)
- Born: 1782
- Died: 1856 (aged 73–74)
- Engineering career
- Employer: Liverpool and Manchester Railway

John Melling (1782–1856) was the locomotive superintendent for the Liverpool and Manchester Railway (L&MR) and contributed several railway engineering patents. Melling was a key person in the operation of the L&MR through its early pioneering days.

== Life ==
Melling was born in 1782. In 1833 the L&MR's first locomotive foreman was sacked for gross misconduct, and Melling was appointed to the twin roles of Superintendent of the Engine Shops and Locomotive Foreman. Dawson describes his role as an "unsung hero of the Liverpool and Manchester" in keeping trains moving on the railway during his tenure in that position until January 1840.

In 1833 Melling was to produce a design for an improve firebox for locomotives using hollow, water-filled fire-bars, and an ash-pit integrated into the boiler, the L&MR's management committee instructing this design of a "model firebox" was to be fitted to Experiment.

In December 1839 Melling was given notice to quit within three months, with John Dewrance appointed "Locomotive Superintendent and Foreman of the Engine Shops" in January 1840. Upon leaving Melling and son Thomas were to establish Rainlhill Iron Works. Melling died in 1856.

=== Family ===
Melling's son also named John was appointed to the Dublin and Kingstown Railway (D&KR) in Ireland to relieve Bergin of his direct oversight of the company's mechanical side, a position he was to hold until January 1840 with various commendations until resigning in January 1840 due to bookkeeping irregularities to be succeeded by Richard Pim, a relative of James Pim, the D&KR's treasurer. While Murray (1981) acknowledges his son John, other sources imply Thomas as the only son of note; Thomas was at one time his assistant but left to work for the Grand Junction Railway.
