= Hibernia (locomotive) =

Steam locomotive

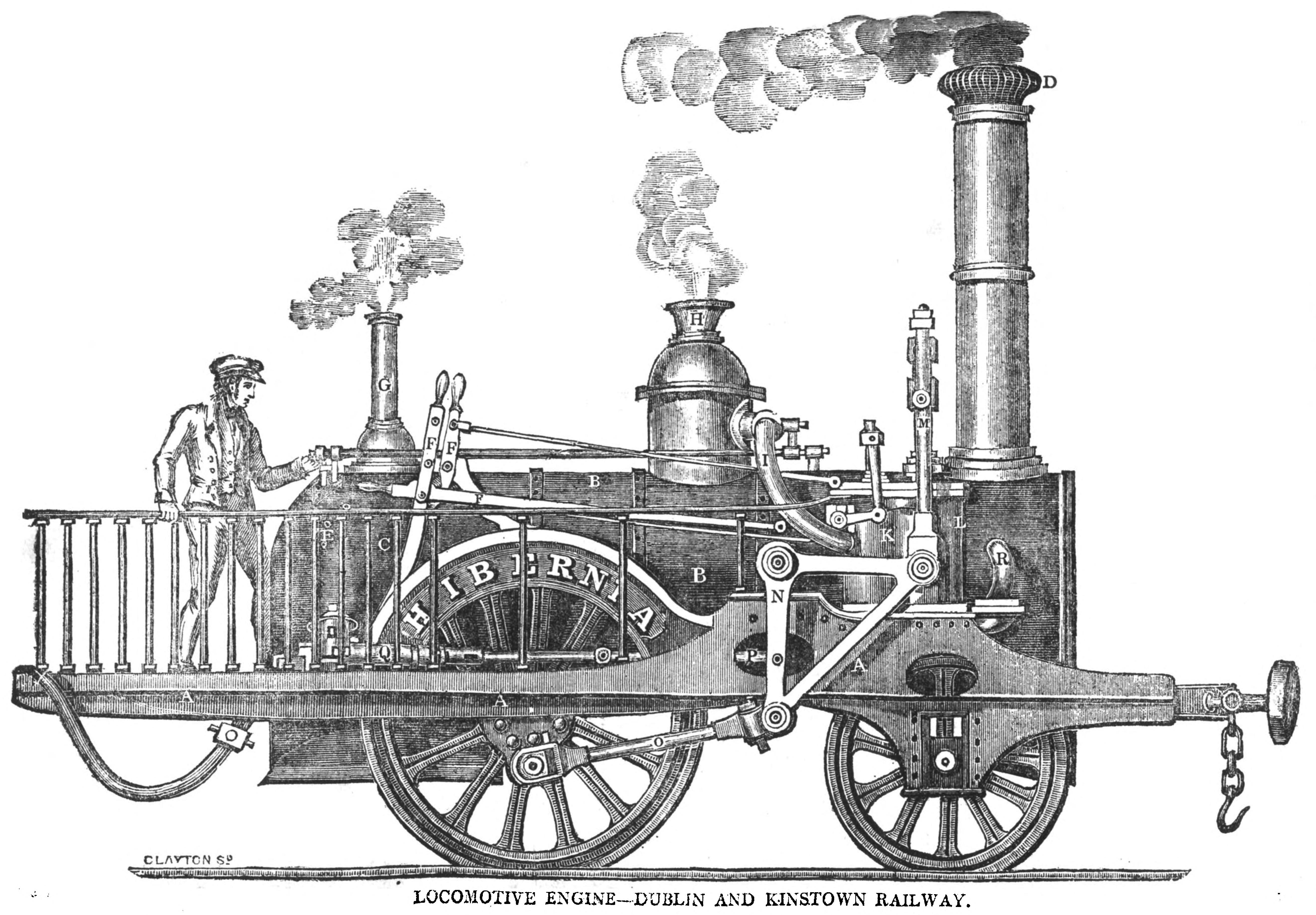
- An early sketch of Hibernia
Type and origin
- Power type: Steam
- Designer: Richard Roberts
- Builder: Sharp, Roberts and Company
- Build date: 1834
Specifications
- Configuration
  - Whyte: 2-2-0
- Gauge: 4 ft 8 1/2 in (1,435 mm) standard gauge
- Leading dia.: 3 feet (0.91 m)
- Driver dia.: 5 feet (1.52 m)
- Fuel type: Coke
- Boiler pressure: 75 lbf/in^{2} (517 kPa; 75 psi)
- Cylinders: Two
- Cylinder size: 11 in × 16 in (279 mm × 406 mm)
Career
- Operators: Dublin and Kingstown Railway
- First run: 9 October 1834 (Note: First run carrying members of the public on a trial run in Ireland. The locomotive may have been involved in other tests on the D&KR and also the London and Manchester Railway in England.)
- Disposition: Scrapped

Hibernia was a steam locomotive designed by Richard Roberts and built by Sharp, Roberts and Company in 1834 for the Dublin and Kingstown Railway (D&KR). The locomotive had vertical cylinders driving via bell cranks.

== History ==
=== Procurement ===
The D&KR waited until August 1833 before inviting nine firms to tender for six identical engines to enable part-swapping for delivery by 1 May 1834. The seven firms replied that timescales were too short, given the infancy of locomotive engineering with manufacturers on a steep learning curve. The D&KR engaged John Urpeth Rastrick who had been judge at the 1829 Rainhill Trials to visit the manufacturers. Rastrick visited six as well as the L&MR works and delivered to board a specification which strongly matched the L&MR No. 32 Experiment from Sharp, Roberts and Co. D&KR's Bergin visited the L&MR and expressed concerns over Experiment's unique features, vibrations and fuel consumption. The D&KR's consultant engineer Charles Blacker Vignoles was particularly concerned with the vertical mounting of the cylinders. A D&KR committee then re-worded the specification to give firms more opportunity to submit their preferred design.

With time running short the D&KR were forced to order from suppliers most likely to be able to deliver within the required timescale. They eventually order three from Sharp, Roberts and Co., the first of which would be Hibernia, the other two being Britannia and Manchester. Three were also ordered from George Forrester and Company's Vauxhall foundry at Liverpool based on their Swiftsure locomotive that were to become Vauxhall, Dublin and Kingstown. (Note: Ordering different designs from two manufacturers was not the D&KR's original plan so they achieve part standardisation but the build timescales may have been one factor and the risk of a design failing may have been another.)

Hibernia was completed in 1834 and was to be followed by several identical models. Power transmission from the vertical cylinders was via bell cranks.

The engine was expected to be able to haul a train of 60 to 80 tons in weight at 20 miles per hour (32 km/h).

Hibernia was sent from the manufacturer at Manchester to Liverpool under its own steam. It was transported by the City of Dublin Steam Packet Company at a cost of £21 plus for £7/10/- for the tender with Forresters' Vauxhall on the same sailing. At Dublin they were taken through the streets on a temporary "portable railway" before 50 men hauled them up to rail level at Westland Row.

=== Trials ===
The L&MR permitted the locomotives to be tested on their line before being shipped to Ireland. In Ireland an "engine hospital" had been set up at Serpentine avenue to allow for their maintenance.

On 9 October 1834, Hibernia hauled a train of eight carriages, which was the first to traverse the complete length of the line carrying members of the public. While this was the first trial to traverse the length of the line from Westland Row to Salthill the locomotive Vauxhall had done a shorter trial run with a small train from Dublin to the Martello Tower at Williamstown which is now part of Blackrock Park.

In a test run on 1 November 1834, Hibernia, running with just the engine and tender, was claimed to have achieved a maximum speed of 60 miles per hour (97 km/h) over 0.25 miles (0.40 km) by Charles Blacker Vignoles.

=== Operations ===
The design is assessed in (Lyons 2015, p. 81) as not being a great success. Lyons suggests the issue may have been the use of piston valves rather than the bell crank transmission. The vertical cylinders caused considerable pounding resulting in damage to the locomotives axles and springs; significant damage was also caused to the track with rail fractures and subsidence being noted.

Hibernia was withdrawn after blowing up at Kingstown in 1842. The two sister engines Britannia and Manchester were also withdrawn.

== Model ==
An O Gauge model of Hibernia built by Cyril Fry exists in the Fry Model Collection along with examples of its associated carriages.
