= Llandysilio =

Village in Powys, Wales

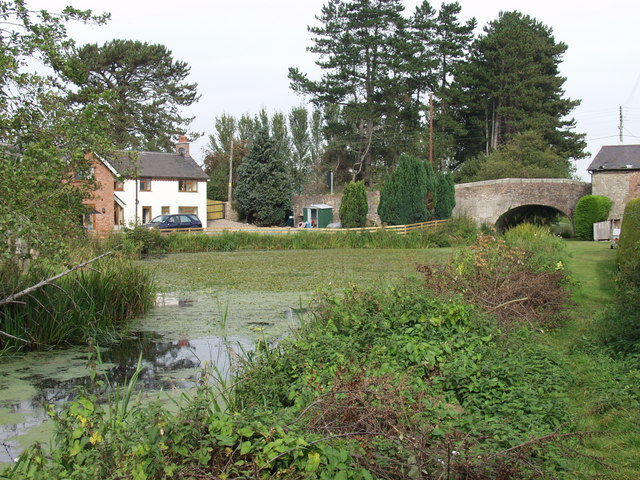
- Montgomery Canal Bridge in Llandysilio

- Location within Powys
- Population: 1,122 (2011 census)
- OS grid reference: SJ268196
- Principal area: Powys
- Preserved county: Powys
- Country: Wales
- Sovereign state: United Kingdom
- Post town: LLANYMYNECH
- Postcode district: SY22
- Dialling code: 01691
- Police: Dyfed-Powys
- Fire: Mid and West Wales
- Ambulance: Welsh
- UK Parliament: Montgomeryshire and Glyndŵr
- Senedd Cymru – Welsh Parliament: Montgomeryshire
- List of places UK Wales Powys 52.769306°N 3.0852056°W Community map: Map of the community

Llandysilio is a small village and community in Montgomeryshire, Powys, Wales.

The community population at the 2001 Census was 962, increasing to 1,122 at the 2011 census. The present parish church, dedicated to Saint Tysilio, dates from 1867 but tradition states that a church was founded here by Tysilio in the seventh century. The community includes the village of Four Crosses.

== Notable people ==
Robert Baugh (1748–1832), a Welsh surveyor, copper-plate engraver, map-maker and print-maker came from the village; as did, probably, Rev. Elias Owen MA, F.S.A. (1833–1899), a Welsh cleric and antiquarian.

== Governance ==
An electoral ward in the same name exists. This ward had a population of 1,789 at the 2011 Census.
