= Sharp, Stewart and Company =

British locomotive manufacturer, 1852–1903

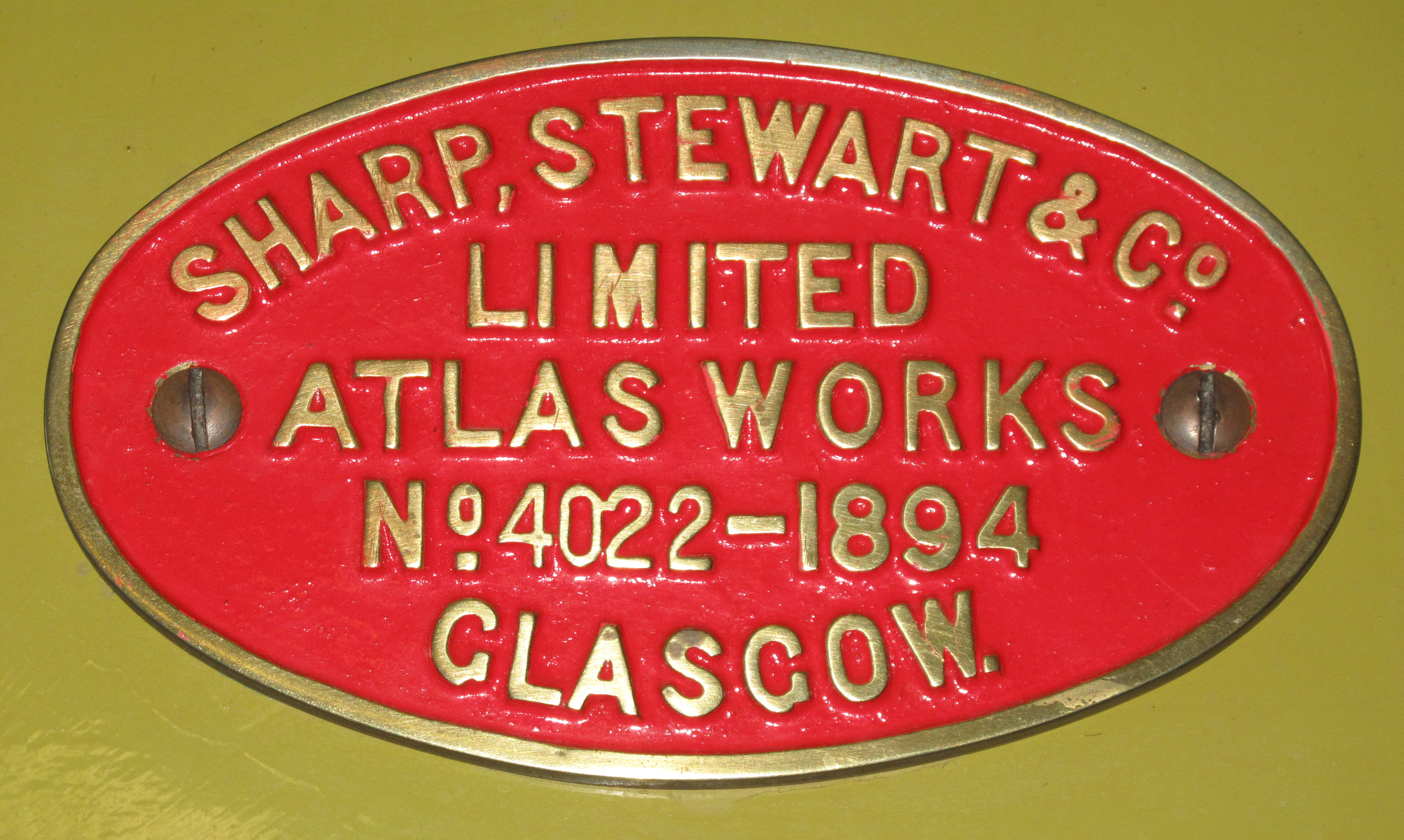
- Maker's plate from preserved Highland Railway "Jones Goods" No. 103
- Industry: Locomotive manufacturing
- Predecessor: Sharp, Roberts and Company (1828–1843); Sharp Brothers and Company (1843–1852)
- Founded: 1852
- Defunct: 1903
- Fate: Merged
- Successor: North British Locomotive Company
- Headquarters: Manchester, England; Glasgow, Scotland from 1888

Sharp, Stewart and Company was a steam locomotive manufacturer, originally based in Manchester, England. The company was established in 1843 following the dissolution of Sharp, Roberts & Co.. In 1888, it relocated to Glasgow, Scotland, where it later amalgamated with two other Glasgow-based locomotive manufacturers to form the North British Locomotive Company.

== Sharp Brothers ==
In 1823 iron merchant Thomas Sharp and his brothers Robert Chapman Sharp and John Sharp formed Sharp Brothers.

== Sharp, Roberts & Company ==
Mechanical engineer Richard Roberts became a partner in 1828 with the firm becoming Sharp, Roberts & Co. (about which, see also company section in article on Roberts), to manufacture textile machinery, machine tools and stationary steam engines.

In 1833 they designed and built a railway locomotive, no.32 Experiment for the Liverpool and Manchester Railway. It was a four-wheeled 2-2-0 with vertical cylinders over the leading wheels. After a number of modifications, three similar locomotives (Britannia, Manchester, and Hibernia) were built in 1834 for the Dublin and Kingstown Railway. Although they were relatively fast, they suffered from steam leakages and the vertical cylinders meant they were very hard on the track at speed.

In 1834 Charles Beyer joined the firm as a junior draughtsman, he progressed and contributed to the company's success in locomotive building reputedly doing most of the locomotive design work.

After their experience with the first four locomotives they constructed 2-2-2's to fill an order for ten locomotives placed by the Grand Junction Railway in late 1835, these had horizontal inside cylinders under the smokebox and additional bearings to support the crank axle. They were designed by Beyer under Roberts's supervision and delivered to the Grand Junction Railway in 1837.

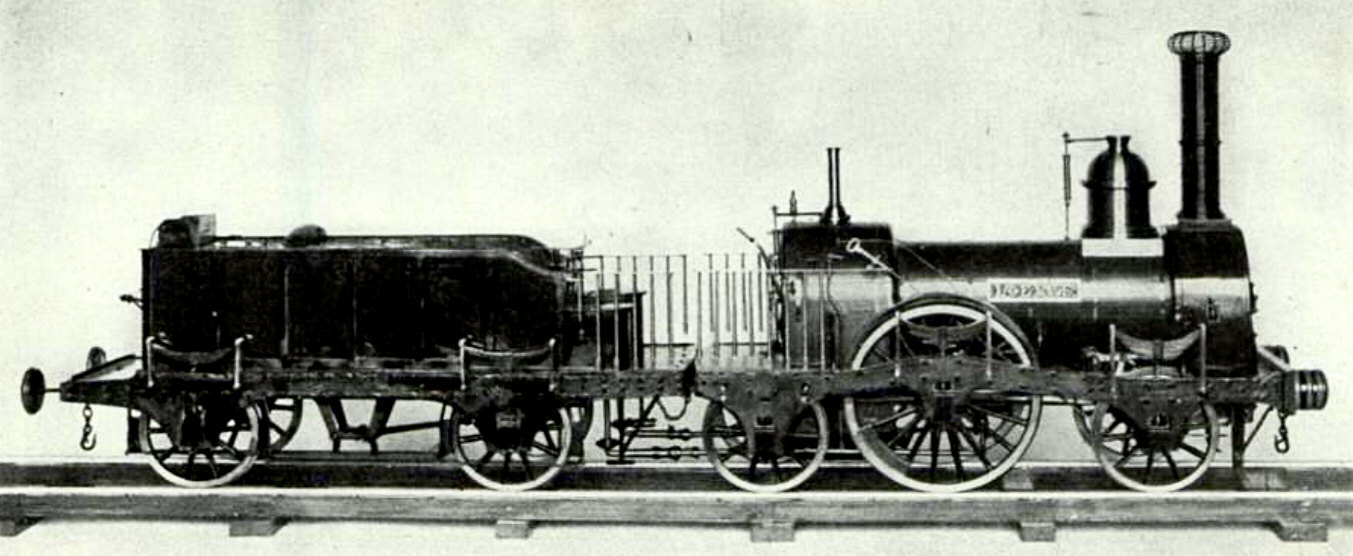
Löwe on the Grand Duchy of Baden State Railway delivered in 1839

This type of locomotive became known as the Sharp single, it became an early standard for express locomotives with around 600 of them being built between 1837 and 1857, they were available with different sized cylinders, driving wheels and tender arrangements, including a well tank version. These locomotives were the company's principal product, they and others like them, were the mainstay of passenger services throughout the country and further afield having been exported to France, Belgium, Holland, Germany, Russia, Italy and Spain.

== Sharp Brothers and Company ==
In 1841 Thomas Sharp died and in 1843 Richard Roberts left the partnership and the firm became Sharp Brothers and Company, Roberts retained the old works and the new locomotive building company moved to the Atlas Works situated on both sides of Bridgewater Street in Manchester. The brothers took on new partners, Thomas Beatt Sharp (son of the late Thomas) and John Robinson (son of a Skipton banker), Beyer became the firm's chief engineer.

Amongst others the company built eight 2-2-2 passenger engines and two 0-4-2 goods engines for the Lynn and Dereham Railway, all of which were delivered between 1846 and 1848. Between 1851 and 1853 the company built twenty 2-2-2 Bloomer class locomotives for the London and North Western Railway.

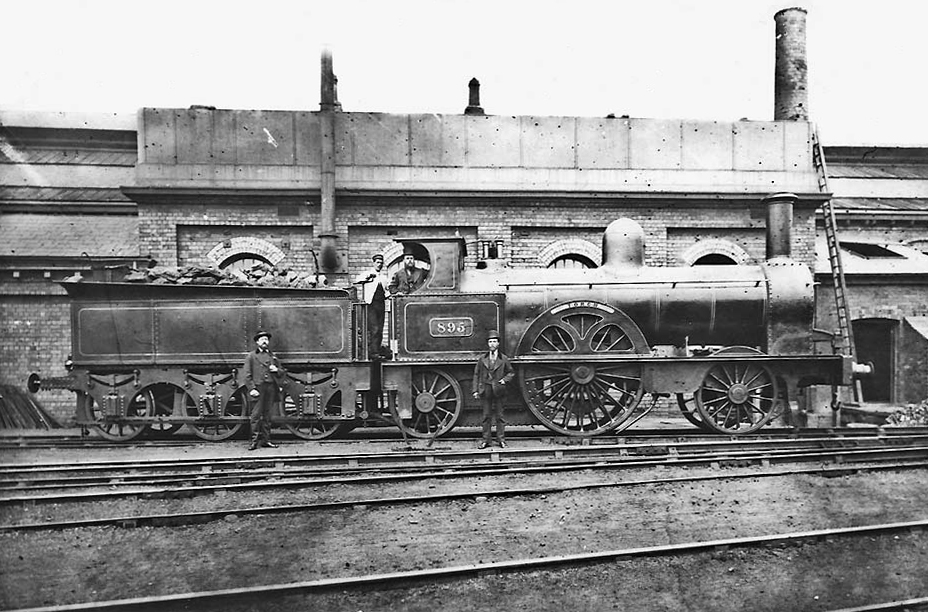
LNWR engine No.895 'Torch', built in 1853

== Sharp, Stewart and Company ==
In 1852, the senior partner, John Sharp, retired and was replaced by Charles Patrick Stewart, the name of the company changing to Sharp, Stewart and Company. Thomas Beatt Sharp also retired shortly thereafter and was succeeded by Stephen Robinson (brother of John Robinson). Shortly after this change Charles Beyer left the firm to co-found Beyer, Peacock and Company

Between 1851 and 1901 the company built 15 types totaling over 100 locomotives for the Furness Railway, one of which No. 20 of 0-4-0 of Furness class 17 built in 1863 has been restored to working order. The locomotive is owned by the Furness Railway Trust.

From 1854 to 1865 the company built 0-6-0 130 Class locomotives for the Midland Railway, Egypt and other railways.

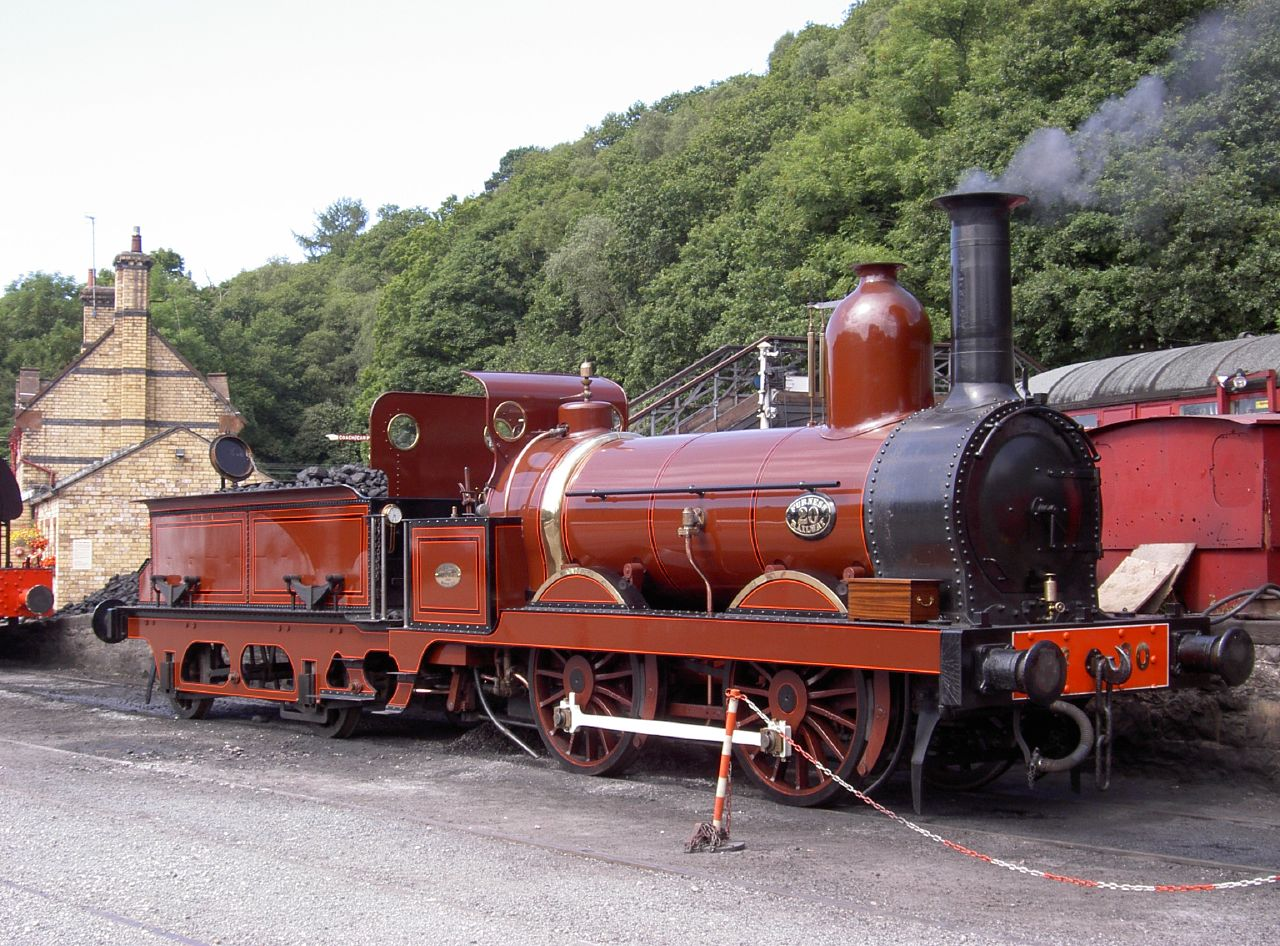
Furness Railway No. 20. Works No. 1448 of 1863

In the early 1850s Henri Giffard invented a steam engine injector which he patented in France in 1858. Giffard then obtained a British patent which the company subsequently secured, they began to manufacture the injector from patterns obtained from M. Giffard, but they soon set out to improve the instrument from experiments carried out.

They tried their injector on a stationary boiler at their works and it was later fitted to a ballast locomotive on the St. Helens Railway, about the middle of 1859. The injector was soon able to displace the feed pump and maintain the water level in the boiler. A larger Giffard injector was then fitted to a goods locomotive on the same railway. Ten injectors were ordered by this railway from Sharp & Stewart. The company then dispensed with pumps altogether on locomotives built for foreign railways. In Great Britain, however, the practice of having one pump and one injector on each locomotive continued for some time. The L&NWR were next to use this new water feed apparatus when John Ramsbottom fitted injectors on some of his " Problem " 2-2-2 type of locomotives during 1860.

From 1862 the company started to build larger locomotives, in 1862 they built the first of three 4-6-0ST locomotives for the Great Indian Peninsula Railway, they were followed in 1865 by a further two locomotives built in 2-6-0ST.

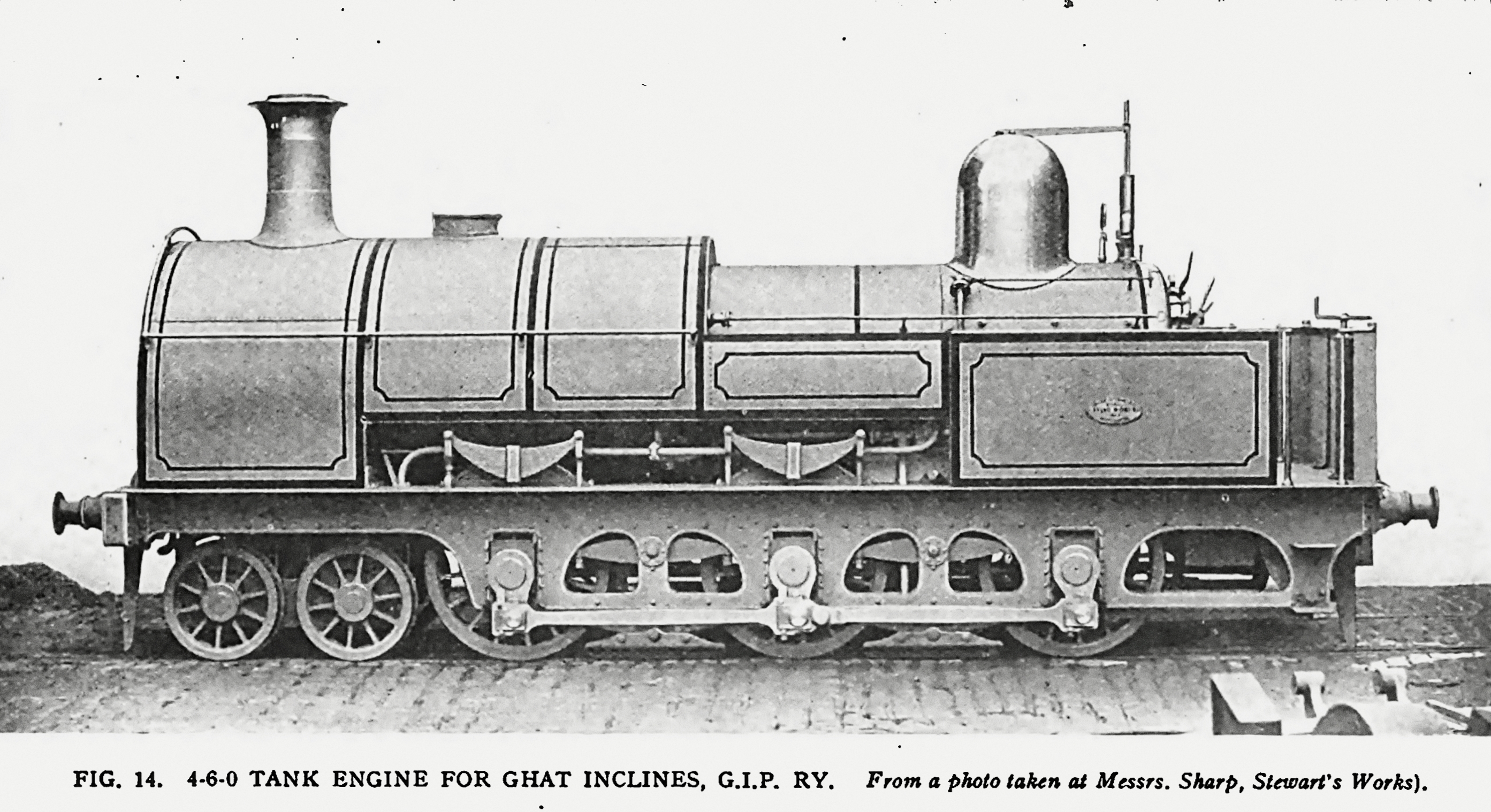
4-6-0 GIPR Tank locomotive works photograph

The company acquired limited liability in 1864 with Charles Patrick Stewart as the first chairman, he remained the chairman until his death in 1882.

== Move to Glasgow ==
Apart from building locomotives the company were also dealing in general brass and iron foundry work, making machine tools and as iron merchants. With a full order book it became necessary to move, which they did in 1888 after the completion of the 3,442nd locomotive at Manchester.

They bought, took over, reorganised and moved into the works of the Clyde Locomotive Company in Springburn, Glasgow, renaming it Atlas Works.John Robinson retired after this move was completed.

The company took over the Clyde company's order book fulfilling orders for 8 locomotives for the Brazilian Government Railway, 6 for the Central Argentine Railway and 2 for the Uruguay Northern Railway.

In 1892–1893 a large order for the Midland Railway was completed, it comprised 20 class 2183 4-4-0s, 15 class 2203 4-4-0s and 40 0-6-0s.

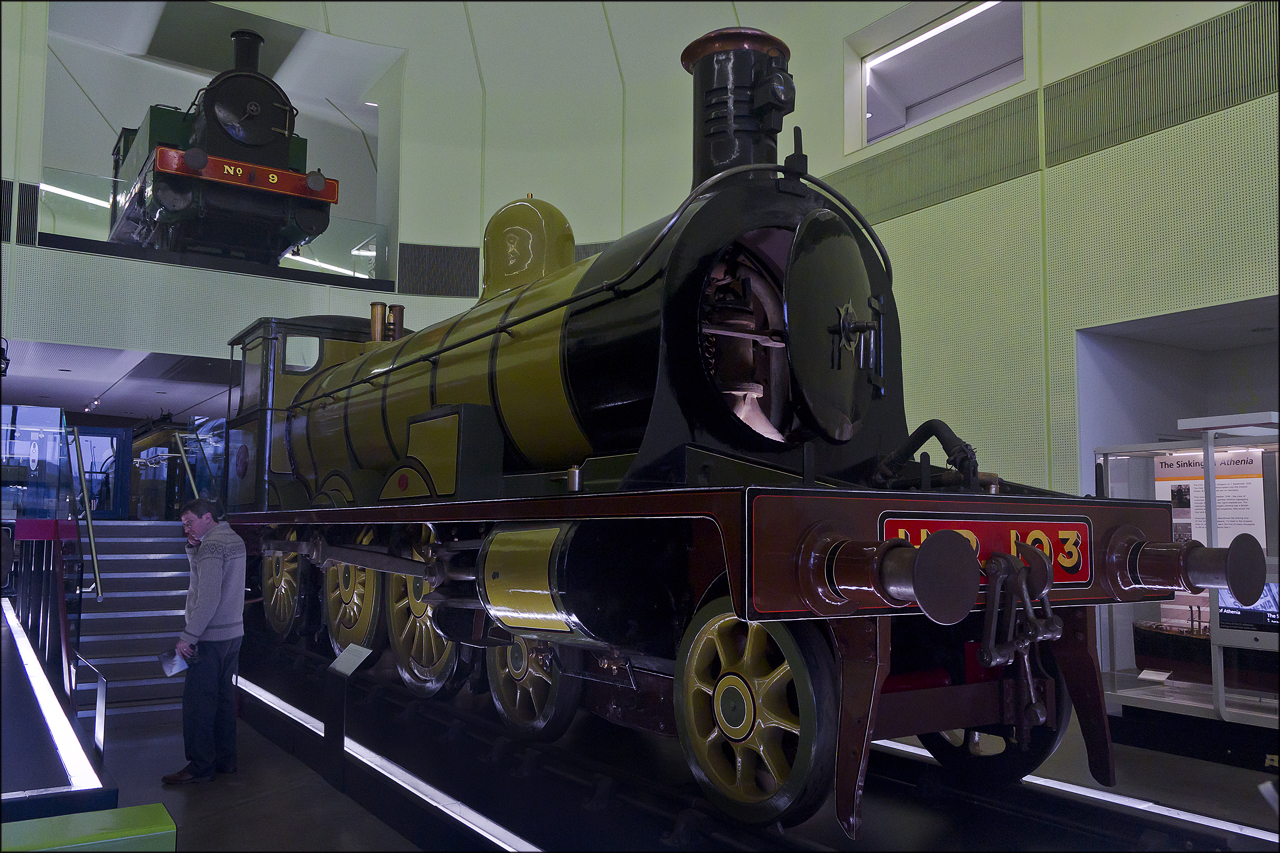
Highland Railway Jones Goods Class No 103

In 1894 the company built the first fifteen 4-6-0 locomotives destined to be used in Great Britain, these were the Highland Railway's Jones Goods Class, whilst intended for freight train use they were often used for passenger duties.

== North British ==
In 1903, having built 5088 engines, the company amalgamated with Neilson, Reid and Company and Dübs and Company to form the North British Locomotive Company.

== See also ==
- Category:Sharp Stewart locomotives

== Bibliography ==
- Baxter, Bertram (1979). Baxter, David (ed.). British Locomotive Catalogue 1825–1923. Vol. 2B: London and North Western Railway and its constituent companies. Ashbourne, Derbyshire: Moorland Publishing Company. ISBN 0-903485-84-2.
- Ellis, Hamilton (1968). The Pictorial Encyclopedia Of Railways. Hamelyn.
- Hills, Richard L.; Patrick, D. (1982). 'Beyer, Peacock: Locomotive Builders to the World. Glossop: Transport Publishing Co. ISBN 0-903839-41-5.
- Jenkins, S. (1993). The Lynn and Dereham Railway. Oakwood Press. ISBN 978-0853614432.
- Lowe, James Wensley (1975). British steam locomotive builders. Leicestershire: TEE Pubishers. ISBN 0-905100-57-3. OCLC 39757689.
- Marshall, John (1978). A Biographical Dictionary of Railway Engineers. David & Charles. ISBN 978-0-7153-7489-4.
- Ross, David (2005). The Highland Railway. Stroud: Tempus. ISBN 9780752434797. OCLC 219967913.
- Shields, T.H. (25 October 1950). "Giffard Centenary - A Study Of Locomotive Injector Development". Institution of Mechanical Engineers (498): 597–673.
- Weaver, Rodney (1997). "injector, locomotive". In Simmons, Jack; Biddle, Gordon (eds.). The Oxford Companion to British Railway History From 1603 to the 1990s (1st ed.). Oxford: Oxford University Press. pp. 222–223. ISBN 0-19-211697-5.
