= DWWR Ariel Class =

Dublin, Wicklow and Wexford Railway 2-2-2WT locomotive introduced in 1865

DW&WR Ariel et al.
Type and origin
- Power type: Steam
- Builder: Neilson & Co.
- Serial number: 1122–1127, 1144
- Build date: 1865
Specifications
- Configuration
  - Whyte: 2-2-2WT
- Gauge: 5 ft 3 in (1,600 mm)
- Driver dia.: 5 ft 6 in (1,680 mm)
- Frame type: single
- Loco weight: 19 long tons (19 t)
- Fuel type: Coal
- Boiler pressure: 120 lbf/in^{2} (0.83 MPa)
- Cylinders: 2
- Cylinder size: 14 in × 20 in (356 mm × 508 mm)
Career
- Operators: DW&WR
- Number in class: 7
- Locale: Ireland
- Withdrawn: 1895

The Dublin, Wicklow and Wexford Railway (DW&WR) Ariel Class (Note: Ariel Class is not an official name but a convenient mechanism for referring to the class. The DW&WR in common with most Irish railway companies of the nineteenth century did not formally designate locomotive classes.) refers to seven 2-2-2WT well tank locomotives built by Neilson and Company and introduced in 1865.

== Ordering ==
In 1864 S. W. Haughton retired as locomotive superintendent of the DW&WR indicating the stress of maintenance of the 30 engines of the DW&WR as a factor, the workload being much greater than in 1849 when he had begun that role for the Dublin and Kingstown Railway (D&KR). (Note: At the D&KR in 1849 he also had other responsibilities) His replacement, William Meikle, who himself was to retire with ill-heath within the year faced a pressing need to replace the ageing locomotives in use on the Westland Row to Kingstown and Bray services. (Note: These would have been drawn from the 11 2-2-2T tank engines passed from the D&KR in 1856, the four 20 ton locomotives of the Burgoyne class and the remainder based on the tank rebuild of the original Vauxhall engine.)

Meikle had six tenders for the supply of between six and eight locomotives with Grendon of Drogheda quoting the highest at £2,000 per unit. Neilson and Company won with the cheapest quote of £1,564 and initially supplied six locomotives in 1965. A seventh added at a later date seems to be related to Banshee being exhibited at the 1865 Dublin International Exhibition of Arts and Manufactures. (Note: Banshee appears to have been exhibited at the exhibition as a DW&WR locomotive according to the catalogue whilst Murray says it was adopted by the DW&WR afterwards. Neilson had an adjacent stand at the exhibition displaying photographs of their locomotives)

The engines were given the name of "supernatural personages": Ariel; Elfin; Kate Kearney; (Note: Became known as Kate for short) Kelpie; Oberon; Titania; and Banshee.

== Design ==
The locomotives used coal as fuel, as opposed to the earliest D&KR engines which burned coke. They had straight weatherboards and were noted for a generous proportion of brass and copper-topped chimneys. Known to be painted green in the 1870s they were later painted is what was described as "ugly red" and modified with the fitting of cabs and stove-pipe chimneys.

Murray notes the low power design was little better than the prior Burgoyne class.

== Service ==
External image
- DW&WR Ariel Class
- Neilson Locomotive Banshee, the one which appeared in the 1865 Dublin exhibition, in photographic livery Retrieved 18 October 2019

They were designed for the Westland Row to Bray coastal commuter route where they operated almost for the majority of their lifetime. Unusually for DW&WR locomotives they bore names rather than numbers though this was consistent practice with the previous practice on the D&KR section for which they were designed.

Ariel was noted as the first to operate over the Dublin Loop Line to Amiens Street and last to be withdrawn.

In an incident at Bray Banshee suffered a burst boiler killing both the fireman and driver. The locomotive was repaired and was sold to Fisher and Le Fanu. Oberton and Elfin went to Murphy's Brewery possibly at Bantry and Baltimore respectively.

Murray suggests with their relatively short life and low power they were not a satisfactory investment perhaps evidenced by the fact none were rebuilt and Shepherds almost notes they were likely not successful.
