= 2-2-0 =

Locomotive wheel arrangement

2-2-0 (Planet)
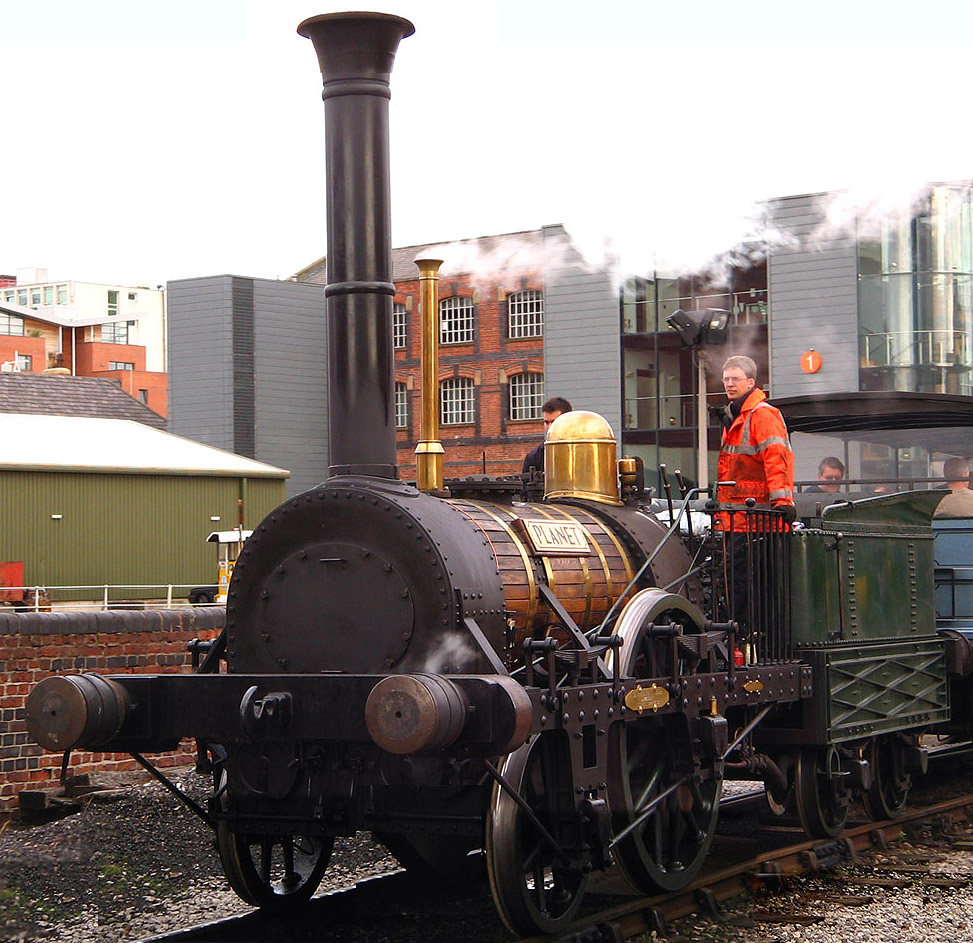
- Replica of the Planet at the Manchester Science Museum
Equivalent classifications
- UIC class: 1A
- French class: 110
- Turkish class: 12
- Swiss class: 1/2
- Russian class: 1-1-0
First known tender engine version
- First use: 1830
- Country: United Kingdom
- Locomotive: Planet
- Railway: Liverpool and Manchester Railway
- Designer: Robert Stephenson
- Drawbacks: Worse adhesion without coupled wheels

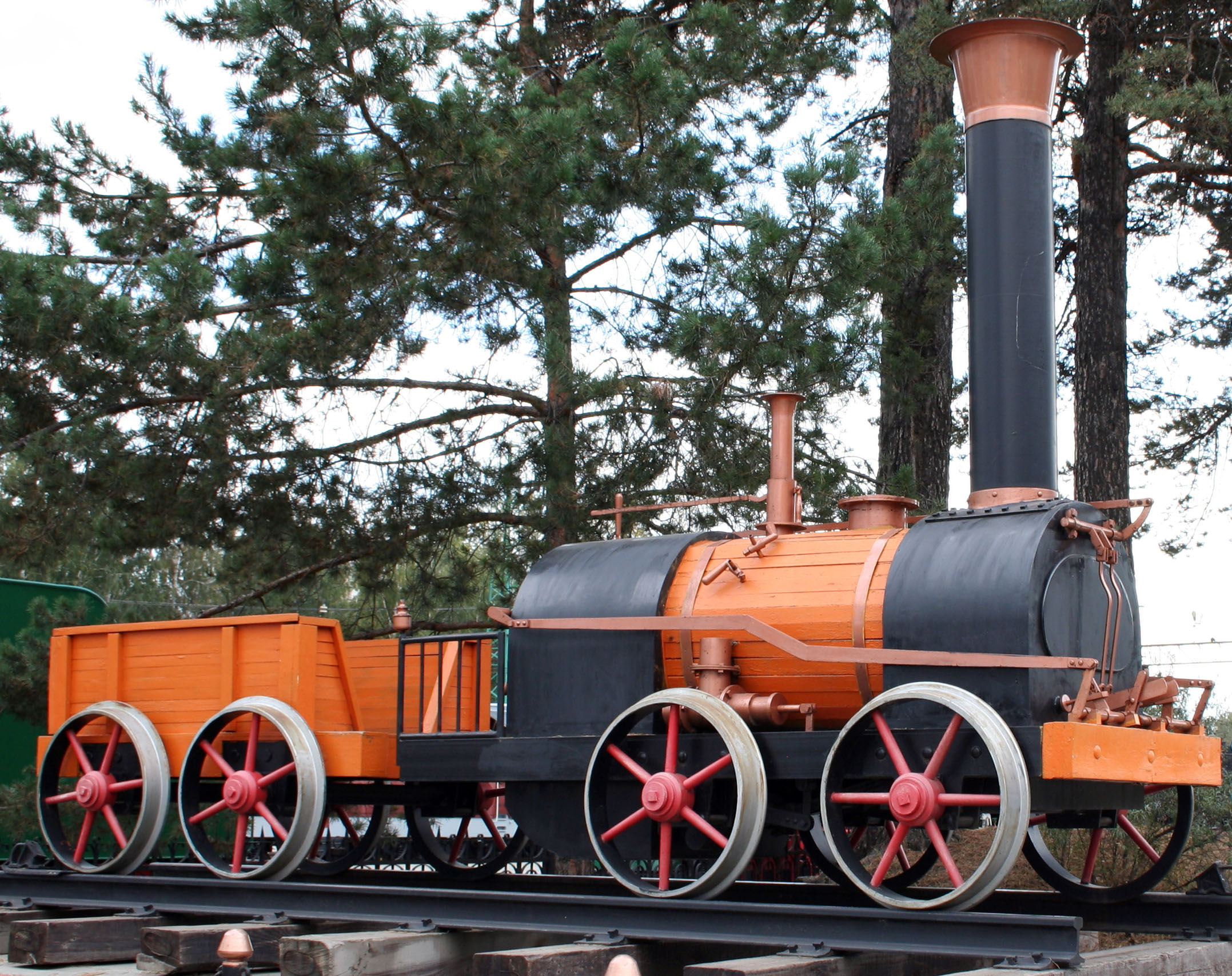
Model (2002) of the steam locomotive constructed in Russia by the Cherepanovs (1834)

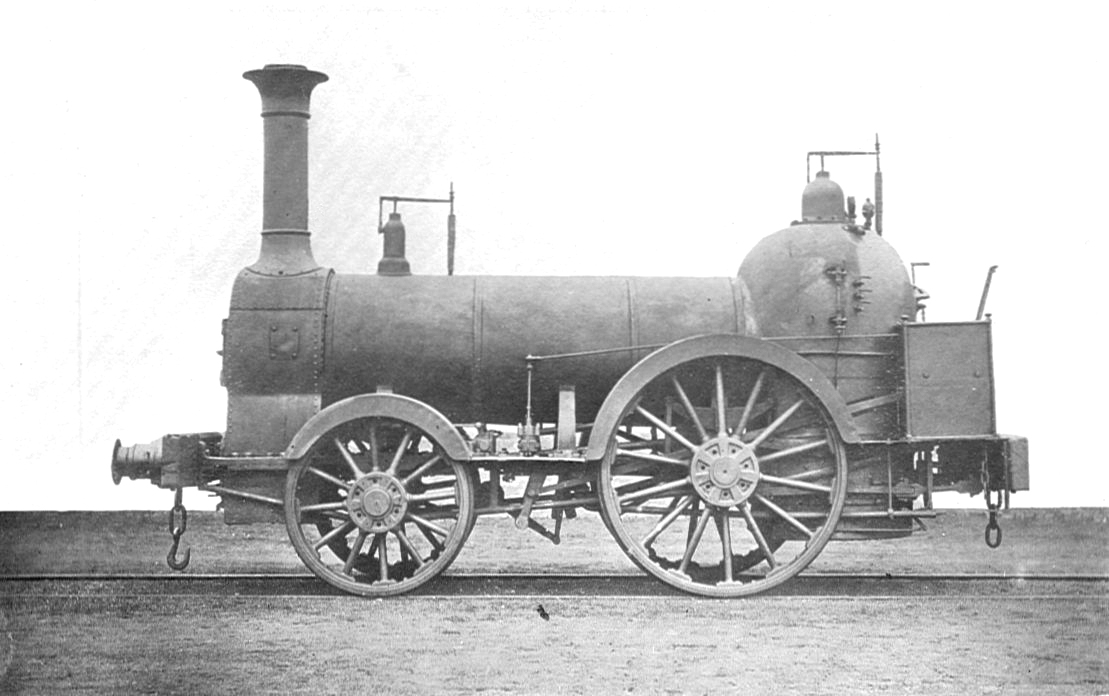
Bury 2-2-0 for the London and Birmingham Railway

Under the Whyte notation for the classification of steam locomotives, 2-2-0 represents the wheel arrangement of two leading wheels on one axle, followed by two powered driving wheels on one axle, and no trailing wheels. This configuration, which became very popular during the 1830s, was commonly called the Planet type after the first locomotive, Robert Stephenson's Planet of 1830.

== Equivalent classifications ==
Other equivalent classifications are:

- UIC classification: 1A (also known as German classification and Italian classification)
- French classification: 110
- Turkish classification: 12
- Swiss classification: 1/2

== History ==
=== Great Britain ===
After early experience with the 0-2-2 configuration on the Liverpool and Manchester Railway, Robert Stephenson decided to build a locomotive with cylinders inside the frames, for which a 2-2-0 was preferable. The first such locomotive was Planet, built in 1830 and the company went on to build a further eighteen examples for the railway. In 1835 five examples were supplied to the London and Greenwich Railway. After 1836 Edward Bury built sixty-nine bar frame 2-2-0 locomotives for the London and Birmingham Railway. The steam roller and traction engine company Aveling and Porter built a number of 2-2-0 locomotives, some of which were convertible traction engines.

=== North America ===
Tom Thumb, the first American-built steam locomotive used on a common-carrier railroad, built by Peter Cooper in 1830 was a gear-driven 2-2-0, but the type was not perpetuated.

=== Ireland ===
The Dublin and Kingstown Railway used 2-2-0 in 1834 including Hibernia designed by Richard Roberts and built by Sharp, Roberts and Company, and Vauxhall built George Forrester and Company.

=== Russia ===
The first Russian-built steam locomotive was a 2-2-0 built by the Cherepanovs (father and son) in 1833-1834.

== Decline of the 2-2-0 ==
By 1840 the 2-2-0 tender type had largely been superseded by the 2-2-2 configuration. However, there are a few examples of later tank engines, thus William Bridges Adams of the Fairfield Locomotive Works (51°31′52″N 0°01′19″W) in Bow supplied a 2-2-0 well tank to the Roman Railway in 1850. Also Dugald Drummond of the London and South Western Railway introduced his C14 class 2-2-0T in 1906, for Auto trains, but this design was not successful and several of the locomotives were rebuilt to 0-4-0.

== Preserved examples and Replicas ==
Location	Address	Railroad	Road number/Name	Track gauge	builder	Year(s) built	Notes
Science and Industry Museum	Manchester, England,	Liverpool and Manchester Railway	no.9 Planet	4 ft 8 1/2 in (1,435 mm)	the Friends of the Museum of Science and Industry	1992	A working Replica of the original
Shelburne Museum	Shelburne, Vermont	Philadelphia, Germantown and Norristown Railroad	Old Ironsides	4 ft 8 1/2 in (1,435 mm)	Baldwin Locomotive Works	1893	Replica of the original Old Ironsides Built by the Baldwin Locomotive Works in 1832
National Museum of Railroad History & Innovation	Baltimore, Maryland	Baltimore and Ohio Railroad	Tom Thumb	4 ft 8 1/2 in (1,435 mm)	Baltimore and Ohio Railroad Mount Clare shops,	1927	Replica of the Tom Thumb locomtive
