= D&KR Princess Class =

Early Irish steam locomotive class

Princess
Type and origin
- Power type: Steam
- Designer: Richard Pim
- Builder: Grand Canal Street
- Build date: 1841
- Total produced: 5 or 6 (Note: Six includes the Comet rebuild of 1851)
Specifications
- Configuration
  - Whyte: 2-2-2WT
- Gauge: 4 ft 8 1/2 in (1,435 mm); 5 ft 3 in (1,600 mm) (c.1856)
- Driver dia.: 5 ft 0 in (1,520 mm) (Note: Lowe (2014), p. 138 claims 5 ft 0 in (1,520 mm))
- Loco weight: 20 long tons (20 t)
- Fuel type: Coke
- Fuel capacity: 20 long hundredweight (1,000 kg; 2,200 lb)
- Water cap.: 340 imp gal (1,500 L; 410 US gal)
- Boiler
  - Type: Domeless
- Boiler pressure: (Note: Boiler pressure unknown but within range 50 lbf/in^{2} (0.34 MPa) to 90 lbf/in^{2} (0.62 MPa))
- Cylinders: 2
- Cylinder size: 12 in × 18 in (305 mm × 457 mm)
- Couplers: Bergin
Career
- Operators: Dublin and Kingstown Railway; Dublin and Wicklow Railway; Dublin, Wicklow and Wexford Railway
- Number in class: 5 or 6

Princess was the class lead for a set of five locomotives built by the Dublin and Kingstown Railway (D&KR) in their own Grand Canal Street works from 1841. Princess was both the first locomotive built in Ireland and the first locomotive to be completed by a railway company in the British Isles in their own workshops.

== History ==
By the 1840s, some of the D&KRs original nine locomotives were becoming life expired, difficult to maintain with Star unusable and those from Sharp's unable to be converted to tank locomotives. In common with other railways such as the Liverpool and Manchester Railway (L&MR) it was found the cost of buying locomotives from independent manufacturers had become extremely expensive and enough expertise had been gathered in the company's own workshops to construct locomotives themselves.

In August 1840, locomotive superintendent Richard Pim was authorised to construct a locomotive using parts from the scrapped Star locomotive. The design was heavily based on those previously supplied by George Forrester and Company but using trailing axle 2-2-2WT configuration. Princess completed and tested on 3 April 1841. In the event few parts from Star were used, but the cost of £1,050 14s 5d. compared well with the £1,000 cost of the previous locomotive from Forresters.

The second of the class, Bellisle, did use parts of Star, entered service in August 1841, with a build cost of £749 1s 0d including £378 10s 8d labour. Three sister engines were then built in parallel, emerging from between November 1842 and July 1844 as Shamrock, Erin and Albert, the average cost of £853 being markedly less than the estimated £1400 from an external supplier.

The design was eventually found to be under powered for the D&KR's increasing needs and the 1845 Burgoyne engines were a more powerful evolvement of the design.

=== Dalkey Atmospheric Railway ===
When the Dalkey Atmospheric Railway, also operated by the D&KR, had a long breakdown in 1848 and Princess was modified to operate the section with a reduced chimney and temporary canopy to protect the engine crew from the very low loading gauge. Princess proved capable of operating with four carriages on the heavily graded section for a couple of months.

== Fleet ==
Name	Introduced	Rebuilt 5' 3"	Withdrawn	Notes
Princess	1841	1856	1884	Named in honour of Victoria the Princess Royal, first locomotive built in Ireland, first in world built in railway company workshop, Modified in 1848 with cab cover and reduced chimney to work over Dalkey Atmospheric Railway section.
Belleisle	1841	1856	1864–1872	
Shamrock	1842	1856	1864–1872	
Erin	1843	1856	1864–1872	
Albert	1844	1856	1874	Named in honour of Albert, Prince Consort
Comet	1851	1856	1864–1872	Heavy rebuild from Forrester Comet of 1835
