= Robert Baugh =

Welsh engraver, map-maker and surveyor

Robert Baugh (1748 – 27 December 1832) was a Welsh surveyor, copper-plate engraver, map-maker and print-maker.

== Early life ==
Robert Baugh, the son of Christiana and Robert Baugh, was born in 1748 in Llandysilio, near Llanymynech, and was baptised at Llanymynech church on 2 May 1749.

== Career ==
John Evans's map of North Wales (1795) was engraved by Baugh. In 1809, the Royal Society of Arts in London awarded him a fifteen guineas and a silver medal for his map of Shropshire, which was noted for sharp engraved lines and accuracy. He was also a draughtsman and a surveyor, for area aqueduct and road projects. He also worked for Thomas Telford and Stevenson on the Ellesmere Canal.

He was the parish clerk and church warden of the Llanymynech church for many years. The church has several brass plates made by Baugh, hung on its north wall.

== Personal life ==
He married Catherine Edwards of Carreghofa on 25 May 1782 and lived in Llwyn-tidman, just east of Llanymynech. Their children included Susanna, Catherine, Robert and Margaret.

Baugh died near Llanymynech on 27 December 1832, aged 84.
