= Isaac Dodds and Son =

Early English locomotive manufacturer

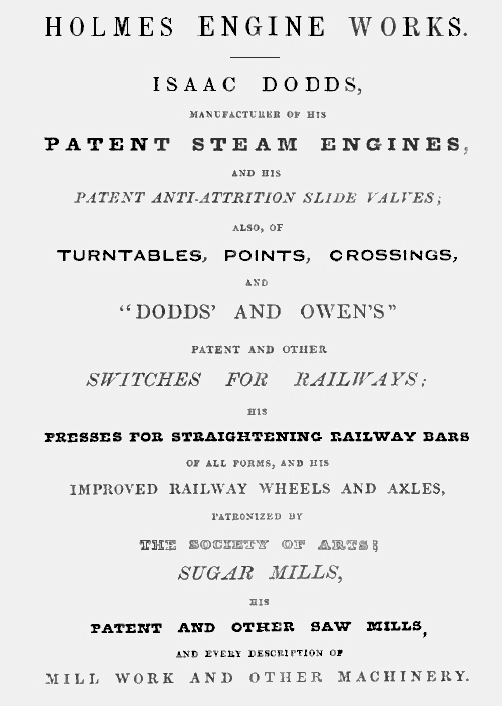
Advertisement for Isaac Dodd's Engine Works at Holmes from Drake's Road Book of the Sheffield and Rotherham Railway, 1840.

Isaac Dodds and Son was a locomotive manufacturer based in the Holmes district of Rotherham, South Yorkshire, England. Isaac Dodds took over part of the works of Samuel Walker and Company in Rotherham sometime while he was Superintendent of the Sheffield and Rotherham Railway. It is likely, therefore, that he used it to maintain the company's locomotives, or even build new ones. There, however, seems to be no record.

== History ==
Isaac Dodds was born on 9 July 1801 at Felling Hall, County Durham. His father Thomas was manager of the Felling Colliery and died when Isaac was four at the Hebburn Colliery. The local parish clerk, Willie Woolhave, (Note: There are suggestions Woolhave may have claims to the instigator of the concepts that lead to the Clammy Safety lamp and Henry Greathead's lifeboat.) contributed greatly to his schooling with Isaac showing aptitude for mathematics and drawing. About 1813 aged 12 Isaac was apprenticed as a mining engineer by his uncle Ralph Dodds and Killingworth Colliery. When George Stephenson joined Killingworth around 1815 and joint patented a Steam engine with Ralph it appears young Isaac built a model of said engine and his use of coupling rods rather than gears was adopted by Ralph and George for their engine.

In 1832 Isaac Dodds started duties with the Horsley Iron Company, with his winning design resulting in the 1833 locomotive Star. He retired from the Ironworks in 1836 when an accident there caused him to lose his right eye.

Isaac Dodds set up the Holmes Engine and Railway Works by buying the candle and soap factory of Messrs. Dodd and Layton.

=== Locomotives ===
The first locomotive known about is an 0-4-2 named Fitzwilliam in 1849 for the South Yorkshire Railway. The firm produced around seventy locomotives in all. One, a 2-4-0 named Ysabel was tried out on the Lickey Incline in 1853, with some success, though none appear to have been ordered.

The largest order would seem to be twelve 2-4-0 locomotives for the Isabel II Railway, Spain, in 1856. For whatever reason, these were not paid for, which could hardly have been good for the company's finances.

=== Liquidation ===
In 1866, the company quoted for the London, Brighton and South Coast Railway and received an order for two. The required delivery time of three months could not be met and by 1867 the firm was in liquidation. Though the order had been cancelled, work had already started and the two engines were completed for the LB&SCR by the official receiver, and they finally ran in 1871.

=== Innovations ===
Dodds was known for his patented wedge valve gear. In 1839 Isaac Dodds was the first to fix the boiler at the smokebox end only which allowed for boiler expansion.
