= Richard Roberts (engineer) =

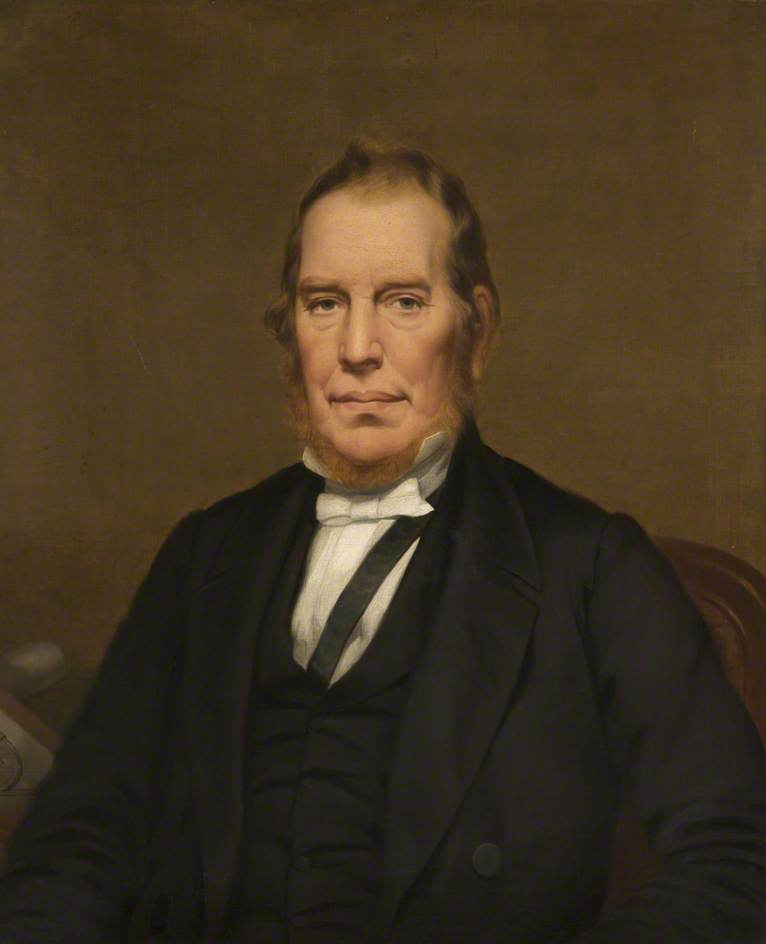
- by Edward Villiers Rippingille
- Born: 22 April 1789; Llanymynech, United Kingdom
- Died: 11 March 1864 (aged 74); London, United Kingdom
- Resting place: Kensal Green Cemetery
- Occupation: Engineer
- Known for: Machine tools

Richard Roberts (22 April 1789 – 11 March 1864) was a Welsh patternmaker and engineer whose development of high-precision machine tools contributed to the birth of production engineering and mass production.

== Early life ==
Roberts was born at Llanymynech, Powys, on the border between England and Wales. He was the son of William Roberts, a shoemaker who also kept the New Bridge tollgate. Roberts was educated by the parish priest and early found employment with a boatman on the Ellesmere Canal and later at the local limestone quarries. He received some instruction in drawing from Robert Baugh, a road surveyor, who was working under Thomas Telford.

Roberts then found employment as a patternmaker at Bradley Iron works, Staffordshire and, probably in 1813, moved to a supervisory position in the pattern shop of the Horseley Ironworks, Tipton. He had gained skills in turning, wheel-wrighting and the repair of millwork. He was drawn for the militia and to avoid this made for Liverpool, but finding no work there he shifted to Manchester, where he found work as a turner for a cabinet-maker. He then moved to Salford working at lathe- and tool-making.

Because the militia was still seeking him, he walked to London where he found employment with Henry Maudslay as a fitter and turner. At Maudslay's he absorbed his master's philosophy of "the importance of accurate machine tools where hand-work was replaced by mechanisms".

By 1816, when defeat of Napoleon had removed the threat of the militia, it was safe for him to return north, he had set up at Manchester as a "turner of plain and eccentric work at No 15 Deans Gate". The lathe was upstairs in a bedroom, driven by a big wheel in the basement turned by his wife. Roberts soon moved into New Market Buildings at Pool Fold, and was described as a "Lathe and Tool Maker".

Roberts was elected to membership of the Manchester Literary and Philosophical Society on 18 January 1823. He was, with other members of the Society, a founder of The Mechanics' Institute in Manchester.

== Machine tools ==
Roberts built a range of machine tools, some to his own design, the first being a gear-cutting machine. For checking the dimensions of the gears he adapted the sector, which he developed for sale to other engineers. Roberts adopted rotary cutters, which he had seen used at Maudslays. This is one of the earliest records of a milling cutter used in engineering. In 1816 he made the first reliable wet gas meter. In 1817 he made a lathe able to turn work 6 ft long (1.8 m). This had a back gear to give an increased range of speeds and a sliding saddle to move the tool along the work; the saddle was driven by a screw through gearing which could be disengaged when the end of the cut was reached. Also in 1817 he built a planing machine to allow the machining of flat surfaces. Previous to this, flat surfaces were laboriously made by hand with the fitter using hammers and chisels, files and scrapers to get a true surface.

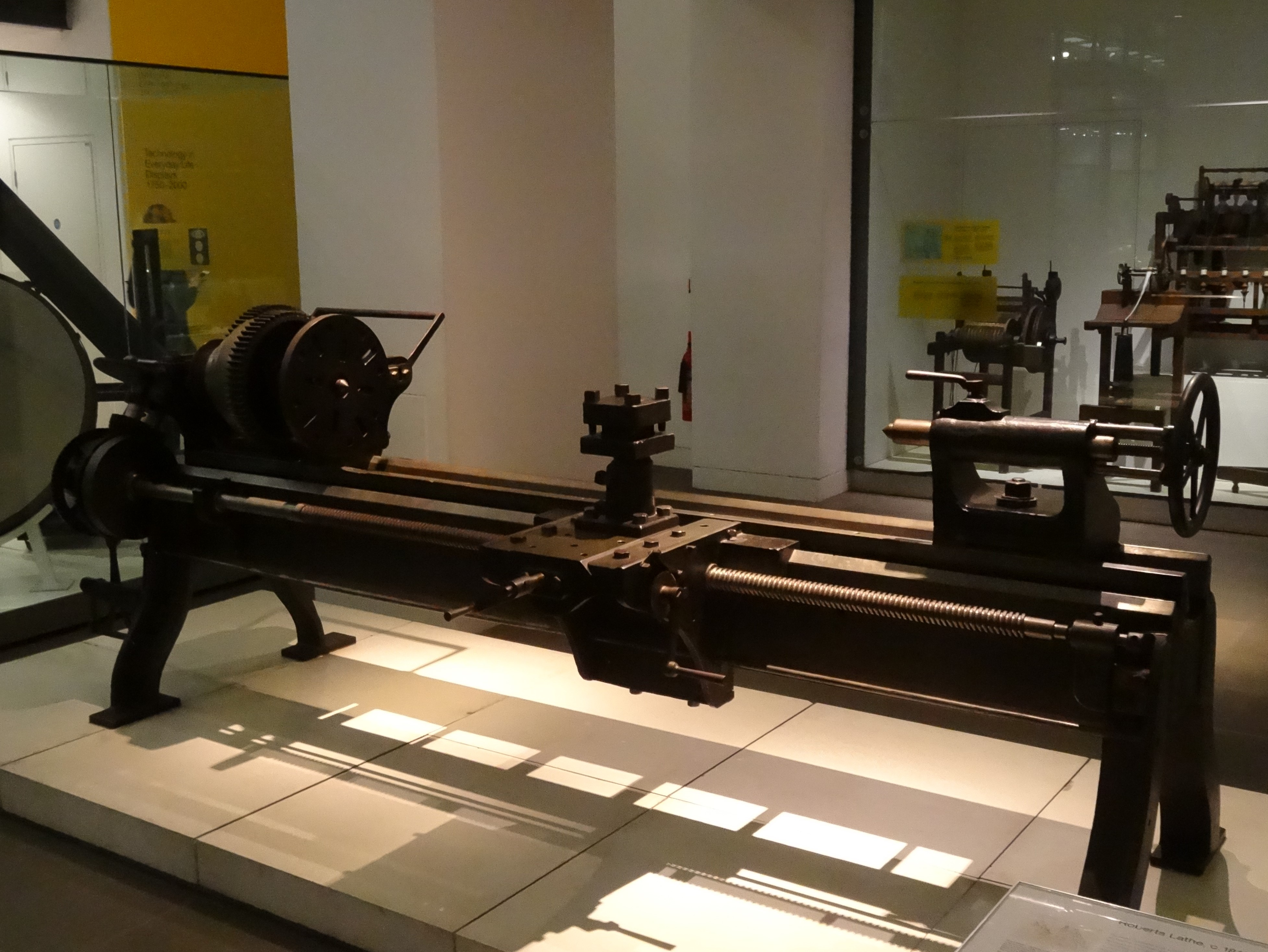
Roberts' lathe at the Science Museum in London

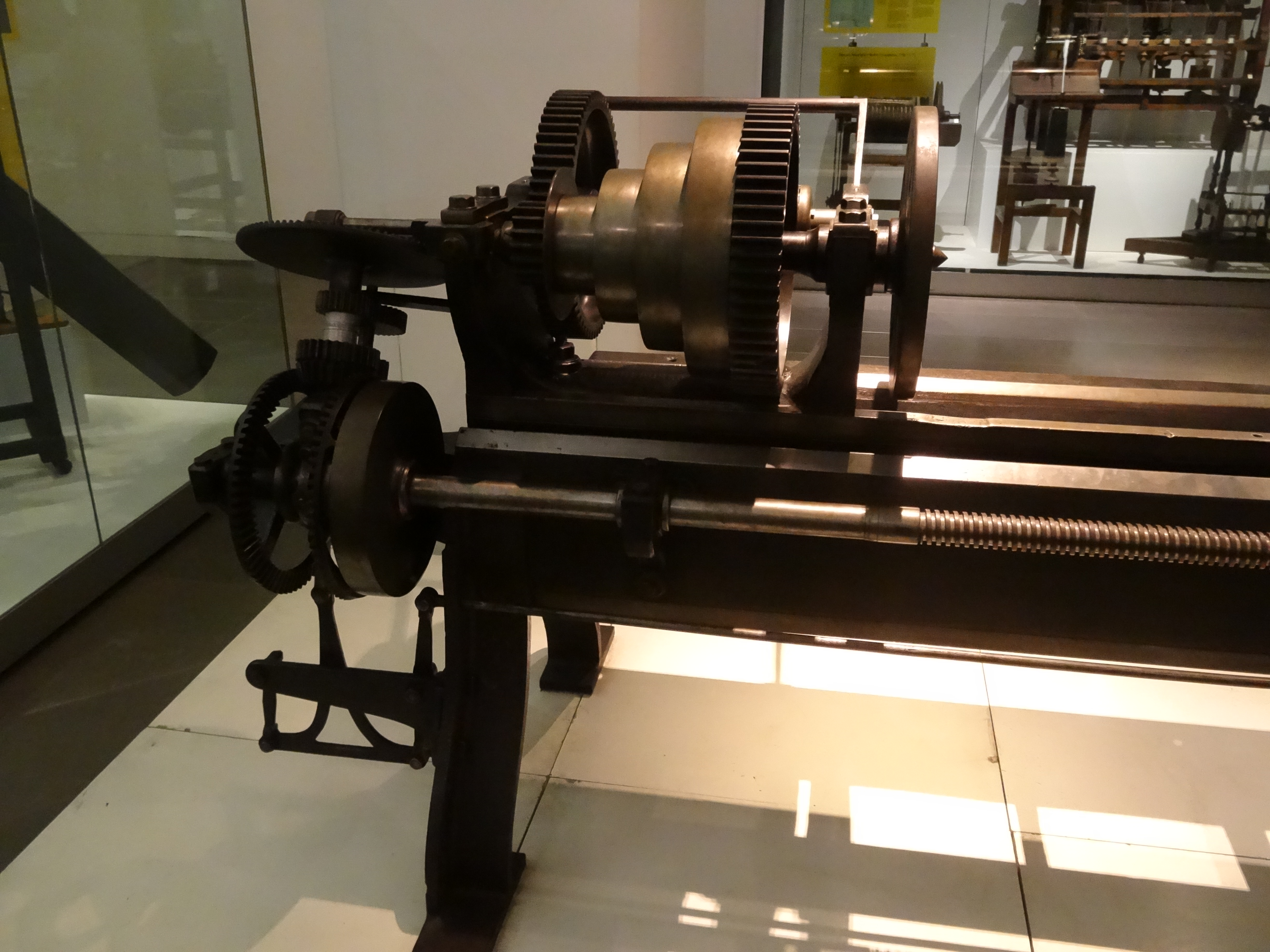

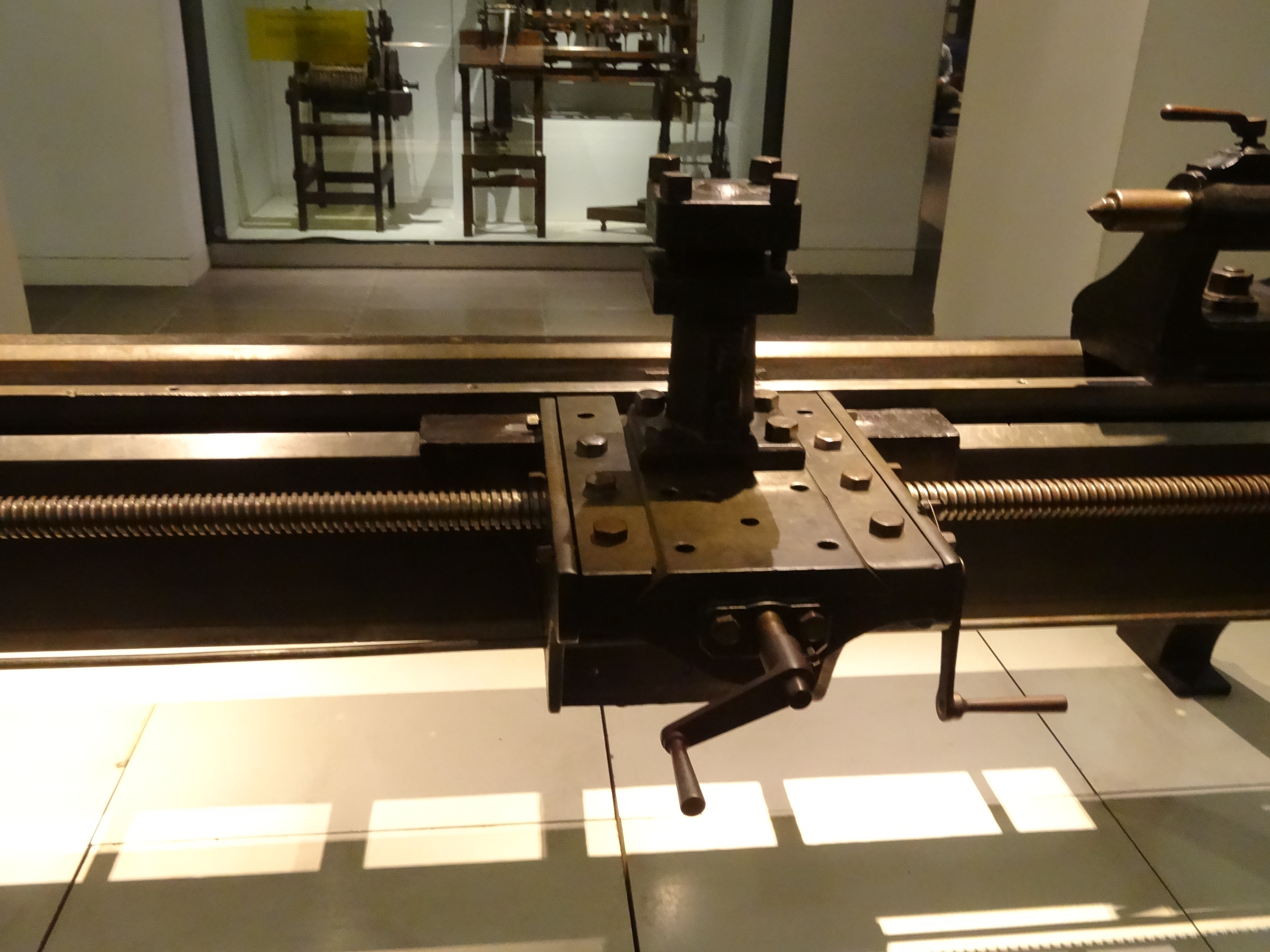

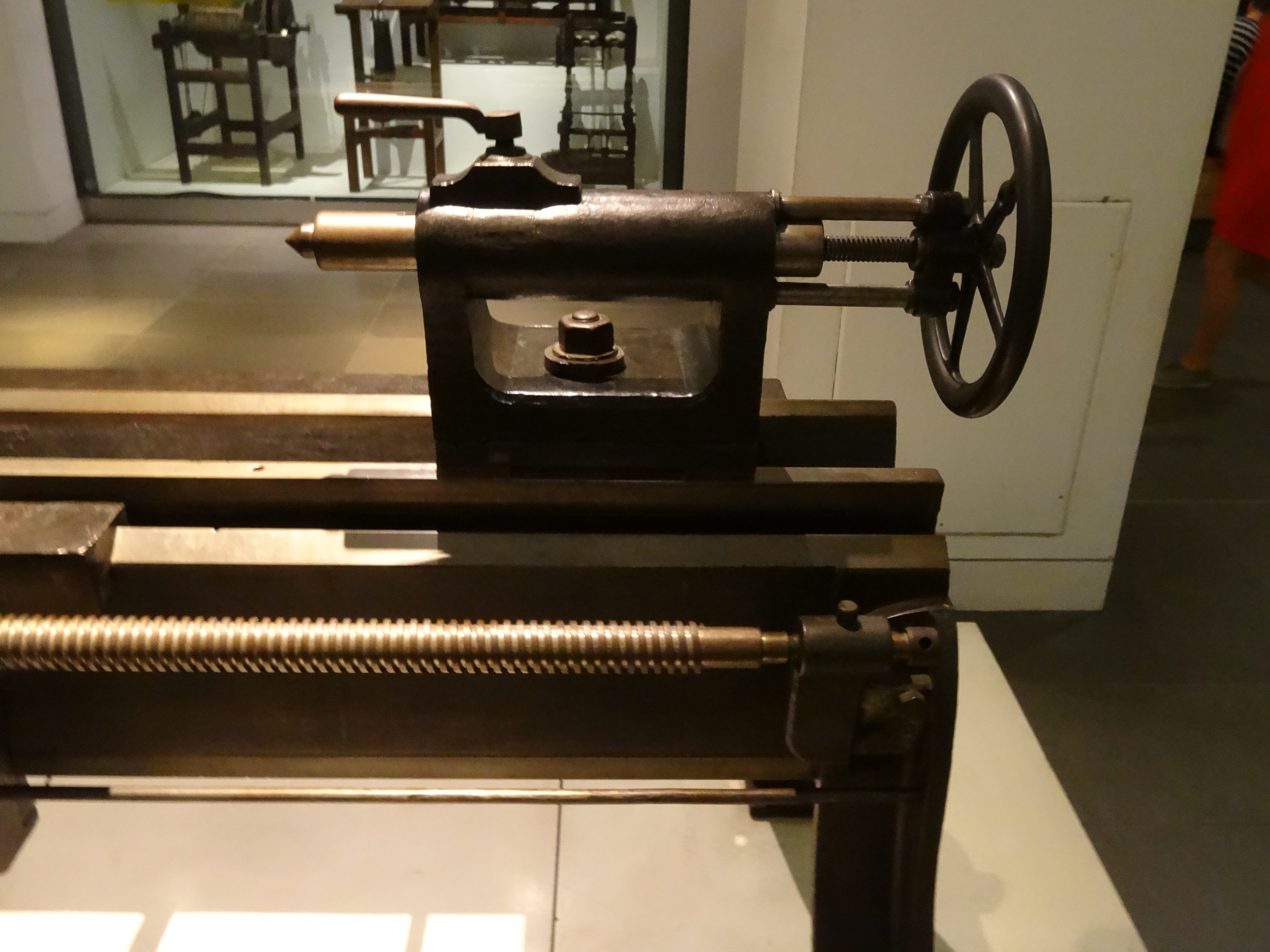

Following the success of his power loom, in 1825 he invented a slotting machine to cut keyways in gears and pulleys to fasten them to their shafts. Previously this was done by hand chipping and filing. The tool was reciprocated vertically, and by adopting Maudslay's slide rest principle, he made the work table with a universal movement, both straight line and rotary so that the sides of complex pieces could be machined. Later, he developed the shaping machine, where the cutting tool was reciprocated horizontally over the work, which could be moved in all directions by means of screw-driven slides. Examples of his machine tools, including the oldest existing metal planer, are in the collections of the National Museum of Science and Industry, London.

Roberts also manufactured and sold sets of stocks and dies to his range of pitches, so other engineers could cut threads on nuts and bolts and other machine parts. Roberts' inventions had a seminal influence on other machine-tool engineers, including Joseph Whitworth when he came to Manchester a decade later.

== Textile machines ==
Roberts moved his business in 1821, to the Globe Works in Faulkner Street. Whilst there he improved a reed-making machine, originally invented by the American Jeptha Avery Wilkinson, and in 1822 he patented a power loom. This was made entirely of iron and being precision-made was able to operate at high speed. They were turned out at the rate of 4,000 per year by 1825. In 1824 he invented his most famous machine, the self-acting spinning mule, and patented it in March 1825. These were made in hundreds, and Roberts made extensive use of templates and gauges to standardise production. By 1826 he was working in Mulhouse, Alsace with Koechlin & Co where he contributed to the building of textile machinery for the French cotton industry.

== Sharp, Roberts & Co. ==
When developing his textiles machines, Roberts took as partners Thomas Sharp, an iron merchant, and his brother John Sharp, Robert Chapman, Thomas Jones Wilkinson and James Hill. They formed two firms, Sharp Hill & Co and Roberts, Hills & Co, and in May 1826 these were amalgamated to form Sharp, Roberts & Co. The firm later became well known for making locomotives. In 1834 Charles Beyer joined the firm and contributed to its success in locomotive building as Roberts soon delegated most of the locomotive design work to Beyer.

Roberts was a prolific inventor and manufacturer, ranging over turret clock-making, to road vehicles, to iron ship building, to a punching machine, operating on the same system as the Jacquard loom, for punching the rivet holes in the iron plates making up the railway bridge over the river Conwy in North Wales.

His Alpha turret clock won a prize medal at the Great Exhibition of 1851. He was not a particularly successful businessman, and Sharp, Roberts & Co. closed in June 1852 (by which time the more successful Sharp, Stewart and Company were formed).

== Death and legacy ==
Roberts continued as a consulting engineer and inventor until his death, taking out 18 patents. In 1860, aged 71, he moved to London, where he became financially distressed. Various friends, almost all engineers, raised a fund to help him, but he died in his daughter's arms in London on 11 March 1864, aged 74. He was buried at Kensal Green Cemetery, London. His daughter later received a civil list pension in recognition of her father's achievements.

He has been described as the most important British mechanical engineer of the 19th century. According to biographer Richard Leslie Hills, his main contribution was the introduction of improved machine tools, without which high standards of accuracy could not be achieved. This laid the foundation of production engineering as we know it today, leading to the interchangeability of standard parts and mass production. The Roberts mechanism, a linkage for generating approximate straight-line movement, is named after him.
