= Dublin and Kingstown Railway =

Ireland's first passenger railway (1834–1856)

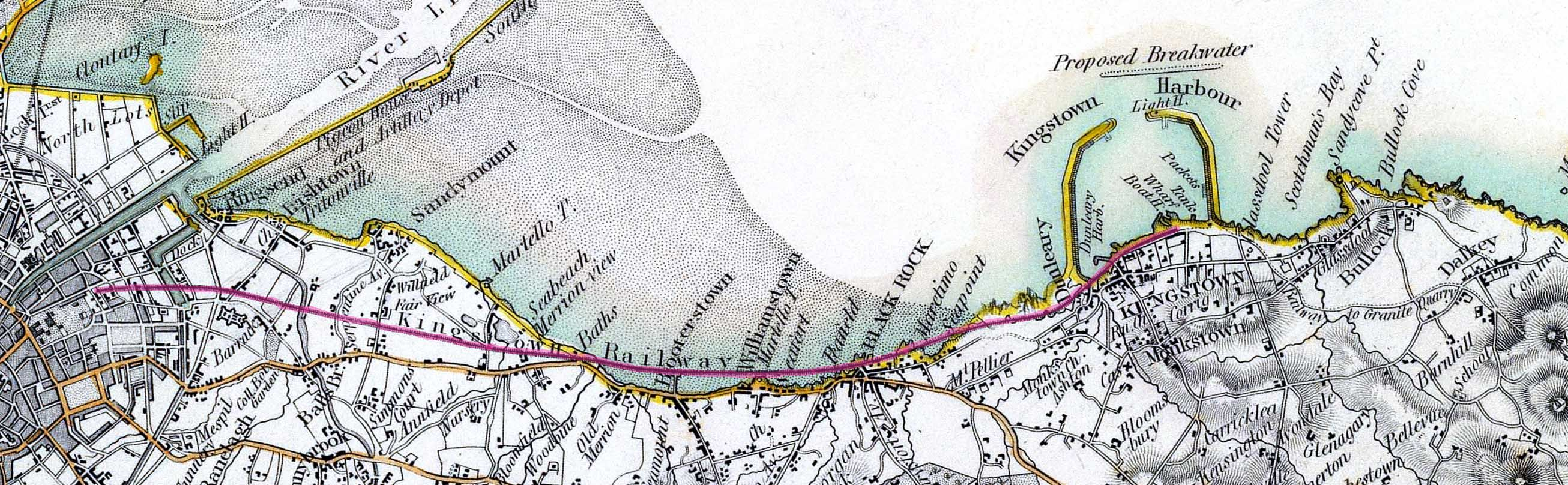
- The line in 1837

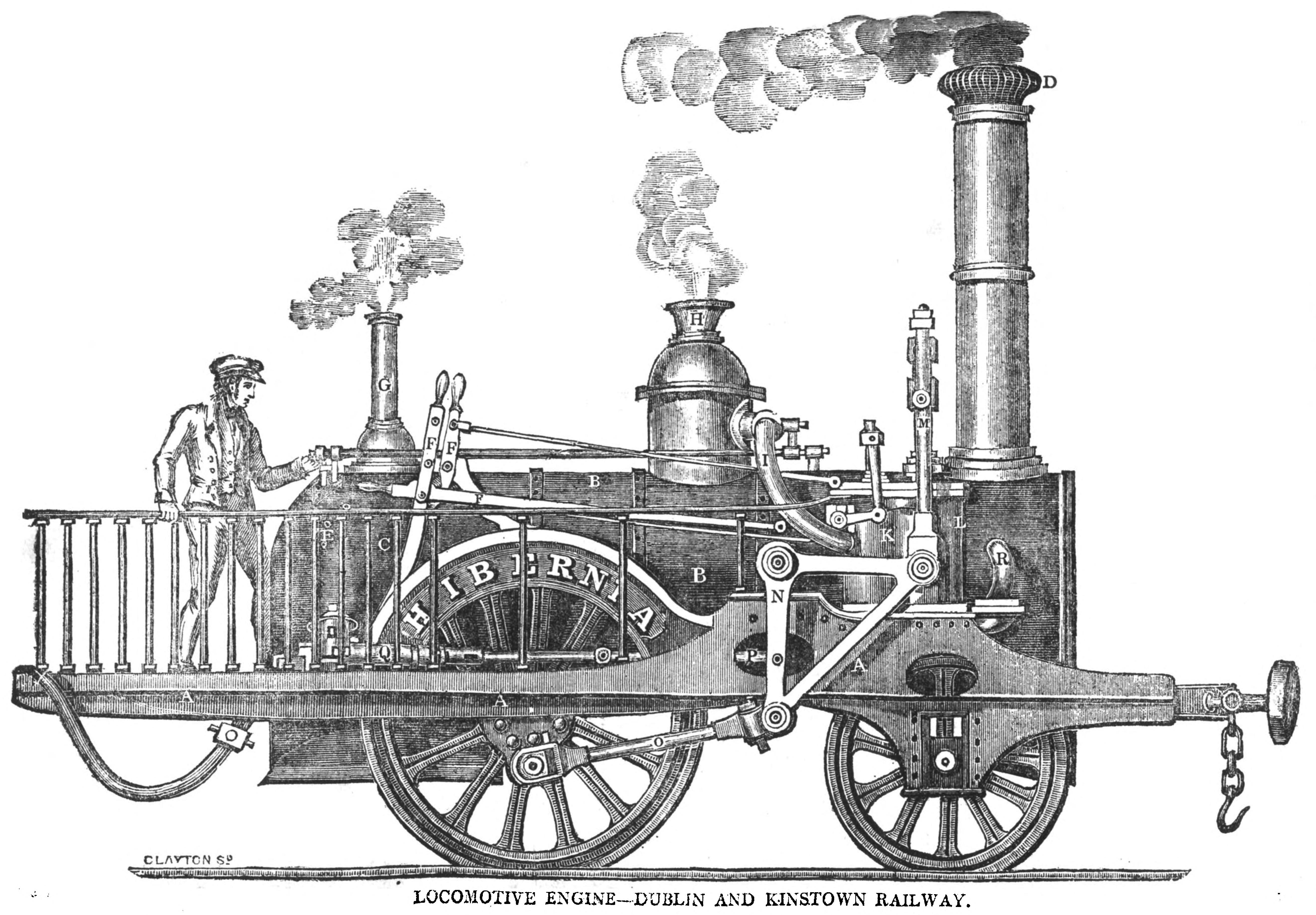
- Sketch of Hibernia

Overview
- Headquarters: Dublin
- Dates of operation: 1834 (Note: The D&KR was formed in 1831 but began operations in 1834.)–1856 (Note: The D&KR handed over operations of the line to the D&WR in 1856 and continued to lease out the line until the 1924 amalgamation into the Great Southern Railways.)
- Successor: Dublin and Wicklow Railway (operator)

Technical
- Track gauge: 5 ft 3 in (1,600 mm)
- Previous gauge: 4 ft 8 1/2 in (1,435 mm) standard gauge As built
- Length: 8.41 miles (13.53 km)

The Dublin and Kingstown Railway (D&KR), which opened in 1834, was Ireland's first passenger railway. It linked Westland Row in Dublin with Kingstown Harbour (Dún Laoghaire) in County Dublin.

The D&KR was also notable for a number of other achievements besides being Ireland's first passenger railway: it operated an atmospheric railway for ten years; claimed the first use of a passenger tank engine; was the world's first commuter railway and was the first railway company to build its own locomotives.

On 30 June 1856 the Dublin and Wicklow Railway (D&WR) took over operation of the line from the D&KR, with the D&KR continuing to lease out the line. The D&WR had formerly been known as the Waterford, Wicklow, Wexford and Dublin Railway (WWW&DR or 3WS). It changed its name to the Dublin, Wicklow and Wexford Railway (DW&WR) in May 1860 and was ultimately renamed the Dublin and South Eastern Railway (D&SER) in 1907, a name which was retained until the amalgamation of the D&KR and D&SER with the Great Southern Railways (GSR) on 1 January 1925. As of 1974, its independent existence of over 90 years by a railway company was only exceeded in the British Isles by the Great Western Railway and the Londonderry and Lough Swilly Railway.

== History ==
=== Beginnings ===
Dublin and Kingstown Railway Act 1831
- Act of Parliament
- Parliament of the United Kingdom
- Long title: An Act for making and maintaining a Railroad from Westland Row in the City of Dublin to the Head of the Western Pier of the Royal Harbour of Kingstown in the County of Dublin, with Branches to communicate therewith.
- Citation: 1 & 2 Will. 4. c. lxix

Dates
- Royal assent: 6 September 1831

Text of statute as originally enacted

1817 had seen the beginning of the construction of a new harbour at Dunleary village that soon began to attract traffic due to silting problems elsewhere around Dublin Bay. The name Kingstown was adopted after King George IV departed from the harbour in 1821. Proposals for canal or rail infrastructure links to Dublin were variously proposed through to the 1830s. James Pim took the initiative and commissioned a plan by Alexander Nimmo which was supported by other businessmen and presented as a petition to the House of Commons on 28 February 1831 for a rail line from near Trinity College to the west pier at the Royal Harbour of Kingstown under a company to be known as the D&KR. A bill was presented and was progressing but was scuppered by a prorogation of Parliament and an election. A fresh bill received royal assent on 6 September 1831 as the Dublin and Kingstown Railway Act 1831 (1 & 2 Will. 4. c. lxix).

A meeting of D&KR subscribers on 25 November 1831 at the Dublin Chamber of Commerce included the submission of a long report which indicated that Westland Row was to be the Dublin terminus and that the enterprise was initially to focus on passenger traffic with a high train frequency. Thomas Pim was appointed chairman. A key appointment was James Pim (Junior) as secretary and Murray notes his "great natural ability, tact, energy, and a valuable business experience". James Pim was appointed Treasurer in May 1832 and effectively functioned as General Manager. The position of clerk/secretary was awarded to Thomas Fleming Bergin who with his engineering background effectively controlled the operation of the railway.

=== Construction ===
The construction contract was awarded to William Dargan, with Charles Blacker Vignoles as engineer. (Note: Nimmo had died, as had his appointed successor, and Stephenson who had reviewed the plans was not available so Vignoles was selected)

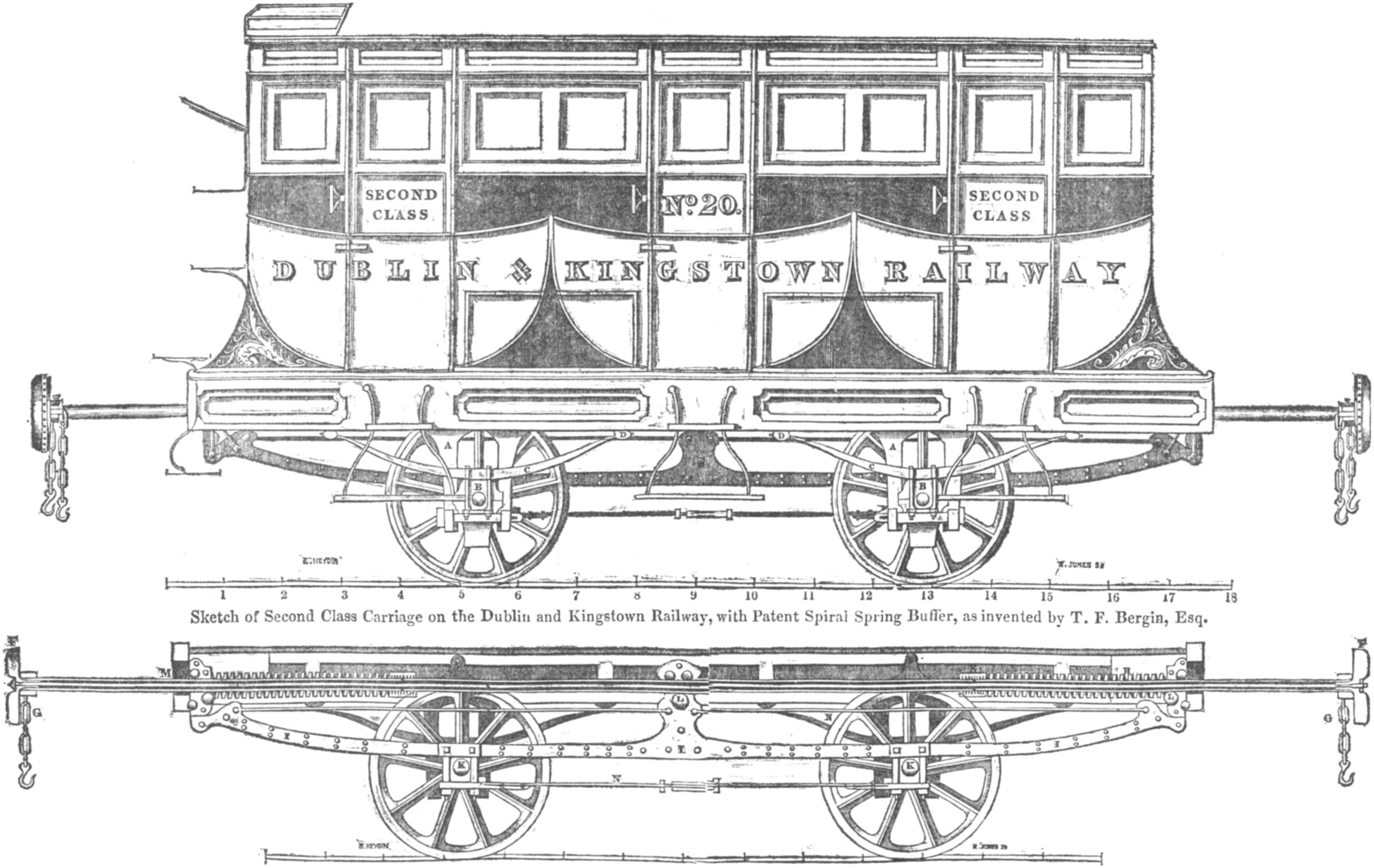
Second Class Carriage of the Dublin and Kingstown Railway, 1835

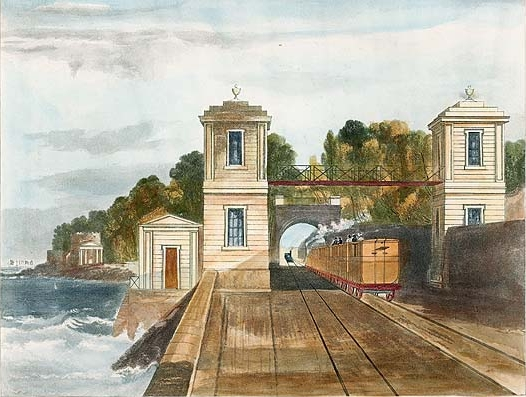
Lord Cloncurry's bridge, near Blackrock, 1834

The line began at Westland Row where the D&KR made its headquarters and initially ran elevated reaching street level around the River Dodder. From Merrion the line ran on an embankment built across the strand to Blackrock which later led to the formation of Booterstown marsh.

While rights for compulsory purchase were generally granted, this was not the case for two landowners who insisted on large cash compensations and in the case of Lord Cloncurry the building of a private footbridge over the line to a bathing area complete with a Romanesque temple, a short tunnel and a cutting to maintain his privacy.

The construction contract was signed on 7 May 1833 and was completed in about 18 months. Thomas Grierson, the DW&WR chief engineer commented in a presentation to the Institution of Civil Engineers of Ireland in 1887 that speed of construction was remarkably short and led to "many failures in masonry, bridges, etc.".

The railway proved expensive to build, the final cost being under a little under £60,000 per mile in total, Murray in 1938 commenting that this rate per mile was one of the highest ever.

=== Trials and first train ===
One of the earliest tests was with a horse pulling a single carriage carrying directors and friends on 31 July 1834; at that stage with only a single line laid throughout. The D&KR claimed that trials expected in September were delayed due to the risks to labourers still working on the line. The first recorded train with invited passengers on 4 October 1834 was hauled by the engine Vauxhall and ran as far as the Williamstown Martello Tower at what is now Blackrock Park before returning. The engine Hibernia on 9 October 1834 hauled another train of invited passengers composed of eight carriages and in this case traversed the whole length of the line and back. Plans were made to introduce a service on 22 October 1834 but storms and flooding damaged the line including wrecking the bridge over the River Dodder and this led to delays for repairs.

Newspaper advertisements of an hourly service and fares for one shilling, eight (old) pence and six pence for first, second and third class respectively indicated the service was to start on Wednesday 17 December 1834. At 9 o'clock on the appointed date the locomotive Hibernia departed with the first train of the day from Westland Row. Throughout the day a total of nine trains of between eight and nine carriages were run, all "full to overflowing", and with a total of almost 5,000 fare paying passengers conveyed.

A timetabled regular service was introduced from January 1835. (Note: In the source Grierson also mentions a date of 17 November 1834 which may be inconsistent with Penny Journal sources of the time)

=== 1837 Kingstown extension ===
Dublin and Kingstown Railway Act 1834
- Act of Parliament
- Parliament of the United Kingdom
- Long title: An Act for enabling the Dublin and Kingstown Railway Company to make an Extension of their present Line of Railway, and for altering and amending the Act for making the said Railway.
- Citation: 4 & 5 Will. 4. c. xxvii

Dates
- Royal assent: 22 May 1834

Text of statute as originally enacted

Dublin and Kingstown Railway Act 1846
- Act of Parliament
- Parliament of the United Kingdom
- Long title: An Act for extending the Line of the Dublin and Kingstown Railway to the Bridge of Bray in the County of Dublin.
- Citation: 9 & 10 Vict. c. ccxiii

Dates
- Royal assent: 16 July 1846

When the plan was prepared for the original line, the D&KR expected that a new wharf was to be completed near their planned terminus at the West Pier at the old harbour. However, Liverpool and Holyhead packets had begun using a jetty at the East Pier, and the location of the new wharf was moved 0.5 mi (0.8 km) eastward to avail of the deeper water needed for steamships; Victoria Wharf opened in 1837. Thus the D&KR had a need, even as it was being built, to extend towards the East Pier and there were thoughts of extending to Dalkey and even to Bray. An 1833 bill to extend to Dalkey evoked strong opposition from many quarters including canal proponents and local property owners, with Thomas Gresham making the strongest impact. With the failure of the previous bill and following careful negotiations, Pim was able to present and get passed a new act of Parliament, the Dublin and Kingstown Railway Act 1834 (4 & 5 Will. 4. c. xxvii), in May 1834 for an extension to Kingstown only. This cut across and isolated a good section of the Old Harbour, ran also beside the existing Dalkey Quarry tramway and also required demolition of a Martello tower and battery in May 1835 before Dargan started work on the extension in May 1836. The line extension to Dún Laoghaire station's current location was announced complete on 13 May 1837, and a directors' special train ran in 13 minutes from Westland Row on that date.

=== Dalkey atmospheric ===
With the substantial construction of most of the pier at Kingstown complete by 1836, the D&KR made an unsuccessful attempt in 1838 to apply to use one track of the Kingstown to Dalkey Quarry stone tramway for horse-drawn trams to Dalkey. In 1842 James Pim observed the Samudas and Clegg demonstration atmospheric railway at Wormwood Scrubs. With both parties agreeing the mutual advantages of a commercial trial of an atmospheric system between Kingstown and Dalkey and funding assisted by the Board of Public Works, transportation trials began on 18 August 1843 with the full public opening on 29 March 1844. The atmospheric operated for about 10 years, and while having some advantages there were ultimately cost and other disadvantages and the operation of the service by the small Princess locomotive (Note: The locomotive received modifications to work the restricted height of the line) during a bad breakdown between 23 December 1848 and 5 February 1849 demonstrated the potential of working the line by conventional locomotives. The final atmospheric train ran on 12 April 1854 when the D&KR handed the line to the D&WR as part of an 1846 agreement for the D&KR to lease their line. The D&WR, who began running services from Bray to Dalkey and Dublin Harcourt Street (Note: Temporary terminus initially) on 10 July 1854 then rebuilt the Dalkey Kingstown section to 5 ft 3 in (1,600 mm), removing the height restriction, and re-opening in October 1855. (Note: The section had to be rebuilt in 1856 due to use of excessively tight curves on gradients)

=== July 1856 operational handover ===
Dublin and Wicklow and Dublin and Kingstown Railway Act 1854
- Act of Parliament
- Parliament of the United Kingdom
- Long title: An Act to enable the Dublin and Wicklow and the Dublin and Kingstown Railway Companies to alter certain existing Contracts therein mentioned; and for other Purposes.
- Citation: 17 & 18 Vict. c. clxxv

Dates
- Royal assent: 24 July 1854

Text of statute as originally enacted

Dublin and Kingstown Railway Act 1860
- Act of Parliament
- Parliament of the United Kingdom
- Long title: An Act for a Modification of the Lease of the Dublin and Kingstown Railway to the Dublin and Wicklow Railway Company; and for regulating the Capital of the Dublin and Kingstown Railway Company; and for other Purposes.
- Citation: 23 & 24 Vict. c. lxii

Dates
- Royal assent: 25 May 1860

Text of statute as originally enacted

Dublin and Kingstown Railway (Lease) Act 1866
- Act of Parliament
- Parliament of the United Kingdom
- Long title: An Act for amending the Lease of the Dublin and Kingstown Railway to the Dublin, Wicklow, and Wexford Railway Company.
- Citation: 29 & 30 Vict. c. xlviii

Dates
- Royal assent: 18 May 1866

The D&KR lease to the D&WR came into operation on 1 July 1856, with the D&KR receiving compensation for all operational equipment. Some engines had already been converted to 5 ft 3 in (1,600 mm), and the D&WR proceeded to convert the whole line from 4 ft 8 1/2 in (1,435 mm) standard gauge to the 5 ft 3 in (1,600 mm) compatible with the rest of the D&WR. Track gauge conversion was done in 1857 at a cost of £38,000.

=== Aftermath ===
Conversion to 5 ft 3 in (1,600 mm) enabled the D&KR to begin a Westland Row to Bray service which the former D&KR section became part of. The D&KR, who were now lessors only, initially believed the D&WR were favouring services on the Harcourt Street Line but this resolved over time. May 1897 saw a Wexford mail train service terminating at Westland Row rather than Harcourt street, this being the start of services south of Bray. The extension to Carlisle Pier was opened in 1859. The opening of the Dublin Loop Line in 1891 enabled commuter services to be extended to Amiens street.

On the 1 January 1925 grouping, both the D&KR and D&SER (Note: The D&WR had changed name to the DW&WR in 1860 and D&SER in 1907) were absorbed into the GSR. Westland Row became the Dublin station for the former Midland Great Western Railway main line services upon the closure of Broadstone in 1937. Ownership moved to CIÉ in 1945 and main line services to Wexford transferred from Harcourt Street prior to that lines closure in 1958. Introduction of the high frequency DART services in the late 1990s saw the move of mainline services from Pearse (Note: Westland Row station was renamed to Pearse in 1966) to Connolly.

== Services ==
From Bradshaw's 1843 timetable:

DUBLIN AND KINGSTOWN
From both ends on weekdays, every half-hour from 6 a.m. until 11½ p.m., stopping at all stations, Viz: Booterstown, Black Rock and Salt Hill.
An extra train from Kingstown at 9¼ a.m. stopping at Merrion in addition to the usual stations.
An extra train every day, at 4¾ p.m., stopping at Merrion only. This train will convey passengers to Her Majesty's mail packet, starting from Kingstown at 5¼ p.m.
The 11 p.m. Up and Down, also stop at Merrion every day.
Sunday trains same hours as on weekdays, with extra trains every ¼ of an hour from 11¾ a.m. to 5¾ p.m. and from 7¾ to 10¼ p.m.
FARES – First Class 1s, second class 8d, third class 6d.

The mail bags are conveyed by the 8½ a.m. by Holyhead; 5 and 10 p.m. by Liverpool.

== Rolling stock ==
=== Locomotives ===
The D&KR initially ordered six locomotives, Hibernia, Britannia, and Manchester from Sharp Brothers together with Vauxhall, Dublin, and Kingstown from George Forrester and Company. The Sharps' engines employed vertical cylinders whilst the Forresters' were horizontal. Vauxhall and Hibernia were the first to arrive by ship for £21 each and participated in public trials in October 1834 with Hibernia hauling the first fee paying service on 17 December 1834. The design of Hibernia and her sisters proved problematic and they were withdrawn early, Hibernia having been noted to have exploded in 1842. The D&KR ordered a further locomotive Star from Forrester. This was followed by two 2-2-0T well tanks locomotives, Victoria and Comet, again from Forrester's. These were the first tank locomotives in public passenger service.

1841 saw the D&KR's Grand Canal Street railway works build the 2-2-0T well tank Princess which was the first locomotive in the world built by a railway company's own workshop. Princess was also noted for being modified to fit the 8 feet 6 inches (2.59 m) profile of the Dalkey Atmospheric Railway and worked that line for the period 23 December 1848 to 5 February 1849 when the atmospheric system broke down.

Grand Canal Street also produced a series of locomotives for the D&KR after Princess, the list includes such names as Belleisle, Shamrock, Erin, Albert, Burgoyne, Cyclops, Vulcan, Jupiter and possibly Juno. Some of these were either built or re-built to the 5 ft 3 in (1,600 mm) gauge that was adopted around 1856. A small number of these engines were noted as still operating in the 1870s where they looked diminutive compared to their successor 2-2-2WT Neilson locomotives introduced from 1865.

=== Carriages ===
The D&KR initially introduced four types of four wheeled carriages. The fully enclosed purple first class carriage had 3 compartments, each with two rows of upholstered seats seating three abreast. The pale yellow covered carriages also had upholstered seats in three compartments but at four abreast for a total of 24 passengers. The green second class open class carriages were only used in summer. They had open sides and a roof and seated 28 in seven rows. Blue third class carriages were understood to have had roofs despite the depictions of contemporary illustrations. Capacity per carriage was 35 in seven rows of five abreast on boarded seats with low backrests. Typical trains consists were a single first class carriage, two to four second class and three third class. Many carriages were converted to 5 ft 3 in (1,600 mm) gauge in the mid-1850s.

=== Preservation ===
One item of Dublin and Kingstown stock has survived into preservation.

Open-sided second No. 38, built in 1834 for 4 ft 8 1/2 in (1,435 mm) gauge and re-gauged for 5 ft 3 in (1,600 mm) in 1857, was stored by the DW&WR, later at Inchicore Works by the Great Southern Railways, along with third No. 48, built in 1838. They went to the 100th anniversary of the British Rainhill Trials in 1929 with Great Southern and Western Railway locomotive No. 36 before being returned to rot in Inchicore dump. No. 48 was restored and preserved by the Belfast Transport Museum in 1964, where it remains in the Ulster Folk and Transport Museum to this day. Unfortunately, No. 38 was considered to be too badly damaged by weathering and rot to be overhauled, and was scrapped while No. 48 was restored.

=== Models ===
The Fry Collection contains a scale model replica of the first train in Ireland consisting of locomotive, tender and four carriages of different types. The Science Museum, London possesses 1:6 model of the 1851 built D&KR 2-2-2T locomotive Alexandra built by T. H. Goodisson and dating from the 1850s or shortly thereafter.

== Incidents ==
- Sunday 22 February 1835: the first passenger fatality; William Thomson was travelling on the carriage step and either jumped or was thrown off near Blackrock, striking Lord Cloncurry's railing, and was fatally injured.
- Tuesday 24 February 1835: a woman gave birth in a third class carriage on the 20:00 train from Dublin to Kingstown, the first record of such an event in Ireland.
- 28 March 1835: locomotive Vauxhall collided with Dublin coming out of a locomotive yard, then crashed tender-first into a wall. Repairs took about a week.
- June 1840: Locomotives Star and Victoria collided; directors concluded that the Star was uneconomical to repair due to its mechanical state caused by previous derailments and wear.
- 27 October 1842: the inner firebox of locomotive Hibernia collapsed; the explosion wrecked the locomotive and tender. The crew were fortunately in the waiting room at the time and so avoided being showered in red-hot coke. The engine was scrapped, and the others of her class were taken out of service until a close examination was completed and then sold to contractors in 1843 and 1846.
- February 1849: Cyclops failed to stop when entering Westland row, resulting in a collision. The tank locomotives had no brakes at that time, but relied on a combination of the guard applying the brake in a third class carriage and the locomotive driver using his reversing gear. Tank locomotives subsequently had brakes fitted.
- August 1853: on the Dalkey Atmospheric section, a boy leaned out to see a balloon from a third class carriage with waist-high sides and open windows. He struck his head on a bridge and was killed.

== Gallery ==
Scenes

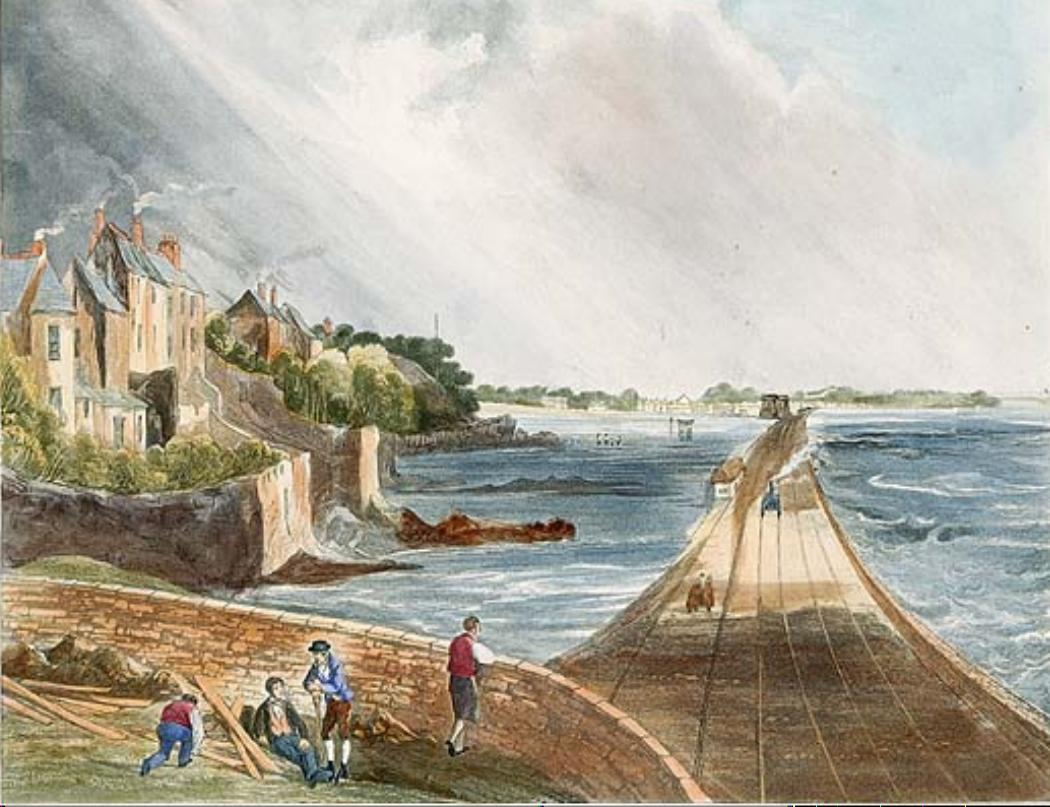
The view from Blackrock towards Merrion, 1834

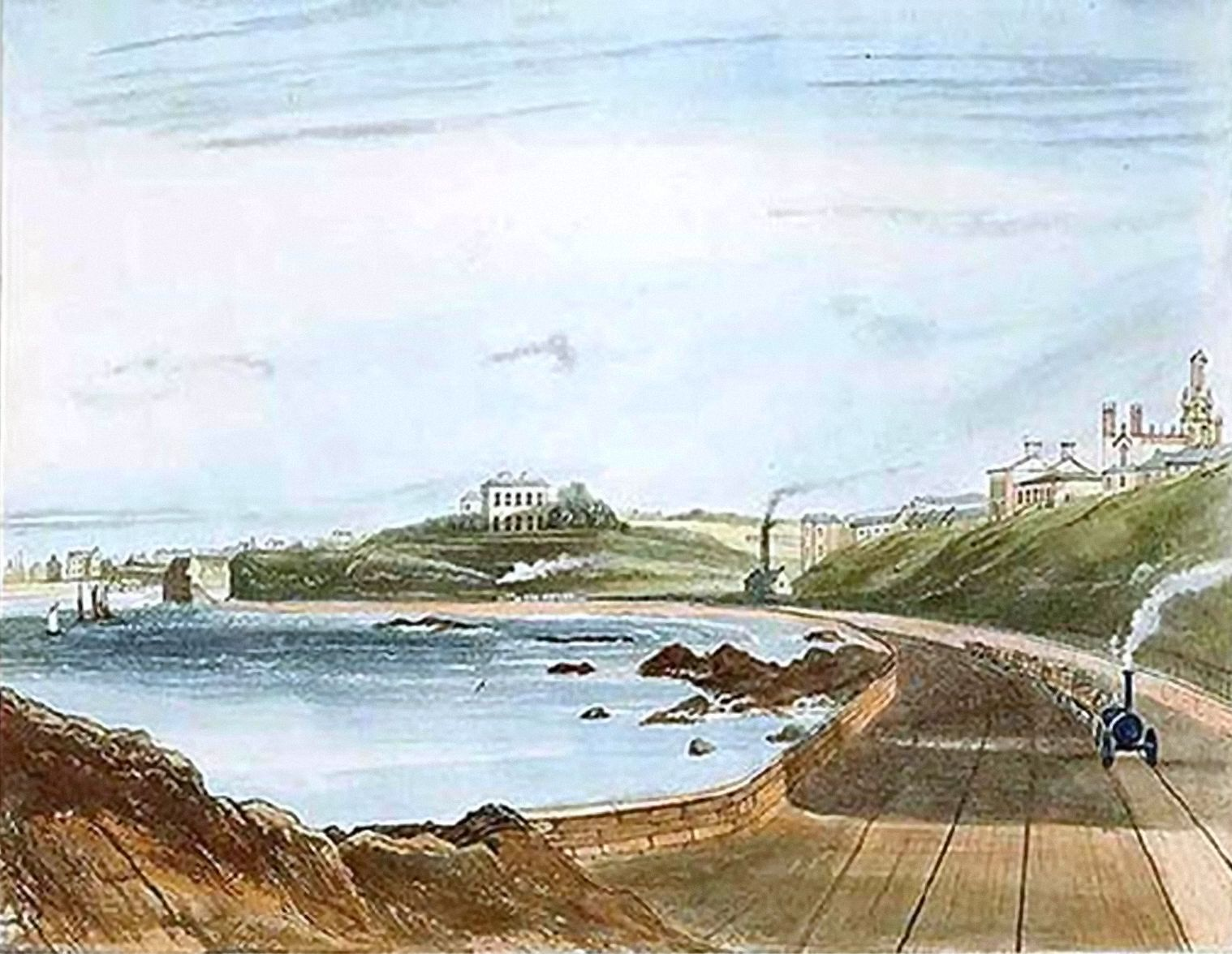
From the Martello Tower at Seapoint, looking towards Kingstown, 1834

"From the Foot Bridge at Sea Point Hotel, looking towards Salt Hill....Kingstown Harbour in the distance", 1834

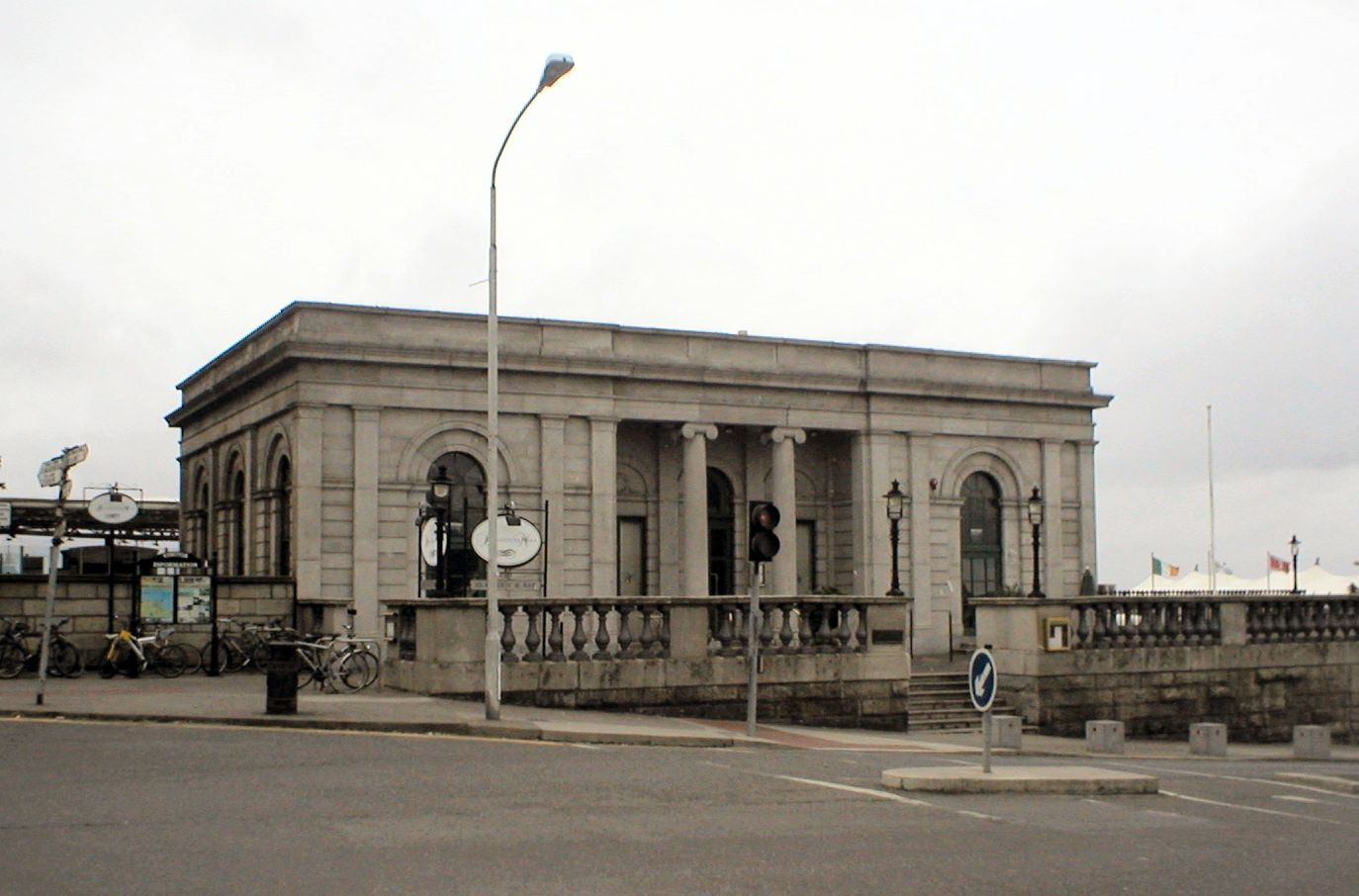
The original Kingstown railway station (1844–1971), now a restaurant. Architect: John Mulvany

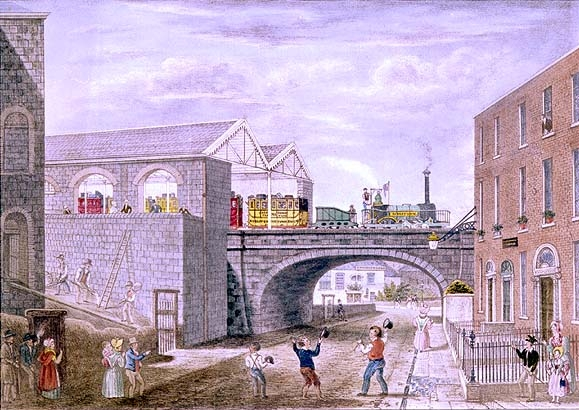
Rear of Westland Row Station, Cumberland St., first train, 1834

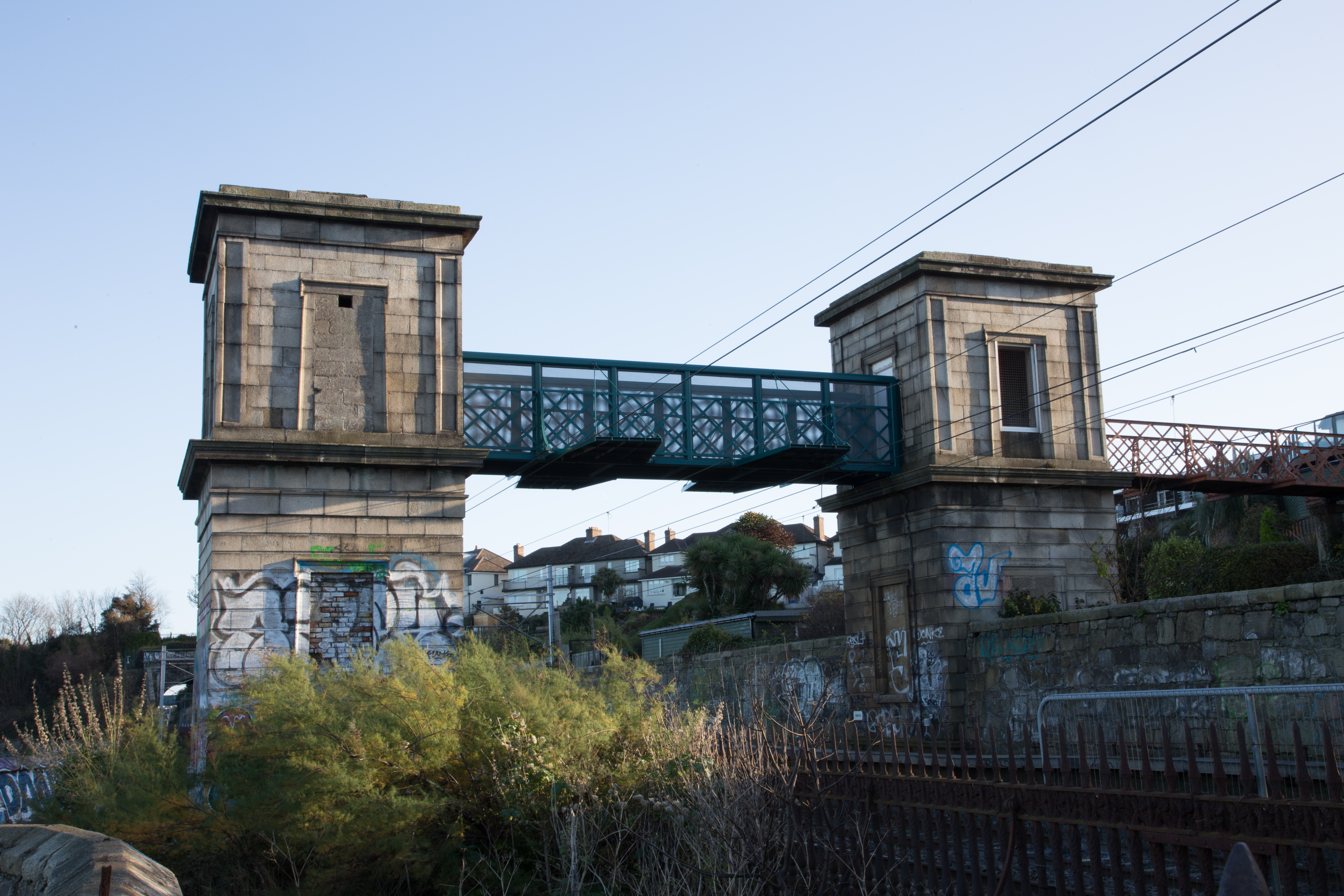
Lord Cloncurry's bridge, near Blackrock, 2017, now unused.

== See also ==
- History of rail transport in Ireland
- Track gauge in Ireland
- Timeline of railway history

== Notes references and sources ==
=== Sources ===
- Ahrons, E. L. (1954). L. L. Asher (ed.). Locomotive and train working in the latter part of the nineteenth century. Vol. six. W Heffer & Sons Ltd. OCLC 606019549. OL 21457769M.
- An Taisce (2015). "Booterstown Marsh". Archived from the original on 24 October 2015.
- Baker, Michael H. C. (1972). Irish Railways since 1916. Ian Allan. ISBN 0711002827. OCLC 248259641.
- Casserley, H.C. (1974). Outine of Irish Railway History. Newton Abbot: David & Charles. ISBN 0715363778.
- Cox, Ronald C.; Gould, Michael H. (1998). Civil Engineering Heritage: Ireland. London: Thomas Telford. ISBN 978-0-7277-2627-8. (1 & 2 Wm. IV, Cap. 69)
- Dublin Tourism, Office. Heritage Trails. Signposted Walking Tours of Dublin (PDF). Dublin Tourism.
- Fry, C.L. (September 1960). "Cover Picture". Model Railway Constructor. Vol. 27, no. 317. Ian Allan.
- Grierson, Thomas B (1887). "The enlargement of Westland Row Terminus Part I". Transactions of the Institution of Civil Engineers of Ireland. 18. Institution of Civil Engineers of Ireland. Archived from the original on 23 July 2019.
- Hardy (30 August 1834a). "The Dublin and Kingstown Railway". The Dublin Penny Journal. 3 (113): 65–68. JSTOR 30004368.
- —— (25 October 1834b). "The Dublin and Kingstown Railway". The Dublin Penny Journal. 3 (121): 132–133. JSTOR 30004086.
- —— (25 October 1834c). "The View From the Rail Way at Salt-Hill". The Dublin Penny Journal. 3 (121): 133–134. JSTOR 30004087.
- Knowles, Richard Brinsley (April 1854). "Memoir of William Dargan". The Illustrated London Magazine. 2. London: Piper, Stephenson, and Spence.
- Kullmann, Kurt (2018). The First Irish Railway: Westland Row to Kingstown. THP Ireland. ISBN 978-0750987646.
- McMahon, ed. (2003). The Construction of Dun Laoghaire Harbour (PDF) (Report). Dun Laoghaire Harbour Company. Archived (PDF) from the original on 21 February 2019.
- Murray, Kevin (March 1938a). "Dublin's First Railway". Dublin Historical Record. 1 (1). Old Dublin Society: 19–26. JSTOR 30080030. Part 1 – From the inception to the opening.
- —— (June 1938b). "Dublin's First Railway". Dublin Historical Record. 1 (2). Old Dublin Society: 33–40. JSTOR 30080094. Part 2 – The line in operation.
- —— (1981). Ireland's First Railway. Dublin: Irish Railway Record Society. ISBN 0-904078-07-8.
- Pearson, Peter (1981). Dun Laoghaire Kingstown. O'Brien Press. ISBN 0-905140-83-4.
- Science Museum Group (2020). "Model of locomotive "Alexandra", Dublin and Kingstown Railway". Science Museum Group Collection. Archived from the original on 9 September 2020.
- Shepherd, Ernie (1974). The Dublin & South Eastern Railway. David and Charles. ISBN 0715363611.
