= Pym (surname) =

Pym is a surname, and may refer to:

- Alexander Pym (c.1547–1585), English politician
- Alexander Ruthven Pym (1891–1971), British Army officer and Chairman of Kent County Council
- Anthony Pym (born 1956), Australian translation scholar
- Barbara Pym (1913–1980), English novelist
- Catherine Pym (1921–2018), Australian fencer
- Sir Charles Pym, 1st Baronet (c.1615–1671), English politician and Parliamentarian officer
- Charles Pym (Conservative politician) (1841–1918), British politician
- Charles Pym (British Army officer) (1879–1971), British Army officer and Chairman of Kent County Council
- Chris Pym (born 1966), Australian rules footballer
- Christy Pym (born 1995), English football goalkeeper
- Dave Pym, New Zealand-Canadian lacrosse coach
- Dick Pym (1893–1988), English football goalkeeper
- Ernie Pym (1935–2004), English footballer
- Francis Pym (1922–2008), British politician and life peer
- Francis Pym (1756–1833) (1756–1833), British politician
- Horace Pym (1844–1896), British book collector and editor
- Hugh Pym (born 1959), British journalist and author
- James Pym (1852–1893), British soldier in the U.S. Army
- John Pym (1584–1643), English politician
- John Pym (rugby union, born 1891) (1891–1969), English rugby union footballer
- John Pym (rugby union, born c. 1900) (born c. 1900), Australian rugby union footballer
- Leslie Pym (1884–1945), British politician
- Patrick Pym (1936–2019), British competitive sailor
- Roland Pym (1910–2006), British artist and theatrical designer
- Samuel Pym (1778–1855), Royal Navy officer
- Thomas Wentworth Pym (1885–1945), British clergyman
- Walter Pym (actor) (1905–1980), Australian actor
- Walter Pym (bishop) (1856–1908), English colonial bishop
- William Pym (1772–1861), British military surgeon

== See also ==
- Pym baronets, in the Baronetage of England
- Pim (surname)
