= Pim (surname) =

Pim is a surname, and may refer to:

- Bedford Pim (1826–1886), English naval officer and barrister
- Herbert Moore Pim (1883–1950), Irish political eccentric and writer
- James Pim (1796–1856), Irish banker and railway pioneer
- Jonathan Pim (1806–1885) (1806–1885), Irish politician
- Jonathan Pim (1858–1949) (1858–1949), Irish lawyer, judge and politician
- Joshua Pim (1869–1942), Irish doctor and tennis player
- Joshua Pim (1748–1822) (1748–1822), Irish merchant
- Keiron Pim (born 1978), British journalist and author
- Raymond Pim (1897–1993), American farmer and politician from Iowa
- Richard Pim (1900–1987, British civil servant and Royal Navy officer
- Sheila Pim (1909–1995), Irish crime novelist
- Steven Pim (died 2023), Papua New Guinean politician

== See also ==
- Pim (name)
- Pim family
- Pimm
- Pym
