= PIM =

PIM or Pim may refer to:

== Computing ==
- Parallel inference machine, an intended fifth generation computer
- Personal information management
- Personal information manager software
- Personal Information Module for PalmDOS
- Personal Iterations Multiplier for VeraCrypt
- Protocol Independent Multicast, Internet protocols
- Processor-in-memory, CPU and memory on the same chip

== Engineering, science, and mathematics ==
- Passive intermodulation of signals
- Phosphatidylmyo-inositol mannosides, a glycolipid component of the cell wall of Mycobacterium tuberculosis
- Principal indecomposable module in mathematical module theory

== Business ==
- Product information management
- Partnerized Inventory Management
- Pim Brothers & Co., large Irish family business founded in the nineteenth century

== People ==
=== Given name ===
- Pim (name)

=== Surname ===
- Pim (surname)
- Pim family, an Anglo-Irish Quaker family

=== Fictional ===
- Pim Diffy, a character in TV series Phil of the Future
- Pim Pimling, a character in the TV series Smiling Friends

== Places ==
- Pimhill or Pim Hill, England
- Pim Island, Canada
- Pim (river), Russia
- Pondok Indah Mall, Indonesia

== Other uses ==
- Pacific Islands Monthly, a news magazine, discontinued 2000
- Penalty (ice hockey) (Penalties infraction minutes)
- Pim Fortuyn List, Dutch political party
- Pim weight in ancient Israel
- Prague International Marathon
- Providence Industrial Mission
- Public Illumination Magazine

== See also ==
- Pimm's, alcoholic beverages
- Pym (disambiguation)
