= Pim family =

Anglo-Irish Quaker family

The Pim family is an Anglo-Irish Quaker family, long associated with the town of Mountmellick in County Laois and later prominent in the commercial, civic and professional life of Dublin. From the eighteenth century onward, members of the family were notable as textile manufacturers and merchants, railway pioneers, politicians, lawyers, naval officers and sportsmen.

== Origins ==
The Pims were among the first Quakers in Ireland. According to tradition, John Pim (1641–1718) was converted to Quakerism by William Edmundson — held to be the first Quaker in Ireland — in County Cavan, and in 1659, then aged about eighteen, was one of a small group who settled with Edmundson in the vicinity of Mountmellick in Queen's County (now County Laois). Pims appear in the meeting records of the period: William Edmundson's A Journal of the Life... of William Edmundson notes a John Pim among Friends in the Cavan settlement in 1656, subscribing on behalf of the meeting in 1699, and a Thomas Pim and John Pim junior in 1716. The family became established farmers and traders in the Mountmellick and Mountrath districts, and they are recorded as among the few of those early settler families still resident in the area in modern times.

The family was thus long associated with the town of Mountmellick, one of several Quaker families that helped develop it. The Pims who founded the Dublin firm of Pim Brothers & Co. descended from a Jonathan Pim of Mountmellick (born 1741, son of Tobias Pim and Susanna Eves), whose sons James, Thomas, Jonathan and Joseph Robinson Pim established the business in the late eighteenth century. A separate branch of the family moved to Dublin in 1795.

Because many family members shared the same forenames across generations, their genealogy has proved difficult to disentangle even for historians.

== Business interests ==
=== Pim Brothers & Co. ===
Pim Brothers & Co. was a Dublin textile and retail business founded by the Quaker Pim family in the late eighteenth and early nineteenth centuries. The brothers were principally manufacturers of poplin and drapers, but also traded as general merchants in goods including butter, tobacco and cotton, and conducted international trade with America. Under the guidance of Jonathan Pim, the firm opened a pioneering department store on South Great George's Street in Dublin in the 1850s, designed by Sandham Symes. The store was sold to Great Universal Stores in 1955 and the building was demolished in the 1970s.

=== Railways ===
James Pim (1796–1856), a stockbroker from the branch of the family that moved to Dublin in 1795, was the driving force behind the Dublin and Kingstown Railway, the first passenger railway in Ireland, serving as its secretary and treasurer. He was also instrumental in establishing the Dalkey Atmospheric Railway, the first commercial atmospheric railway in the world, opened in 1844.

== Notable members ==
=== Joshua Pim (1748–1822) ===
Joshua Pim was a Dublin merchant active in the cotton trade in the late eighteenth and early nineteenth centuries, who was instrumental in establishing the Dublin Chamber of Commerce. In 1783, together with John Patrick, he drafted the basis for the Chamber, which continued the work of the former Committee of Merchants, and he served as both its treasurer and information officer. With his brother Joseph he traded as Joshua and Joseph Pim of Usher's Island, a premises later associated with James Joyce's "The Dead". He never married, and on his death his business interests passed to his nephew George Pim.

=== James Pim (1796–1856) ===
James Pim, often distinguished from his father as "junior", came from a branch of the family that moved to Dublin in 1795. A stockbroker and partner in the firm of Boyle, Low, Bickerstaff and Pim, he was the driving force behind the Dublin and Kingstown Railway, the first passenger railway in Ireland, serving as its secretary and treasurer. He was also instrumental in establishing the Dalkey Atmospheric Railway, the first commercial atmospheric railway in the world, opened in 1844.

=== Jonathan Pim (1806–1885) ===
Jonathan Pim was an Irish Liberal Party politician who served as Member of Parliament for Dublin City from 1865 to 1874. A Quaker, he acted as secretary for the Quaker Relief fund during the Great Irish Famine and was president of the Statistical and Social Inquiry Society of Ireland from 1875 to 1877. He led the expansion of the family firm into department-store retailing.

=== Jonathan Ernest Pim (1858–1949) ===
Jonathan Ernest Pim, a grandson of Jonathan Pim (1806–1885), was an Irish lawyer, judge and Liberal politician. He served as Solicitor-General for Ireland (1913–14) and Attorney-General for Ireland (1914–15) before being appointed a judge of the High Court of Justice in Ireland, and was briefly a Lord Justice of Ireland following the Easter Rising.

=== Joshua Pim (1869–1942) ===
Joshua Pim was an Irish medical doctor and amateur tennis player who won the Wimbledon men's singles title in 1893 and 1894 and the men's doubles in 1890 and 1893. He was regarded by many contemporaries as among the finest players of his era.

=== Sir Richard Pim (1900–1987) ===
Captain Sir Richard Pike Pim, a great-grandson of Jonathan Pim (1806–1885), was a British naval officer and civil servant. During the Second World War he ran the Map Room at 10 Downing Street for Winston Churchill, and he later served as Inspector-General of the Royal Ulster Constabulary from 1945 to 1961.

== Family connections ==
The Pim family developed an extensive network of marriage and business connections with other Quaker families, including the Todhunter, Bewley and Goff families. Among descendants connected to the family was the Irish diplomat Charles Bewley, a great-grandson of Jonathan Pim (1806–1885).

Bedford Pim (1826–1886), a Royal Navy officer, Arctic explorer, barrister and Conservative MP, shared the family surname but was born in Bideford, Devon, into an English naval family; the available sources do not establish a connection to the Irish Quaker Pims.

== See also ==
- Pim Brothers & Co.
- Mountmellick
- Religious Society of Friends
