= Charles Pym =

Charles Pym may refer to:

- Sir Charles Pym, 1st Baronet (1615–1671)
- Charles Pym (Conservative politician) (1841–1918), MP for Bedford 1895
- Sir Charles Pym, 2nd Baronet (1664–1688) of the Pym baronets
- Charles Pym (British Army officer) (1879–1971), chairman of Kent County Council
