= Ini Adiakpan =

Nigerian Politician

- Born: 30 October 1960 (age 65); Ekpene Obo
- Education: Bachelor of Art
- Occupation: Politician
- Family: Jacob Bassey Adiakpan

Princess Ini Adiakpan (born 30 October 1960), is a Nigerian politician who served as a commissioner for women affairs and social welfare in Akwa Ibom State. She was appointed by Governor Udom Emmanuel August, 2020; and was reappointed by Governor Umo Eno in July 2023. Ini was bestowed with an award for her outstanding support for changing the narratives for the vulnerable in Nigeria. Ini adiakpan was bestowed with the honour by the National Council on Women Affairs (NCWS) during its 23rd Regular National Council Meeting which took place in Calabar, the Cross River state capital.

== Birth and personal life ==
Adiakpan was born on 30 October 1960 into the family of late Jacob Bassey Adiakpan. She is from Ekpene Obo in Esit-Eket local government area, Akwa Ibom State.

== Education ==
Adiakpan began her primary education at Salvation Army Primary School, Etinan. She attended Salvation Army Secondary School, Akai Ubium, in 1972 for her secondary education and later completed at Union Secondary school in 1977. She furthered her studies by enrolling at the School of Basic Studies, Ogoja, where she studied English and later studied history at the College of Education, Uyo. In 1993, she did her NYSC at Wudil Technical College, Wudil, Kano State. she bagged a Bachelor of Arts degree in education at Ahmadu Bello University. In 1994, she earned her master's degree in educational technology at the University of Port-Harcourt. In 2010, she bagged a Doctor of Philosophy in education technology.

== Career ==
Ini has served as an electoral commissioner in the Akwa Ibom State Independent Electoral Commission, AkISIEC, and was appointed as the commissioner for Women Affairs and Social Welfare in Akwa Ibom State, in 2020. She was a member of the Transition Committee appointed by Udom Emmanuel in 2023, to handle the task of ensuring a seamless transition of government. She is currently the Delivery Advisor to Governor Umo Eno on Nigeria for women Project. She is also the Proprietor of Nema Adiakpan Nursery & Primary School and also the executive director of Life Bridge and Empowerment Foundation.
