= Anandaban Hospital =

Government hospital in Biratnagar, Nepal

Geography
- Location: Lele, Lalitpur, Bagmati Province, Nepal
- Coordinates: 27°34′36″N 85°18′56″E

Organisation
- Type: Specialist

Services
- Emergency department: Yes
- Beds: 110 beds
- Speciality: Leprosy

History
- Opened: 1957

Links
- Website: https://tlmnepal.org

Anandaban Hospital aka Anandaban Leprosy Hospital is a non-government specialized tertiary leprosy care hospital located in Lele, Lalitpur in Bagmati Province of Nepal. It provides service to about 50,000 leprosy and general patients every year.

In partnership with International Nepal Fellowship, it runs Green Pastures Hospital and Rehabilitation Center in Pokhara.

== History ==
It was established in 1957 with the aid of the Christian International Non-government organisation, The Leprosy Mission (TLM) in Lele, the southern part of Lalitpur. Since 2005, TLM Nepal has been working as an independent NGO to provide specialist tertiary care and technical support for Leprosy control programs with the partnership between TLM International and the Government of Nepal.
