= Leprosy Mission Australia =

Christian medical and aid organisation

- Formation: 1913
- Founded: 1913
- Founder: The Leprosy Mission International
- Type: Non-Government Organisation
- Purpose: Treatment, rehabilitation and support for people with leprosy
- Location: Melbourne, Australia (Head Office)
- Region served: 5 countries (2023)
- Method: Medication, surgery, advocacy, education and awareness
- Key people: Greg J Clarke (CEO)
- Revenue: A$7.866 million (2023)
- Employees: 23 (FTE, 2019)
- Website: www.leprosymission.org.au

The Leprosy Mission Australia (TLMA) is a Christian medical charity dedicated to eradicating leprosy, and supporting those affected by the disease. An independent Australian charity, it is an active member of Leprosy Mission International (LMI) a global federation working in 28 countries. With a history dating back to 1913, TLMA focuses on providing medical treatment, rehabilitation, education, and advocacy for people affected by leprosy, especially those in marginalised communities.

The mission raises funds through church and community networks to fund doctors, nurses and specialist healthcare professions in clinics and hospitals around the developing world. It has also been a fellowship who recruits, supports and sends the leprosy specialists, including the surgeon Grace Warren, Professor Warrick Britton, and the microbiologist Jenny Davis.

The stated goal of Leprosy Mission Australia is a world free from leprosy and its associated social shame, sometimes described as zero transmission, zero disability, zero stigma. This vision aligns with the Sustainable Development Goals of the United Nations which aim to end the neglect of neglected tropical diseases like leprosy, of which Australia is a signatory. The mission is accredited by the Australian Government's Department of Foreign Affairs and Trade, who funds may of its projects through Australian Aid.

Leprosy is a chronic, infectious disease, also known as Hansens Disease, caused by the bacterium Mycobacterium leprae. While the disease has been feared throughout history, and it sufferers frequently experience social rejection, Gospel accounts—such as Jesus cleansing a person affected by leprosy—have compelled many Australian Christians to serve those who live with the condition. As such the mission and its auxiliaries have historically seen their work as medical, social and spiritual in nature, putting strong emphasis on prayer for their work.

The group funds research programs based in the Stanley Browne Laboratory in India, which has emerged as authority on the transmission of the bacteria in the environment, within households and via the nose. Thanks to significant breakthroughs, particularly the three-drug leprostatic agent of rifampicin, dapsone and clofazimine, TLMA has seen a steep decline in the number of people contracting leprosy, dropping from 11 million in the 1980s to 1 million by 2000. By 2021, the number is estimated to have dropped to 208,000. By 2035, the leadership hopes to see all transmission of the disease disrupted.

== Programs ==
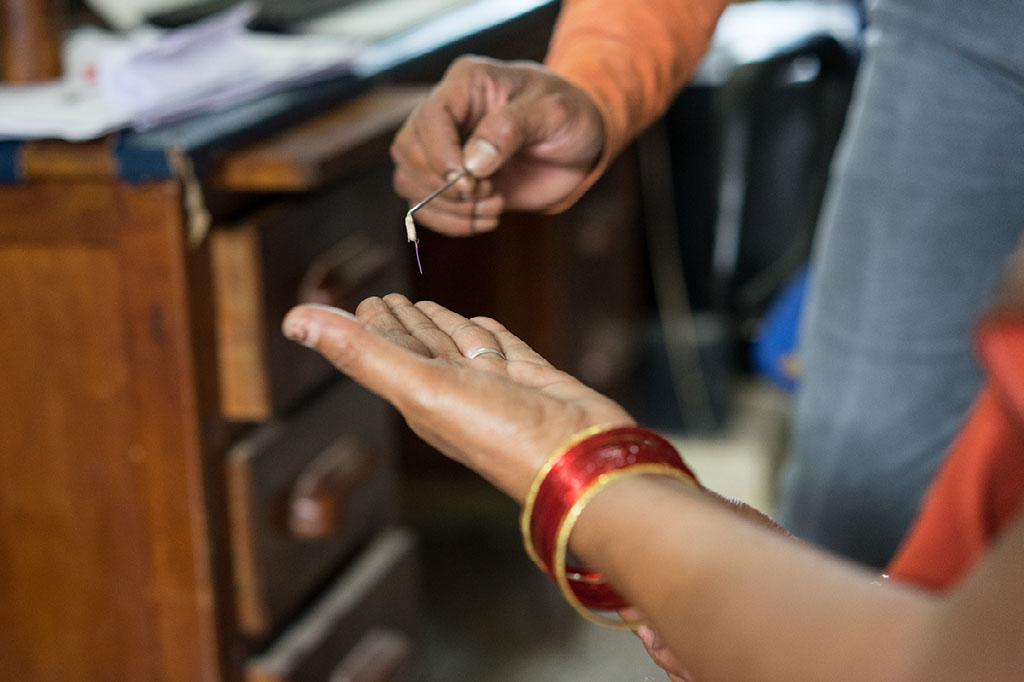
Nerve function assessment at Kothara Hospital, India, an earlier project of the mission

Leprosy Mission Australia began by delivering 2 pounds and 10 shillings in funding to one project, in India. In the mid-1990s, the biggest contributor to the work of the international network, after England and Wales, was Leprosy Mission Australia.

As of 2023, according to Australian Charities and Not-for-profits Commission records, the mission funded ten projects in India, Indonesia, Nepal, Nigeria and Timor-Leste drawing on a budget of $7.866 million. These projects provide essential medical services, including diagnosis, treatment, and rehabilitation, particularly to those who have no other access to healthcare.

=== Contemporary projects ===
Country	Programs	Ref.
India	Vocational training centre in Vadathorasalur for people with leprosy (2018–2022). Disability management and job creation through trade accreditation and developing producer groups (2019–2023). Free specialised services at Salur and Kothara Hospitals (2023–2028).	
Indonesia	Urban Leprosy project, trains doctors in diagnosis and treatment (2022–2025). Leprosy Friendly Village, community awareness and stigma reduction program (2022–2025).	
Nepal	Jhapa Leprosy Reduction, reducing child transmission across six municipalities (2022–2027). Nepal Tertiary Education Scholarships (2022–2027). Self-care unit rehabilitation for people with leprosy who require ulcer and wound care (2022–2027).	
Nigeria	Updating health infrastructure, active case detection, artificial limb provision; advocacy for people with leprosy so they can vote without a thumbprint; improved water, sanitation and hygiene practices (2019–2024).	
Timor-Leste	Improved Leprosy Services in partnership with TL Ministry of Health, including early detection program, in Baucau and Manatuto, developing technicians to provide diagnostics in 15 health centres (2019–2024).	

=== Historic projects ===
Country	Programs	Ref.
Bangladesh	Health, Education and Economic Development program rolled out from Dhaka to 32 districts of Bangladesh, led by Keith Skillicorn (1982–1988)	
Bhutan	Work led by Dr Helen Rienits (née Stokes) as superintendent of government hospital at Mongar Hospital. Leprosy was declared a manageable disease in the country from 1992 (1982–1992).	
Congo	In the 1950s the mission known to support patients in what was then the Belgian Congo with hand-knitted woollens. It supported the work of the Australian field worker Maggie Mead, who served with the Leprosy Mission in Lemera Hospital, and later in Bukavu, in what is now known as the Democratic Republic of the Congo.	
Ethiopia	Supporting the work of the ALERT medical facility in Addis Ababa; through the work of physiotherapist Anne Roberts, training was provided for rehabilitation and prevention of disability.	
Hong Kong	Leprosy Hospital in Hei Ling Chau, became base hospital for the surgical teaching ministry of Dr Grace Warren (1959–1975).	
India	Ida Griffiths sailed for India in to serve in Karigiri (1960s). Mobile clinic run across Bihar by Keith Skillicorn (1970s). Support for the Kolkata leprosy projects (1990-2000s).	
Indonesia	At the invitation of the Department of Health, Dr Ernest Fritschi was appointed to begin a medical service in West Irian and Medan (1960s). Work in Irian later led by Myra Ronalds (1973–1996). Work amongst Dyak people in Kalimantan Province on Borneo led by Jim and Robyn Nottingham (1996–2005).	
Korea	Funding for Leprosy Mission in Korea, led by Dr. C. H. Erwin.	
Nepal	Deidra Banks headed up the mission in Anandaban developing the rehabilitation work (1960s). Development of the Mycobacterial Research Laboratory, training Nepali scientists, with Dr Paul Roche and Jenny Davis; later work led by Prof Warwick Britton (1980s). The large Lalgadh Hospital established thanks to Marion and Ian Cochrane (1990s). Anandaban Leprosy Hospital, led by Dr Des and Dr Wendy Soares (1989–1997). Elisa Yule leads medical care for women with leprosy in Central Development Region.	
Niger	Supporting the work of the Danja leprosy and general hospital Danja hospital in Maradi, Niger in the 2000s; particularly early treatment and disability strategies; with 40,000 adults and children attended each year; Australian Occupational therapist Helen Nixon serving there.	
Nigeria	Micro-enterprise project in Okegbala. Occupational therapy project (1998)	
Papua New Guinea	Reconstructive surgery led by Dr Ken Clezy with nurse Val Taylor, based at Aitape (1964–1989). Surgical services at Hoyabia, Balimo Hopital, and Togoba in the Western Highlands, with the team led by Dr Bill Ramsay (1965–1968). Medical centre built at Mapoda (circa 1968). Supporting Public Health Department in Southern Highlands developing screening and treatment, led by Alex and Pam Packet (1970–1979). More recently, vocational training is provided in parallel to rehabilitation.	
South Sudan	In what then Anglo-Egyptian Sudan, the Australian auxiliary responded to a need for shelter for people living with leprosy in buildings for leprosy patients in the riverside town of Melut.	
Tanzania	Hospital administration for Diocese of Central Tanganyika leprosy Centre at Hombolo (1979–1985). Establishing the All Africa Leprosy and Rehabilitation Centre at Addis Ababa in 1965, later known as ALERT.	
Timor-Leste	Improved Leprosy Services in partnership with TL Ministry of Health, including early detection program, in Baucau and Manatuto, developing technicians to provide diagnostics in 15 health centres (2019–2024).	
Thailand	Manarom OMF Hospital became new base for itinerant ministry for Dr Grace Warren (1975–1989). Dr Trevor and Heather Smith led McKean Rehabilitation Centre in Chiang Mai, (1969–2009) from where ran a surgery project in Laos.	
Uganda	Leprosy treatment and surgery at Kumi Hospital, led by Geoff and Ruth Bowman (1989–1997) then Nathan Zweck (1993–1996).	
Vietnam	One of the first AusAID supported projects, shared with the Institute of Dermatology in Hanoi (2005+).	

=== Range of care ===
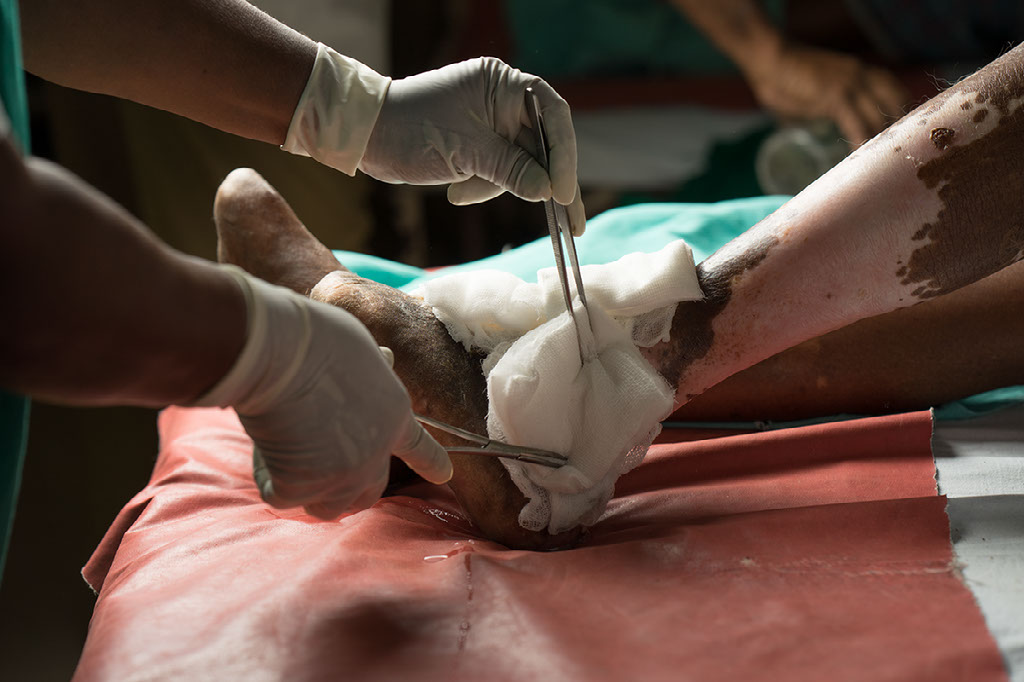
Ulcer and wound care in India

TLMA's work encompasses a wide spectrum of care, including medical treatment, rehabilitation, education, and advocacy. Most projects provide early diagnosis, treatment, and care for those affected by the disease. This is regarded as crucial since early detection and treatment are key to preventing the debilitating effects of the disease. Programs include multi-drug treatment, shown to cure the disease within 6 to 24 months.

Funding these international programs has always been a priority, so these projects "have the best Australia can give", to use the phrase of its early advocate, Bishop George Chambers. For healthcare professionals in Australia's Christian community, the mission has also been a conduit for service overseas. In this way, many Australians have provided patients with physiotherapy, reconstructive surgery, and other forms of rehabilitation. This aspect of TLMA's work addresses the physical and psychological impacts of leprosy, enabling people to rebuild their lives. In this regard, the charity has been described as one of the earliest disability inclusion organisations. The organisation is shaped by its Christian faith, and so addresses leprosy as both a medical and social issue.

TLMA raises awareness about leprosy, its symptoms, and available treatments through educational programmes and campaigns. This includes educating communities about how the disease is both preventable and treatable. TLMA's educational efforts aim to empower individuals and communities with knowledge about leprosy, facilitating early diagnosis and treatment. Advocacy plays a crucial role in raising the profile of leprosy on national and international agendas, ensuring adequate funding and resources for its eradication.

=== Organisation and partners ===
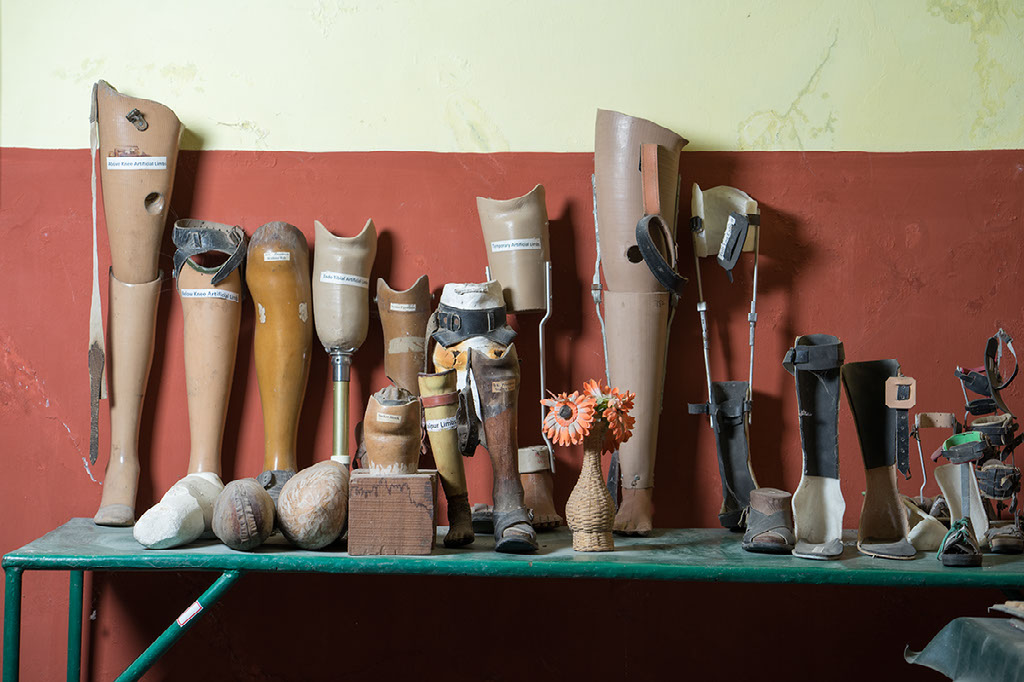
Artificial limb workshop at Arumugam Sridhar

The charity is registered with the Australian Charities and Not-for-profits Commission and accountable to that body. As such, it has been endorsed by the Australian Government as a Deductible Gift Recipient (DGR). The work of the mission is accredited by Department of Foreign Affairs and Trade.

TLMA works closely with other mission partners, such as the Netherlands charity, No Leprosy Remains, in joint projects in Indonesia. It is a member of the Australian Council for International Development, the Australian NGO Cooperation Program of Australian Aid, the Fair Trade Association of Australia and New Zealand, the Fundraising Institute of Australia and the Australian Disability Consortium.

While the mission does attract some government funds through Australian Aid, the great majority of funding for its projects come from private donors, raising $2.9 million in 2023. Through its history, the mission has encouraged a great variety of fundraising activities, including regular giving, cycling sponsorships, street appeals, events, and extreme-distance walking.

== History ==
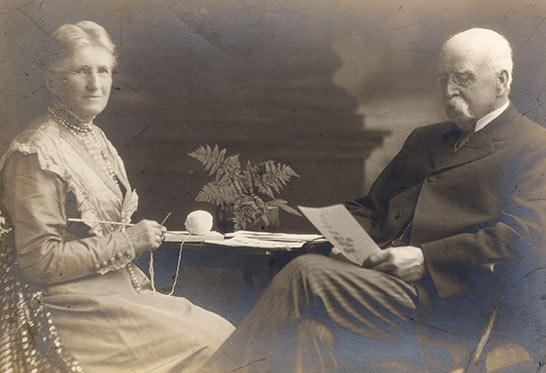
Wellesley and Alice Bailey

Inspired by the work of the leprosy mission pioneer Wellesley Bailey, Horace Hannah began a correspondence with the Irishman. Bailey replied by giving the Melbourne banker the challenge of organising an Australian auxiliary for the new movement.

Hannah did so, selecting secretaries for each of the states. Wellesley sailed from China to join Hannah for the first official meeting, which convened on 8 July 1913 in Melbourne, chaired by Rev A C Kellaway. On the day, 23 people passed a resolution for a committee to represent the mission in Australia. Hannah would later become president and honorary treasurer, and continued in leadership roles until his death in 1958.

The executive function of the mission—which at this time was known as the Mission to Lepers—was performed by the secretaries. In 1922, the General Secretary, Rev Walter Eddy, traveled to New Zealand to establish an auxiliary there.

=== Fundraising ===
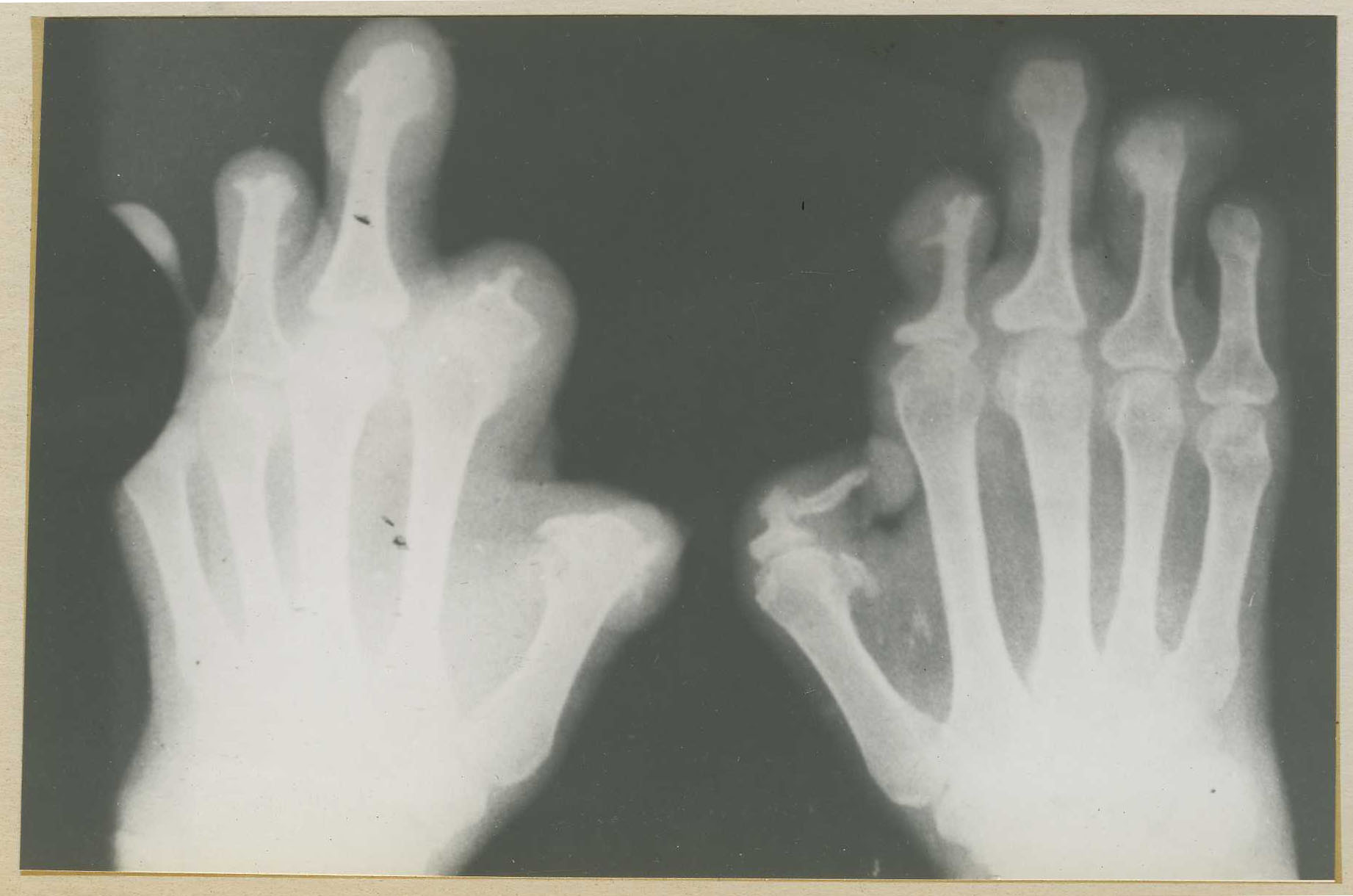
X-ray of patient in Chiang Mai, Thailand, a project long supported by Leprosy Mission Australia

The focus, from the beginning, was on fundraising for overseas leprosy missions, and prayer to support the efforts of the missionaries. In 1918, J Noble Mackenzie asked the Australian auxiliary if they would raise funds for a Leprosy Mission in Korea, led by Dr. C. H. Erwin; which would require 500 pounds. The sum was raised in the AGM of that year. In 1922, the committees raised sufficient money to provide buildings for leprosy patients in Melut, in partnership with Sudan United Mission.

Budgets built steadily, which stood at 4,410 pounds by 1924. In the following years, 1,000 pounds were allocated for the Foochow leprosy mission in China, then 400 pounds for the enlargement of a church at the Champa Mission Station in Chhattisgarh, India. Perhaps more impressively, total income for the group grew to 6,475 pounds by 1930, well into the Great Depression. By 1944, it had reached 20,000 pounds.

Imaginative approaches to fundraising have marked out the Australian operation, which were driven by local chapters. The Taree TLM auxiliary, which first met in 1954, was known for producing elaborate musicals and cake competitions. In the 1960s it was producing its own radio show on 3XY and later on 3SH, along with its own magazine, In Action, and, in 1971 its own TV special, "Freedom from Bondage." The approach has continued in the 21st century. One fundraiser auctioned off the colourful football shorts of Matthew Primus, the captain of the Port Adelaide Football Club. And with the support of David Wenham—who starred in the film Molokai, about a missionary who served and died in a leprosy mission—TLMA became a sponsor of Sydney Film Festival, allowing them to show short films about their work.

=== Field workers ===
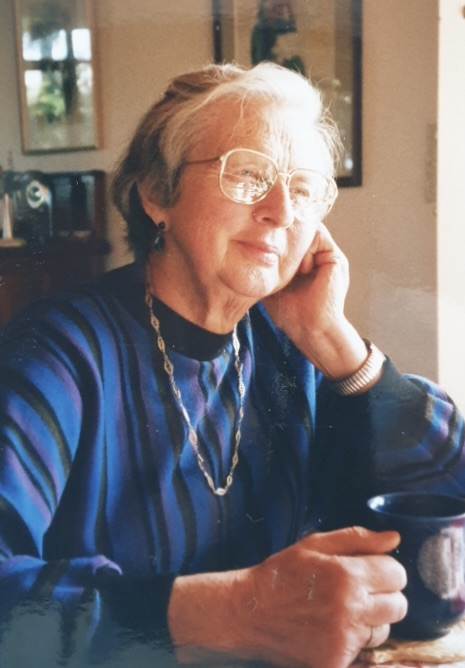
Tendon transfer pioneer, Grace Warren

Following the Billy Graham crusades in Australia 1959, the group saw an influx of talent, both in leadership and among medical staff. William McKeown, a new convert, became the executive secretary that year. Grace Warren began her first stint with the group at this time, and would go on to lead surgical teams, train many other specialists and pioneered the technique of tendon transfer in reconstructive surgery for leprosy patients with Paul Brand. With new techniques and systems, they arranged a fresh medical team to serve in New Guinea of Dr Ken Clezy, Julie Christie a physiotherapist from NZ, theatre sister Val Taylor. That team, on the day after arriving in PNG, operated on eight cases of leprosy; with over 500 operations on hands, feet and faces in the following nine months.

The nature of the mission's work changed radically in the 1980s with the launch of effective multi-drug treatment, distributed free from the WHO. One of its researchers, the microbiologist, Jenny Davis, was now describing the fight against leprosy as being one of the medical success stories of the 20th Century.

By 2003, TLMA was responsible for several groups of not just medical, but allied health students, who began visiting projects in the Democratic Republic of the Congo, Papua New Guinea, Nigeria, Nepal and India. The mission had developed its partnership with AusAID by 2011, enabling 23 projects. But with infections entirely treatable, focus was now on prevention, rehabilitation and advocacy. In this way, they have become leaders disability inclusion, globally.

Countries where Leprosy Mission Australia serves as of 2023

Through a partnership between The Leprosy Mission Nigeria and The Leprosy Mission Australia, DFAT and the Australian High Commission in Nigeria an electoral reform was effected, which made it possible for people who aren't able to provide a fingerprint—particularly those with hands damaged by leprosy—were able to register and vote in the 2023 Nigerian presidential election. For the leadership of the mission, the advocacy work indicated the mission is keeping to its original principles: “The Christian principle of seeking the outcast is a big principle of The Leprosy Mission – no one is outcast in the kingdom of God.”

== Current and previous leadership ==
=== Chairs ===
- H. J. Hannah (1913–1958)
- P. E. Turnbull (1958–1961)
- P. L. Turnbull (1961–1982)
- Ian Milne (1982–1990), later Chair of The Leprosy Mission International (1990–1996)
- Russell Conway (1992–1995)
- Jenny Davis (2000–2013)
- Colin Martin (2014–2019)
- Steven Meredith (2019–2022)
- Jennifer Ward (2022 - current)

=== National leadership ===
- W. J . Eddy, Secretary (1913–1931)
- A. E. Blackwell, Secretary (1931–1932)
- F. A. Crawshaw, Secretary (1934–1945)
- R. Edgar, Secretary (1946–1963)
- Richard McKeown, Executive Secretary (1963–1976)
- Bill Edgar, Executive Secretary (1977–1980)
- Ken Martin, Executive Secretary (1980–1990) who later served as President of International Federation of Anti-Leprosy Associations, the Vice Chairman of TLMI then the Chairman (2013–2017).
- Ken Martin, National Director (1981–1990) later Chair of LMI (2013–2017)
- David Whiting, National Director (1990–1993)
- Gordon Combs, National Director (1993–1994)
- Stuart Brown, CEO (1994–2006)
- Graham Peck, CEO (2006–2015)
- Sheldon Rankin, CEO (2015–2023)
- Greg J Clarke, CEO (2023+)

=== Noted doctors, nurses, scientists ===
In the early 20th Century, doctors and nurses who served in were known as medical missionaries, later as field workers. Leprosy Mission Australia, has supported many Australians as overseas staff who have become internationally known for their work.

- Prof Warwick Britton AO, immunologist, established Mycobacterial Research Laboratory at Anandaban
- Betty Cunnington, country director for PNG
- Jenny Davis, microbiologist, past chair
- Helen Fernandes, deputy chair, served in Nigeria, community development and disability advocate
- Maggie Mead, nurse, who served in DRC through three wars.
- Helen Nixon, occupational therapist, became financial comptroller for programs in India, PNG, Nepal, Congo, Nigeria, Thailand and China.
- Jim and Robyn Nottingham, working with Dyak people of Kalimantan, Indonesia
- Yuek Ming Poon, 22 years service, including Nepal, India, Country leader in China and Lao, PNG, returning to Nepal
- Anne Roberts (Ethiopia), Anne is a physiotherapist with experience working in the field of leprosy in India and Ethiopia. She has a Masters in Medical Education.
- Dr Paul Roche AM, immunologist and epidemiologist,
- Helen Rientis, nursing instructor Bhutan
- Heather and Trevor Smith, educator and physician
- Natalie Smith, disability advocate and country leader for Timor-Leste
- Dr Grace Warren, surgeon, served and taught throughout Asia from 1964 to retirement
- Janet Walmsley, director, LMI
- Elisa Yule, occupational therapist, project leader, Nepal
