= Bloomfield Hospital (Ireland) =

Hospital in Ireland dating from 1812

Geography
- Location: Rathfarnham, Ireland
- Coordinates: 53.272°N 6.305°W

History
- Founded: 1812

Links
- Website: bloomfield.ie
- Lists: Hospitals in the Republic of Ireland

Bloomfield Hospital is a not-for-profit healthcare provider in Rathfarnham providing a mental health service. It was formerly known as The Retreat at Bloomfield. The hospital was significantly redeveloped in the 2000s.

== History ==
The hospital was founded in 1812 by the Religious Society of Friends (Quakers). An AGM report from 1827 shows several members of the Pim family on the committee, with James Pim, later to be heavily associated with the Dublin and Kingstown Railway, as Treasurer.

Developers made arrangements with the Religious Society of Friends to redevelop the hospital and provide a meeting house for the Quakers whilst retaining some of the old buildings.

== Sources ==
- Committee (1827). State of an Institution at Bloomfield, near Dublin, called the Retreat, for Persons afflicted with Disorders of the Mind (Report). Dublin: Bentham & Hardy.
