= Pym =

Pym or PYM may refer to:

== People ==
- Pym (surname)

== Fictional characters ==
=== Marvel Comics ===
- Hank Pym, known as Ant Man, Giant Man, Goliath, Yellowjacket and the Wasp
- Hope Pym, known as the Red Queen
- Maria Pym, known as SODAM and MODAM

=== Other characters ===
- Morgan Pym, a character in The Collector
- Arthur Gordon Pym, protagonist of The Narrative of Arthur Gordon Pym of Nantucket by Edgar Allan Poe
- Magnus Pym, a character in A Perfect Spy by John le Carré

== Other uses ==
- Pym (novel), a novel by Mat Johnson
- Philadelphia Yearly Meeting, an organizing body for Quaker meetings
- Pacific Yearly Meeting, an organizing body for Quaker meetings in parts of Mexico and the western United States
- Palestinian Youth Movement, an international Palestinian leftist organization
- Plymouth Municipal Airport (Massachusetts)

== See also ==
- Pim (disambiguation)
