= The Leprosy Mission =

International non-governmental organization

- Founded: 1874
- Founder: Wellesley Bailey
- Type: Non-Government Organisation
- Purpose: Treatment, rehabilitation and support for people with leprosy
- Location: Brentford, United Kingdom (Global HQ)
- Region served: 27 countries (2025)
- Method: Medication, surgery, advocacy, education and awareness
- Director: Brent Morgan
- Chair: Fiona Davidson
- Revenue: £40 million (2023)
- Website: www.leprosymission.org

The Leprosy Mission (TLM) is an international and inter-denominational Christian medical organisation focused on the treatment and eradication of Hansen's disease, commonly known as leprosy. Their operational focus is on healthcare delivery, rehabilitation, advocacy, and rights-based approaches in endemic communities. It began as a response to the suffering of people with Leprosy in India by an Irish teacher in the late 19th Century. After 150 years of medical research and outreach, the disease is today both treatable and preventable. The organisation now works with global partners towards zero leprosy transmission, zero disability, and zero discrimination for people affected by the disease.

== Global operations ==
The Leprosy Mission works through a Global Fellowship, composed of Members and Affiliates from 27 different countries. It is organised into four global areas of operations, some which focus implementing leprosy work, others which concentrate on raising funds.

=== 1. Europe ===
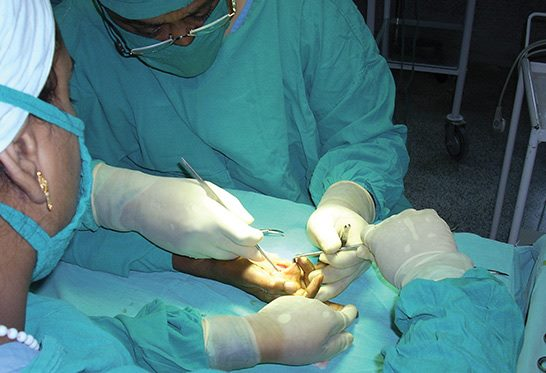
A leprosy patient receives restorative hand surgery in India

The Leprosy Mission lists Belgium Denmark Finland France Germany Great Britain Hungary Netherlands Northern Ireland Norway Sweden and Switzerland as either members or affiliates in its Global Fellowship. These are focused on raising funds for the global work.

=== 2. Africa ===
TLM has teams in Chad, DR Congo, Ethiopia, Mozambique, Niger and Nigeria. It directly operates its own hospitals in many of these countries, where the lines of effort are on active case detection, training people for self-care groups, and outpatient care integrated with clinical services.

=== 3. Asia ===
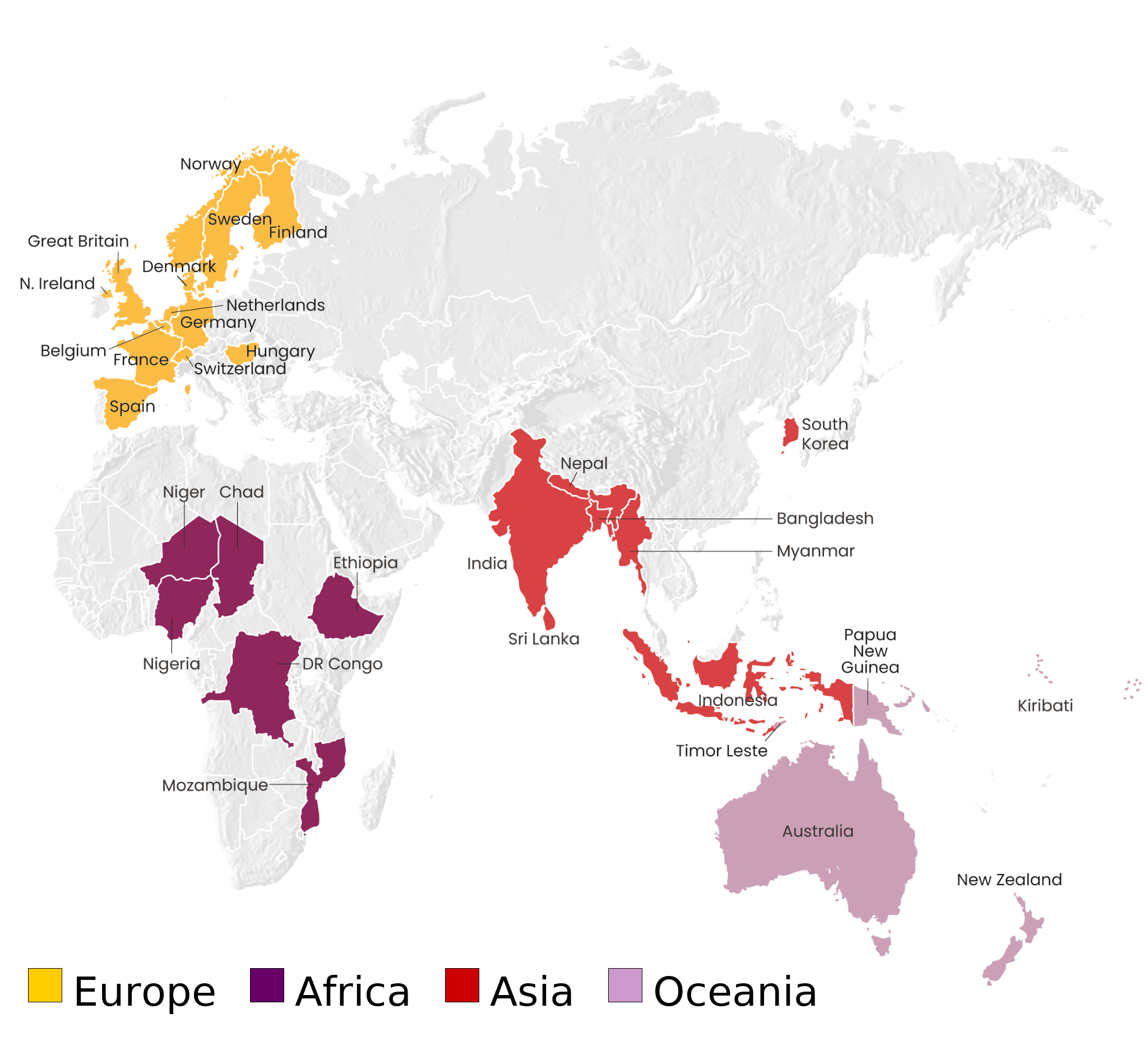
Countries where the Leprosy Mission is active as of 2025

Across Asia, TLM operates in Bangladesh, East Timor, India, Myanmar, Nepal and South Korea. Here, they partner with specialist hospitals and clinics, deliver surgery and ulcer care, operates large outpatient services and patient helplines, conduct clinical research, and support community outreach along with disability-inclusion projects.

=== 4. Oceania ===
In Oceania, the Leprosy mission implements health programs in Papua New Guinea. The national committees in Australia and New Zealand primarily focus on generating support.

According to its 2023 Annual report, members and supporters of The Leprosy Mission raise approximately GBP 40 million each year to sustain global operations.

== Areas of work ==
=== Hospitals and healthcare ===
The Leprosy Mission owns 14 hospitals in India, one in Bangladesh, and one in Nepal. TLM-affiliated hospitals provide specialist tertiary care, including reconstructive surgeries, along with the treatment of leprosy itself. They also serve as centres for training, both for doctors and paramedics, in matters such as early detection.

Once trained, local doctors and nurses at these hospitals treat ulcers and leprosy reactions, providing counselling, mental health support, and health education, much of which also forms the basis for medical research. They also provide reconstructive surgery, physiotherapy, assistive devices, and special footwear. In 2022, 1,335 people underwent reconstructive surgery with The Leprosy Mission. Allied health professionals, connected to centres such as in Nigeria and Myanmar, serve in mobile prosthetic units in that provide medical care to those who have lost their limbs. All of this is designed to enable people affected by leprosy towards self-reliance and independence.

The Leprosy Mission also supports a number of hospitals in Asia and Africa that are owned by the government or local church. For example, the Mawlamyine Christian Leprosy Hospital in Myanmar and the Qua Iboe Church Hospital in Ekpene Obom partners with Leprosy Mission for surgical support. Equally, Nigerian state owned hospitals in the states of Kano, Sokoto and Niger States also work in partnership with TLM for medical treatment resources.

=== Community-based rehabilitation ===
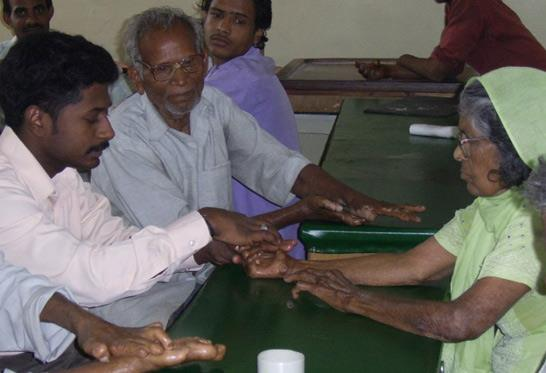
An occupational therapy clinic in India

People affected by leprosy are often socially ostracised, which prevents them from being able to participate in the economic, social, and political life of the society in which they live. This is despite the disease now being proven to be easy to treat in the early stages and difficult to catch even from close contact.

To tackle this issue, The Leprosy Mission supports community-based rehabilitation programmes, particularly across Asia and Africa. This work includes promoting inclusive development, skills training, micro-finance, self-help groups, low-cost housing, self-care groups, and supporting Disabled People's Organisations. Self-help groups have been proven to reduce the experience of stigma, increase well-being, and enhance household economic performance. The Leprosy Mission also campaigns to end legal discrimination against people affected by leprosy and encourages community support for those affected. A good example of this has been community‑based rehabilitation in Nepal which has involved small‑scale grants for businesses and scholarships for leprosy‑affected individuals.

=== Training and education ===
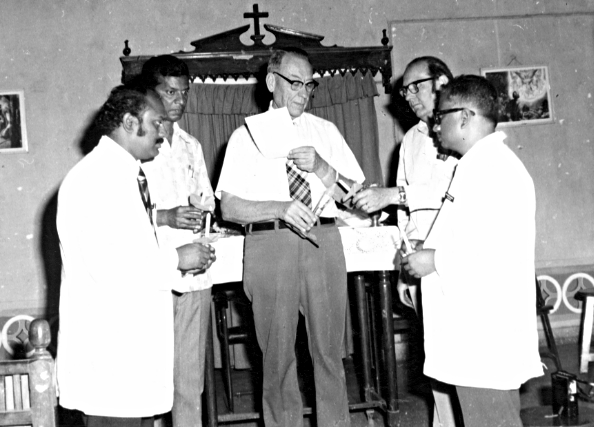
Graduation of paramedics in Northern India, 1977

Historically, The Leprosy Mission has been closely linked—through partners and affiliate institutions—to training a wide range of healthcare workers. A leading example is through The Leprosy Mission Trust India, whose hospitals are recognised by government, not only for reconstructive surgery and rehabilitation, but for training of doctors, allied health professionals, cascading down to frontline staff.

Leprosy is found predominantly in countries where poverty is widespread, and correlates with low education, food insecurity, poor housing, and lack of sanitation. To help prevent poverty amongst the leprosy community, The Leprosy Mission provides education to people affected by leprosy, offering formal education and literacy classes.

For school-age children, The Leprosy Mission will provides support to help them to stay in school and finish their school education. In a 2024 project in Bangladesh, 100 students from vulnerable families affected by leprosy were sponsored to pursue higher education and they, in turn, provided free coaching services to 498 primary and high school students as well as non-formal education to 210 adults. For adults in Africa, The Leprosy Mission has supported programs offering vocational training in computing, agriculture, car mechanics and printing.

The Leprosy Mission, as part of its work within the International Federation of Anti-Leprosy Associations, conducts training programmes for general health care workers. These sessions are designed to strengthen early recognition of the clinical signs of leprosy, ensure correct administration of multi-drug therapy (MDT), and thereby reduce the risk of further transmission within communities.

Partner organisations also engage in community awareness campaigns. For example, in Mozambique (through the "Mission Zero" project) and in India (Chhattisgarh), efforts have focused on increasing local leprosy awareness, reducing stigma, and promoting early detection. Additionally, World Leprosy Day campaigns—organised by ILEP's member institutions—serve as nationally and internationally visible platforms for public education on leprosy.

=== Advocacy ===
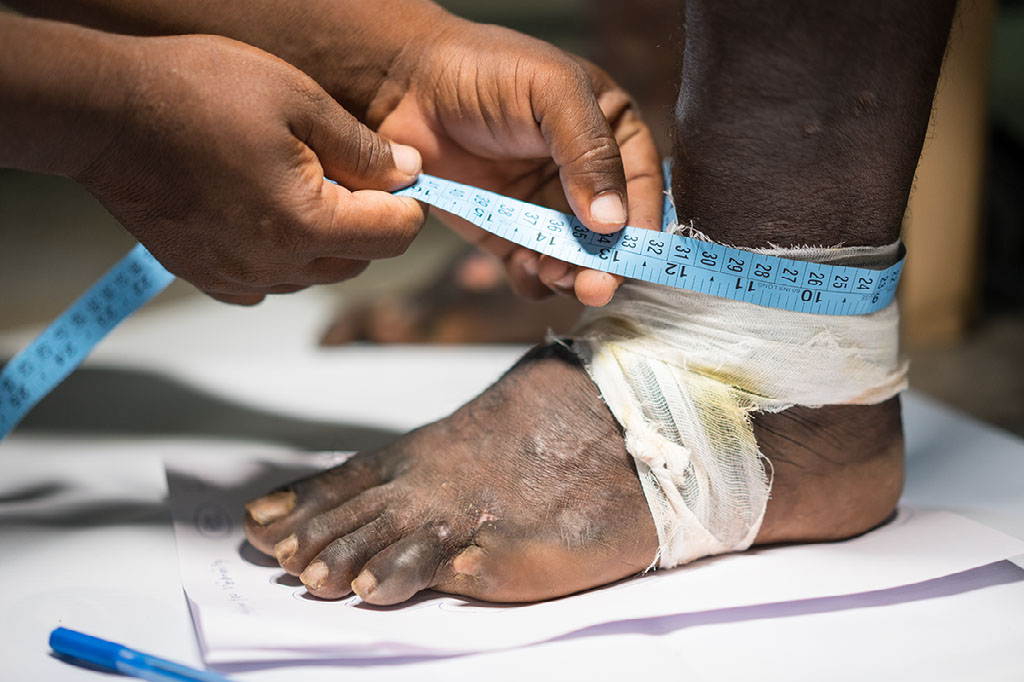
A patient being treated in Cuddalore District, India

Advocacy has been shown to reduce stigma and raise community awareness, which, in turn, encourages people to seek treatment for leprosy earlier. The Leprosy Mission works with people affected by leprosy so that they can advocate both for awareness of the condition, for their rights, and to ensure they face fewer physical and social barriers, as well as removing legal barriers to participating in society. The advocacy of the partner movement in India led to repeals of archaic laws where leprosy was grounds for divorce.

TLM and its partners advocate with communities by creating and supporting self-help groups. This is demonstrated to increase the health literacy and confidence of participants. Under community leadership; over time, this shifts from NGO-led advocacy to self-advocacy by people affected by leprosy—a pattern evidenced in Nepal and India and reinforced by legal-rights advocacy. The program in Chhattisgarh, India, was shown to encourage women to become more self-sufficient, including participation in the workforce, along with successful reforms to local government.

The Leprosy Mission has worked with the United Nations to pressure member states to protect the rights of people affected by leprosy. This advocacy is based on the UN Convention on the Rights of Persons with Disabilities. At the national level, TLM works with national governments to ensure that leprosy receives the appropriate time, attention, and resources. These activities aim to press governments to repeal discriminatory laws and to follow UN Human Rights Council and General Assembly guidance on ending leprosy-related discrimination.

The Leprosy Mission also advocates for sustained government support, as reductions in leprosy cases have led governments to prematurely declare the crisis resolved. However, once funding is removed, resurgences in transmission have followed.

Ensuring access to MDT (multi-drug therapy) is a focused area of activity for TLM. In Nigeria, a stated concern is for "leprosy patients who belong to the poorest of the poor are not able to access this life-saving medication." Here, advocacy begins within the local health systems, ensuring early recognition of the clinical signs of leprosy, and that multi-drug therapy is provided.

=== Research ===
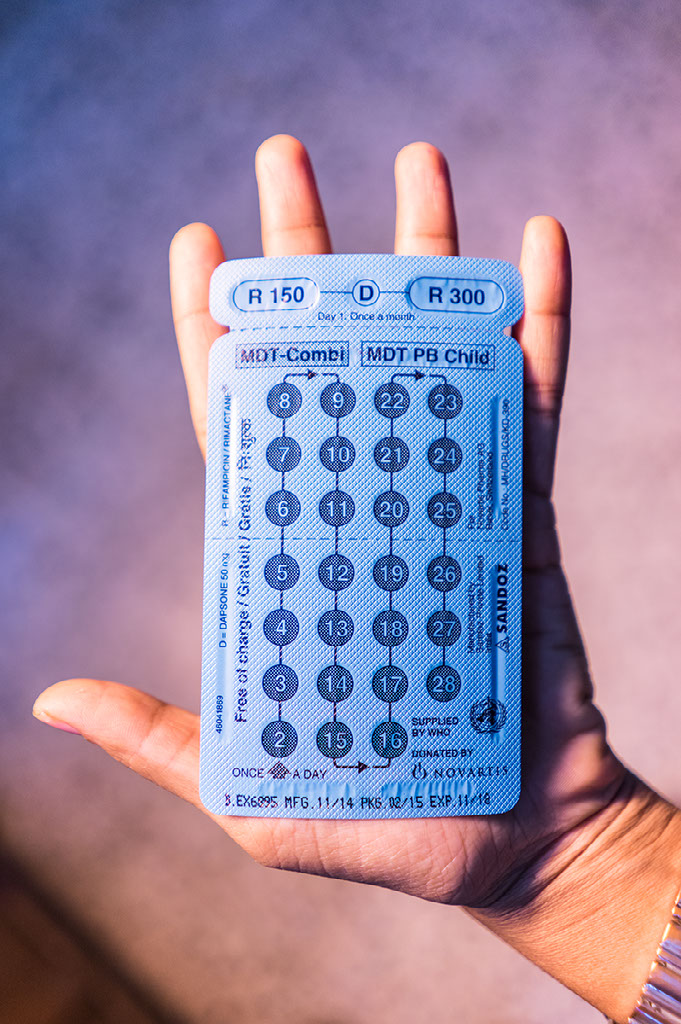
Research in the 1950s led to Multidrug Therapy, now a cornerstone of healthcare strategies for leprosy

The Leprosy Mission's commitment to research spans decades, with its community of clinicians delivering key treatment breakthroughs in the 1960s to 1980s.

Dr Paul Brand and his wife Dr Margaret Brand joined the staff of The Leprosy Mission in 1953, going on to lead a dedicated research team for 30 years. The Brands pioneered the discovery that the loss of fingers and toes amongst people with leprosy was, in fact, due to infection and therefore preventable. He went on to innovate reconstructive surgery for leprosy-related disability, largely working in TLM partnered hospitals in India.

Stanley G. Browne was a lifelong medical missionary and later medical consultant to The Leprosy Mission. A prolific scientist, he publishing "some 500 articles" across leprosy and tropical medicine. Working with Dr John Lowe, also serving with the Mission, Browne made early therapeutic investigations into the use of sulfone drugs, such as dapsone, which were found could stop Mycobacterium leprae from multiplying. In the 1950s, Browne conducted therapeutic trials of clofazimine. It proved effective both as an anti-microbial and as an anti-inflammatory agent, particularly helpful in controlling erythema nodosum leprosum (ENL), a painful leprosy reaction. Both these drugs were later incorporated into multidrug therapy which is regarded as "the principal catalyst for achieving grew from trials combining rifampicin, dapsone, and clofazimine. In the view of the World Health Organization, this multi-drug therapy "proved spectacularly effective."

More recent research has gone into drug resistance in leprosy resulting from genetic mutations in bacterial strains. Around 70% of people affected by leprosy may struggle with mental illness (anxiety or depression), so The Leprosy Mission also works to understand the link between leprosy and personal wellbeing. Research continues in the Mycobacterial Research Laboratory in Anandaban Hospital, Nepal, at the Rural Health Programme, Nilphamari, Bangladesh, and at the Stanley Browne Laboratory in New Delhi, India.

== Strategy and goals ==
Leprosy is a curable disease and if cases can be diagnosed and treated early enough, the disabilities associated with leprosy can be avoided. The Leprosy Mission continue to reduce the number of new leprosy cases, working toward zero cases by 2035. Their research program aims to learn more about giving an early diagnosis, monitoring relapse, and anti-microbial resistance. The Leprosy Mission will also use new technology to support primary and secondary healthcare workers. TLM partners with governments and other leprosy NGOs to identify active cases in the community, then implement contact tracing, and raise awareness amongst local people.

In 2024, Leprosy Mission marked 150 years of fighting leprosy. The Leprosy Mission began with Wellesley Bailey and his wife Alice having regular meetings in Dublin to tell friends about their experiences of people affected by leprosy in India, and to raise money.

Bailey, a Christian from Ireland, had been working as a teacher in the Punjab in India. During this time he had come across a row of huts inhabited by men and women with serious disabilities and physical deformities. His friend Dr Morrison, a leader of the American Presbyterian Mission in Ambala, explained that they were suffering from leprosy. Bailey was shocked by what he saw. Afterwards he wrote:

I almost shuddered, yet I was at the same time fascinated, and I felt that if there was ever a Christ-like work in the world it was to go amongst these poor sufferers and bring them the consolation of the gospel.

In its early decades, the mission was funded by thousands of small denomination donations. While individual donations remain key to its finances, the organisation receives substantial funding from government agencies, such as the Foreign, Commonwealth and Development Office in the UK and Department of Foreign Affairs and Trade in Australia.

== History ==
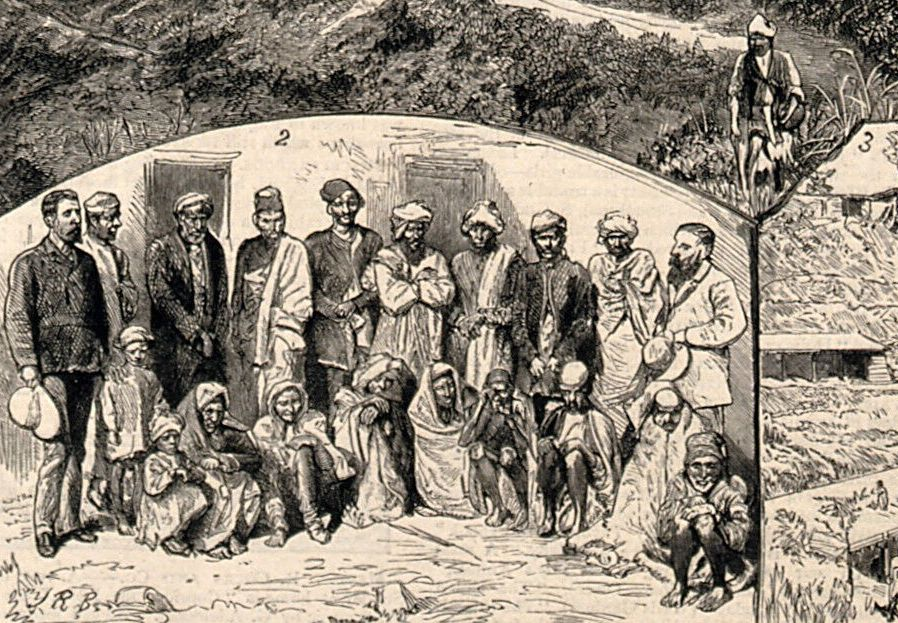
Nineteenth Century Wood engraving of missionaries and patients at the Lepers Mission in India

The Leprosy Mission was founded by an Irish teacher, Wellesley Bailey in 1874. Over time, its missionary-run leprosy asylums emerged as hybrid institutions—healthcare delivery centres shaped by global medical advances—particularly tropical medicine—and religious caregiving models. Religious care was the primary motivation for Bailey, as he compared the helplessness of the sick with "the way sinners have to come to God and get His blessing". Originally known as the Mission to Lepers in India, the organisation had 10 asylums and supported 8 others by 1893; in 1899 it maintained 19 asylums, and aided many others. Largely, the work spread according to the presence of the British Empire, though it would also come to serve in China and Thailand.

1874–1893 – The Baileys travel extensively in India to see the need of people affected by leprosy and to encourage support work and donations, and establish a clinic in Punjab to bring medical relief to leprosy patients.

1891 – Wellesley Bailey visits Mandalay, Burma, to open the first MTL home for leprosy-affected people outside India.

1891 – mission in Hangzhou, in Zhejiang, China, established on Saint Andrew's Day. This later extended to seven centres in Fujian, then in Guangdong. By 1914 this extended further to missions in Shandong. A colony established in Dajin Island, in the South China Sea, was funded by the American Mission to Lepers, who also supported an initiative at Stone Gateway, Yunnan. In 1920 an HQ for the work in China was created in Shanghai. The Leprosy Mission began a partnership in 1925, including a building program for medical training facilities, with Shantung Christian College, later known as Cheeloo University.

1910s – The Mission has extended its work throughout India and the Far East and now has 87 programmes in 12 countries, with support offices in eight countries, including the auxiliary which would become Leprosy Mission Australia.^{.}

1930s – MTL began to develop into a medical mission with the vision to help eradicate leprosy. In 1930 it was working in 100 centres across 15 nations, though most of their work was in India.

1940s – In South India, Paul Brand pioneers medical research and reconstructive surgery on leprosy deformities in hands and feet.

1940s-50s – The first effective cure for leprosy, Dapsone, is introduced. Over the next 15 years, millions of patients are successfully treated.

1950s – TLM's work is extended into Africa.

1954 – World Leprosy Day is founded by Raoul Follereau, a French writer, to make sure that people everywhere know that leprosy still exists and is completely curable. It is held each year on the last Sunday in January.

1960s – Leprologists work to discover new drugs that are effective against leprosy as many people are discovered to have Dapsone-resistant leprosy.

1965 – Group changes its name from 'The Mission to Lepers' to 'The Leprosy Mission' to avoid the negative connotations of the word 'leper,' which is now understood to be a derogatory word'

1970s – TLM begins to extend its work from hospitals to rehabilitative and outreach efforts involving families and communities, self-help groups, and home-based education, especially in India.

1980 – Vincent Barry and his team win the 1980 UNESCO Science Prize for their discovery of anti-leprosy drug clofazimine, developed with the assistance of The Leprosy Mission.

1981 – World Health Organization (WHO) recommends a new combination drug treatment for leprosy, MDT (Multi Drug Therapy). People are cured in as little as six months.

1986 – Leprosy Mission Nigeria established in 1986, to see "Zero Transmission of Leprosy, Zero Disabilities caused by leprosy and Zero Discrimination of persons affected by leprosy and disabilities".

1990s – As many more people are cured, caring for people with lasting disabilities through social, economic, and physical rehabilitation becomes increasingly important.

2011 – According to its own history, after 130 years Leprosy Mission moved away from a centrally-directed regional structure and reformulates as a more decentralised Global Fellowship, the Members of which signed the TLM Charter.

2017 – The organisation sets a new goal: to see no new cases of leprosy by 2035. This goal was agreed upon by the Members of TLM's Global Fellowship members, including Australia.

2019 – A new global strategy is launched with three priorities: 1) Zero leprosy transmission by 2035; 2) Towards zero leprosy disability; 3) Towards zero leprosy discrimination, as declared in Nigeria and other partner nations.

2024 – The Leprosy Mission celebrates its 150th anniversary and prepares to launch a new global strategy.

== Sources ==
- Turnbull, P.L. (1990). A Lifetime of Caring: The Leprosy Mission in Australia.
