= Pimm =

Pimm is a surname, and may refer to:

- Ed Pimm (born 1956), American racing driver
- Jack Pimm (1920–2016), Australian rules footballer
- James Pimm (1798–1866), English caterer, inventor of Pimm's liqueur
- Jerry Pimm, American basketball coach
- Pat Pimm (1957–2024), Canadian politician
- Stuart Pimm (born 1949), American ecologist
- William Pimm (1864–1952), British sport shooter

== See also ==
- Pim (surname)
- Pimm's, liqueur or cocktail made with it
