= David Warren (inventor) =

Australian inventor of the flight data recorder and cockpit voice recorder

David Warren AO
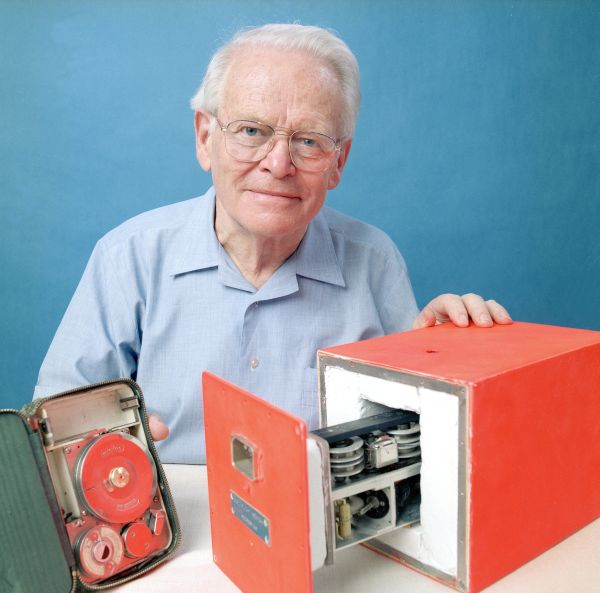
- Warren with a prototype of a black box
- Born: David Ronald de Mey Warren; 20 March 1925; Groote Eylandt, Northern Territory, Australia
- Died: 19 July 2010 (aged 85); Melbourne, Victoria, Australia
- Education: University of Sydney; Imperial College London; University of Melbourne
- Known for: Flight data recorder, cockpit voice recorder, "the black box"
- Family: Grace Warren (sister)
- Scientific career
- Workplaces: Defence Science and Technology Organisation

1985 ABC news report interviewing Warren about his invention.

David Ronald de Mey Warren AO (20 March 1925 – 19 July 2010) was an Australian scientist, best known for inventing and developing the flight data recorder and cockpit voice recorder (also known as FDR, CVR and "the black box").

== Early life ==
David was born to Reverend Hubert and Ellie Warren and was one of four children. He was born on a remote mission station on Groote Eylandt in the Northern Territory, becoming the first white child born on the island. He was educated at Launceston Church Grammar School in Tasmania and Trinity Grammar School in New South Wales.

In 1934, his father was killed in the crash of the de Havilland D.H.86 Miss Hobart over Bass Strait.

David went on to earn a Bachelor of Science degree with Honours from the University of Sydney, a PhD in fuels and energy from Imperial College London, a Diploma of Imperial College, and a Diploma of Education from the University of Melbourne.

== Career ==
Summary

- 1944–46 – Teacher of mathematics and chemistry, Geelong Grammar School, Victoria.
- 1947–48 – Lecturer in chemistry, University of Sydney.
- 1948–51 – Scientific Officer, Woomera Rocket Range and Imperial College, London.
- 1952–83 – Principal Research Scientist, Aeronautical Research Laboratories, Melbourne, (now part of the Defence Science and Technology Organisation).
- 1981–82 – Scientific Adviser (Energy) to the Victorian State Parliament.

From 1952 to 1983, David Warren served at what is now the Defence Science and Technology Organisation's Aeronautical Research Laboratories in Melbourne ultimately attaining the role of principal research scientist. It was there, while investigating the 1953 crash of the world’s first commercial jet airliner — the Comet — that David conceived the idea of the cockpit voice recorder. The catalyst: a miniature voice recorder he saw at a trade show.

As he later reflected, “If a businessman had been using one of these in the plane and we could find it in the wreckage and play it back, we'd say, ‘We know what caused this.’” Captured audio—ambient sounds, spoken words, mechanical anomalies—could yield direct insight into a disaster’s origin.

At the time, devices existed to log certain flight parameters, but they were single-use, lacked voice capability, and were unsuitable for standard commercial operations. David’s innovation introduced magnetic tape, enabling continuous erasure and re-recording—a functional leap that made the device viable for routine aviation use. More crucially, his addition of cockpit audio extended the scope of black box data beyond instruments. In many cases, it was not the crew’s final words but incidental sounds—alarms, engine noise, even silence—that cracked the code of fatal crashes. David’s voice recorder didn’t just preserve memory—it changed the very grammar of accident investigation.

== Committees, honours, awards and recognition ==
Warren was the chair of the Combustion Institute (Aust & NZ Section) for 25 years (1958–83), the founding chair of the Morris Minor Car Club of Victoria (1977-2002), as well as committee member of the Chemical Society, the Institute of Fuel, and the Australian Institute of Energy.

Warren received many awards and honours, including The Australian Institute of Energy Medal (1999), the Hartnett Medal of the Royal Society of the Arts (2000), the Centenary Medal (2001), the Lawrence Hargrave Award of the Royal Aeronautical Society (2001), Officer of the Order of Australia (AO) (2002), and the ICAO Edward Warner Award (2016).

=== Recognition ===
In November 2008, Qantas named one of their Airbus A380s after Warren in honour of his services to aviation.

Warren died on 19 July 2010, aged 85, in Melbourne. He was buried in a casket bearing the label "Flight Recorder Inventor; Do Not Open" (a play off of the "FLIGHT RECORDER DO NOT OPEN" label on his recorders).

In June 2012, the ACT Government named a road, David Warren Road, in the suburb of Hume.

David Warren was inducted into the Australian Aviation Hall of Fame on 16 November 2013.

On 25 March 2014, the Defence Science and Technology Organisation renamed their Canberra headquarters the "David Warren Building".

On 20 March 2021, Google showed a Doodle on its home page in some countries for David Warren's 96th birthday.
