= Wellesley Bailey =

Wellesley C. Bailey (1846-1937) was the founder of the international charity The Leprosy Mission. In India, in the 1860s, he witnessed the severe consequences of the disease and vowed to make caring for those struggling with leprosy his life's work. The Mission is still active today.

== Early life ==
Wellesley Bailey was born in Ireland in 1846. He grew up in Abbeyleix, Queens County (now County Laois) where his father was an estate manager for the Cosby family. He and his three brothers attended boarding school at Kilkenny College.

During his childhood, Ireland was in the midst of the Great Famine. Over one million people emigrated from Ireland during the late 1840s. North America and the colonies were the favored destinations of those who could afford to leave. Baily dreamed of finding a new, more promising life, in distant lands and in 1866 he set out to find his fortune in the goldfields of Australia. He was unsuccessful and returned to Dublin three years later. A few months later, he sailed to Faizabad in northern India to join his brother in the Indian police force

== Christian faith ==
Although Bailey had attended a Church of Ireland church as a child, he had not taken the Christian faith seriously. As he left Gravesend to sail to Australia, fog delayed the departure of his ship. A childhood girlfriend had asked him to attend a church whenever he could, and he used the time to visit Gravesend Parish church. There, he says he had a sense of God's presence in a way he'd never known before and he committed his life to Christ.

== First visit to India ==
When Bailey reached Faizabad in 1869, his brother had been moved to the north west of the country and he found himself alone. He put aside his original intention to join the police and began to learn Hindi. He lodged with an old German Lutheran missionary who was able to teach him the local language. At this time he began to feel that God was calling him to missionary work and he applied to work with the American Presbyterian Mission. They accepted him and sent him as a teacher to one of their schools in Ambala in the state of Punjab, north India.

The leader of the American Mission in Ambala was Dr. J.H. Morrison. Bailey began to hear from his colleagues about how Dr. Morrison 'looked after some beggars who were lepers'. At this point, he had no idea what this meant as he had only heard about leprosy and 'lepers' from Bible stories. Dr Morrison invited him to visit the beggars' huts with him and Bailey was quite shocked when he saw the people's clawed hands and disfigured faces.

Afterwards, he wrote:

'I almost shuddered, yet I was at the same time fascinated, and I felt that if there was ever a Christlike work in the world it was to go amongst these poor sufferers and bring them the consolation of the gospel.'

While Bailey had been in India, he had been corresponding with the childhood girlfriend, Alice Grahame, who had encouraged him to go to church. In one letter he proposed marriage and they became engaged. In 1870 Alice sailed to India and they were married later that year in Bombay Cathedral. Unfortunately the dry heat of the Punjab affected Alice's health badly. Two years after she arrived it was clear that she would not be able to maintain a good quality of life in India; Bailey resigned from the American Mission and together they returned to Ireland.

== Creation of the 'Mission to Lepers' ==
Having to return to Ireland was a deep disappointment for Bailey. He used his time in Ireland to talk to people about the problems faced by those with leprosy in India.

In 1874 friends of the Baileys, the Pim sisters, invited them to stay with them in Dublin. The sisters then invited some of their friends to join them and asked Bailey to describe his work with leprosy-affected people. For many people this was the first time they had heard about modern leprosy.

A larger venue than the Pims' sisters living room was found and Bailey talked about his work to a wider audience. He explained to people about some of the financial needs: 'For as little as £5 an adult leper can be cared for in an asylum, and a child for much less than that.' Bailey's talks were also produced in booklet form, entitled Lepers in India. It soon sold out and had to be reprinted. The Pim sisters hesitantly agreed to try and raise £30 a year for leprosy work in India.

Alice's health had significantly improved and the couple were able to return to India in 1875. Bailey had been appointed a lay-missionary with the Church of Scotland. Initially, he focused on preaching and spent his spare time working for patients with leprosy, using some of the funds sent over to India by the Pim sisters to build shelters. His divided loyalties caused tension between Bailey and the Scottish Mission. In 1878 he was given permission to take a month's leave and he returned to Ireland.

When Bailey was in Ireland, the Mission to Lepers became properly formalised. He reported that the mission was caring for about 100 leprosy-affected people, mostly in north India. Charlotte Pim informed the new committee that they were raising about £900 a year. Bailey was appointed the first secretary and treasurer to work from India.

The Baileys and their three children went back to India in 1879. At this stage, he was still combining his work for the Church of Scotland Mission with his unpaid work as secretary for the Mission to Lepers.

In 1882, Alice's health again became fragile. The Scottish Mission board ordered them home and took Bailey off their missionary lists. Later that year the Baileys moved to Edinburgh where he took up a position as secretary of a charity that worked with women in India. He continued his work with the Mission to Lepers and as the income continued to increase, it became possible to extend the work further.

In 1886, he published A Glimpse at the Indian Mission Field and Leper Asylums.

In 1886, Bailey gave up his post with the Scottish charity and was appointed full-time secretary of The Mission to Lepers in India. That same year, he and Alice set off for a tour of India to see for themselves the vast needs of those with leprosy throughout the whole country. They did not return until the spring of 1887.

== The growth of the Mission ==
Bailey's tour of India had highlighted to him how great the need for The Mission to Lepers work was. He had witnessed other missionaries' attempts to care for those with leprosy, often without the support of their Mission organisation. When he visited projects, Bailey was seen as the expert and also a source of financial support. Steadily, income to the Mission to Lepers grew. Three 'auxiliaries', or fundraising bases, sprung up in England (in Brighton, Cheltenham and Bolton).

Bailey and Alice returned to Scotland in 1887 and he began to concentrate on growing the Mission. Letters were arriving from different centres in India asking for support for leprosy work. Up until this point, Bailey had focused solely on India. Up until this point, he had focused solely on India but a letter arrived from Mandalay in Burma asking for help. The Mission to Lepers responded by providing funds for the building of a home for those with leprosy. By 1891, China was added to the list of countries that The Mission to Lepers was working in.

In 1891, he published The lepers of our Indian empire: a visit to them in 1890-91.

In 1892 he toured the US and Canada speaking about his work with patients with leprosy.

In 1905 he became superintendent of the mission.

In 1913 Bailey embarked on what was to be his last voyage to visit the work that The Mission to Lepers had started. Bailey and Alice journeyed through China, then on to New Zealand, Australia, the Philippines, Japan, Korea, back to China and then on to Malaysia, Singapore and India. During this tour he gave over 150 addresses, met with many government officials and visited leprosy homes everywhere.

When World War I broke out in 1914 Bailey's son, Dermot, was killed in the fighting.

== Retirement ==
In 1917, at the age of 71, Bailey retired from his work with the Mission. At that time, the Mission to Lepers was working with over 14,000 leprosy-affected people in 12 countries.

In one of his last speeches before his retirement, he said: 'The Mission has been born and cradled in prayer. It has been brought up on prayer; it has been nourished on prayer; and prayer has been at the bottom of its success since the first moments of its life.'

His granddaughter later wrote about him: 'He was not a saint, nor even a clever man... But I do not ever remember hearing from him an ungenerous remark, or seeing him angry apart from minor irritations. His great gift was single-mindedness, and a simplicity that perhaps could not see the difficulties which a more sophisticated mind might see.'

Wellesley Bailey died in 1937, aged 91.

== Wellesley Bailey's impact on leprosy work ==
Before the birth of the Mission to Lepers, support for leprosy work was not very high on people's agendas. Bailey saw a huge need when he first visited the leprosy huts in Ambala and set about raising awareness of the plight of those with leprosy, which subsequently raised financial support allowing the work to grow and continue.

In 1965 The Mission changed its name from 'The Mission to Lepers' to 'The Leprosy Mission' to avoid the negative connotations of the word 'leper'. The Leprosy Mission exists to this day.

In 1999, the Leprosy Mission created the Wellesley Bailey Awards. These honour people who have overcome the social stigma and physical challenges of leprosy and made extraordinary contributions to society.
