= Grace Warren =

Australian surgeon and missionary

Grace Warren AM
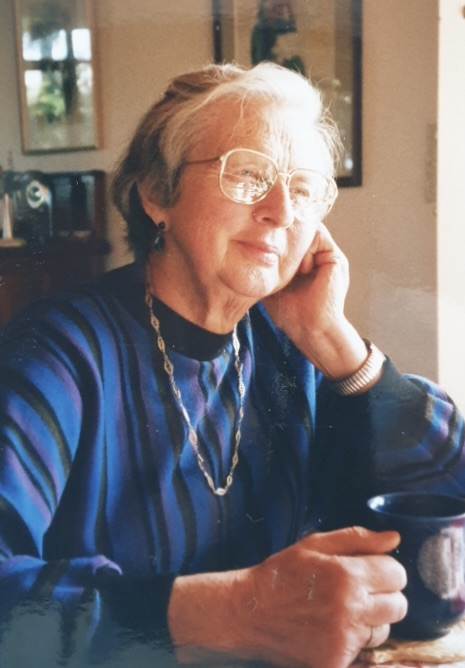
- Grace Warren in 1999
- Born: Agnes Grace Warren; 1929 (age 96–97)
- Education: University of Sydney
- Known for: Leprosy care and treatment
- Relatives: David Warren (brother)
- Medical career
- Profession: Surgeon and researcher
- Research: neuropathic limbs
- Notable works: Warren, Grace; Hicks, Lesley. Doctor Number 49: Grace Warren of The Leprosy Mission. ISBN 9780646970264.

Grace Warren AM (born 1929) is an Australian doctor known for her work in the area of leprosy care and treatment, especially in Asia.

== Early life ==
Warren was born in 1929 in Sydney, New South Wales. Her parents were Anglican missionary Hubert and Ellie Warren. She was one of four children. An older sibling was David Warren. Their father was killed in a plane crash into Bass Strait in 1934.

== Medical career ==
Warren's first education was in obstetrics, the only surgical discipline open to women in the 1950s at the University of Sydney. She then earned a Diploma of Tropical Medicine and spent 18 months at a women's hospital run by the Australian Presbyterian Mission at Pusan in South Korea. She had developed interest in treating leprosy, so her next position was at the leprosy hospital on Hayling Chau island in Hong Kong. She became permanent staff in 1962 having become an expert in the treatment of deformities caused by leprosy. She submitted her research to the University of Sydney and was awarded a Master of Surgery in 1972. When the Hei Ling Chau Leprosy Hospital closed in 1975, she continued to work throughout Asia on behalf of Leprosy Mission Australia. She worked by visiting leprosy hospitals and teaching all staff to use what they had available, rather than sending a senior medical officer away from the hospital to a Leprosy Teaching Center. She officially retired in 1989, but continued to operate overseas for months each year until 2012. She also shared her experience at hospitals in Australia for treating other forms of neuropathy, such as caused by diabetes. She continued to consult into her mid-eighties. She identified Paul Brand as a mentor, due to his earlier work on leprosy treatment in India, they both sought to reduce the stigma that leprosy is a life-long disease.

Warren became a Fellow of the Royal Australasian College of Surgeons in 1977, at which time she advocated that Australia should follow World Health Organization recommendations to treat leprosy the same as other infectious diseases, instead of specific laws about leprosy.

Warren received an honorary degree of Doctor of Medicine from the University of Sydney on 2 May 1985.

== Community ==
Warren was created a Member of the Order of Australia in the 1986 Australia Day Honours for her international work on leprosy. She was awarded the Star of Pakistan in 2006.

Warren is the namesake for Warren House at William Clarke College in northwestern Sydney.

Doctor Number 49: Grace Warren of The Leprosy Mission is an autobiography published in 2006.
