= Dalkey Atmospheric Railway =

First commercial atmospheric railway (1843-1854)

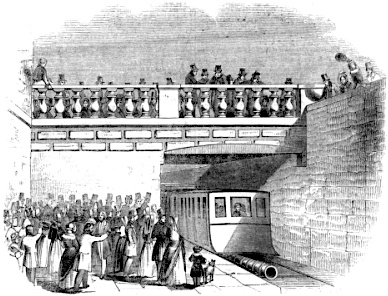
- Arriving at Kingstown, The Illustrated London News, 6 January, 1844

Overview
- Dates of operation: 19 August 1843–12 April 1854
- Successor: Dublin and Wicklow Railway

Technical
- Track gauge: 1,435 mm (4 ft 8 1/2 in)
- Length: 9,200 feet (2,800 m)

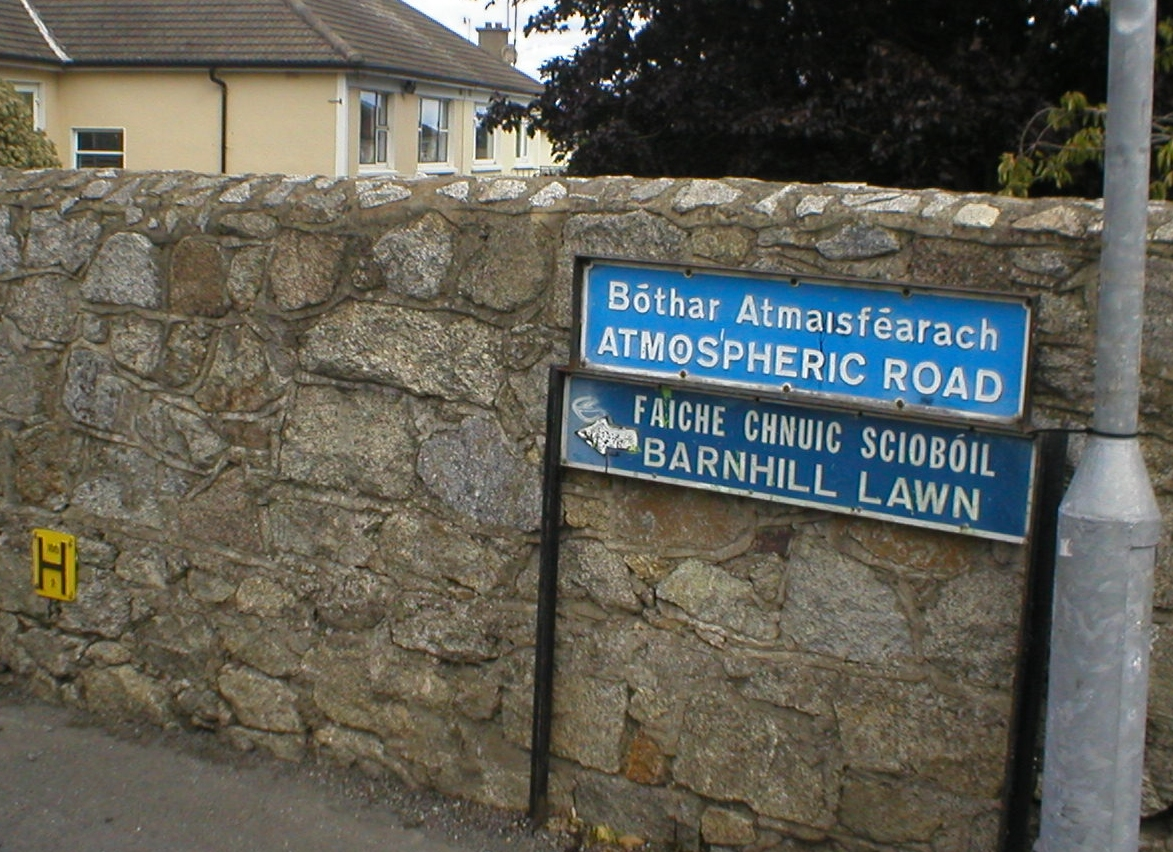
Former location of Dalkey atmospheric station & pump house

The Dalkey Atmospheric Railway (unofficial opening 19 August 1843, official opening 29 March 1844 – 12 April 1854) was an extension of the Dublin and Kingstown Railway (D&KR) to Atmospheric Road in Dalkey, County Dublin, Ireland. It used part of the Dalkey Quarry industrial tramway, which was earlier used for the construction of Kingstown (Dún Laoghaire) Harbour. It was the first commercial atmospheric railway in the world.

== History ==
Following a patent in 1839 Samuel Clegg and the Samuda brothers had set up a demonstration of an atmospheric railway at Wormwood Scrubs in England. The directors of the Dublin and Kingstown Railway were impressed by the system and determined it would be a suitable means to extend their existing line from Kingstown to Dalkey. James Pim (Junior), the treasurer (Note: Murray in 1981 notes that while James Pim (Junior) held the post of "treasurer" he functioned more as a "general manager" of later eras, in the 2000s his actions might be more typically that of a chief executive officer.) of the Dublin and Kingstown Railway, became an enthusiastic supporter of the atmospheric system and began preparations to extend the railway to Dalkey using that system. In an 1841 letter to Right Hon. Lord Viscount Morpeth, Pim indicated he expected the extension to cost £15,000, and should the system fail the loss was expected to be no more than £7,500.

The standard gauge line was 9,200 feet (2,800 m) in length with an average uphill gradient of about 1 in 110. Vacuum power via a 15-inch (380 mm) pipe was used for the ascent to Dalkey, speeds of up to 40 mph (64 km/h) being achieved, and the return journey was by means of gravity. The vacuum tube fell 560 yd (512 m) short of the Dalkey station, and the train relied on momentum for the last stretch of the journey. To commence the journey to Kingstown the train had to be pushed by hand until the piston engaged with the tube. The success of the railway led to reports that plans were drawn up in 1843 to extend the line to Bray, however this did not come to fruition.

William Dargan was the contractor and Charles Vignoles the engineer. The atmospheric equipment was supplied by Samuel Clegg and Jacob and Joseph Samuda. The vacuum was provided by a 100 hp (75 kW) single-cylinder steam engine at Dalkey. This was a condensing engine with steam supplied at 40 psi (280 kPa). The steam cylinder was 34.5 in (88 cm) in diameter and the air pump 67 inches diameter, both with 5.5 ft (1.7 m) stroke and capable of 22 strokes per minute. This engine was claimed to be suitable for a 6-mile stretch of railway, and was therefore lightly loaded.

Trains ran every half-hour between 8:00am and 6:00pm. Some clue as to the size of the trains can be obtained from the study carried out from the French Government in 1843 A train of 38 tons gross weight was described which comprised 7 carriages and carried 200 people, and in subsequent tests train weights of up to 70 tons are reported. The journey to Dalkey could be completed in just over 3 minutes with the speed being limited by the need to brake for curves on the line, and speeds of over 40 mph (64 km/h) could be reached.

The last atmospheric train ran on 12 April 1854. By this time issues with the atmospheric system had been demonstrated elsewhere and it had been proved, despite the inclines, that a small locomotive such as Princess could work the line if necessary. The D&KR had agreements to become involved in a scheme to reach Wexford and legislation dictated that was to be at the standard (Irish gauge) of 1,600 mm (5 ft 3 in) and logistics also indicated conventional locomotive haulage for the Kingstown to Dalkey section. The handing over of the section to the Dublin and Wickow Railway (D&WR) was the first part of that process. (Note: The D&WR had begun operating Dalkey to Bray on 10 July 1854. The D&KR had essentially determined some years previously their best option was to lease the D&KR to the 3WS, the Great Western Railway backed predecessor to the D&WR.)

== Incidents ==
Frank Elrington, son of Charles Richard Elrington, was in a single carriage that had been uncoupled from its train and unknowingly engaged to the pipe at Kingstown when the pumping engine started up. The journey to Dalkey was claimed to have been completed in 75 seconds at an average speed of 84 miles per hour (135 km/h).

== Influence on other railways ==
In August 1844 the line was visited by Isambard Kingdom Brunel and other representatives of the Great Western Railway. They subsequently constructed the 20 mi (32 km) South Devon Railway which operated for a year with atmospheric propulsion.

In November 1843 the French Government sent Mons. Mallet to conduct a detailed study of the railway (including measurements made with Joseph Samuda). The extensive report was sufficiently favourable to lead to the construction of the 5.3 mi (8.5 km) Saint-Germain atmospheric railway near Paris, which was built in 1847 and operated until 1860.

Robert Stephenson also reported in 1844 to the Chester and Holyhead railway on an extensive series of tests he devised for the line, which were carried out on his behalf by Mr G Berkley, and Mr W.P. Marshal. Stephenson looked at the applicability of the atmospheric system to a variety of purposes, from inclines to main line, and concluded that it only had economic advantage compared to rope incline or locomotive hauled on short lines (e.g. 3 to 5 miles length) having light trains with frequent departures, especially where the gradients precluded the use of locomotives.

== Aftermath ==
A section of the pathway forms part of the DART route. The last 200 metres, or so, at the Dalkey end ran slightly to the north of the modern line and became derelict or built over. The bridge which carried Castle Park Road over the atmospheric railway is still in existence and everyday use. The pumping station was sited in the grounds of a house which still stands beside the path called 'The Metals' adjacent to Barnhill Road.

== See also ==
- Atmospheric railway

== Notes, references and sources ==
=== Sources ===
- Lyons, Garrett (15 October 2015). Steaming to Kingstown and Sucking Up to Dalkey: The Story of the Dublin and Kingstown Railway. Dublin: Londubh Books. ISBN 978-1907535772.
- Murray, Kevin (March 1943). "The Atmospheric Railway to Dalkey". Dublin Historical Record. 5 (3). Old Dublin Society: 108–120. JSTOR 30080115.
- —— (1981). Ireland's First Railway. Dublin: Irish Railway Record Society. ISBN 0-904078-07-8.
- Pim, J. (Junior) (1841). "Irish Railway: The Atmospheric Railway". Letter to Right Hon. Lord Viscount Morpeth. London: J. L. Cox & Sons. OCLC 975409185.
- Shepherd, Ernie (1974). The Dublin & South Eastern Railway (1974 ed.). David and Charles. ISBN 0715363611.
