= Raymond Pim =

American farmer and politician from Iowa (1897–1993)

Raymond Thompson Pim (January 23, 1897 – May 14, 1993) was an American farmer and politician.

Raymond Pim was born to parents Frank Lessig and Kate Thompson Pim on January 23, 1897. The family farm was located near Lucas. Pim graduated from his hometown high school, served in the United States Army during World War I with the rank of first lieutenant, then earned a degree from Iowa State College in 1920. He raised Hereford cattle, held membership within the Lucas County Farm Bureau, which he served as vice president and president, was active in the Iowa Association of Local Creameries, and helped found the Lucas County Co-operative Creamery, serving as its president from 1946 to 1952. Pim was also president of the local school board. Pim, a Republican, was elected to the Iowa House of Representatives from District 16 in 1952 and 1954.

Pim was married to Carolyn Deyo from 1925 to her death in 1981. The couple raised two children. He died at the Rosewood Care Center in Moline, Illinois, on May 14, 1993.
