= Roland Pym =

British artist and theatrical designer (1910–2006)

Roland Vivian Pym (12 June 1910 – 12 January 2006) was a British painter, illustrator and theatrical designer. Known for his elegant romanticism, Pym's work celebrated fashionable London society as well as country life, and drew comparisons to the more prominent Rex Whistler.

== Early life ==
Born in Cheveley, a village just outside Newmarket, Pym was the son of Sir Charles Pym and his wife Violet Catherine, only daughter of Frederick Lubbock, of Emmetts, Kent, a son of Sir John Lubbock, 3rd Baronet, and his wife Catherine Gurney, daughter of John Gurney of Gurney's Bank. His grandfather was Horace Pym, and he was a great-great-grandson of Admiral Sir Samuel Pym.

Pym and his parents moved to Brasted in Kent when he was a young child, after his father inherited the family home, Foxwold. After education at Ludgrove and Eton, he studied at the Slade School of Art and specialised in theatre design, with Osbert Lancaster (two years his senior) as one of his fellow students.

== Work ==
Active as a mural painter, Pym completed a pre-war commission for Bryan Guinness, 2nd Baron Moyne at his home in Biddesden, which marked the start of a long friendship and various other murals and illustrations produced for the Guinness family, many of which appeared in the children's books authored by Guinness, including The Story of Johnny and Jemima (1936), The Children in the Desert (1947) and The Story of Catriona and the Grasshopper (1958).

After war service in the Royal Artillery, Pym enjoyed his heyday as a theatrical designer when he was hired by Binkie Beaumont to create sets and costumes for ballets and plays. He also produced set designs for Lohengrin at Covent Garden and Eugene Onegin in Paris. For the coronation of Queen Elizabeth, in 1953, Pym decorated the Queen's Retiring Room at Westminster Abbey. When his stylistic preferences fell out of fashion Pym was able to fall back on murals. His biggest single commission was The Saloon at Woburn Abbey, 1971–1975, in "typical tones of blue and pink", for the Duke of Bedford.

Pym also experienced a late career renaissance as an illustrator when he was commissioned by The Folio Society to work on the Nancy Mitford novels The Pursuit of Love (1991) and Love in a Cold Climate (1992). He followed these with new editions of Edith Sitwell's English Eccentrics (1994) and Thackeray's Vanity Fair (1996).

== Personal life ==
A 'lifelong bachelor', Pym died at Edenbridge, Kent in 2006.
