= Pim Brothers & Co. =

Irish cloth maker and merchant

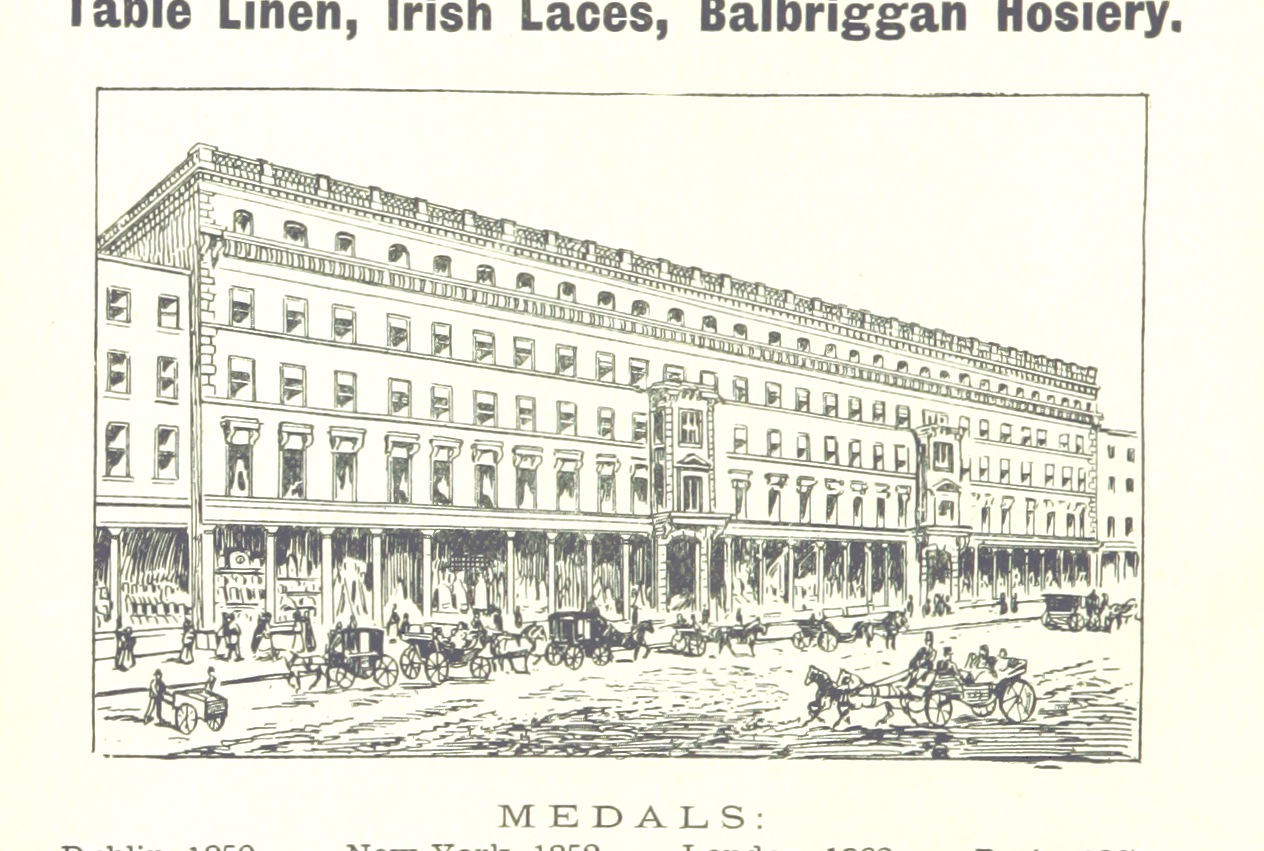
- Type: Private
- Industry: Retail
- Founders: The Pim family
- Headquarters: 75-85 South Great George's Street, Dublin, Ireland
- Area served: Ireland
- Products: Irish poplin, linen and drapers
- Services: Retail, wholesale and Manufacturing
- Owner: Pim Brothers Limited

Pim Brothers & Co. was part of the interests of the Pim Brothers, business entrepreneurs based in Dublin in the first half of the nineteenth century.

== History ==
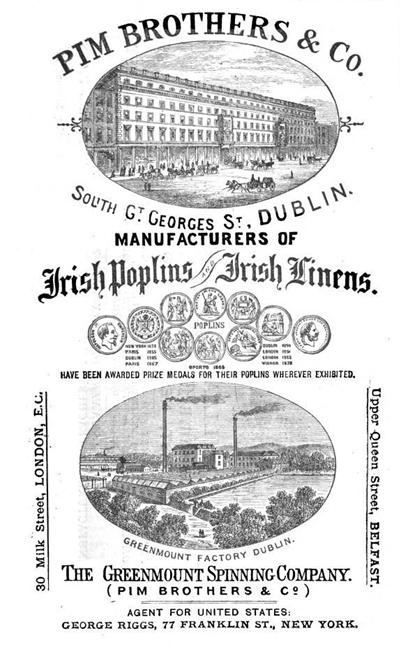
Advertisement of Pim Brothers & Co. depicting the main shop in Dublin and below the Greenmount Factory (1876)

The Pim Brothers were primarily Irish poplin manufacturers and drapers.

It was founded by the Pim family, who were Quakers. Amongst the known partners of the business were Joseph Todhunter Pim, Richard Pim, F.W. Pim, Jonathan Pim, Thomas Pim and John Gilbert.

== Family ==
The Pim family tree of Quakers developed an extensive network of connections supporting their business enterprises. Several family members had the same names resulting in difficulties, and for even experienced historians.

=== Jonathan Pim (1741–1824) ===
Jonathan Pim, born Jan. 28 1741, was the father of James, Thomas, Jonathan and Joseph R. Pim and established himself in Mountmellick. He was the son of Tobias Pim and Susanna Eves.

=== James Pim (1770–1849) ===
James Pim was in business as a manufacturer of poplins and tabinets by 1795 when joined by his brothers Thomas and then Jonathan a little later. (Note: This is not the James Pim (junior) (1796–1856) though there is a family relationship)

=== Thomas Pim (1771–1855) ===
Thomas Pim, one of the original Pim Brothers, was born in 1771 and grew up in the Mountmellick area. His apprenticeship with Joshua Edmundson, a linen draper, finished in 1795. Joining his brother James Pim, a manufacturer of poplins and tabinets, at 69½ Grafton Street sufficient profit was made for Thomas to purchase by 1804 a residence at 22, South William Street. Marriage to Mary Harvey of Youghal ensued in 1806.

=== Jonathan Pim (1778–1841) ===
Jonathan Pim, one of the original Pim Brothers, was born in 1778. He joined James and Thomas at 69½ Grafton Street soon after and married Elizabeth Goff in 1812. Their daughter Elizabeth Pim (1820-1900) married Sir John Barrington who twice served as Lord Mayor of Dublin.

=== Joseph R. Pim (1787–1858) ===
Joseph Robinson Pim, one of the original Pim Brothers, usually referred to as Joseph R. Pim, was born in 1787. He married Hannah Lecky of Cork in 1819. He became involved in marine in a substantial way.

=== Jonathan Pim (1806–1885) ===
Jonathan Pim was born in 1806 as the son of Thomas Pim(1771) and is sometimes referred to as "junior". He came to prominence in the enterprise in the 1840s and was involved in the setting up of the department store in George's Street in the 1850s.

== Enterprises ==
The Pim brothers were involved in a variety of enterprises and levered connections in Cork and Mountmellick.

=== Mercantile activity ===
The Pim brothers were noted in dealing as general merchants dealing in various products including butter, tobacco and cotton. Internationally cotton and associated products were being traded with America.

=== Greenmount Mill ===
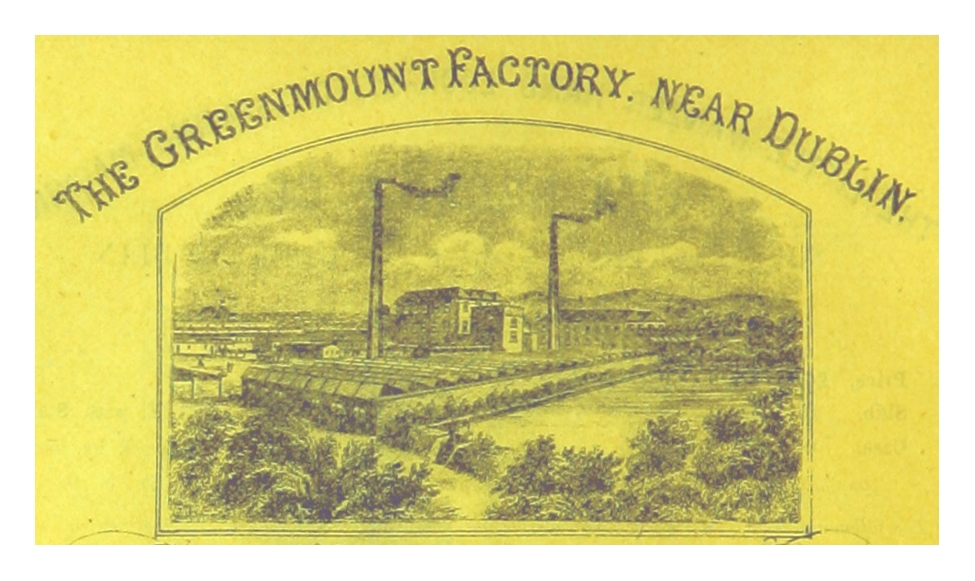
Pim Brother's factory at Greenmount, Harold's Cross, near Dublin

The brothers took over the Greenmount Mill which ran into financial difficulties and seemingly reluctantly became involved in cotton manufacture.

=== Shipping ===
By 1824 the brothers had 3 ships facilitate their international trading interests, The Hibernia, Hannah and Margaret.

=== Department store ===
Their large department store was located at 75-85 South Great George's Street in Dublin, having previously been an Army barracks. It was designed by Sandham Symes and constructed in the 1850s. It was demolished for a modern office building in the 1970s. Another shop was at Exchequer Street. The department store business was purchased by Great Universal Stores in 1955.

== Accolades ==
The company received the Imperial and Royal Warrant of Appointment to the Austro-Hungarian court.

== See also ==
- James Pim (junior), from a related branch of the Pim family, stockbroker the driving force behind the Dublin and Kingston Railway with business links to the Pim brothers
- Jonathan Pim (1858–1949)
- Joshua Pim (1748–1822), the original branch of the Pim family to settle in Dublin

== Sources ==
- Harrison, Richard S. (1987). Dublin Quakers in Business 1800 — 1850 (M.Litt. thesis). Trinity College Dublin. hdl:2262/79673.
- Harrison, Richard S. (2002). "Pim Brothers - Merchants, Manufacturers and Entrepreneurs of Nineteenth-Century Dublin". The Journal of the Friends Historical Society (PDF). 59 (3): 236–256.
