= John Pym (rugby union, born 1891) =

English rugby union footballer (1891–1969)

- Full name: John Alfred Pym
- Born: 25 March 1891 Surrey, England
- Died: 9 February 1969 (aged 77) Auckland, New Zealand

Rugby union career
- Position: Scrum-half
International career
Years	Team	Apps	(Points)
1912	England	4	(3)

John Alfred Pym (25 March 1891 – 9 February 1969) was an English international rugby union player.

Pym was born in Surrey, and educated at Cheltenham College.

A scrum-half, Pym played for Blackheath, Cheltenham and United Services. He was capped four times for England, as their only halfback to play all 1912 Five Nations matches. After contributing a try on debut against Wales, playing beside Adrian Stoop, Pym combined with Harry Coverdale for his next to matches, before resuming his partnership with Stoop for the final fixture.

Pym attended the Royal Military Academy, Woolwich, and served as a lieutenant with the Royal Garrison Artillery in World War I, during which he was falsely reported in the press as having been killed, on account of a confusion with his initials.

== See also ==
- List of England national rugby union players
