= Phosphatidylmyo-inositol mannosides =

Class of glycolipids

Phosphatidylmyo-inositol Mannosides (PIMs) are a family of glycolipids found in the cell wall of Mycobacterium tuberculosis. PIMs influence the interaction of the immune system with M. tuberculosis, and mice that develop antibodies for this family of glycolipids are better at sustaining or defeating a M. tuberculosis infection. Thus, PIMs are important glycolipids associated with M. tuberculosis, but are also likely involved with the process by which M. tuberculosis subverts the immune system.
