= James Pim =

Irish banker and railway pioneer (1796–1856)

- Born: 1796
- Died: 1856
- Occupations: Stockbroker; Insurance agencies; Railway businessman
- Years active: 1820s–1850s
- Known for: Dublin and Kingstown Railway; Dalkey Atmospheric Railway

James Pim (1796–1856) was an Irish stockbroker and banker. He was a major figure in the opening of the first passenger railway in Ireland, the Dublin and Kingstown Railway (D&KR), and the first commercial atmospheric railway in the world, the Dalkey Atmospheric Railway.

== Biography ==
The Railway is the subject of his waking thoughts and nightly dreams. If he thinks of any other subject he thinks of it in connection with the Railway. If his mind is directed towards the recreation of the public, his projects in this respect are in connection with the Railway. If he sees that the amusement of the public can be promoted by any project, he sees it through the Railway glass. If he eats or drinks or sleeps, or provides others with the means of eating, drinking, or sleeping, he does it in connection with the Dublin and Kingstown Railway. He is like the prisoner in ancient Rome, who has a soldier chained to him; the Railway seems to be chained, not to his leg, but to his mind, and it moves when he moves, and he moves where it moves.

— Chairman, D&KR, April 1840

James Pim (1796–1856), often distinguished from his father as junior, originated from a branch of the Pim Quaker family of Mountmellick that moved to Dublin in 1795. His father, James Pim Senior, had corn merchant interests, and was a cousin of Thomas, Jonathan and Joseph Pim.

The appears to be a record to a marriage on 11 November 1823 to Eliza Hogg of Redford, County Tyrone, daughter of Johnathan Hogg, at the Friend's Meeting-house Dungannon.

Pim set up a stockbroking business in 1824, this requiring relatively little capital but would have required personal securities which could have been backed by members of his kin. He acquired the Dublin agency for the Imperial Fire Assurance Company from his father. He began buying stock in the Grand Canal Company when it was available cheaply; building up a holding of £5,600 by 1830, which was available as collateral for other loans. Shepherd notes he was described as "a man of rare ability and was to prove his worth in future negotiations with the Great Western Railway".

An AGM report from 1827 for The Retreat at Bloomfield, a Dublin institution for persons afflicted with disorders of the mind shows James Pim as committee treasurer and several other family and business associates on the committee as directors.

By 1833 James Pim was a partner in Boyle, Low, Bickerstaff and Pim, (Note: This firm also seems to have gone under the name Boyle, Low, Pim and Co. at times) stockbrokers and bankers. (Note: It is of note this have access to private banking facilities) The resources of the firm was later to prove useful in providing working capital for the early stage of setup of the Dublin and Kingstown Railway (D&KR).

Involved with a group looking at a canal transport solutions from Kingstown Harbour to Dublin James Pim was the prominent member of a breakaway section who were aware of the development of the Liverpool and Manchester Railway and stood as guarantor for Alexander Nimmo to perform a survey for a railway alternative.

The act for formation of the D&KR gaining Royal assent on 6 September 1831 and at a meeting of the D&KR committee on 2 December 1831 Pim was appointed Secretary, a position he had held in provisional committee and was noted for taking a disproportionately large share of the burden in obtaining the Act. The D&KR company records of 18 May 1932 records of James Pim: "The present favourable prospects of the company are principally owing to the great personal exertions of James Pim". He was also appointed Treasurer on that date. (Note: According to the Dublin, Wicklow and Wexford Railway's chief engineer Grierson in 1887 Pim used the position of Treasurer to act as General Manager.) The vacant position of "Clerk of the Company" (Note: The modern equivalent would be Company Secretary) was taken by Thomas F. Bergin, an engineer by profession. Bergin oversaw the daily operations of the D&KR and Murray notes Bergin and James Pim "were to make an excellent team".

Pim negotiated a Board of Public Works loan, with a series of letters backed by increasing security guarantees until the loan was forthcoming. During the construction Pim worked with the consulting engineer Charles Blacker Vignoles to smooth out minor construction problems and workmen injuries.

When the D&KR initially raised a bill in 1833 to extend the D&KR to Dalkey there was considerable opposition and a select committee was set up. Pim made some progress when cross-examining opposition witnesses but ultimately the bill had to be dropped. A subsequent 1834 bill for a small extension to Kingstown was successful though Pim had to negotiate carefully with the Admiralty including a possible Compensation Harbour.

In 1840 D&KR officers and directors visited the Clegg and Samuda Brothers demonstration atmospheric railway at Wormwood Scrubbs. Pim became an avid enthusiast and favourable agreements were negotiated to install the world's first commercial system between Kingstown and Dalkey, with trials from August 1843 and public opening in March 1844. The Dalkey atmospheric was to operate moderately effectively albeit not necessarily economically and not without difficulties for ten years. More controversially Pim also put forward a proposal for the Great Southern and Western Railway (GS&WR) Dublin to Cork mainline to be built as an atmospheric railway alongside the Grand, but was severely rebuked by the GS&WR's Sir John Benjamin Macneill who pointed out the engineering impracticalities and conflict of interest an efficient GS&WR would have on the Grand Canal and Pim's stockholding in it.

In the mid-1840s the Waterford, Wexford, Wicklow and Dublin Railway (WWW&DR) start-up, supported by the Great Western Railway (GWR), indicated intentions to build a line from Dublin to Bray and then further South. Ultimately Pim advised the D&KR board they should negotiate terms to lease the D&KR to the WWW&DR and agreements were sealed in three acts in 1846. Ten years later the WWW&DR exercised those rights and the D&KR ceased to be a train operating company.

Pim's health had suffered with negotiations with the GWR in London in 1845 both physically and mentally, though he continued negotiations with the WWW&DR up time of his death with the implementation of the lease to the WWW&DR in 1956. The £1,800 voted to him by the D&KR shareholders on the day of his death went to his widow.

== Family associations ==
Pim's father, James Pim senior, acquired control of the City Quay brewing interest of Richard Pim. Control passed to Henry, brother of James junior before merging into Jameson's.

Other relatives of Pim were also involved with the Dublin and Kingston Railway. Thomas Pim served on the D&KR provisional committee and was appointed chairman of the board of directors on 2 December 1892. Richard Pim initially worked for the D&KR at the Serpentine Avenue, then at Rothwell and Company locomotive builders in England and finally at Grand Canal Street Works where he was responsible for its Princess locomotive. An 1887 report by Grierson indicates a Joseph B. Pim was the secretary of the D&KR at that time.

James and Eliza had eleven children. Isabella, Charlotte and Jane; collectively known as the Pim Sisters were known for their associations with a cholera hospital at 87 Georges Street, Kingstown, and through their friendship with Alice Grahame, fiancé of Wellesley Bailey, did critical fundraising to assist Bailey create The Leprosy Mission. Pim's son Johnathan Greenwood Pim was also involved in railways and was locomotive superintendent on the Waterford and Limerick Railway from 1857 until his contract was not renewed in 1861 and he was replaced by Martin Atock.

== Bibliography ==
- Pim, J. (Junior) (1841). "Irish Railway: The Atmospheric Railway". Letter to Right Hon. Lord Viscount Morpeth. London: J. L. Cox & Sons. OCLC 975409185.

== Sources ==
- Grierson, Thomas B (1887). "The enlargement of Westland Row Terminus Part I". Transactions of the Institution of Civil Engineers of Ireland. 18. Institution of Civil Engineers of Ireland. Archived from the original on 23 July 2019.
- Harrison, Richard S. (1987). Dublin Quakers in Business 1800–1850 (M.Litt. thesis). Trinity College Dublin. hdl:2262/79673.
- Murray, K. A. (1981). Ireland's First Railway. Dublin: Irish Railway Record Society. ISBN 0-904078-07-8.
- Shepherd, Ernie (1974). The Dublin & South Eastern Railway. David and Charles. ISBN 0715363611.
- Shepherd, Ernie (2009). The Atock/Attock Family: A Worldwide Railway Engineering Dynasty. Vol. 150. Oakwood Library of Railway History. ISBN 978-0853616818.
- Mountmellick Development Association (2009). "Quaker Heritage". Mountmellick Development Association. Archived from the original on 22 April 2009.
- Committee (1827). State of an Institution at Bloomfield, near Dublin, called the Retreat, for Persons afflicted with Disorders of the Mind (Report). Dublin: Bentham & Hardy.
- Swindley, Len (2010). "Dungannon Marriages 1823–50". County Tyrone Ireland Genealogy Research. Archived from the original on 10 September 2010.
