= Sir Charles Pym, 1st Baronet =

English politician and Parliamentarian officer (c.1615–1671)

Sir Charles Pym, 1st Baronet (c. 1615 – 1671) was an English politician who sat in the House of Commons from 1641 to 1648 and in 1660. He served in the Parliamentary army in the English Civil War.

Pym was the son of John Pym and his wife, Anna Hooker (or Hooke). He was educated at St Catherine's College, Cambridge and Lincoln's Inn. In 1641, Pym was elected Member of Parliament for Bere Alston in the Long Parliament after the previous member was expelled.

He served in the parliamentary army in the civil war, but was excluded from parliament under Pride's Purge in 1648. He was created a baronet by Richard Cromwell.

In April 1660, Pym was elected MP for Minehead and for Bossiney in the Convention Parliament and chose to sit for Minehead. He lost the seat in 1661.

Pym was pardoned by Charles II shortly before the Restoration, and confirmed in his baronetcy by the King thereafter on 14 July 1663. He remained a Presbyterian.

Pym's only son, Charles, died in 1688 without a male heir; the baronetcy became extinct.

Parliament of England
Preceded by William Strode; Hugh Pollard	Member of Parliament for Bere Alston; 1641–1648; With: William Strode 1641–1646; Sir Francis Drake, Bt 1646–1648	Succeeded by Not represented in Rump Parliament
Baronetage of England
New creation	Baronet (of Brymore); 1663–1671	Succeeded by Charles Pym
