= Charles Pym (British Army officer) =

British Army officer and Chairman of Kent County Council (1879–1971)

Sir Charles Evelyn Pym (11 January 1879 – 13 September 1971) was a British Army officer and chairman of Kent County Council.

The second son of Horatio Noble Pym, of Foxwold, Brasted, Kent, and his wife Sarah Juliet, a daughter of Edmund Backhouse MP, he was educated at Eton College and Magdalen College, Oxford.

Pym was commissioned into the 5th Royal Irish Lancers, in which he was promoted to Captain, then transferred to the Suffolk Yeomanry. He was on active service in the Second Boer War from 1901 to 1902 and during the First World War fought at Gallipoli and in Egypt, 1915–1916; then in France, 1917–1919, being twice mentioned in despatches, and in 1919 was appointed OBE.

Pym was a member of Kent County Council from 1925 to 1965. He was elected a County Alderman in 1935, while he was also Chairman of the Sevenoaks Rural District Council. He was Vice-Chairman of the county council from 1936 to 1949, and finally Chairman from May 1949 to May 1952. When he retired as Chairman, the members of the council presented him with a gold watch.

Pym was a Justice of the Peace for Kent, and in 1943, while serving as chairman of the Sevenoaks bench, celebrated thirty years since he was first appointed. He was also a Deputy Lieutenant for Kent and was knighted in the 1959 Birthday Honours.

In 1905, Pym married Violet Catherine, only daughter of Frederick Lubbock, of Emmetts, Kent, a son of Sir John Lubbock, 3rd Baronet, and his wife Catherine Gurney, daughter of John Gurney of Gurney's Bank. They had three sons and one daughter: John Pym (1908–1993), an army officer and architect; Roland Pym (1910–2006), an artist; Mary Elizabeth Pym (1914–2002); and Martin Jeremy Pym (1919–1981), an officer in the Buffs (Royal East Kent Regiment) and managing director of Hambros Bank.

Pym's wife died in 1927. He survived her until 13 September 1971, dying at the age of 92.

== Honours ==
- Officer of the Order of the British Empire, 1919
- Commander of the Order of the British Empire, 1939
- Commander of the Order of St John of Jerusalem
- Knight bachelor, 1959
