= Joshua Pim (1748–1822) =

Irish merchant (1748–1822)

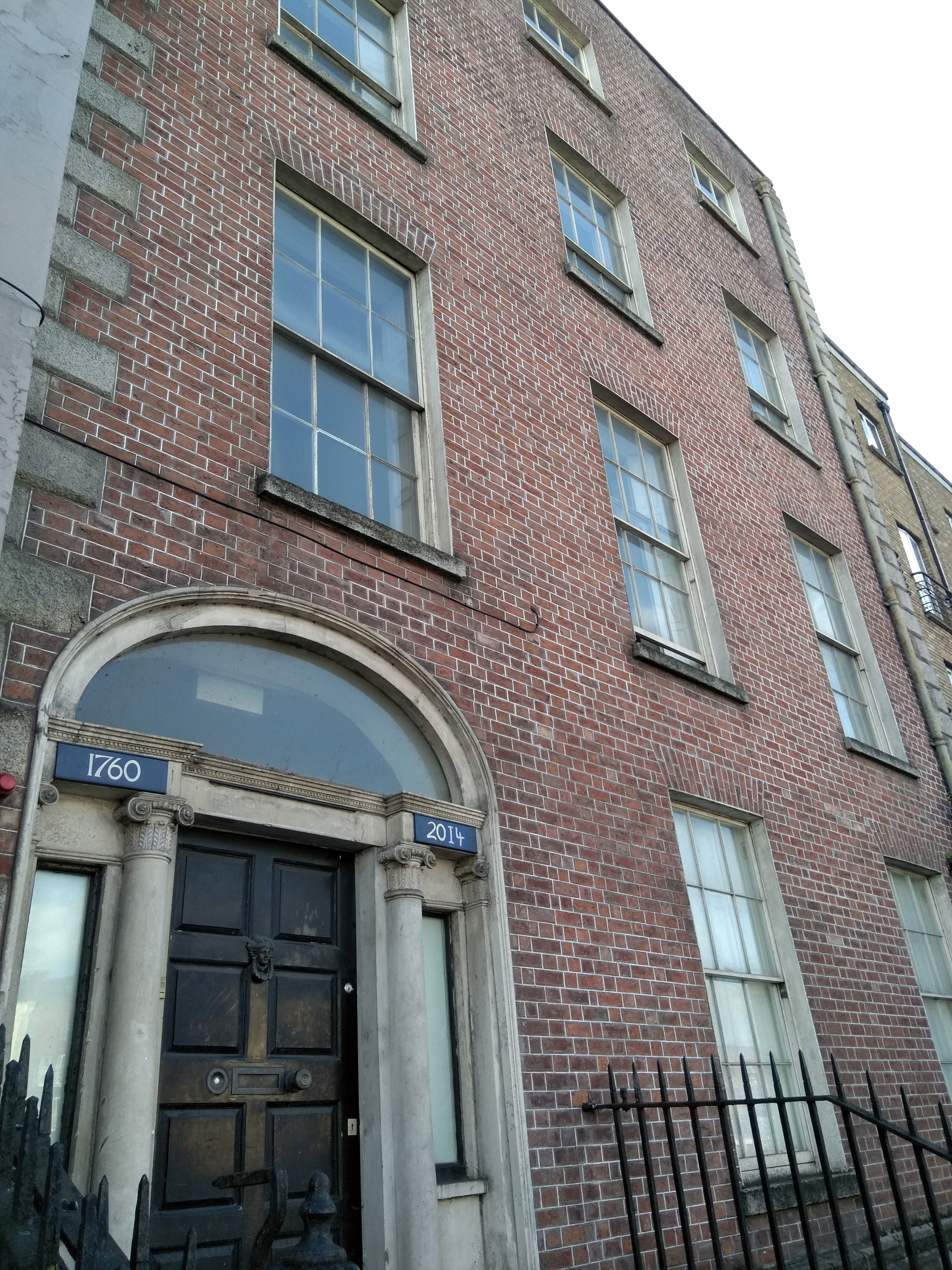
- 15 Usher's Island
- Born: 1748
- Died: 1822
- Occupation: Merchant
- Years active: 1770s–1820s
- Known for: Dublin Chamber of Commerce

Joshua Pim (1748–1822) was a Dublin merchant active in the cotton trade in Dublin in the late 18th and early 19th century, who made significant input into setting up the Dublin Chamber of Commerce.

== Biography ==
Joshua Pim was born in 1748, the son of John (Joshua) Pim (1718—1797).

Joshua and Joseph and traded as Joshua and Joseph Pim of Usher's Island which was subsequently taken over by George. Their address, 15 Usher's Island opposite James Joyce Bridge featured in "The Dead".

In 1783, Joshua Pim in conjunction with John Patrick drafted the theoretical basis for the Dublin Chamber of Commerce which carried on the work of the former Committee of Merchants. Joshua Pim acted both as treasurer and information officer.

Joshua did not marry, and his death in 1822 was preceded by his brother and partner Joseph in 1806. His amassed fortune and business interests passed to his nephew George Pim.

== Family ==
=== John Pim ===
John (Joshua) Pim (1718—1797) was the father of Joshua and who started up the business.

=== Sarah Grubb ===
Sarah Grubb was the eldest child of John Pim and a sister to Joshua. Following her husband's death in 1784 after only six years of marriage she ran the Mills at Clonmel with some assistance from Joshua.

=== Joseph Pim ===
Joseph Pim was a brother of Joshua and their business was typically styled as Joshua and Joseph Pim of Usher's Island (Note: Usher's Island is the name of a Dublin quay on the South bank of the River Liffey approximately 1.5 km (0.93 mi) upstream of O'Connell Bridge)

=== Richard Pim ===
Richard was a brother of Joshua and is described as a merchant and storekeeper. He became involved in a brewing business at City Quay around 1800. Richard Pim's business ventures ran into difficulties and various partnerships with branches of the Pim family and other Quaker families. Richard Pim eventually became bankrupt and fell into being disowned by the Quakers; the brewery eventually becoming controlled by James Pim and then his son Henry Pim (father and brother of James Pim junior), before eventually merging into Jameson). (Note: The resulting partnerships resulted in several Pim's describing themselves as brewers.) (Note: This brewery enterprise was not connected to the Pimm's brand but there may have been a distant family relationship between the individuals)

=== George Pim ===
Joshua Pim was not married and left his considerable estate and business interests to his nephew George Pim.

== Sources ==
- Harrison, Richard S. (1987). Dublin Quakers in Business 1800 — 1850 (M.Litt. thesis). Trinity College Dublin. hdl:2262/79673.
