= Pym baronets =

Extinct baronetcy in the Baronetage of England

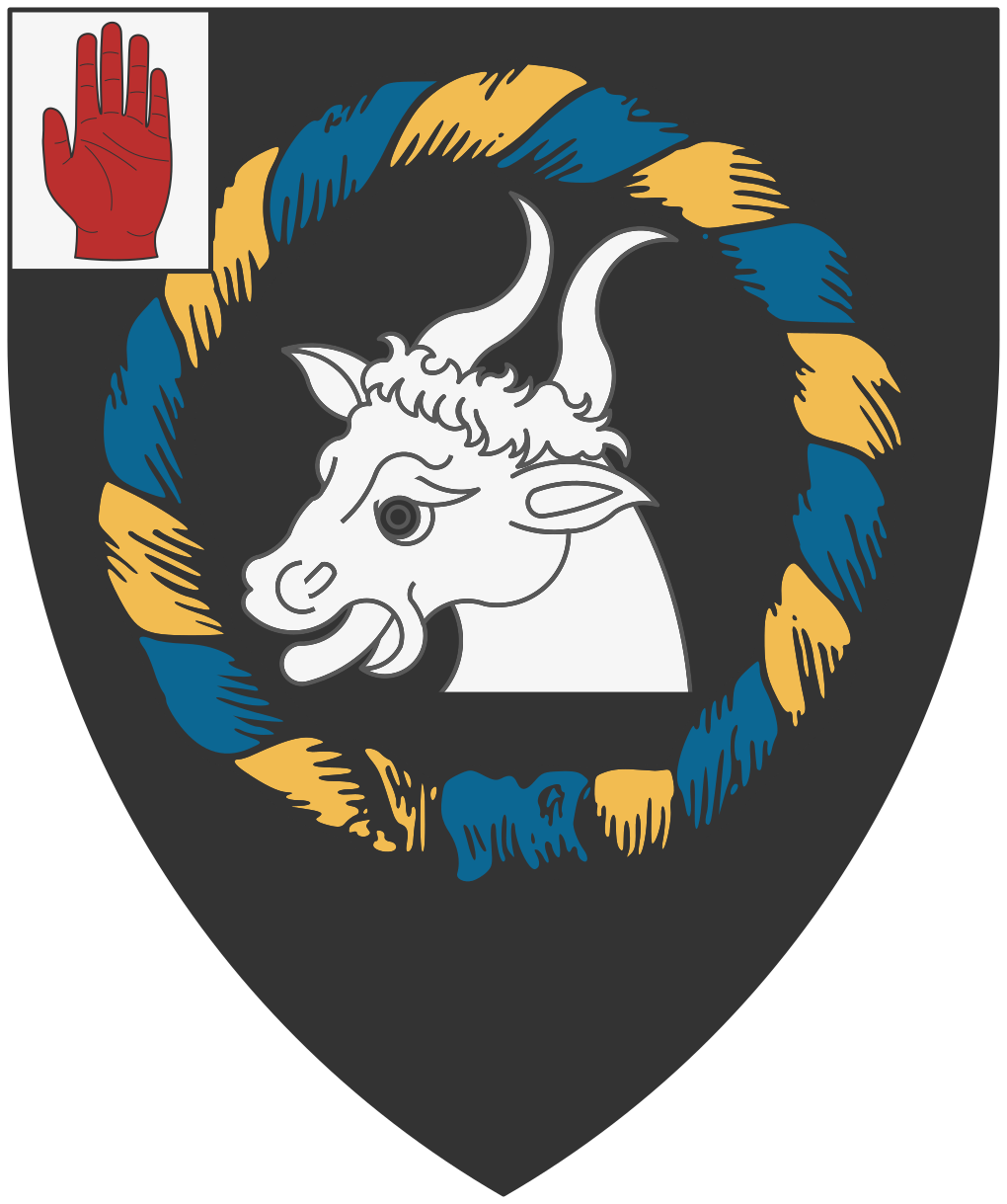
The coat of arms of the Pym baronets.

The Pym Baronetcy, of Brymore in the County of Somerset, was a title in the Baronetage of England. It was created on 14 July 1663 for Charles Pym, previously member of parliament for Bere Alston. The title became extinct on the death of the second baronet in 1688.

== Pym baronets, of Brymore (1663) ==
- Sir Charles Pym, 1st Baronet (c. 1620–1671)
- Sir Charles Pym, 2nd Baronet (1664–1688)
