= Ekpene Obom =

- Village
- Interactive map of Ekpene Obom
- Country: Nigeria
- State: Akwa Ibom
- Local Government Area: Etinan

Ekpene Obom is a village in Etinan local government area of Akwa Ibom State.
