= Richard Pim =

British civil servant and Royal Navy officer (1900–1987

Captain Sir Richard Pike Pim, KBE, VRD, DL (10 July 1900 – 26 June 1987) was a British civil servant and naval officer. He was the Inspector-General of the Royal Ulster Constabulary from August 1945 to January 1961. During World War II he served as supervisor of the Defence Map Room, 10 Downing Street and head of the Upper War Room, Admiralty.

Pim was born in 1900, the younger son of late Cecil Pim. He was in the Royal Naval Volunteer Reserve during World War I in Europe. In 1921 he joined the Royal Irish Constabulary before being appointed to Civil Service, Northern Ireland becoming the Assistant Secretary, Ministry of Home Affairs of Northern Ireland in 1935. In 1938 he was transferred to the staff of Prime Minister of Northern Ireland.

With the outbreak of World War II, he was mobilized a captain in the RNVR on 9 September 1939 into the Naval Staff, Operations Division at the Admiralty. There he was in charge of the War Room of the newly appointed First Lord of the Admiralty, Winston Churchill, and later headed the Map Room at 10 Downing Street, when Churchill became prime minister. Pim remained at Downing Street during the course of the war except for a brief stint on the Staff Allied Naval Commander, Algiers. Pim attended many overseas trips to set up temporary map rooms for the meetings with Roosevelt and later Stalin.

On Churchill's departure from Downing Street in 1945, Pim was made a Knight Bachelor in the prime minister's resignation honours. Returning to Northern Ireland, he was appointed Inspector General, Royal Ulster Constabulary a post he held until his retirement in 1961. In 1960 he was made a Knight Commander of Order of the British Empire. He served as BBC's National Governor for Northern Ireland from 1962 to 1967 and was a Member of Council, Winston Churchill Memorial Trusts, 1965–69; Member, Ulster Transport Authority, 1962–64. He was made Deputy Lieutenant of Belfast in 1957.

He married Marjorie Young in 1925, they had two sons. Lady Pim died in 1986 and Sir Richard the following year.
