= Px27-775 =

Px27
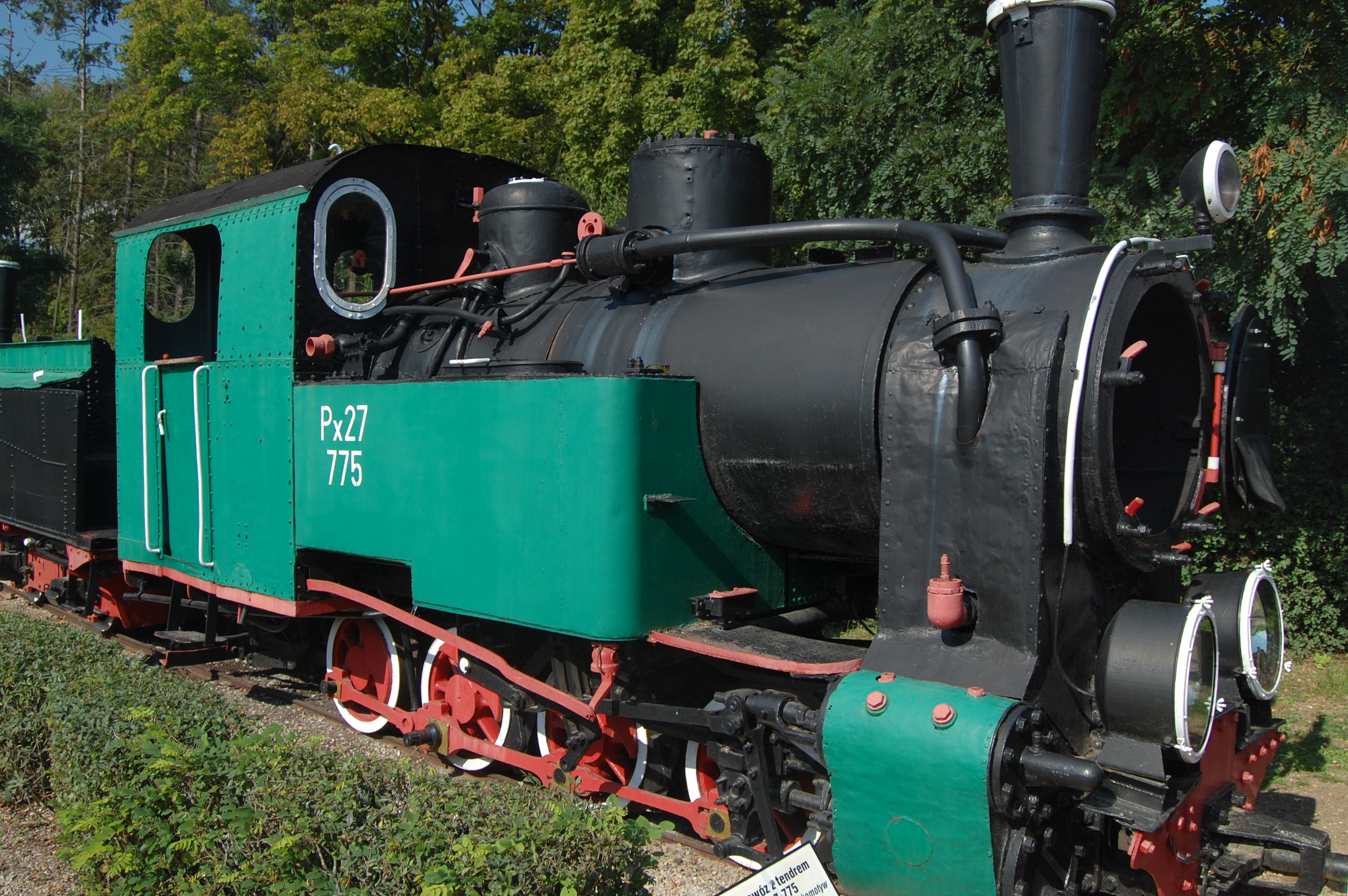
- Px27-775 in Museum in Wenecja
Type and origin
- Power type: steam
- Builder: Fablok
- Serial number: 343 & 344
- Model: W5A
- Build date: 1929
- Total produced: 2
Specifications
- Configuration
  - Whyte: 0-8-0T
  - UIC: D (Dn2t+t)
- Gauge: 600 mm (1 ft 11 5/8 in)
- Driver dia.: 650 mm (26 in)
- Tender wheels: 570 mm (22 in)
- Minimum curve: 30 m (98 ft)
- Wheelbase: 2,400 mm (7 ft 10 in)
  - Coupled: 800 mm (2 ft 7 in)
- Length: 6,120 mm (20 ft 1 in) (9,720 mm or 31 ft 11 in with tender)
- Width: 2,000 mm (6 ft 7 in)
- Height: 3,100 mm (10 ft 2 in)
- Axle load: 4.25 t
- Loco weight: 17 t
- Tender weight: 9 t
- Tender type: 2-axle
- Fuel type: coal
- Fuel capacity: 300 kg coal, 1.5 m3 water
- Tender cap.: 1700 kg coal, 3.3 m3 water
- Firebox
  - Grate area: 0.88 m^{2} (9.5 sq ft)
- Boiler pressure: 13 kg/cm^{2}
- Heating surface: 38 m^{2} (410 sq ft)
- Cylinders: 2
- Cylinder size: 285 mm (11.2 in) bore 350 mm (14 in) stroke
- Valve gear: Heusinger
- Loco brake: Steam and hand
Performance figures
- Maximum speed: 30 km/h (19 mph)
- Power output: 110 hp
- Tractive effort: 4265 kg
Career
- Operators: Wyrzyskie Koleje Powiatowe; Polish State Railways (PKP)
- Number in class: 2
- Retired: 1976
- Current owner: Narrow Gauge Railway Museum in Wenecja (Px27-775)
- Disposition: exhibit

Px27 is a class of Polish State Railways (PKP) 600 mm (1 ft 11 5/8 in) narrow-gauge steam locomotive built by Fablok in Chrzanów, Poland, in 1929 (factory type W5A). Only two locomotives of this class were made, and one, Px27-775, is currently preserved.

== History ==
In 1927 Wyrzysk County Railways (Wyrzyskie Koleje Powiatowe) ordered two locomotives in the First Locomotive Factory in Poland (Fablok), fit for service on sloping line profile. Fablok designed and manufactured two W5A type locomotives in 1929. After 1961 these were designated as PKP class Px27. It was a D (0-8-0T) locomotive with a two-axle tender. The design based upon Fablok's earlier W2A type tank locomotive (later Tx26-427). Only after nine years, in 1938 the third and last slightly differing locomotive of W5A type was ordered by other railway (it was later designed as Px38 class).

Both locomotives, factory numbers 343 and 344, received stock numbers 25 and 26 respectively and stationed in Białośliwie depot. Both survived World War II, working on their railway. After the war, all county railways were taken over by the Polish State Railways (PKP) and in 1947 the locomotives were included into PKP Px2 collective class and given numbers Px2-801 (ex 26) and 802 (ex 25). According to new regulations, in 1961 both locomotives were classified as Px27 class, being the only ones in this class (P - locomotive with a tender, x - D axle arrangement, 27 – Polish origin locomotive designed in 1927). Px2-801 (factory no. 344) was renamed Px27-774, and Px2-802 (factory no. 343) was renamed Px27-775.

After World War II both locomotives worked still on Bydgoszcz-Wyrzysk railway, basing in Białośliwie. Px27-774 was retired on 26 September 1970, and then scrapped. Px 27-775 worked until 1976, then it was given to Narrow Gauge Railway Museum in Wenecja, as a cold exhibit. (It might be noted, that also Px38-805 of W5A type is preserved in Wenecja).

Build no.	year	no.: until 1948	1949-1960	from 1961	disposition
Fablok 343	1929	25	Px2-802	Px27-775	retired in 1976, preserved
Fablok 344	1929	26	Px2-801	Px27-774	retired in 1970, scrapped

== See also ==
- Narrow-gauge railways in Poland
