= LNWR Class B =

Class of British steam locomotives

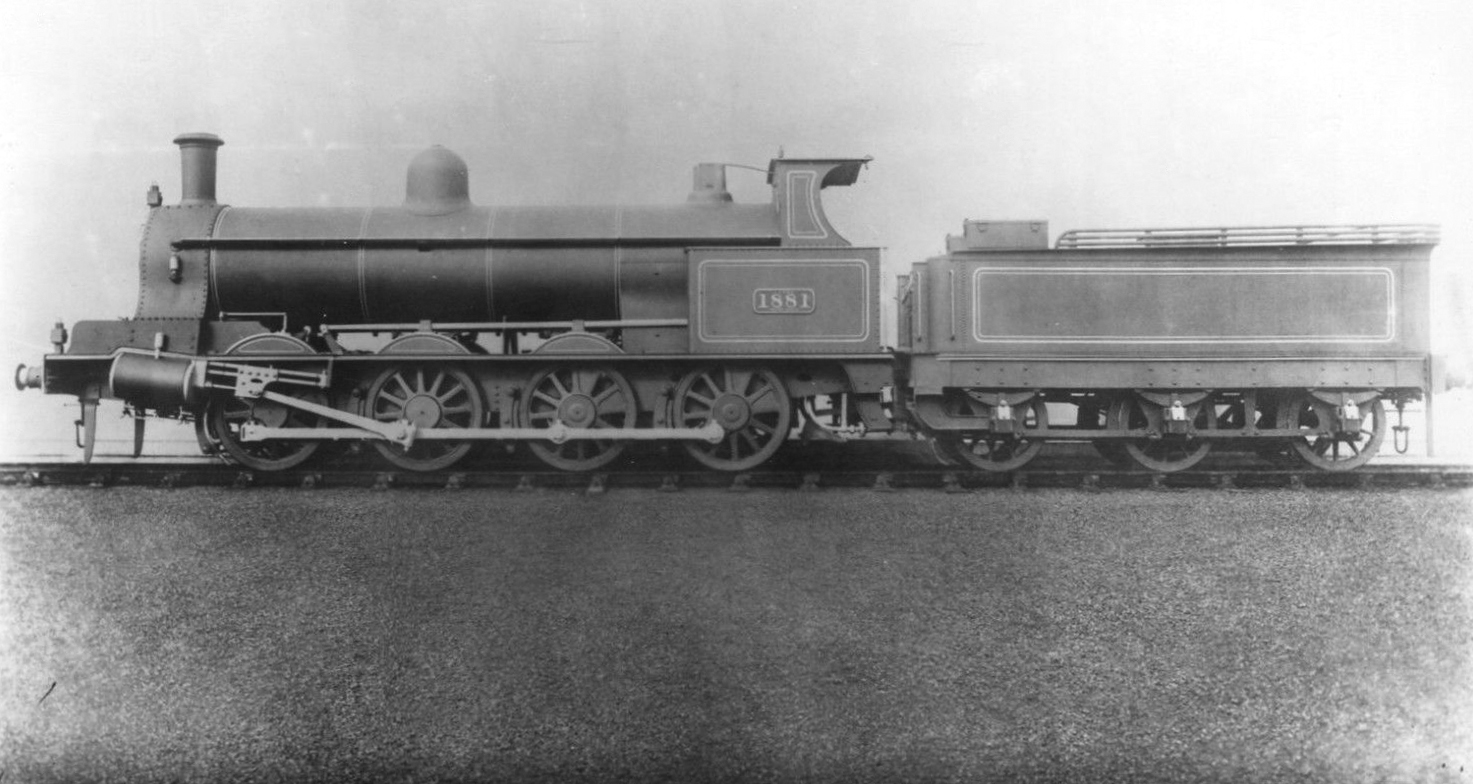
- No. 1881 (later LMS 8900) in photographic grey livery - classified B from 1911
Type and origin
- Power type: Steam
- Designer: Francis Webb
- Builder: Crewe Works
- Build date: 1901-1904
- Total produced: 170
Specifications
- Configuration
  - Whyte: 0-8-0
  - UIC: D n4v
- Gauge: 4 ft 8 1/2 in (1,435 mm)
- Driver dia.: 4 ft 5 1/2 in (1.359 m)
- Loco weight: 53 long tons 10 cwt (119,800 lb or 54.4 t)
- Fuel type: coal
- Boiler pressure: 200 psi (1.38 MPa)
- Cylinders: 4, compound
- High-pressure cylinder: (2 outside) 15" x 24"
- Low-pressure cylinder: (2 inside) 20 1/2" x 24"
Career
- Operators: LNWR » LMS
- Disposition: 26 rebuilt to Class E 1904–08; 10 rebuilt to Class F 1906–08; 32 rebuilt to Class G 1906–17; 91 rebuilt to Class G1 1917–27; 11 scrapped 1921–28

The London and North Western Railway (LNWR) Class B was a class of 0-8-0 steam locomotives introduced in 1901. A development of the three-cylinder compound Class A (though this letter classification was not introduced until 1911), they had a 4-cylinder compound arrangement. 170 were built between 1901 and 1904.

== Rebuilds ==
Class E

Between 1904 and 1908, Webb's successor George Whale added a leading pony truck to 26 engines, making them 2-8-0s and taking them into Class E (again from 1911).

Class F

Between 1906 and 1908, Whale also rebuilt 10 with larger Experiment-type boiler to Class F, again adding a leading pony truck. (Two more of Class B were also converted to Class F via Class E).

Class G

Neither of the above conversions was particularly successful and, as a result, 32 were rebuilt to Class G with 2-cylinder simple expansion between 1910 and 1917.

Class G1

Whale's Successor Charles Bowen Cooke rebuilt a further 91 direct from Class B to 2-cylinder simple superheated LNWR Class G1 (also known as "Super Ds"). The rebuilds from Class B to Class G1 continued under LMS ownership between 1923 and 1927.

Summary

A total of 170 locomotives were built but No. 134 was destroyed in a boiler explosion at Buxton on 11 November 1921 leaving 169. The rebuilds (some under LMS ownership) totalled 159, leaving 10 unrebuilt.

== LMS ownership ==
The London, Midland and Scottish Railway (LMS) inherited 53 unrebuilt Class B locomotives in 1923 and numbered them 8900–8952. The LMS continued to rebuild them to Class G1 and the number of unrebuilt locomotives dwindled to 10.

== Withdrawal ==
The remaining 10 Class B locomotives were withdrawn in 1927–1928. None were preserved.
