= C1 class =

C1 class or Class C1 may refer to:

- C1-class Melbourne tram
- Finnish Steam Locomotive Class C1, 0-6-0 steam locomotives
- GNR Class C1 (large boiler), 4-4-2 steam locomotives
- GNR Class C1 (small boiler), 4-4-2 steam locomotives
- LB&SCR C1 class, 0-6-0 steam locomotives
- NER Class C1, 0-6-0 steam locomotives
- LNWR Class C1, 0-8-0 steam locomotives
- Pennsylvania Railroad class C1, 0-8-0 steam locomotives
