= Px38-805 =

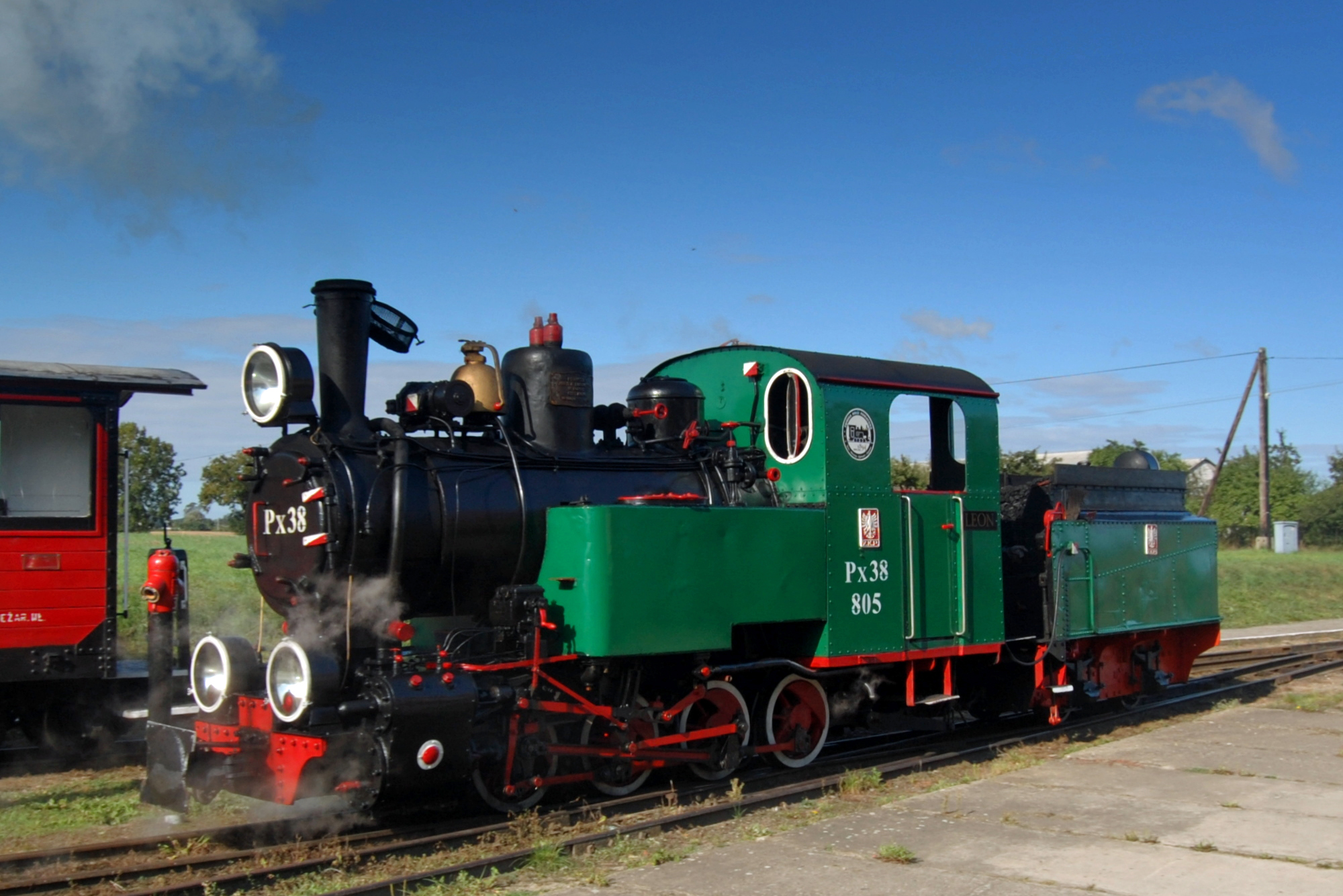
Type and origin
- Power type: steam
- Builder: Fablok
- Serial number: 727
- Model: W5A
- Build date: 1938
- Total produced: 1
Specifications
- Configuration
  - Whyte: 0-8-0T
  - UIC: D (Dn2t+t)
- Gauge: 600 mm (1 ft 11 5/8 in)
- Driver dia.: 650 mm (26 in)
- Tender wheels: 570 mm (22 in)
- Minimum curve: 30 m (98 ft)
- Wheelbase: 2,400 mm (7 ft 10 in)
  - Coupled: 800 mm (2 ft 7 in)
  - Tender: 1,300 mm (4 ft 3 in)
- Length: 6,220 mm (20 ft 5 in); 9,920 mm (32 ft 7 in) with tender
- Width: 1,800 mm (5 ft 11 in)
- Height: 3,100 mm (10 ft 2 in)
- Axle load: 4.4 t
- Loco weight: 17.5 t
- Tender weight: 7.8 t
- Tender type: 2-axle
- Fuel type: coal
- Fuel capacity: 300 kg coal, 1.5 m³ water
- Tender cap.: 1500 kg coal, 3.5 m³ water
- Firebox
  - Grate area: 0.88 m^{2} (9.5 sq ft)
- Boiler pressure: 13 kg/cm²
- Heating surface: 38 m^{2} (410 sq ft)
- Cylinders: 2
- Cylinder size: 285 mm (11.2 in) bore × 350 mm (14 in) stroke
- Valve gear: Heusinger
- Loco brake: Steam and hand
Performance figures
- Maximum speed: 30 km/h (19 mph)
- Power output: 110 hp (82 kW)
- Tractive effort: 4,265 kgf (9,400 lbf)
Career
- Operators: Wrzesińska Kolej Powiatowa; Polish State Railways (PKP)
- Class: Px38
- Number in class: 805
- Official name: Leon
- Current owner: Narrow Gauge Railway Museum in Wenecja
- Disposition: active

Px38-805, named Leon, is a preserved Polish 600 mm (1 ft 11 5/8 in) narrow gauge steam locomotive built by Fablok in Chrzanów, Poland. It was the only locomotive of PKP class Px38, and one of three built locomotives of Fablok W5A type.

== History ==
In 1929 the First Locomotive Factory in Poland (Fablok) designed a W5A type locomotive, basing upon its earlier W2A type (PKP Tx26-427), and manufactured two units (later designated PKP class Px27). In 1938 another one slightly differing locomotive was ordered by Września County Railway (Wrzesińska Kolej Powiatowa), later to become Px38 class. It was a D (0-8-0T) locomotive with a two-axle tender. It was powered by a simple twin engine, working on a saturated steam, developing 110 hp power output.

The locomotive, factory no. 727, was given a stock number 5 (W.K.P. N°5). It survived World War II, working on its railway. After the war, all county railways were taken over by the Polish State Railways (PKP) and in 1947 the locomotive was included into a collective PKP Px4 class and given a designation Px4-805. According to new regulations, in 1961 the locomotive was renumbered to Px38-805, being the only machine of Px38 class (P - locomotive with a tender, x - D axle arrangement, 38 – Polish origin locomotive built in 1938).

In following years the locomotive was used on most of PKP 600 mm railways. From 1958 it stationed for a longer term in Myszyniec, and from 1973 in Białośliwie. From 1983 it has been stationed in Żnin, currently on a museum railway of Narrow Gauge Railway Museum in Wenecja. From 2002 the locomotive has a name Leon, in a memory of a Narrow Gauge Railway Museum guide Leon Lichociński.

It has been active, as of 2015. In 2015 it left Poland for the first time, taking part in narrow gauge railway meetings in Germany and Pithiviers in France.

== See also ==
- Narrow gauge railways in Poland
