= LNWR Class D =

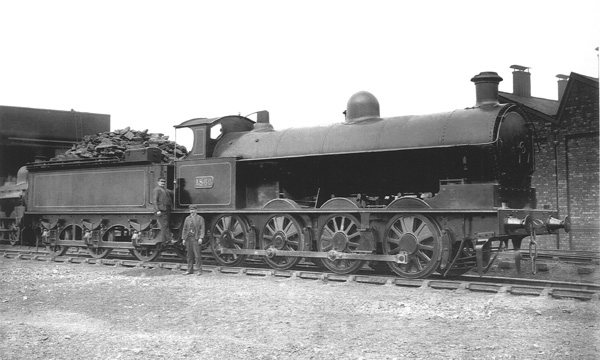
- No.1866
Type and origin
- Power type: Steam
- Designer: George Whale
- Rebuilder: Crewe Works
- Rebuild date: 1906–1909
- Number rebuilt: 62 from Class A; 1 from no. 2524
Specifications
- Configuration
  - Whyte: 0-8-0
  - UIC: D n2
- Gauge: 4 ft 8 1/2 in (1,435 mm)
- Driver dia.: 4 ft 5.5 in (1.359 m)
- Fuel type: Coal
- Boiler pressure: 175 psi (1.21 MPa)
- Heating surface: 2,043.25 sq ft (189.824 m^{2})
- Cylinders: 2 inside
- Cylinder size: 19.5 by 24 inches (500 mm × 610 mm)
Career
- Operators: London and North Western Railway; London, Midland and Scottish Railway
- Disposition: All rebuilt to Class G1 1923–1937

The London and North Western Railway (LNWR) Class D was a class of 0-8-0 steam locomotives. They were simple-expansion rebuilds of earlier Webb Class A three-cylinder compound engines.

== History ==
Though the original rebuilds of the Class As had reused the existing small (4 ft 3 in diameter) boilers with 19.5 in diameter cylinders (Class C, the smaller boilers could not raise adequate steam, so from 1906 the next 62 rebuilds (63 according to the LNWR Society) were rebuilt with a larger 5 ft 2 in diameter Experiment-type boilers, retaining the cylinders. These, from 1911, would be classified D. These rebuilds left smaller boilers available and so from 1906 rebuilds used these smaller boilers with smaller cylinders to Class C1.

To these compound rebuilds was added the prototype eight-coupled goods engine No. 2524 which was rebuilt with a larger boiler in 1906. Previously it had been similar to the Class C with a smaller boiler; though was not classified as such since the letter classification was introduced in 1911.

== Numbering ==
All Ds were numbered in the 18xx or 25xx series by the LNWR. All passed into LMS ownership in 1923, and the LMS assigned them the numbers 9002-64, sequentially in order of rebuild date.

The LMS rebuilt all of the Ds with the addition of superheating, taking them into Class G1, nicknamed "Super Ds" between 1925 and 1934. Many carried their LNWR numbers until rebuilt for a second time, and the LMS number thereafter. And thus the class was rendered extinct.
