= LNWR Class C =

Class of 0-8-0 steam locomotive

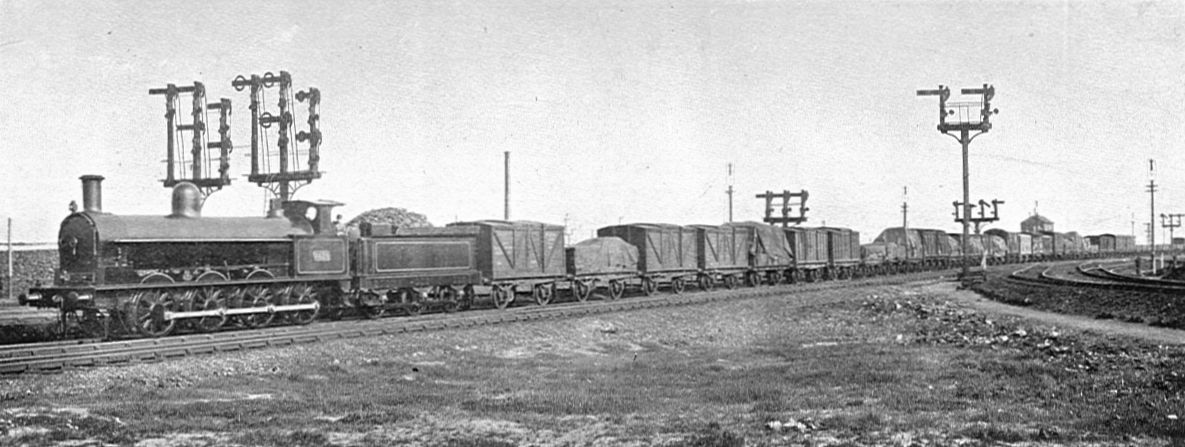
- No. 2529 leaving Crewe with a goods train.
Type and origin
- Power type: Steam
- Designer: George Whale
- Rebuilder: Crewe Works
- Rebuild date: 1904–06
- Number rebuilt: 15 from Class A
Specifications
- Configuration
  - Whyte: 0-8-0
  - UIC: D n2
- Gauge: 4 ft 8 1/2 in (1,435 mm)
- Driver dia.: 4 ft 5.5 in (1.359 m)
- Fuel type: Coal
- Boiler pressure: 175 psi (1.21 MPa)
- Heating surface: 1,489 sq ft (138.3 m^{2})
- Cylinders: 2 inside
- Cylinder size: 19.5 by 24 inches (500 mm × 610 mm)
Career
- Operators: London and North Western Railway, London, Midland and Scottish Railway
- Disposition: 5 rebuilt to Class G1 1925–27; 10 scrapped 1927–32

The London and North Western Railway (LNWR) Class C was a class of 0-8-0 steam locomotives. They were two-cylinder simple expansion rebuilds of the three-cylinder compound Class A designed by F.W. Webb. Fifteen Class As were converted to Class C between 1904 and 1906 by George Whale.

== Class C1 ==
The Class A boilers proved inadequate for the 19½ inch bore cylinders of the Class C so the next 34 Class A conversions were to Class C1 with 18½ inch bore cylinders.

== Numbering ==
All passed into LMS ownership in 1923, and the LMS allocated them the numbers 8953–67, though not all were applied before withdrawal.

== Rebuilding ==
The LMS rebuilt five of the Class Cs (LMS Nos 8953/4/62/4/6) to Class G1 between 1925 and 1927.

== Withdrawal ==
The remaining 10 engines were withdrawn between 1927 and 1932. None were preserved.
