= LNWR Class E =

Class of British steam locomotives

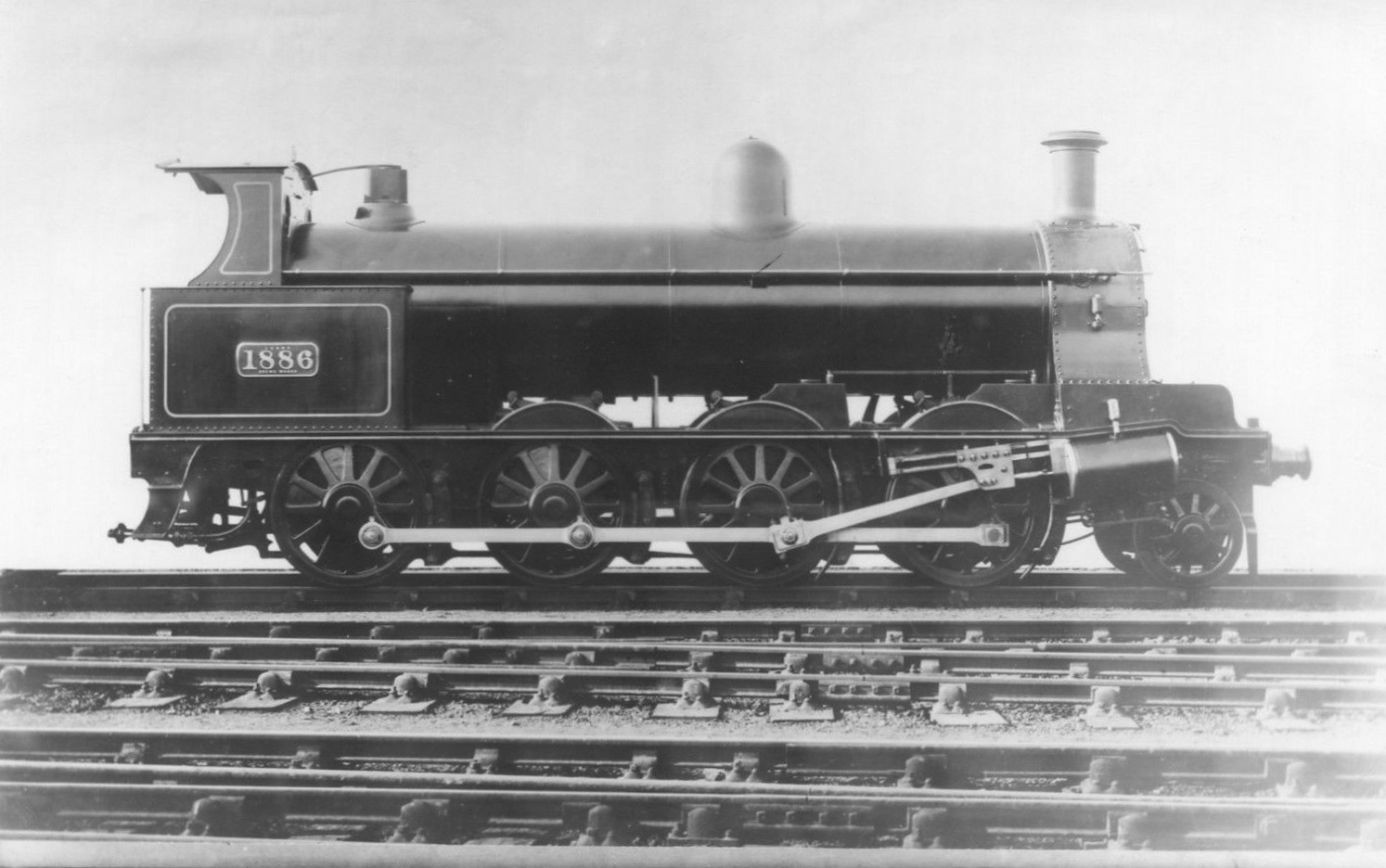
- No. 1886 without tender
Type and origin
- Power type: Steam
- Designer: George Whale
- Rebuilder: Crewe Works
- Rebuild date: 1904–08
- Number rebuilt: 26 from Class B
Specifications
- Configuration
  - Whyte: 2-8-0
  - UIC: 1′D n4vg
- Gauge: 4 ft 8 1/2 in (1,435 mm)
- Driver dia.: 4 ft 8 in (1,420 mm)
- Fuel type: Coal
- Boiler: 4 ft 5 in (1,346 mm) x 15 ft 6 in (4,724 mm)
- Boiler pressure: 200 psi (1.4 MPa)
- Heating surface: 1,753 sq ft (162.9 m^{2})
- Cylinders: Four, two outside high-pressure, two inside low-pressure
- High-pressure cylinder: 15 in × 24 in (381 mm × 610 mm)
- Low-pressure cylinder: 20 1/2 in × 24 in (521 mm × 610 mm)
- Valve gear: Joy
Career
- Operators: London and North Western Railway, London, Midland and Scottish Railway
- Class: E
- Power class: LMS: 3F
- Number in class: 26
- Withdrawn: 1907–28
- Disposition: 2 rebuilt to class F 1907–08; 18 rebuilt to class G1 1917–24; 6 scrapped 1927–28

The London and North Western Railway (LNWR) Class E was a class of 2-8-0 steam locomotives in service between 1904 and 1928.

== History ==
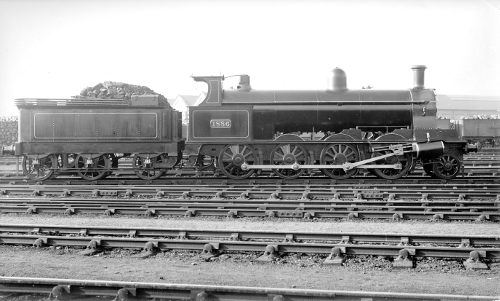
No. 1886 with tender

26 were rebuilt by George Whale from Class B 4-cylinder compounds with the simple addition of a leading pony truck to reduce excessive front overhang between 1904 and 1908. The only alteration was to wheelbase and weight, but when the letter classification system was introduced in 1911, this took them into a different class. Two Class Es (No. 1038 in 1907 and No. 647 in 1908) were further rebuilt to Class Fs by replacing the 4 ft 3 in (130 cm) diameter boiler with a larger 5 ft 2 in (157 cm) diameter boiler.

From 1917, Charles Bowen Cooke started to rebuild the remaining 24 Class Es into LNWR Class G1 0-8-0s with simple expansion engines. 12 had been modified by the grouping of 1923, and a further pair were rebuilt in January and February of that year. Of the remaining ten Class Es, the LMS allocated them the numbers 9600-9. A further four were rebuilt to Class G1 in 1923-4, while the remaining six engines were withdrawn as Class Es in 1927/8, two of them never receiving their allocated LMS number. None were preserved.

== List of locomotives ==
LNWR no.	Rebuilt from B	LMS no.	Fate	Notes
1883	1904		Rebuilt to G1 1918	
1884	1904		Rebuilt to G1 1917	
1885	1905		Rebuilt to G1 1917	
1886	1904		Rebuilt to G1 1923	
1888	1904	(9600)	Rebuilt to G1 1924	
1889	1906		Rebuilt to G1 1920	
905	1905	9601	Withdrawn 1928	
18	1905	(9602)	Withdrawn 1928	
2558	1906	9603	Withdrawn 1928	
2563	1908	(9604)	Rebuilt to G1 1924	
1017	1906	(9605)	Withdrawn 1927	
1038	1905		Rebuilt to F 1907	
1042	1906	9606	Withdrawn 1928	
1064	1906	(9607)	Rebuilt to G1 1923	
1065	1906		Rebuilt to G1 1919	
1222	1906	9608	Withdrawn 1928	
1223	1906		Rebuilt to G1 1921	
1227	1908		Rebuilt to G1 1921	
1236	1906		Rebuilt to G1 1921	
2574	1906		Rebuilt to G1 1920	
1586	1906		Rebuilt to G1 1921	
647	1907		Rebuilt to F 1908	
1585	1906	(9609)	Rebuilt to G1 1923	
2056	1907		Rebuilt to G1 1921	
437	1906		Rebuilt to G1 1922	
2169	1906		Rebuilt to G1 1923	

LMS numbers in parentheses were not carried prior to rebuilding as G1 or withdrawal.
