= LNWR Class C1 =

Class of steam locomotives

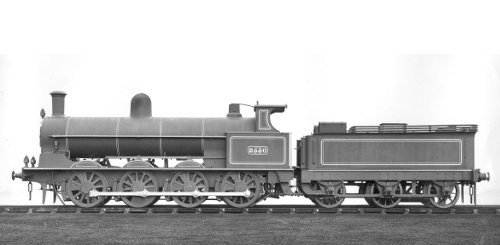
- No. 2550 in photographic grey livery
Type and origin
- Power type: Steam
- Designer: Charles Bowen Cooke
- Rebuilder: Crewe Works
- Rebuild date: 1909–12
- Number rebuilt: 34 from Class A
Specifications
- Configuration
  - Whyte: 0-8-0
- Gauge: 4 ft 8 1/2 in (1,435 mm)
- Driver dia.: 4 ft 5.5 in (1.359 m)
- Fuel type: Coal
- Boiler pressure: 175 psi (1.21 MPa)
- Heating surface: 1,489 sq ft (138.3 m^{2})
- Cylinders: 2 inside
- Cylinder size: 18 1/2 in × 24 in (470 mm × 610 mm)
Career
- Operators: London and North Western Railway, London, Midland and Scottish Railway
- Class: C1
- Power class: LMS: 4F to 1928, then 3F
- Number in class: 34
- Withdrawn: 1927–33
- Disposition: All scrapped

The London and North Western Railway (LNWR) Class C1 was a class of 0-8-0 steam locomotives. 34 were rebuilt by Charles Bowen Cooke from Class A 3-cylinder compounds between 1909 and 1912.

== History ==
Rebuilds of the troublesome Webb Class A compounds to Class D simple expansion engines used larger (5'2" diameter) boilers, with the result that there were many spare smaller (4'3" diameter) boilers available. As a result, rebuilds of the Class As from 1906 retained their smaller boilers. As a consequence, the cylinders had to be reduced to 18.5" diameter, compared with 19.5" with the Class C, and this took them into a new class (or subclass) - C1.

== Numbering ==
When rebuilt from Class A, all the C1s retained their existing LNWR numbers, which were in the 18xx or 25xx series. All passed into LMS ownership on the grouping of 1923. The LMS assigned them the numbers 8968-9001, sequentially in order of rebuild date, though not all were applied before withdrawal.

LNWR no.	Rebuilt from A	LMS no.	Withdrawn	Ref.
2531	1909	8978	1932	
2533	1910	8979	1929	
2534	1912	(9000)	1927	
2535	1910	8986	1930	
2542	1910	8990	1930	
2543	1910	8981	1930	
2545	1910	8980	1930	
2546	1909	8969	1932	
2550	1909	8976	1932	
2554	1911	8997	1930	
2555	1911	8998	1932	
1801	1909	8977	1930	
1806	1910	(8984)	1928	
1809	1909	(8971)	1927	
1811	1911	8991	1932	
1817	1912	8999	1930	
1826	1911	8995	1930	
1829	1910	8988	1930	
1835	1912	9001	1928	
1840	1909	8975	1930	
1841	1910	8983	1930	
1844	1910	8985	1930	
1847	1910	8982	1930	
1849	1910	(8987)	1928	
1850	1909	(8970)	1927	
1851	1911	8992	1932	
1852	1911	8993	1932	
1858	1911	(8996)	1927	
1859	1911	8994	1930	
1861	1909	8972	1930	
1862	1909	(8968)	1927	
1867	1909	8973	1933	
1869	1910	8989	1928	
1875	1909	8974	1930	

LMS numbers in parentheses were not carried prior to withdrawal.

== Withdrawal ==
Withdrawal occurred between 1927 and 1932. None were preserved.
