= LNWR Class A =

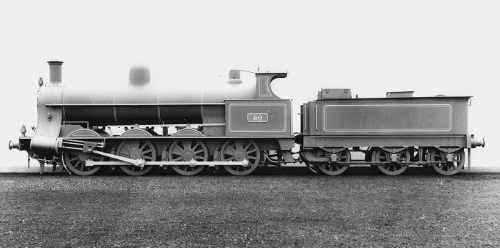
- No. 50 in photographic grey livery
Type and origin
- Power type: Steam
- Designer: F.W. Webb
- Builder: LNWR at Crewe Works
- Build date: 1893–1900
- Total produced: 111
Specifications
- Configuration
  - Whyte: 0-8-0
  - UIC: D n3vG
- Gauge: 4 ft 8 1/2 in (1,435 mm)
- Driver dia.: 4 ft 5.5 in (1.359 m)
- Wheelbase: 17 ft 3 in (5.26 m)
- Loco weight: 50 long tons 0 cwt (112,000 lb or 50.8 t)
- Fuel type: Coal
- Boiler pressure: 175 psi (1.21 MPa)
- Heating surface: 1,489 sq ft (138.3 m^{2})
- Cylinders: Three, compound
- High-pressure cylinder: (2 outside) 15 by 24 inches (380 mm × 610 mm)
- Low-pressure cylinder: (1 inside) 30 by 24 inches (760 mm × 610 mm)
- Valve gear: Stephenson link motion
Career
- Operators: London and North Western Railway
- Disposition: 15 rebuilt to Class C 1904–06; 62 rebuilt to Class D 1906–09; 34 rebuilt to Class C1 1909–12

The London and North Western Railway (LNWR) Class A was a class of 0-8-0 steam locomotives. From 1893 to 1900, Crewe Works built 111 of these engines, which had a three-cylinder compound arrangement, and were designed by Francis Webb. According to the LNWR Society, 110 were built between 1894 and 1900.

== Construction and numbering ==
A prototype, no. 50, was built in 1893, and used in trials against the two-cylinder simple-expansion 0-8-0 no. 2524, which had been built the previous year. After the trials, no. 50 was renumbered 2525 and a further 110 of the compound design were then built in several batches between 1894 and 1900, as follows.

LNWR Class A orders
| Quantity | Crewe numbers | Running numbers | Entered service |
|---|---|---|---|
| 1 | 3471 | 50, later 2525 | September 1893 |
| 10 | 3546–55 | 2526–35 | November 1894 – February 1895 |
| 20 | 3661–80 | 2536–55 | August–December 1896 |
| 20 | 3806–25 | 1801–20 | October 1897 – January 1898 |
| 10 | 3826–35 | 1821–30 | April–May 1898 |
| 10 | 3836–45 | 1831–40 | July–August 1898 |
| 10 | 3846–55 | 1841–50 | October–November 1898 |
| 10 | 3888–97 | 1851–60 | February 1899 |
| 10 | 3898–3907 | 1861–70 | May 1899 |
| 10 | 4025–34 | 1871–80 | April–May 1900 |

== Rebuilding ==
Like the other Webb compounds, they proved problematic, so in 1904 George Whale began rebuilding these to simple expansion engines. Fifteen were converted to Class C between 1904 and 1906, 62 to Class D between 1906 and 1909, with the remaining 34 rebuilt by Charles Bowen Cooke to Class C1 between 1909 and 1912.

All Class D locomotives were later rebuilt to Class G1. Some of them, rebuilt to Class G2A, were still running in 1962.

== Classification ==
The LNWR letter classification system for 8 coupled engines (A, B, C, etc.) was introduced in 1911.
