= LNWR Class F =

Class of British steam locomotives

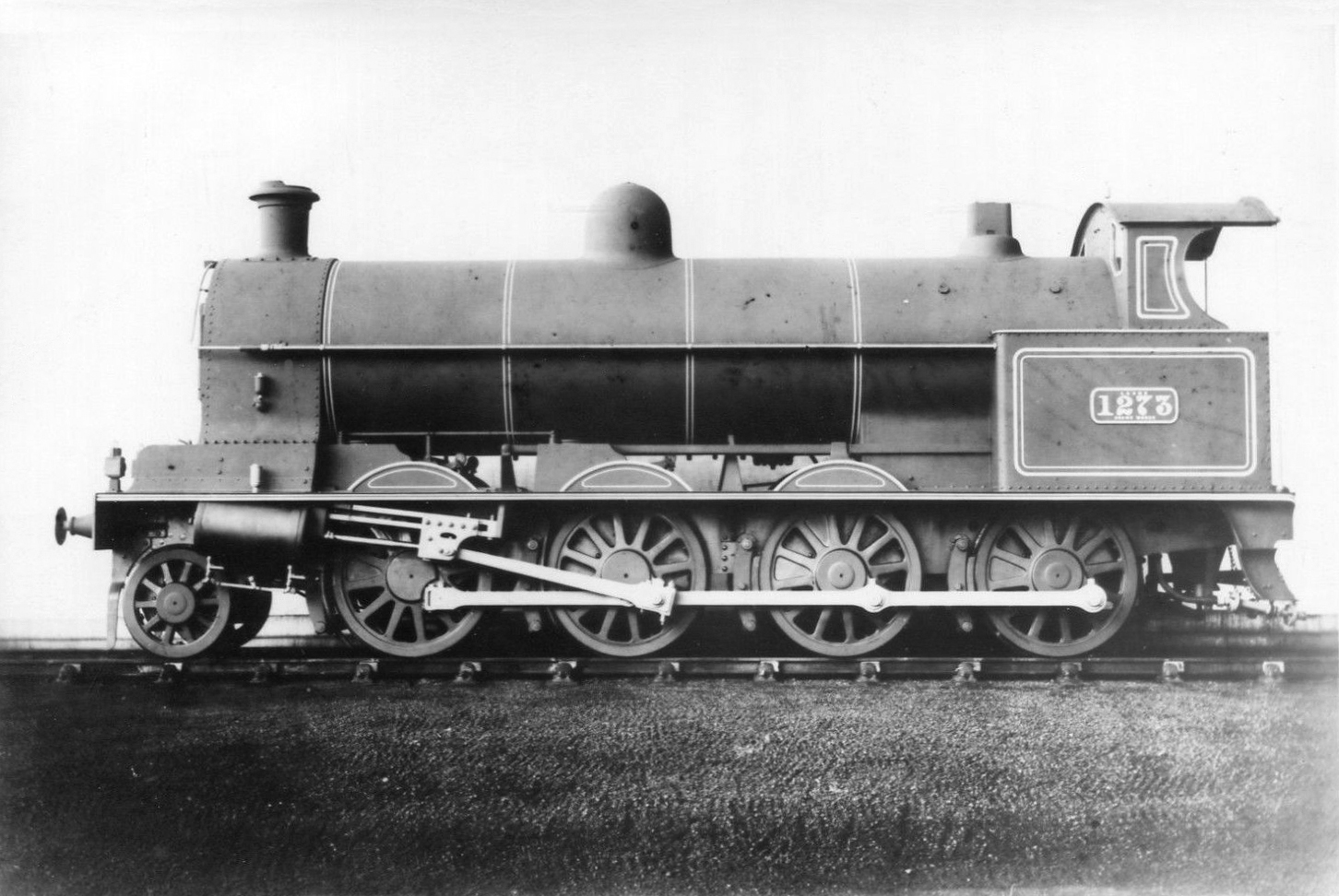
- No. 1273 in photographic grey livery without tender
Type and origin
- Power type: Steam
- Designer: George Whale
- Rebuilder: Crewe Works
- Rebuild date: 1906–08
- Number rebuilt: 10 from Class B 2 from Class E
Specifications
- Configuration
  - Whyte: 2-8-0
  - UIC: 1′D n4vg
- Gauge: 4 ft 8 1/2 in (1,435 mm)
- Driver dia.: 4 ft 8 in (1,420 mm)
- Fuel type: Coal
- Boiler: 5 ft 2 in (1,575 mm) x 14 ft 6 in (4,420 mm)
- Boiler pressure: 175 psi (1.21 MPa)
- Heating surface: 2,180 sq ft (203 m^{2})
- Cylinders: Four, two outside high-pressure, two inside low-pressure
- High-pressure cylinder: 15 in × 24 in (381 mm × 610 mm)
- Low-pressure cylinder: 20 1/2 in × 24 in (521 mm × 610 mm)
- Valve gear: Joy
Career
- Operators: London and North Western Railway, London, Midland and Scottish Railway
- Class: F
- Power class: LMS: 3F
- Number in class: 12
- Withdrawn: 1921–28
- Disposition: 10 rebuilt to class G1 1921–25; 2 scrapped 1927–28

The London and North Western Railway (LNWR) Class F was a class of 2-8-0 steam locomotives in service between 1906 and 1928.

== History ==
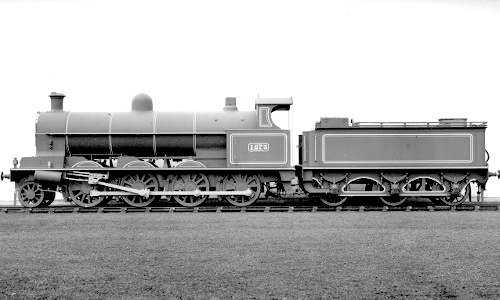
No. 1273 in photographic grey livery based on LNWR lined black livery

George Whale had rebuilt 26 of the Class B compound 0-8-0s with the addition of a leading pony truck between 1904–1908 to what would become Class E in 1911. However, from 1906 10 Class Bs were rebuilt with larger 5 ft 2 in (157 cm) diameter boilers, along with a pair of Class Es (Nos. 1038 and 647) in 1907 and 1908 respectively.

From 1921, the LNWR started rebuilding the Class Fs into Class G1 superheated 0-8-0s, and by the grouping of 1923 six had been rebuilt. The remaining six were allocated the LMS numbers 9610–5. The LMS rebuilt a further four into G1s between 1923 and 1925. The last two were withdrawn and scrapped in 1927 and 1928 without being rebuilt.

== List of locomotives ==
LNWR no.	Origin	LMS no.	Fate	Notes
899	Rebuilt from B 1907	(9610)	Rebuilt to G1 1923	
352	Rebuilt from B 1907	(9611)	Withdrawn 1927	
2114	Rebuilt from B 1908		Rebuilt to G1 1922	
906	Rebuilt from B 1907	(9612)	Rebuilt to G1 1923	
1036	Rebuilt from B 1907		Rebuilt to G1 1921	
1038	Rebuilt from E 1907		Rebuilt to G1 1921	
2570	Rebuilt from B 1906		Rebuilt to G1 1921	
1247	Rebuilt from B 1906	(9613)	Rebuilt to G1 1923	
1273	Rebuilt from B 1906	9614	Withdrawn 1928	
2573	Rebuilt from B 1908		Rebuilt to G1 1922	
647	Rebuilt from E 1908	(9615)	Rebuilt to G1 1925	
1369	Rebuilt from B 1907		Rebuilt to G1 1922	

LMS numbers in parentheses were not carried prior to rebuilding as G1 or withdrawal.
