= Tx26-427 =

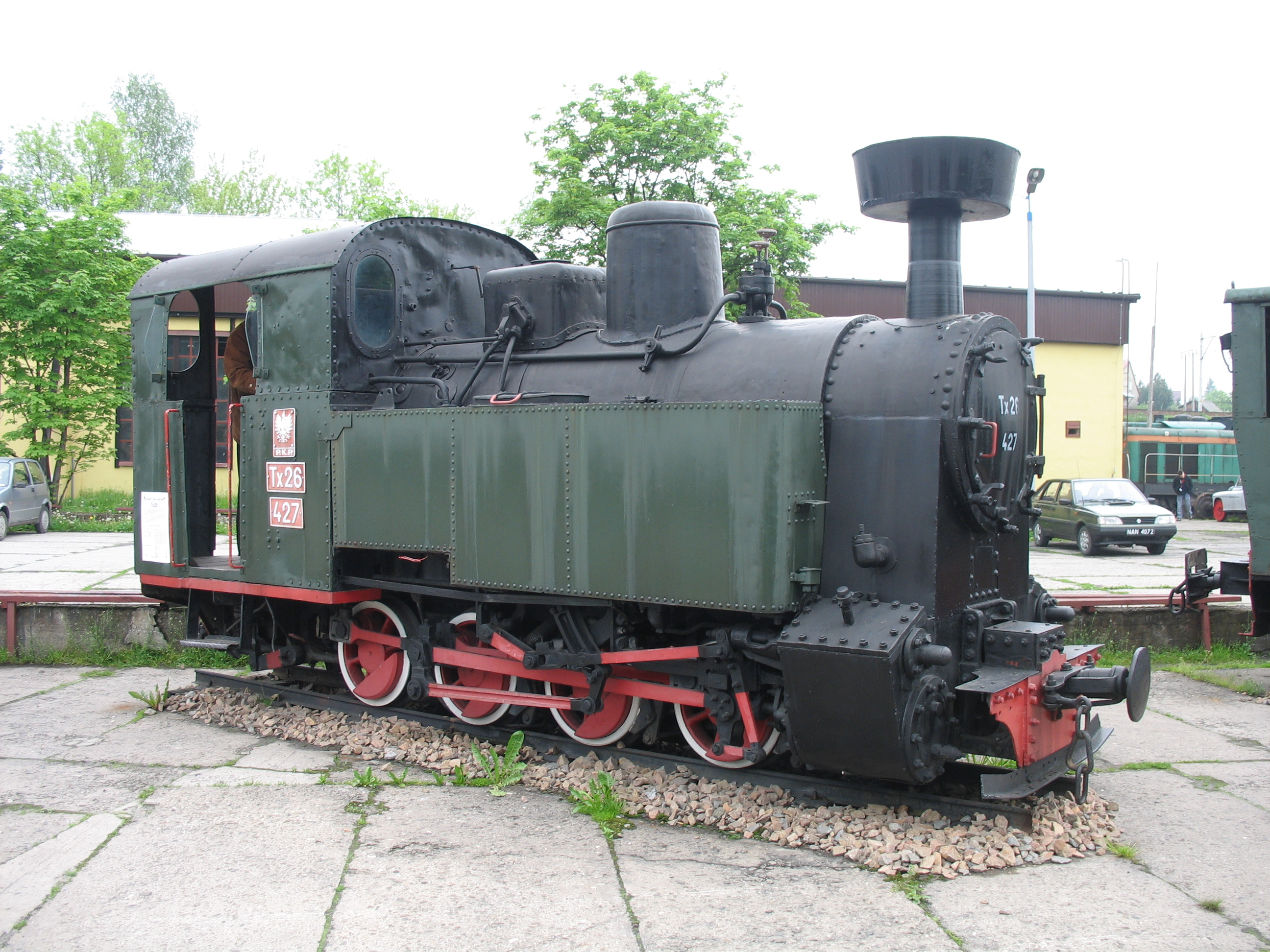
- Tx26-427 in Railway Museum in Chabówka
Type and origin
- Power type: steam
- Builder: Fablok
- Serial number: 179
- Model: W2A
- Build date: 1928
- Total produced: 1
Specifications
- Configuration
  - Whyte: 0-8-0T
  - UIC: D (full: Dn2t)
- Gauge: 600 mm (1 ft 11 5/8 in)
- Driver dia.: 650 mm (26 in)
- Minimum curve: 30 m (98 ft)
- Wheelbase: 2,400 mm (7 ft 10 in)
  - Coupled: 800 mm (2 ft 7 in)
- Length: 6,130 mm (20 ft 1 in)
- Width: 1,840 mm (6 ft 0 in)
- Height: 2,980 mm (9 ft 9 in)
- Axle load: 4.4 t
- Loco weight: 17.7 t
- Fuel type: coal
- Fuel capacity: 0.5 t coal, 1.5 m³ water
- Firebox
  - Grate area: 0.88 m^{2} (9.5 sq ft)
- Boiler pressure: 12 kg/cm²
- Heating surface: 31.2 m^{2} (336 sq ft)
- Cylinders: 2
- Cylinder size: 285 mm (11.2 in) bore × 350 mm (14 in) stroke
- Valve gear: Heusinger
- Loco brake: Steam and hand
Performance figures
- Maximum speed: 30 km/h (19 mph)
- Power output: 100 hp
- Tractive effort: 3150 kg
Career
- Operators: Polish State Railways (PKP)
- Current owner: Railway Museum in Chabówka
- Disposition: exhibit

Tx26-427 is a preserved Polish 600 mm (1 ft 11 5/8 in) narrow gauge steam locomotive built by Fablok in Chrzanów, Poland. It was the only locomotive of Fablok W2A type, included into PKP class Tx26 along with W1A type.

== History ==
In 1927 Polish Ministry of Military Affairs ordered a universal narrow gauge tank locomotive for field railways in the First Locomotive Factory in Poland (Fablok), fit for easy conversion to 600 or 750 mm track gauge. It was newly designed in Fablok and designated as W2A type. It was a D (0-8-0T) axle arrangement tank locomotive, powered by a simple twin engine, working on a saturated steam, developing 100 hp power output (Dn2t). The locomotive was completed in Fablok (serial number 179), although a chassis with engines was made by Warsaw Steam Locomotive Building Factory (WSABP), and a boiler by Fitzner-Gamper-Zieleniewski in Sosnowiec.

The locomotive was completed in 1928, but in spite of a successful design, a military commission refused to accept it, for unclear reasons. Instead, it was bought for Polish State Railways, with a number D3-1002. It stationed first in Lipno depot, on 600 mm (1 ft 11 5/8 in) gauge Lubicz - Sierpc line. After the line was replaced by a standard gauge one in November 1937, it was moved to Myszyniec, working on Ostrołęka railway (it is not clear, if it was done in 1938 or 1940, after working on Jędrzejów railway in the meantime). During World War II, the Germans, who took over Polish railways, renumbered it as 99 1575. After the war, in 1947 the locomotive was given a designation Tx3-427. According to new regulations, in 1961 the locomotive was included into Tx26 class and renumbered to Tx26-427 (tank locomotive, x - D axle arrangement, 26 – Polish origin locomotive designed in 1926, which in this case was an error). Along with it, Tx26 class included W1A type locomotives.

After the war the locomotive worked still on Ostrołęka railway. It was usually used with an additional tender. In 1973 it was withdrawn, pending a main repair, but instead, in 1975 it was given to Railway Museum in Warsaw. The locomotive was stored in a bad condition on a side track in Biskupin, and only in 1993 it was given to a museum depot in Chabówka, where it was reconstructed and placed on exhibition.

== See also ==
- Narrow gauge railways in Poland
