= Vistula Narrow-gauge Railway =

Railway line in Poland

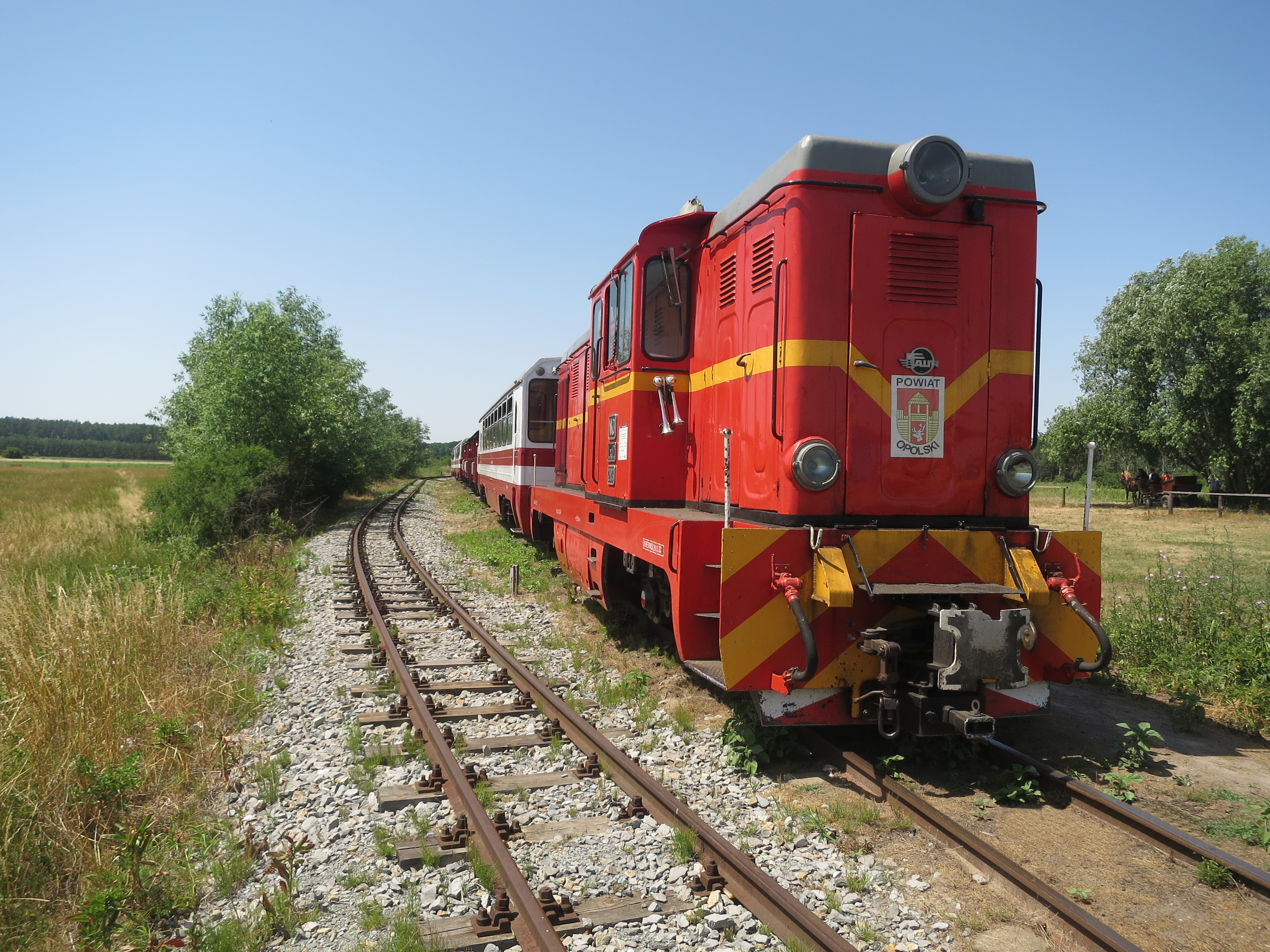
Stop at Polanówka station. Lxd2 locomotive in the foreground.

The Vistula Narrow-gauge Railway (formerly the Nałęczów Commuter Railway; ab. VNG) is a historic narrow gauge railroad operating on 750 mm gauge in the western part of the Lublin Voivodeship, in the counties of Opole and Puławy as the only operating narrow gauge railroad in the voivodeship. The central station and its technical facilities are at Karczmiska Pierwsze station; there is a connection between the VNG and the standard gauge railroad on the Dęblin - Lublin section at Nałęczów Narrow Gauge station.

The railroad is currently owned by the County of Opole and operated by the County Roads Administration in Opole Lubelskie in Poniatowa. Every Sunday from May to the end of September rides are held on the route Karczmiska - Opole Narrow Gauge - Karczmiska - Polanówka - Karczmiska combined with a BBQ and a tour of the historic train station; occasionally other attractions such as movie screenings are also available.

== History ==
=== Origins - the sugar railroad ===
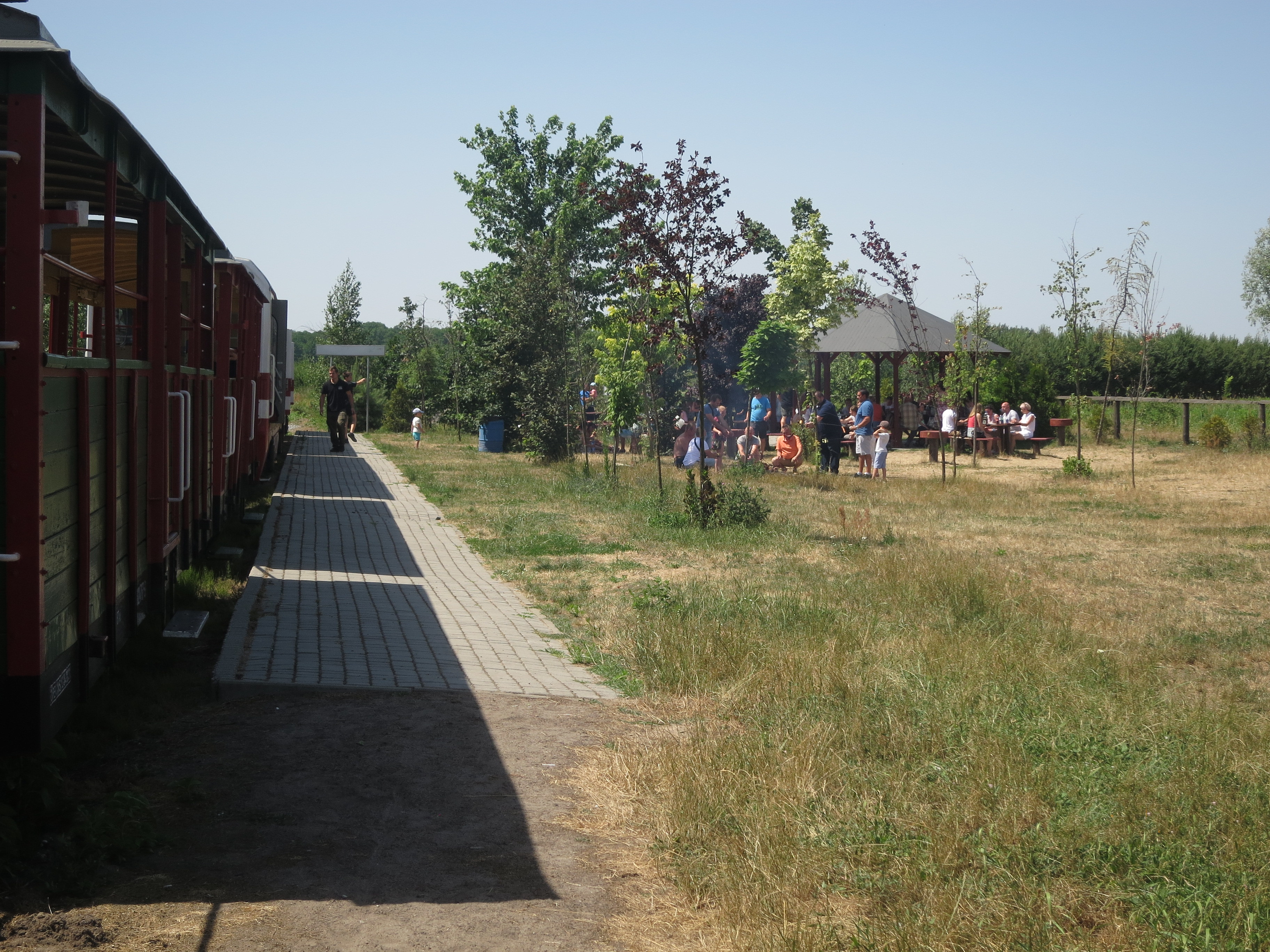
View of the Polanówka station.

Jan Kleniewski, a local landowner and industrialist, owner of the Zagłoba sugar factory was the initiator of the construction of railroads in the area. In the years 1892-1893 a provisional railroad with wooden rails operated for a short time between the Polanówka farmstead and the sugar factory. Initially, 5–6-ton wagons were pulled by horses. In 1900 a 750 mm railroad was built between Zagłoba, the farm in Brzozowa and the station in Kępa Chotecka. Until 1914 the Kleniewski family systematically extended the railroad: in 1911 a section Zagłoba-Wymysłwów with a branch line Szczekarków - Wilków - Vistula bank was created. Initially, the railway was operated by horses (the rolling stock consisted of 10 wagons, 2 platforms and several horses), and the first steam locomotives were purchased in 1912.

At the same time a separate railroad to service the Opole sugar factory was created: in 1908 a line was built between the sugar factory and the peat mine in Łaziska, while in 1911-1913 a section was built to the port in Piotrawin.

In the summer of 1915 retreating Russian soldiers destroyed both the sugar plants and their railroad - they dismantled the tracks and drowned the rolling stock in the Vistula.

=== Times of splendor - public railroad ===
After the Russians withdrew, the area fell under Austrian occupation. The Kleniewski family rebuilt some sections of the railroad and on October 1, 1916, a new section was opened to the Wąwolnica (now Nałęczów) station. Regular passenger traffic was introduced on the Wąwolnica-Opole route.

After WWI the railroad - 54 km in total - was taken over by the Ministry of Railways, later part of it returned into private hands so that by 1928 43 km were state owned. The railroad was listed in the PKP documents in the 1920s as the "Nałęczów-Opole line with the Karczmiska-Rybaki branch", scheduled passenger trains ran only on the Wąwolnica/Nałęczów-Opole route; they were operated partially by diesel cars. There were also tourist trains on the route Piotrawin - Nałęczów. In 1938 the name "Nałęczów Commuter Railway" was introduced and the branch line to Poniatowa electrotechnical plants was built within the Central Industrial District.

Traffic was operated by steam locomotives purchased from the Kolomenskoe Steam Locomotive Factory in Russia, which were known as "kolomyyke" or "samovarka" and ran until the 1950s. In the 1920s larger 8- and 15-ton cars were also imported, and a steam locomotive was added in the following decade, this time a domestically manufactured 40-ton Px29. The Kleniewski family continued to invest in the railroad, purchasing two locomotives. In the interwar period they added further sections of track, to Opole Lubelskie and Piotrawin.

Alongside the PKP lines, in the interwar period, the Opole Sugar Factory had railroads to Piotrawin and its sidings (horse traction) and a newly constructed one to Świdno (steam traction); there were also tracks for handcarts within the sugar factory itself. Passenger trains sometimes ran on the sugar lines. Moreover, another line, Szczekarków-Wilków-Vistula bank, existed (a fragment to the Vistula was later dismantled), as well as a private horse-drawn railroad, Niezabitów-Łubki, probably dismantled shortly after World War II.

During World War II the Zagłoba-Kępa Chotecka line was rebuilt again (in 1942), and an industrial railroad was established in Bełżyce, which was planned to connect with the Nałęczów Commuter Railway. During the occupation the Germans arranged a camp for Soviet prisoners of war and Jews in Poniatowa, using the railroad to transport them. In 1944 the Nazi occupant took away part of the rolling stock and sunk a part of it in the Vistula River. The remainder, thanks to the generosity of local people, was hidden in the forests near Vistula. The motorized carriages belonging to the railroad were found after the war in Wrocław.

After the war the PKP took over the last section belonging to the Kleniewski family (to Piotrawin), planning to connect it, via a bridge over the Vistula, with Starachowice (only a short Starachowice-Iłża section was built). In the post-war period, the PKP introduced courses to Poniatowa and to Wilków (in the 1950s), however in the 1960s passenger traffic to Wilków was cancelled and this section again served only for the transport of goods.

A bypass was built in 1959 on the sugar factory line between Opole and Piotrawin to go around the village of Niezdów due to the fire hazard posed by the steam locomotives. About a decade later the sugar plant liquidated its rail network: in 1968 the line to Piotrawin was dismantled, and in 1970 the one to Świdno. The tracks to Kępa Chotecka via ZPOW Zagłoba were also dismantled - in the first stage the section Brzozowa-Kępa Chotecka, then the rest.

However, the PKP continued to modernize its network: in 1968 Romanian Lxd2 diesel locomotives were introduced, which marked the beginning of the end of steam locomotives - the last steam locomotive, Px48, was withdrawn in 1980. Transporters for standard-gauge wagons were also introduced, as well as heavier rails adapted to the new rolling stock. In 1988 new Bxhpi coaches, also of Romanian manufacture, were introduced.

In 1990 the railroad employed 253 workers. After 1989 freight and passenger transport began to fall sharply. In 1991 passenger trains to Poniatowa stopped running, and four years later the last permanent passenger connection to Opole was cancelled. Instead, special tourist trains were introduced. In 1994 3,400 people were transported in 35 tourist trains, in 1998 17,063 people in 187 trains. In 1998, 15,000 tons of goods were also transported, mainly fine coal. However, the railroad continued to generate losses and at the end of 2001, PKP ceased operations altogether. In 1999 a truck damaged the viaduct in Rogalów.

=== Recent history - the tourist railroad ===
PKP handed over the entire railroad to the county office in Opole Lubelskie: in 2002 the tracks and rolling stock were transferred, and in 2008 also the land and buildings. The county authorities chose a new operator, Local Train Carriage Association (Polish: Stowarzyszenie Kolejowych Przewozów Lokalnych, ab. SKPL), which ran the railway from 2003 to 2008. Regular runs of the tourist train "Nadwiślanin" were conducted during this period: on selected Sundays from April to October on the route Nałęczów Wąsk. - Karczmiska Polana together with a BBQ organized in a forest glade, and once a year in September the so-called "pilgrimage train" on the route Opole Wąsk. - Wąwolnica - Nałęczów Wąsk. - Wąwolnica (in the 2008 season the route was shortened to Wąwolnica due to damage to the viaduct); special journeys were also made on request on any available section. The resumption of freight transport was also planned, however, only one such transport was carried out - in 2003. At the end of 2008 SKPL resigned from the management of the railroad due to unprofitability.

The County Roads Management in Opole Lubelskie became the new operator and in summer 2011 the railroad resumed its operation under the new name "Nadwiślańska Kolejka Wąskotorowa" (Vistula Narrow Gauge Railway).

In 2012, the railroad transported over 13,000 people. In the 2013 season (May–September) the railroad operated between Karczmiska and Polanówka, Karczmiska and Opole Lubelskie and between Karczmiska and Poniatowa.

In 2018, the railroad carried 19,800 passengers. At that time, it operated a track length of 20 km.

== Existing sections ==
- Nałęczów Narrow Gauge (junction with normal rail network) - Wąwolnica - Niezabitów - Obliźniak (passenger stop) - Wymysłów - Karczmiska Pierwsze
- Karczmiska Pierwsze - Głusko (passenger stop) - Leszczyniec - Rozalin
- Rozalin - Opole Narrow Gauge
  - siding at Opole Narrow Gauge station - tobacco warehouses in Opole Lubelskie, not available due to liquidation of the turnout at the station
  - siding at Opole Narrow Gauge station - Opole Sugar Refinery, within the area of the sugar refinery itself most of the tracks have already been removed
- Rozalin – Poniatowa
  - railway siding to former State Agricultural Society in Poniatowa, inaccessible due to missing part of tracks
  - railway siding to former "Eda" plant in Poniatowa, within the area of the plant itself the tracks have already been removed
- Karczmiska Pierwsze - Karczmiska Polana - Polanówka - Żmijowiska - Urządków - Wilków Narrow Gauge, due to the theft of tracks between Polanówka and Żmijowiska in 2004 only part of this section from Karczmiska is currently available

=== The naming of stations/stops is based on the latest PKP timetables ===
- Karczmiska Polana – a stop for tourist traffic, established after the liquidation of regular passenger traffic
- Leszczyniec - found only in the oldest timetables, until 1924.
- Nałęczów Narrow Gauge - original name (according to 1918 timetable): Wąwolnica H.B., later Wąwolnica Dworzec ("Station") and Wąwolnica Wąska ("Narrow"), current name introduced in 1925, this station (and Nałęczów station tangential to it) is located in Drzewce-Kolonia village
- Wąwolnica - original name (according to 1918 timetable): Wąwolnica Std., later Wąwolnica Miasto ("City"), current name introduced in 1925
- Wilków Narrow Gauge. - the station is located in the village of Wilków-Kolonia
- Żmijowiska - original name (according to the 1926 census): Szczekarków, the station was located in the village of Szczekarków-Kolonia

== Closed sections ==
- private horse railroad Niezabitów - Łubki, a short side-track from Niezabitów station to the other side of the road operated there later
- siding on the Rozalin - Opole Wąsk. route in the village of Ruda Opolska
- siding Opole Wąsk. - PZGS in Opole Lubelskie
- former GS in Poniatowa - town center of Poniatowa
- siding on the Karczmiska - Polanówka trail to the gravel pit near the village of Karczmiska Pierwsze
- siding in Żmijowiska - brickyard in Szczekarkowo-Kolonia, it is possible that a separate railroad to the pit also existed in this brickyard
- Żmijowiska - fruit and vegetable processing plant (originally a sugar plant) Zagłoba - Brzozowa Farm (now the village of Kolonia Brzozowa) - Kępa Chotecka (Vistula shore)
- siding in the village of Zagłoba along the road
- Wilków Wąsk. - the bank of Vistula near the village of Machów-Czupel

Note: Zagłoba is listed in the 1926 PKP list of stations, stops and cargo depots under the name Rybaki.

=== Decommissioned railroads of Opole Sugar Refinery, which were connected to narrow gauge railroad through the sugar refinery ===
- Opole Sugar Refinery - Świdno
- siding to the District Dairy Cooperative in Opole Lubelskie
- siding between the villages of Skoków and Puszno Skokowskie
- siding in the village of Puszno Skokowskie
- Opole Sugar Refinery - Niezdów - Łaziska - Janiszów - Piotrawin (Vistula shore)
- by-pass of the village Niezdów
- Łaziska - Łaziska Średnie Farm
- siding in the village of Łaziska
- Janiszów – Głodno

== Other decommissioned narrow-gauge railroads in the vicinity of Nałęczów ==
- Bełżyce commercial railroad - probably 750 mm gauge, built in 1940/41, planned to connect with the Vistula Narrow Gauge, dismantled by the local population immediately after the war (1944/45).
- Garbów Sugar Refinery Railway - there was a 750 mm narrow gauge network north of the Nałęczów station that belonged to the Garbów Sugar Refinery, which also had connections with the normal gauge network at this station. Despite this, and despite the same track gauge, the sugar factory's railroad had no permanent direct connection with the Vistula Narrow Gauge which ran there from the opposite side. Rolling stock was exchanged between the two narrow gauge railroads using platforms made of movable spans, which were temporarily placed across the normal gauge line.
- Lublin Sugar Refinery Railway - one of the narrow-gauge lines of the Lublin Sugar Refinery was located east of Nałęczów, near Sadurki station which was later operated by Garbów Sugar Refinery
- Łopatki Brickyard Railway - probably 600 mm gauge, initially operated from the brickyard to the loading house at the Łopatki standard gauge station (now a passenger stop), later relocated to operate from the brickyard to the clay pit, liquidated in the 1990s.

== Rolling stock ==
- Diesel locomotives Lxd2-283 and 297 in working condition, Lxd2-348 withdrawn
- A20D-P series Bxhpi passenger coaches manufactured by FAUR.
- Open summer passenger coaches series BTxhi.
- Inoperative CWO Lyd2-02
