= Pennsylvania Railroad class C1 =

Pennsylvania Railroad C1
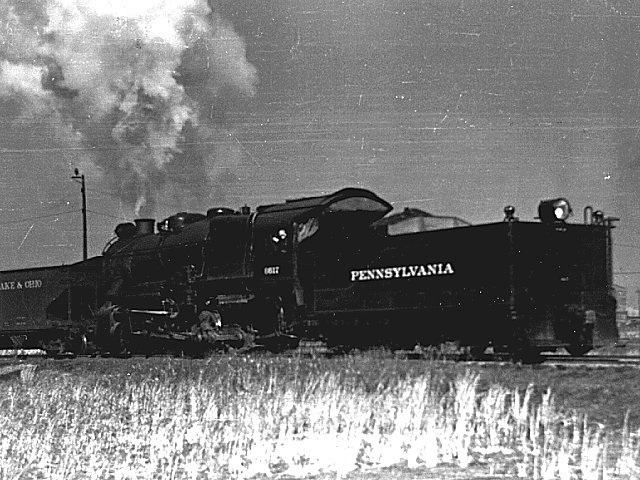
Type and origin
- Power type: Steam
- Builder: Pennsylvania Railroad
- Build date: 1925, 1927
- Total produced: 90
Specifications
- Configuration
  - Whyte: 0-8-0
  - UIC: Dh
- Driver: 3rd coupled axle
- Gauge: 4 ft 8 1/2 in (1,435 mm)
- Driver dia.: 56 in (1.422 m)
- Tender wheels: 33 in (0.84 m)
- Wheelbase: 15 ft 9 in (4.80 m)
  - Axle spacing (Asymmetrical): 5 ft 3 in (1.60 m)
- Length: 68 ft 4 1/4 in (20.83 m)
- Width: 10 ft 6 1/4 in (3.21 m)
- Height: 14 ft 11 7/16 in (4.56 m)
- Axle load: 74,000 lb (33.6 t)
- Adhesive weight: 278,000 lb (126.1 t)
- Loco weight: 278,000 lb (126.1 t)
- Tender weight: 156,000 lb (70.8 t)
- Fuel type: Bituminous coal
- Fuel capacity: 15.5 short tons (14.1 t)
- Water cap.: 7300 US gallons (6100 imp gal; 28,000 L)
- Firebox
  - Grate area: 61.6 sq ft (5.72 m^{2})
- Boiler pressure: 250 psi (1.72 MPa)
- Cylinders: Two
- Cylinder size: 27 in × 30 in (686 mm × 762 mm)
- Valve gear: Walschaerts
- Valve type: Piston
Performance figures
- Tractive effort: 76,154 lbf (338.7 kN)
Career
- Numbers: 6550–6639
- Retired: 1948–1953
- Disposition: All scrapped

The PRR C1 was the Pennsylvania Railroad's class of 0-8-0 steam locomotive, used in switching service. The locomotive type was built at the railroad's Juniata shops in Altoona, Pennsylvania and introduced in 1925.

The 0-8-0 was common on most railroads, but not on PRR; when the railroad needed larger motive power, they used the 2-8-0 "Consolidation". The PRR wanted the best motive power for switching duties at rail yards and interchanges, and the C1 class was the heaviest two-cylinder 0-8-0 switcher ever produced. Calculated tractive effort was 76,154 lb, based on 78% MEP with 60% maximum cutoff. All C1s were withdrawn and scrapped between 1948 and 1953.
