= Narrow-gauge railways in Poland =

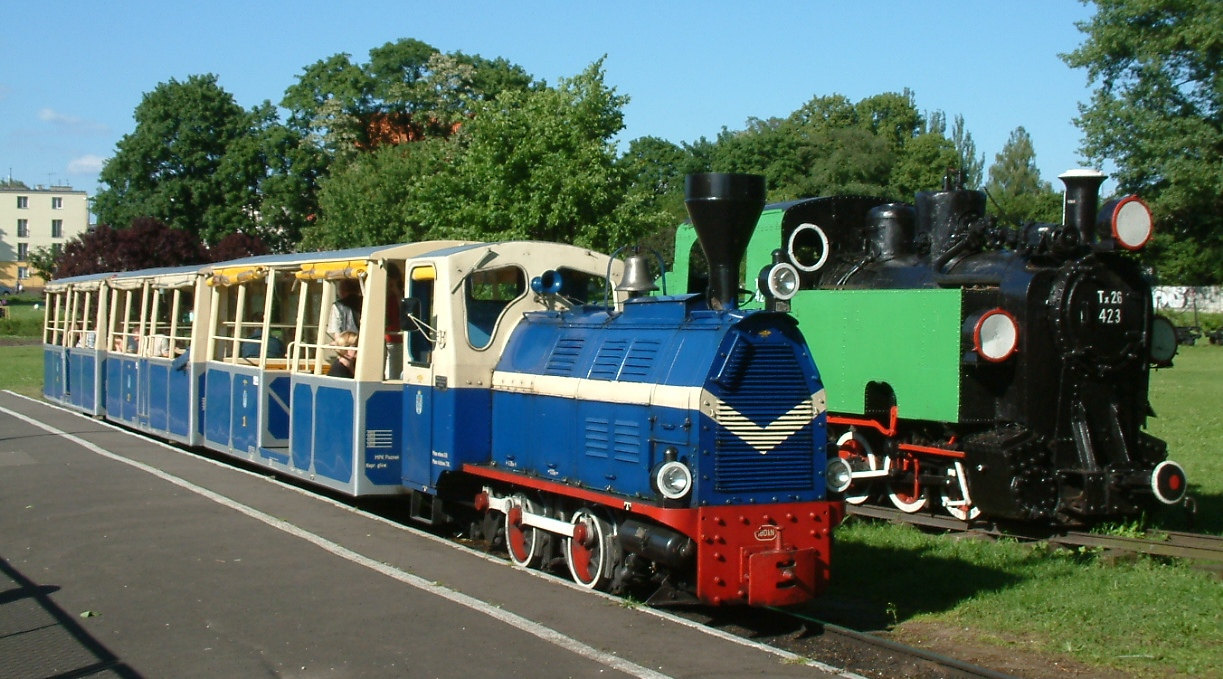
Kolejka Parkowa Maltanka – 600 mm (1 ft 11 5/8 in) gauge in Poznań

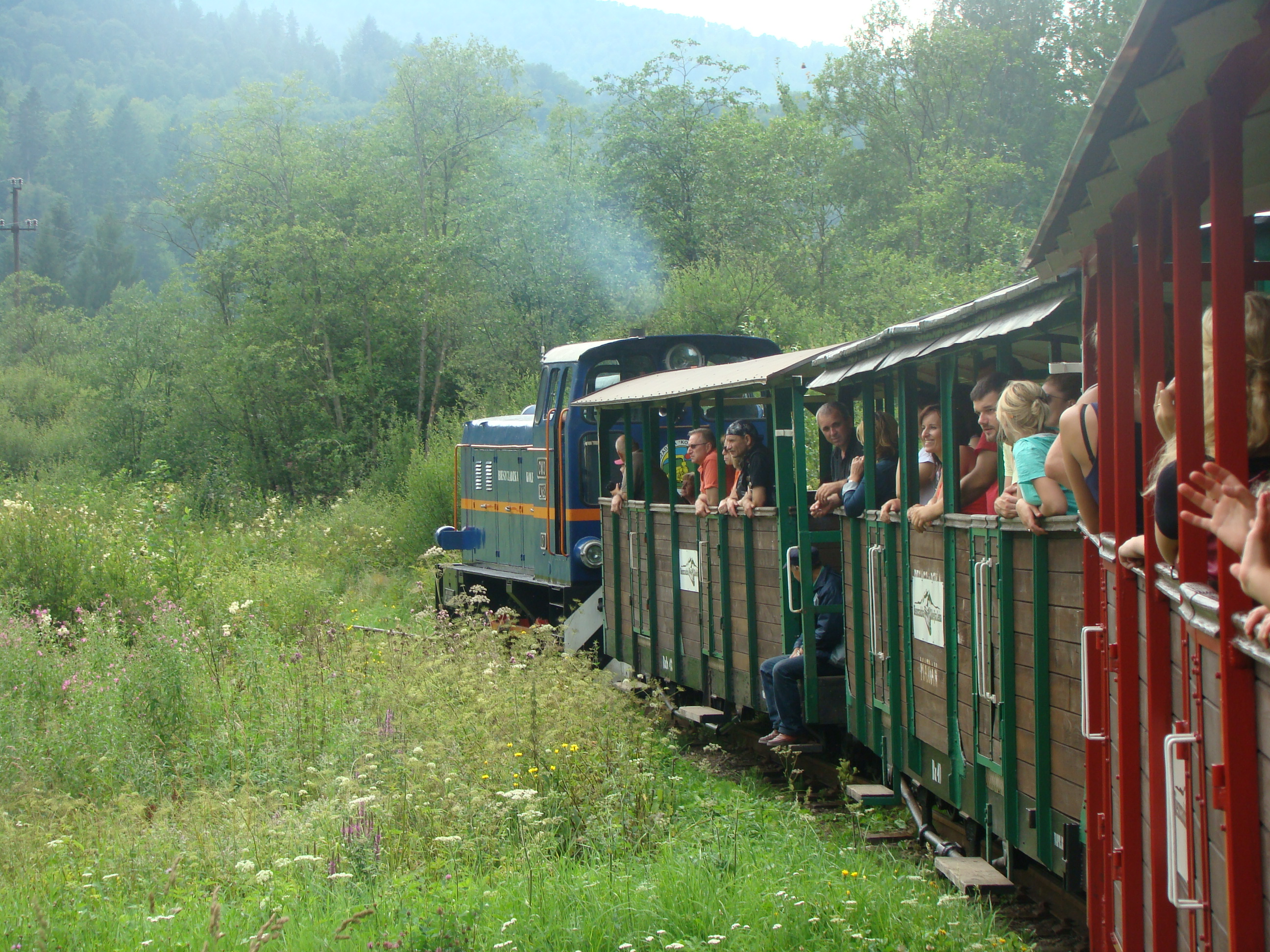
Tourist Bieszczadzka Forest Railway 750mm gauge

There are hundreds of kilometres of 600 mm (1 ft 11 5/8 in), 750 mm (2 ft 5 1/2 in), 785 mm (2 ft 6 29/32 in), and 1,000 mm (3 ft 3 3/8 in) narrow-gauge lines in Poland. The metre-gauge lines are mostly found in the northwest part of the country in Pomerania, while 785 mm (2 ft 6 29/32 in) lines are found only in the Upper Silesia region. 750 mm (2 ft 5 1/2 in) is the most commonly used narrow gauge; it is used, for example, in the Rogów Narrow Gauge Railway (Rogowska Kolej Wąskotorowa) and in Tarnowskie Góry with the world's oldest narrow-gauge railway in continuous service since 1853. Some narrow-gauge lines in Poland still operate as common carrier (for example the lines operated by SKPL, the Association of Local Railway Haulage), while others survive as tourist attractions. One of the finest of the latter is the 600 mm (1 ft 11 5/8 in) narrow-gauge railway (Żnińska Kolej Powiatowa) running from Żnin via Wenecja and Biskupin to Gąsawa in the Pałuki region. Railway traditions of Pałuki date back to July 1894 when the first two lines were opened.

From 1930s until the 1960s most of 600mm gauge lines were converted to 750mm (in the meantime, after World War II Poland lost territories in the east and acquired territories in the west and north). After the war, in 1948–1949, 2984 km of local public railways were nationalized and taken over by the Polish State Railways (PKP). As a result, in 1950 there were 4,146 km (2,576 mi) of PKP narrow-gauge lines, including 1,293 km (803 mi) of 600mm gauge and 1,127 km (700 mi) of 750mm gauge. There were also 914 km (568 mi) of 1,000 mm (3 ft 3 3/8 in) gauge public railways, mostly on ex-German territories. In the 1950s and 1960s, 748 km (465 mi) of 600mm gauge and 275 km (171 mi) of other lines were converted to 750mm. There were also 951 km (591 mi) of forest railways and 724 km (450 mi) of sugar beet railways in 1950, and a number of isolated industrial railways. From the 1960s, narrow-gauge railways started to decline, with the development of road transport. The service on narrow-gauge lines were continued by PKP until 2001. As of 2021, the only narrow-gauge line in Poland with all-year revenue passenger service is Pleszew Local Railway, a 3 km (1.9 mi) line linking a town of Pleszew with a mainline station located in a nearby village of Kowalew. But this is a 3-rail route, and only the standard gauge is daily used. The narrow gauge track is used on some Sundays. Exploitation of both is by SKPL, the only railway company with two different track-gauges in Poland.

In the past, there have also been 760 mm (2 ft 5 15/16 in), 800 mm (2 ft 7 1/2 in) and 900 mm (2 ft 11 7/16 in) lines. A 900 mm (2 ft 11 7/16 in) recreational line 4.2 km (2.6 mi) long had been operating in the Amusement-Recreation Park in Chorzów (now converted to 785 mm), Upper Silesia . A similar 600 mm (1 ft 11 5/8 in) line, Kolejka Parkowa Maltanka, operates in Poznań. Some of Poland's narrow-gauge railways are maintained by volunteers; one organization dedicated to preserving narrow-gauge railways is the FPKW, the Polish Narrow Gauge Railways Foundation.

A few tramways also use 1000mm gauge, in Bydgoszcz, Elbląg, Grudziądz, Łódź and Toruń.

== Overview ==
1,000 mm (3 ft 3 3/8 in)

- Piaseczno Narrow Gauge Railway, tourist railway
- Koleje wąskotorowe na Pomorzu Zachodnim, several systems including the Seaside Narrow-Gauge Railway, tourist railway (30 km)

800 mm (2 ft 7 1/2 in)

- Kolej Jabłonowska, defunct

785 mm (2 ft 6 29/32 in)

- Górnośląskie Koleje Wąskotorowe (Upper-Silesian narrow-gauge railways), now a tourist railway (21+6 km; 13+3.7 mi)
- Zabytkowa Stacja Kolei Wąskotorowej w Rudach, tourist railway

750 mm (2 ft 5 1/2 in)

- Bieszczadzka Kolejka Leśna, partly a tourist railway
- Ełk Narrow Gauge Railway, regauged from 1000 mm in 1951, tourist railway (15 km; 9.3 mi)
- Gnieźnieńska Kolej Wąskotorowa, regauged from 600 mm in 1957, tourist railway
- Kaliska Kolej Dojazdowa, tourist railway
- Kolejka Opalenicka, defunct
- Krośniewicka Kolej Dojazdowa, defunct but plans to renew
- Marecka Kolej Dojazdowa, regauged from 800 mm in 1951, defunct
- Vistula Narrow Gauge Railway, tourist railway
- Pleszewska Kolej Lokalna, revenue passenger service by SKPL between Pleszew and Kowalew.
- Przeworska Kolej Dojazdowa, regauged from 760 mm, tourist railway (46 km; 29 mi)
- Rogowska Kolej Wąskotorowa, regauged from 600 mm, tourist railway (49 km; 30 mi)
- Śmigielska Kolej Dojazdowa, regauged from 1000mm in 1958, tourist railway (17 km; 11 mi)
- Narrow Gauge Railway Museum in Sochaczew, formerly Sochaczewska Kolej Powiatowa, tourist railway and museum
- Średzka Kolej Powiatowa, regauged from 1000 mm in 1952–54, tourist railway
- Starachowicka Kolej Wąskotorowa, tourist railway
- Świętokrzyska Kolej Dojazdowa, regauged from 600 mm in 1951, tourist railway
- Witkowska Kolejka Powiatowa; regauged from 600 mm in 1957, defunct
- Żuławska Kolej Dojazdowa, tourist railway

716 mm (2 ft 4 3/16 in)

- Dobre Aleksandrowskie–Kruszwica; defunct

600 mm

- Bydgoskie Koleje Powiatowe; 106 km (66 mi), defunct
- Jarocińska Kolej Dojazdowa; 82.4 km (51.2 mi), defunct
- Koleje wąskotorowe na Pomorzu Zachodnim; several defunct systems
- Kolejka Parkowa Maltanka; operating
- Narrow Gauge Railway Museum in Wenecja (located alongside, but not connected to, the Żnińska Kolej Powiatowa)
- Ortelsburger Kleinbahn, defunct (27 km; 17 mi)
- Wrzesińska Kolejka Powiatowa, defunct (57 km; 35 mi)
- Wyrzyskie Koleje Powiatowe, partly tourist railway (144 km; 89 mi)
- Żnińska Kolej Powiatowa (Żnin district railway), partly tourist railway
