= Park Railway Maltanka =

Coordinates: 52°24′17″N 16°58′30″E

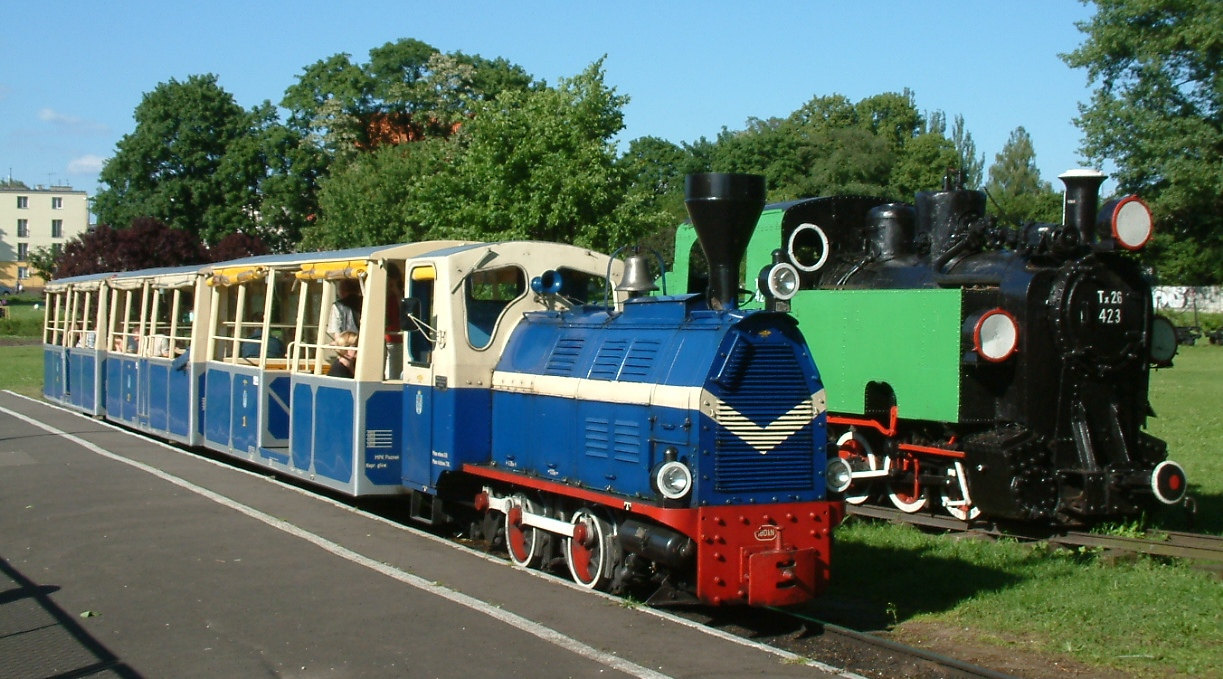
Train on station "Maltanka" pulled by Diesel locomotive Wls40-100

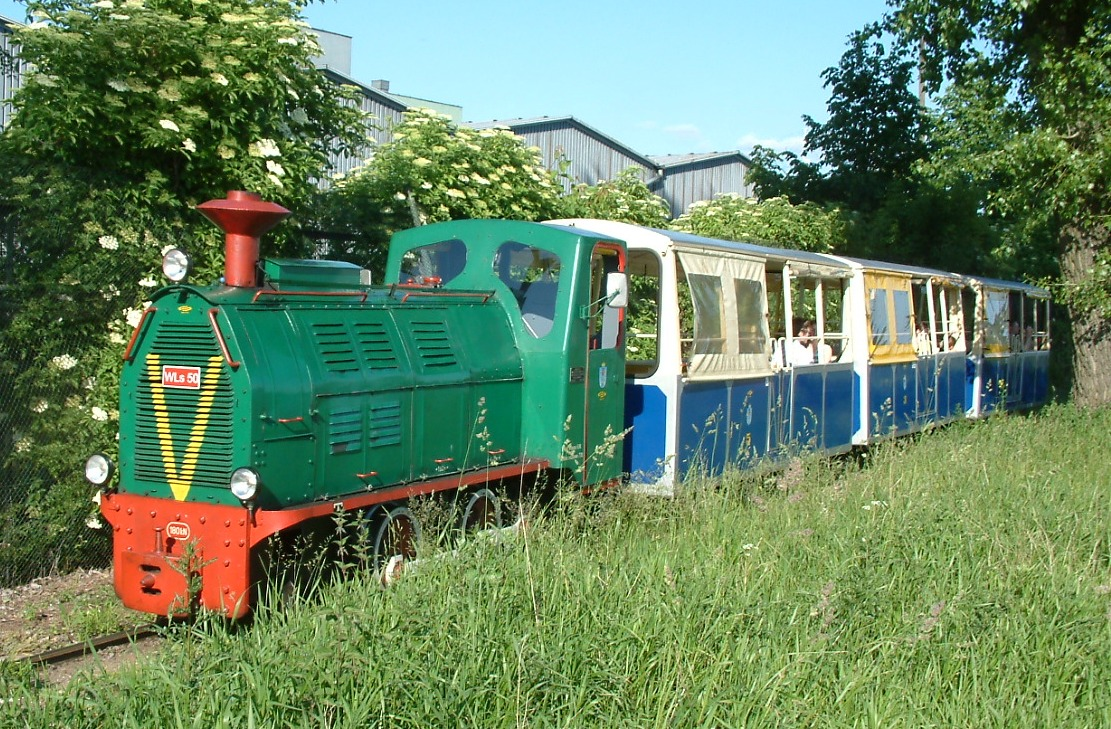
Train pulled by Diesel locomotive Wls50-1563

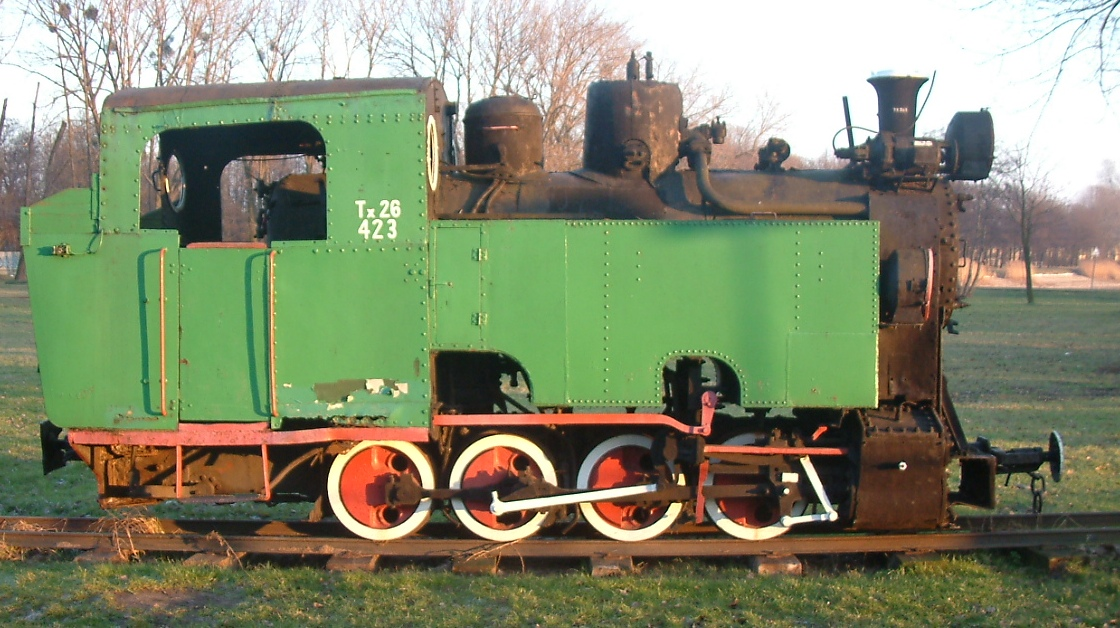
Sitting in rail siding, waiting for renovation tank locomotive Tx26-423 build in 1926

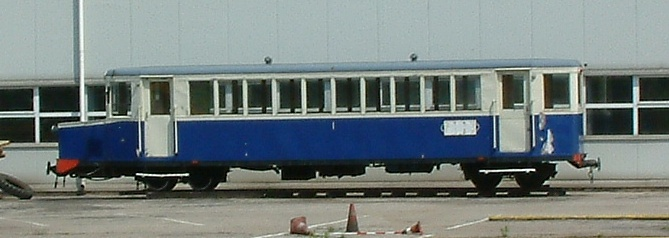
Diesel railcar MBxc1-41 "Ryjek" in Forteczna tram depot

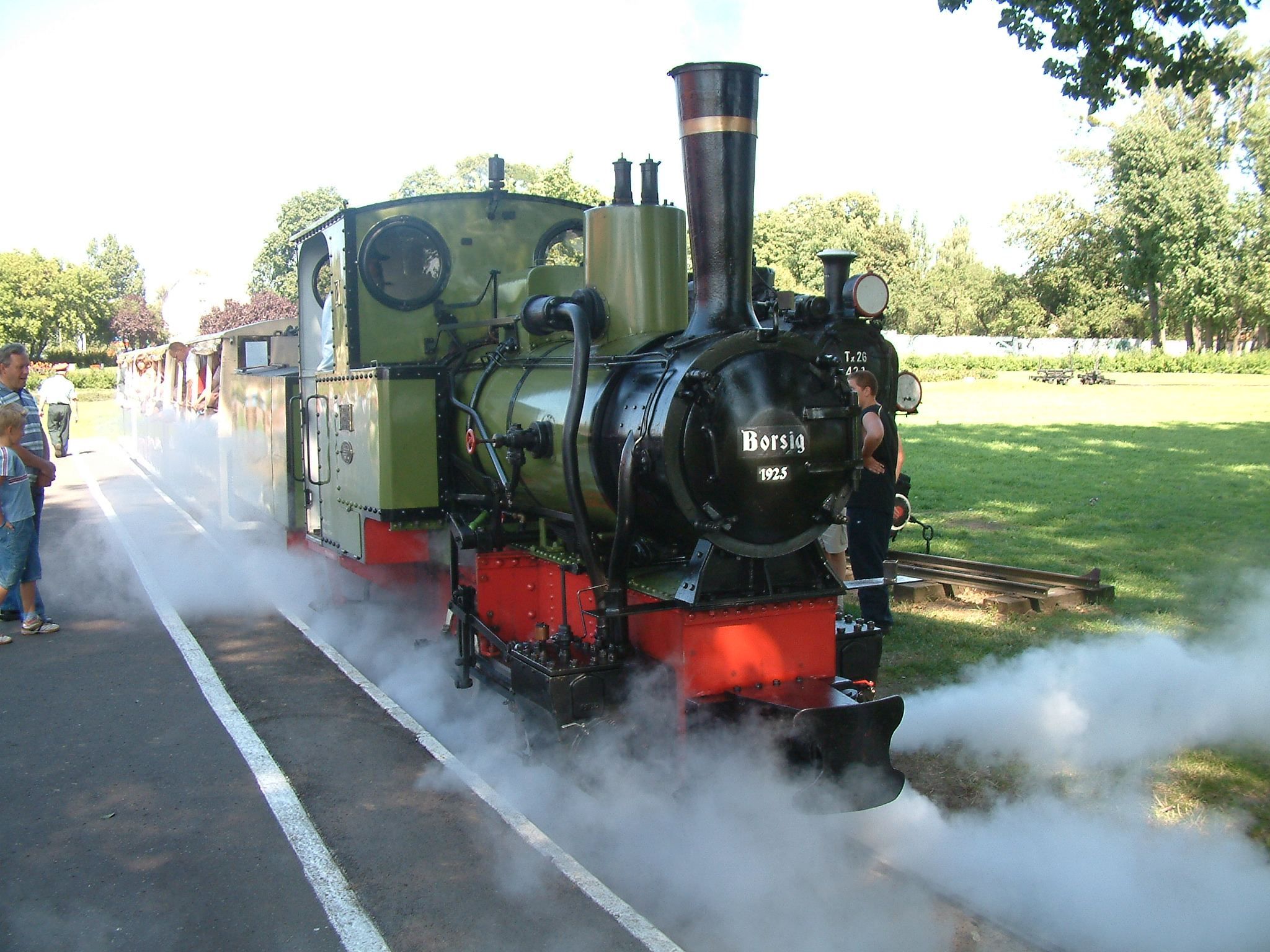
Train on station "Maltanka" pulled by steam locomotive Bn2t 11458 "Borsig" built in 1925

The Park Railway Maltanka (Polish: Kolejka Parkowa Maltanka, sometimes abbreviated to Maltanka) is a 600 mm (1 ft 11 5/8 in) narrow gauge railway located in Poznań. It is 3.85 kilometres (2.4 mi) long and is owned by Miejskie Przedsiębiorstwo Komunikacyjne w Poznaniu Sp. z o.o. (English: Public Transport Company in Poznań Ltd.). The line connects Rondo Śródka (Śródka Roundabout) and New Zoo transporting max. 150.000 passengers annually (e.g. 2019 - 138.122 passengers; 2020 - "Covid year" with extremely low result - 73.502 passengers).

== History ==
The first 600 mm (1 ft 11 5/8 in) narrow gauge railway, called the Harcerska Kolejka Dziecięca (English: Scout Children Railway) in Poznań, was built in 1956 and was operated by Polish Scouting Association (see Children's railway). This 1.5-kilometre (0.9 mi) long route connected Ogród Jordanowski and Łęgi Dębińskie (English: Dębina Meadow). During construction of Hetmańska Str, part of second road ring of Poznań, the authorities decide to move the railway to a new location where the line would not conflict with main communication arteries. The railway, now renamed Maltanka was re-opened on 21 July 1972 in Malta. Since then it has been operated by Public Transport Company. In 1998 its name was changed to Maltańska Kolej Dziecięca (English: Maltan Children's railway), and again in 2002 to its current name.

The name Maltanka comes from the Knights of Malta, who used to own the land and the old church nearby.

In 2013–2022 years the railway carried approximately between 120 and 140 thousand of passengers a year (in 2016: 142,700) and until 2016 it was the second most popular in Poland, then the third (after Seaside and Bieszczady railways).

== Stops ==
- Maltanka
- Ptyś
- Balbinka
- Przystań (planned)
- Zwierzyniec

== Rolling stock ==
- steam locomotive Bn2t 11458 "Borsig" built in 1925
- steam locomotive Tx26 423 built in 1926
- Diesel railcar MBxc1-41 "Ryjek" built in 1932
- Diesel locomotive WLs40-100 built in 1956
- Diesel locomotive WLs40-1225 built in 1961
- Diesel locomotive WLs50-1563 built in 1964
- passenger cars (#1, 2, 3, 4) built in 1956
- passenger cars (#5 and 8) built in 1972
- passenger cars (#6 and 7) built in 2010
