= 0-8-0 =

Locomotive wheel arrangement

0-8-0 (Eight-coupled)

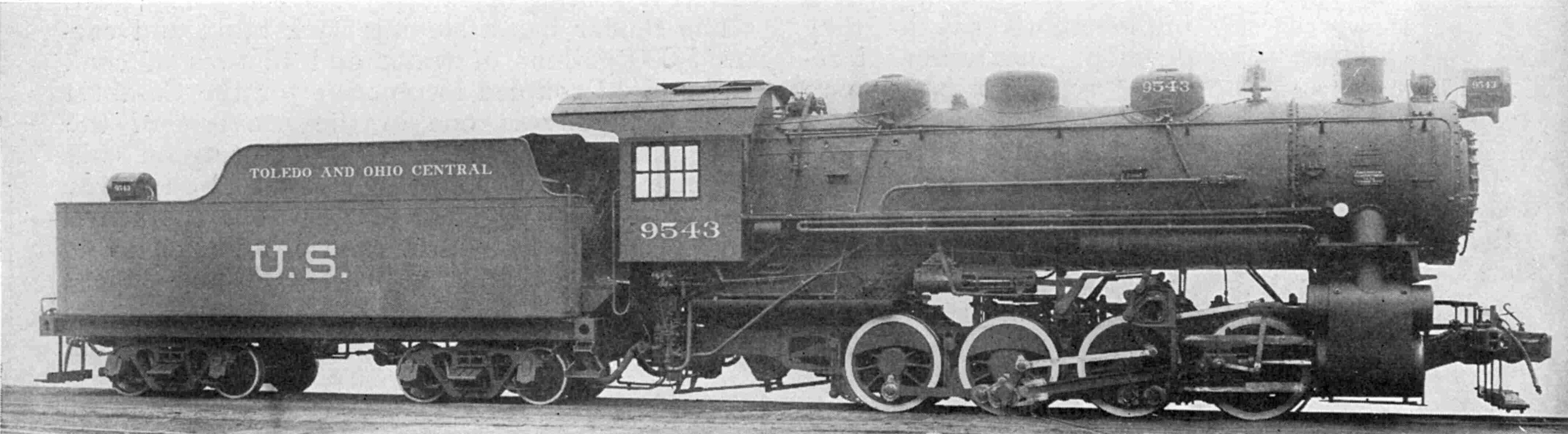
- USRA 0-8-0
Equivalent classifications
- UIC class: D
- French class: 040
- Turkish class: 44
- Swiss class: 4/4
- Russian class: 0-4-0
First known tank engine version
- First use: 1866
- Country: United Kingdom
- Railway: Great Northern Railway
- Designer: Archibald Sturrock
- Builder: Great Northern Railway
- Benefits: Total mass as adhesive weight
- Drawbacks: Instability at speed
First known tender engine version
- First use: 1844
- Country: United States of America
- Locomotive: Mud Digger class
- Railway: Baltimore and Ohio Railroad
- Designer: Ross Winans
- Builder: Ross Winans
- Benefits: Total engine mass as adhesive weight
- Drawbacks: Instability at speed

Under the Whyte notation for the classification of steam locomotives, 0-8-0 represents the wheel arrangement of no leading wheels, eight powered and coupled driving wheels on four axles and no trailing wheels. Locomotives of this type are also referred to as eight coupled.

== Overview ==
Examples of the 0-8-0 wheel arrangement were constructed both as tender and tank locomotives. The earliest locomotives were built for mainline haulage, particularly for freight, but the configuration was later also often used for large switcher locomotives (shunter locomotives).

The wheel arrangement provided a powerful layout with all engine weight as adhesive weight, which maximised the tractive effort and factor of adhesion. The layout was generally too large for smaller and lighter railways, where the more popular 0-6-0 wheel arrangement would often be found performing similar duties.

== Usage ==
=== Austria ===
Two 0-8-0 locomotives were delivered from Andre Koechlin & Cie in Mulhouse to the Austrian Southern Railway in 1862. They were later sent to Italy and worked over the Apennines between Bologna and Pistoja.

=== China ===
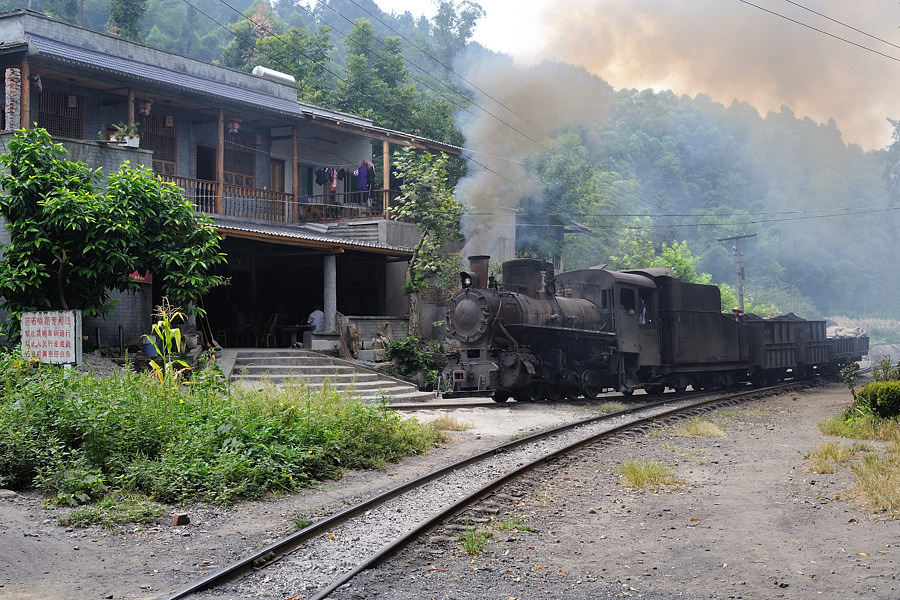
C2 locomotive on Jiayang Coal Railway

In 1952, the Chrzanów works in Poland supplied 81 750 mm (2 ft 5 1/2 in) gauge locomotives, which were later versions of the Russian P24 class. By 1958, China was building their own copies resulting in such classes as the C2, YJ, ZM-4, ZG and ZM16-4.

=== Christmas Island ===
Peckett and Sons of Bristol built a 0-8-0 tender locomotive for the Christmas Island Phosphate Co.'s Railway in 1931.

=== France ===
The "Fortes Rampes" Class of 0-8-0 was designed by Jules Petit for the Chemins de Fer du Nord. built in 1858-1865 a total of 50 were made. They used a unique steam dryer mounted to the top of the boiler. This was similar to the Franco-Crosti boiler developed later.

=== Germany ===
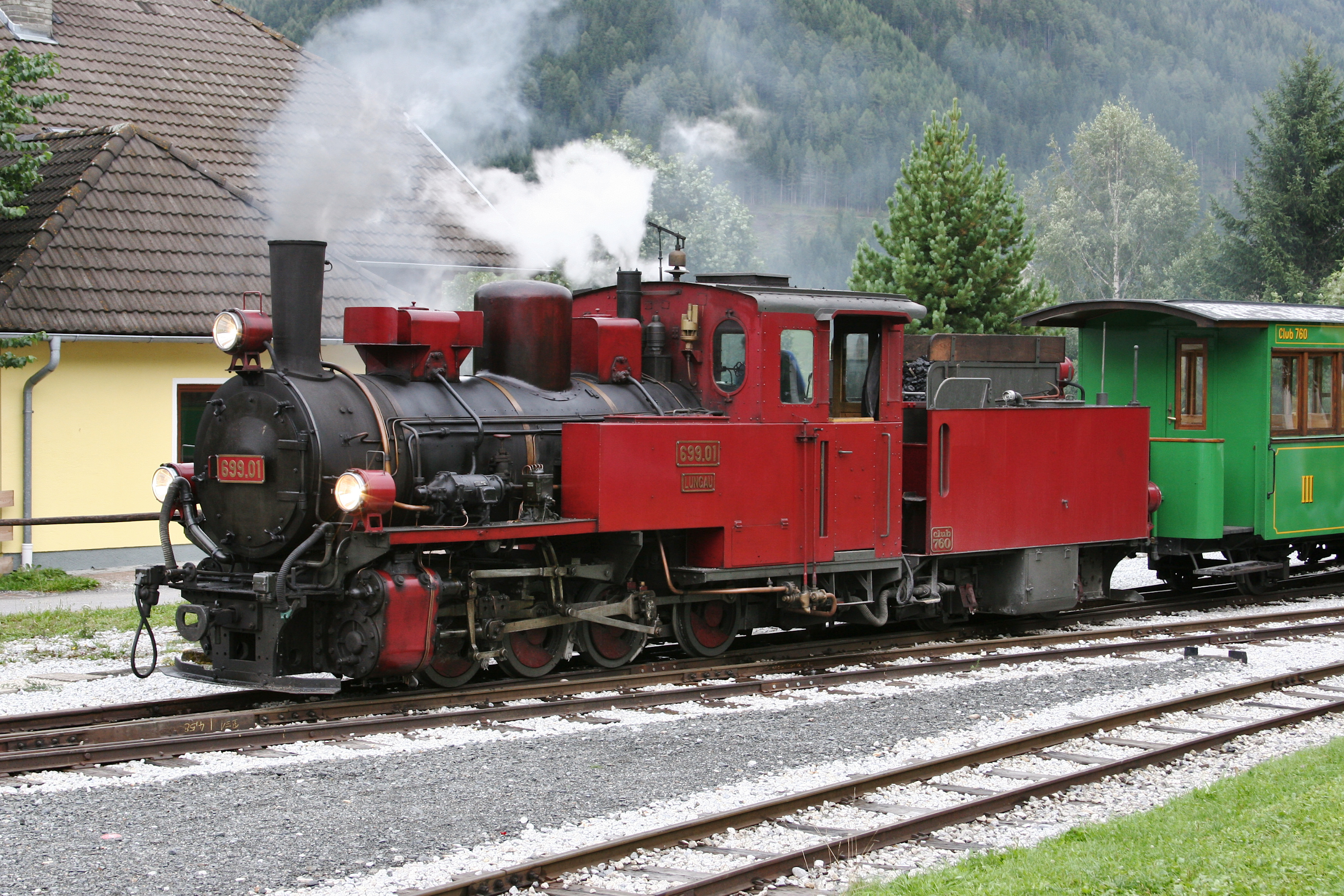
Kriegsdampflokomotive HF 160 D

Freight engines with an 0-8-0 wheel arrangement were once very popular in Germany. The Prussian state railways had several types of 0-8-0s that were all classified as G7, G8 and G9.

The latest of these, the Prussian G 8.1, was the most numerous German state railway locomotive with over five thousand examples being built between 1913 and 1921. They remained in service with the Deutsche Bundesbahn until 1972.

The narrow gauge Heeresfeldbahn class HF 160 D were developed for wartime service during the Second World War. The engines were also classified as Kriegsdampflokomotive 11 (Military steam locomotive 11 or KDL 11). After the war, the locomotives were put to use for civilian purposes.

=== Poland ===
First 0-8-0 polish locomotives were T1D. They were based on german ELNA 6 steam engines. Two engines were ordered by private railway from Rawicz to Kobylin. After 1945 they were introduced to the PKP and classified as TKp30. All units remained in the service until early 1970

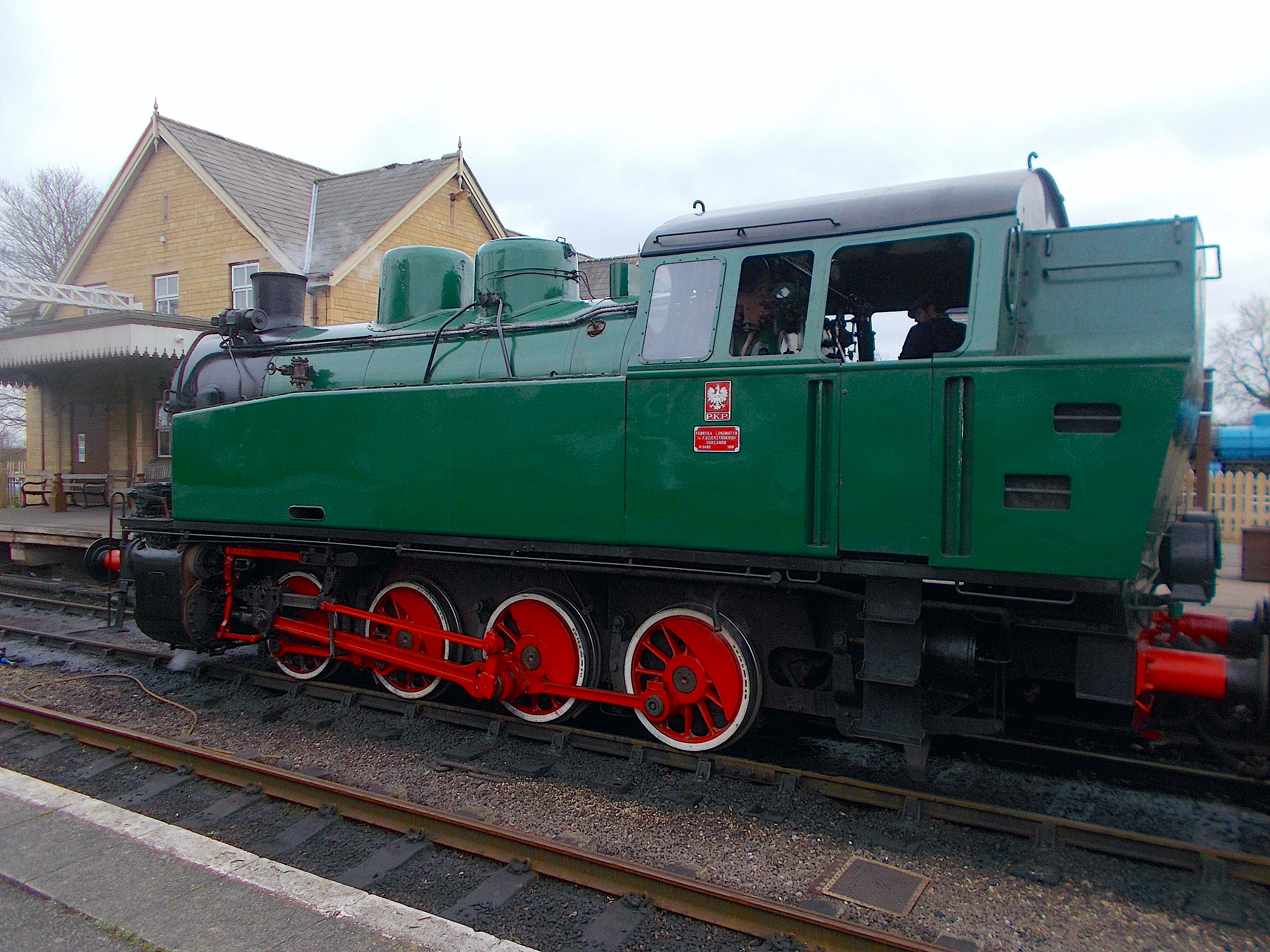
TKp Śląsk locomotive at Nene Valley Railway.

More successful steam locomotives were T2D Śląsk class tank engines. They were based on german Oberschlesien class shunting engines. In years 1950-1963, Fablok produced 390 units for various industrial facilities in Poland, China and Hungary. After 1994, when their service ended, many Śląsk class locomotives were scrapped. However, relatively large number of them survived in the various museums, both in Poland and abroad, for example: TKp5485 in Nene Valley Railway, TKP6041 (TKp5) in Silesian Railway Museum or TKp2011 in Chabówka.

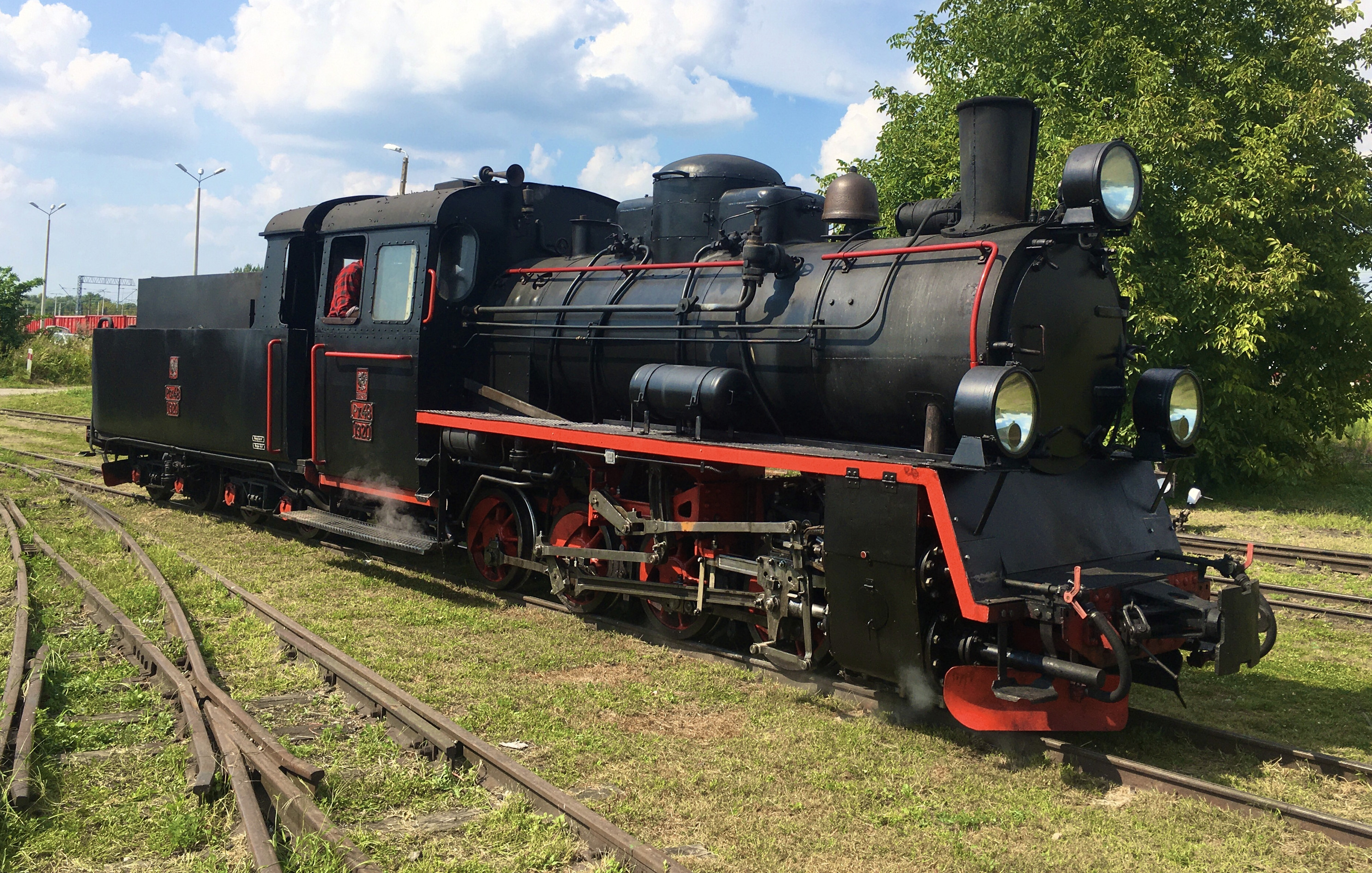
Px48-1920 in Przeworsk in 2023

0-8-0 arragment was more popular at narrow gauge railways. In the present times there are few locomotives preserved for historical purposes in relation to number of built. One of them is Px38-805 and Px27-775 in Wenecja Narrow Gauge Railway Museum in Żnin. There was more popular series of 0-8-0 narrow gauge locomotives. They were Px29 and Px48. Px29 was created in late 1920s in WSABP. 21 locomotions were made for PKP. Six locomotives survived; 4 of them are in Sweden and two in Sochaczew in Poland. Swedish Px29-1710 and polish Px29-1704 are still operational. Px48 were designed after WWII. They were based on PX29. Px48s were produced for domestic usage and foreign operators, for example Albania and China. Some of polish Px48 locomotives are still operational (Px48-1920 in Środa Wielkopolska and Px48-3901 in Koszalin) or during restoration (Px48-1734 in Przeworsk).

=== Russia ===
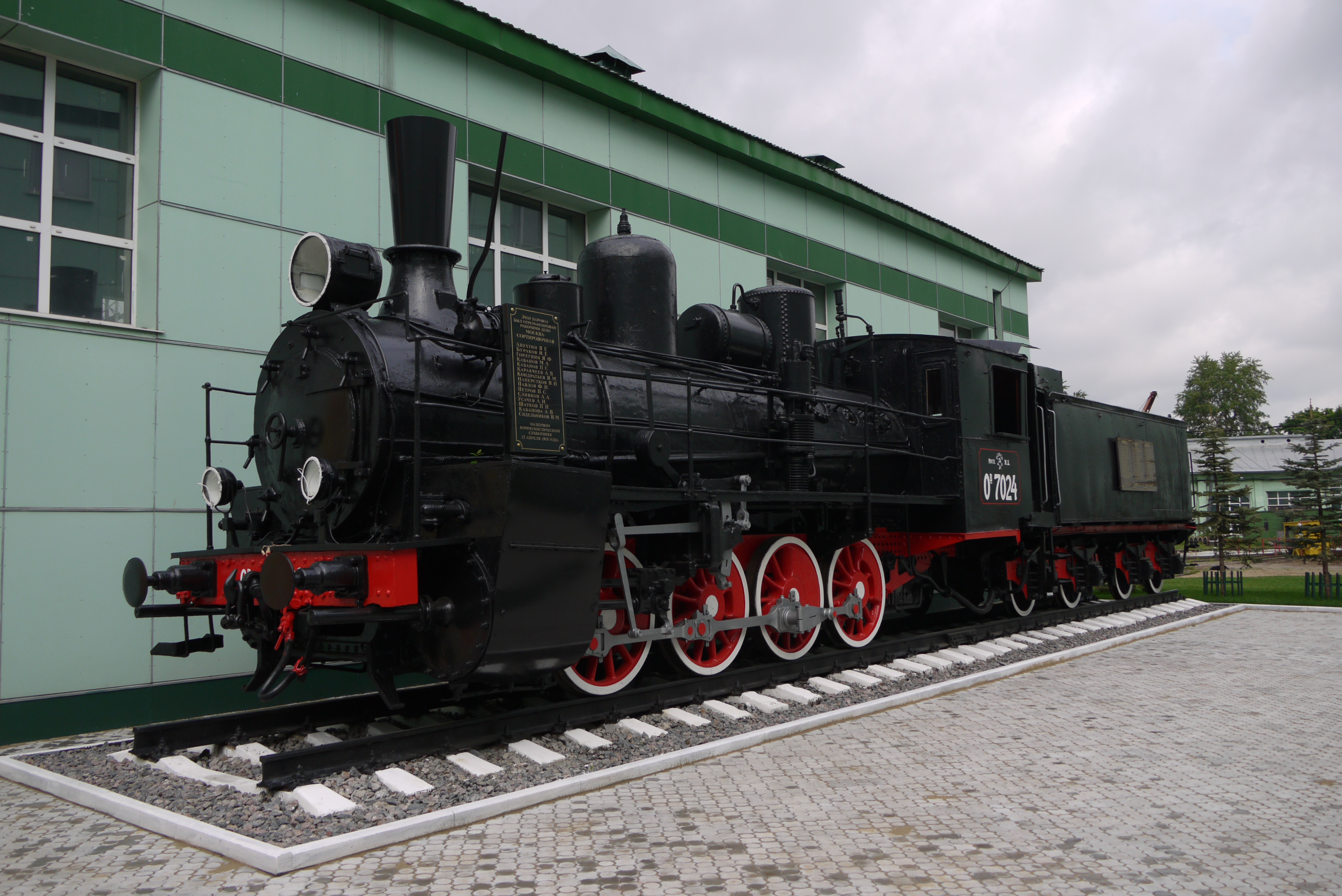
Russian class O 0-8-0 Ov 7024, Moskva-Ryazanskaya, Sortirovochnaya depot, Moscow

The first steam locomotives 0-8-0 in Russia — Е class have been produced since 1858. In Russia, the 0-8-0 type locomotives were represented by the various O-class (Osnovnoj-mainline) freight locomotives. They were built from the end of the 19th century until the 1920s. They were commonly called the Ovechka (Sheep) and were the most common freight locomotives in Tsarist Russia. Some are still preserved in working order.

One-thousand of the 750 mm (2 ft 5 1/2 in) gauge standard design, also known as class 159, were built between 1930 and 1941. They were poor performers, so the Kolomna works built an improved version of these locomotives, known as the P24 class. Nine were built before 1941.

=== South Africa ===
On the South African Railways (SAR), shunting was traditionally performed by downgraded mainline locomotives. When purpose-built 3 ft 6 in (1,067 mm) Cape gauge shunting locomotives were eventually introduced in 1929, the SAR preferred to adhere to the American practice of using tender locomotives for shunting, rather than the European practice of using tank locomotives. Three classes of 0-8-0 shunting steam locomotives were introduced between 1929 and 1952.

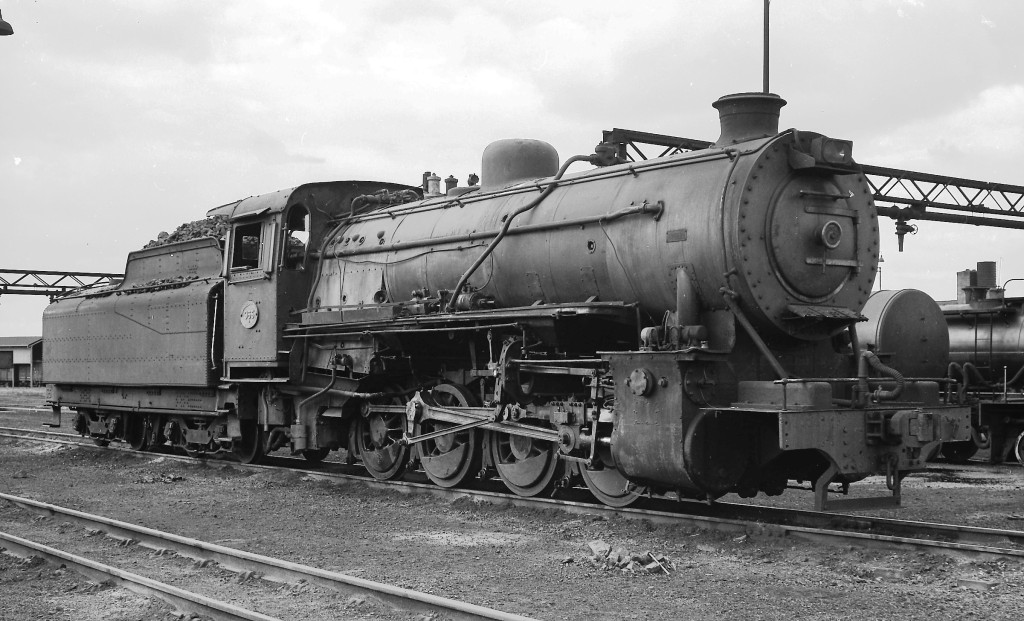
SAR Class S

In 1929, fourteen Class S locomotives were placed in service. They were built by Henschel & Son in Germany and designed to SAR specifications, with the top sides of the tender's coal bunker being set inwards and the water tank top rounded to improve the crew's rearward vision.

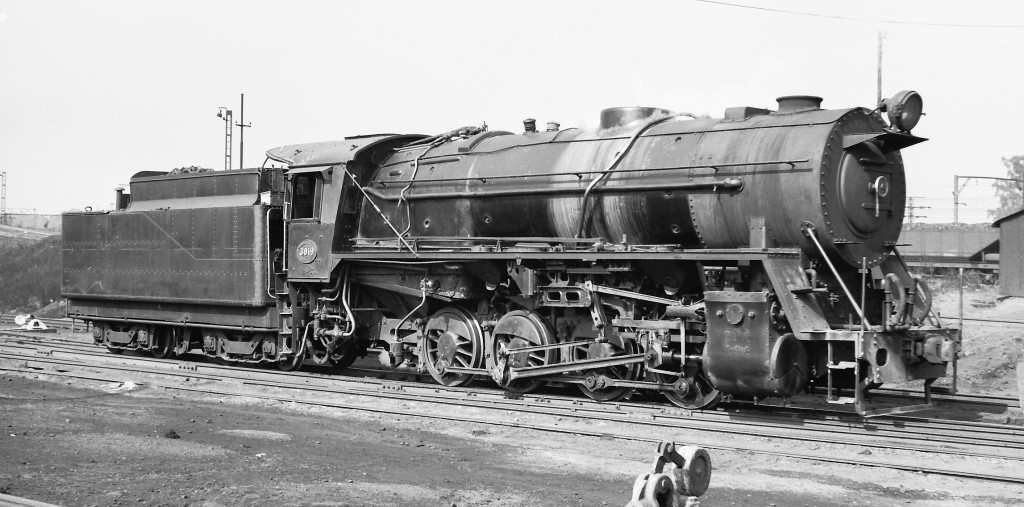
SAR Class S1

The second type, the Class S1, was designed by MM Loubser, chief mechanical engineer of the SAR from 1939 to 1949. Twelve of these locomotives, a heavier version of the Class S, were built at the Salt River workshops in Cape Town with the first being delivered in October 1947. A further 25 Class S1 locomotives were ordered from the North British Locomotive Company. Glasgow in 1952 and delivered in 1953 and 1954. The Class S1 was noted for its efficiency and economy and could cope with block loads of up to 2,000 long tons (2,032 tonnes).

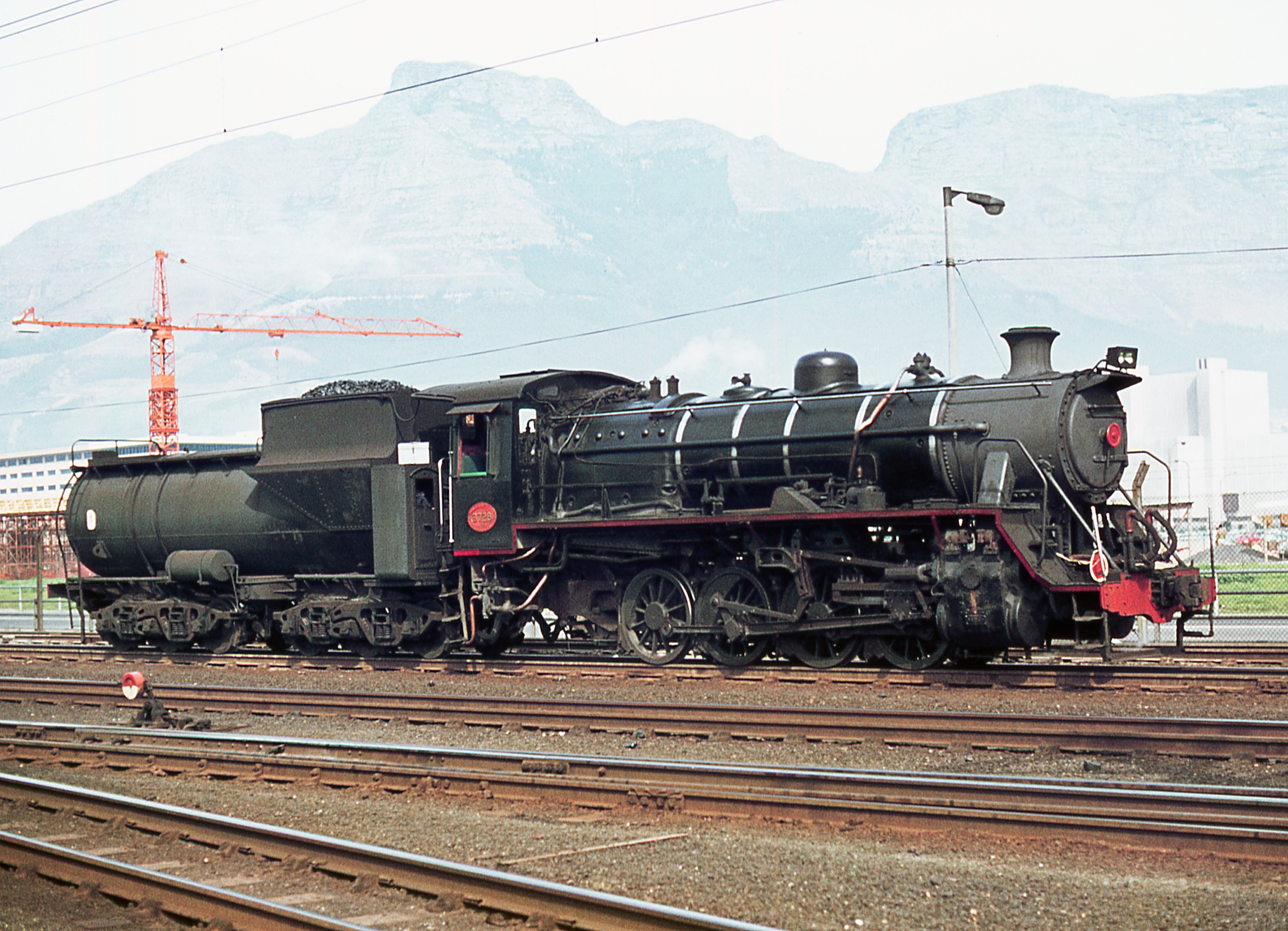
SAR Class S2

To meet the need for shunting locomotives with a light axle load for harbour work, these were followed in 1952 and 1953 by 100 Class S2 locomotives, built by Friedrich Krupp in Essen, Germany. To adhere to the specified weight limit, the Class S2 was built with a small boiler, with the result that it had the appearance of a Cape gauge locomotive with a narrow gauge boiler, particularly when viewed from the front. Also to reduce the axle load, it had Type MY1 tenders which rode on Buckeye three-axle bogies.

=== Sweden ===
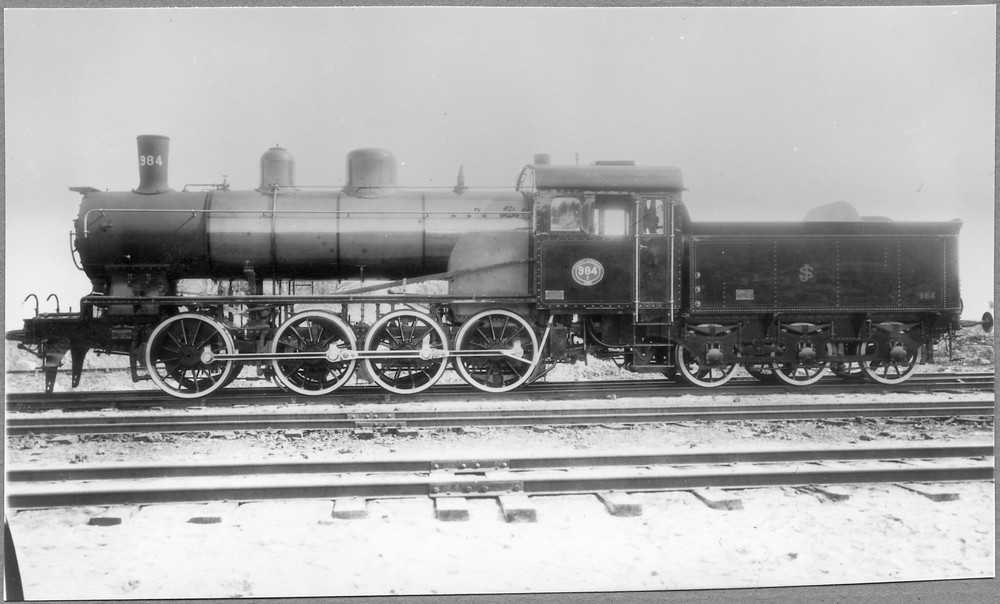
SJ E Class no. 1909

0-8-0 was wheel arrangement on some Swedish freight locomotives in the early 20th century. The most well known is probably the E class of steam locomotives as many of them survived in the strategic reserve until the 1990s, when all steam engines were removed from the strategic reserve. The E class of locomotives entered production in 1907 and many were modified to a 2-8-0 configuration with a name change to E2. The locomotives were intended as mixed locomotives in northern Sweden with its steeper inclines and for heavy freight in southern Sweden where the landscape is flatter.

Another locomotive was the Prussian G8.1 named the G class in Sweden which was ordered by the national railway company during WWI in 1916, but delivery was delayed until 1918.

=== United Kingdom ===
Two examples of 0-8-0T tank locomotives were built by Archibald Sturrock of the United Kingdom's Great Northern Railway in 1866, but the design was not perpetuated. A tender locomotive version was introduced on the Barry Railway Company in 1889 to haul coal trains.

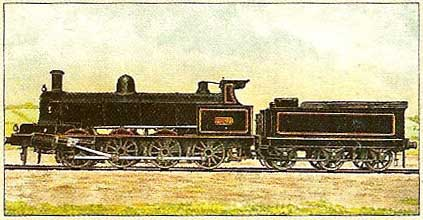
Webb Compound 0-8-0 of 1892

Francis Webb of the London and North Western Railway (LNWR) built 282 examples of a compound 0-8-0 locomotive between 1892 and 1904. A further 290 examples of a simple expansion version were built by his successor between 1910 and 1922.

In 1902, John Robinson of the Great Central Railway introduced his Class 8A tender engines, which were designated the Q4 class under the London and North Eastern Railway. From 1934, the class was replaced by the Robinson 2-8-0's and their withdrawal and scrapping began, but between 1942 and 1945 Edward Thompson converted thirteen into side-tanks, designated LNER Class Q1.

Under the grouping of 1923, the LNWR became part of the London, Midland and Scottish Railway (LMS). Henry Fowler designed an inside cylinder engine in 1929 to replace the LNWR examples, but they proved to be unsatisfactory and ended up having shorter lives than the LNWR locomotives.

In 1914, Manning Wardle of Leeds built a side-tank engine called Katharine for the Bridge Water Collieries system. On the Kent and East Sussex Railway, the Hecate was built for Colonel Stephens by Hawthorn and Leslie in 1904, but the branchline for which it was built was never completed and since the engine was too big for his other railways, it was exchanged in 1932 for a smaller engine from the Southern Railway. Hecate ended up as a motive power depot shunter at Nine Elms Locomotive Works and was scrapped in 1950.

On the Southern Railway, Richard Maunsell's Z class side-tank engines were first built in 1929 as a heavy shunting engine, 8 were built by 1930.

=== United States ===
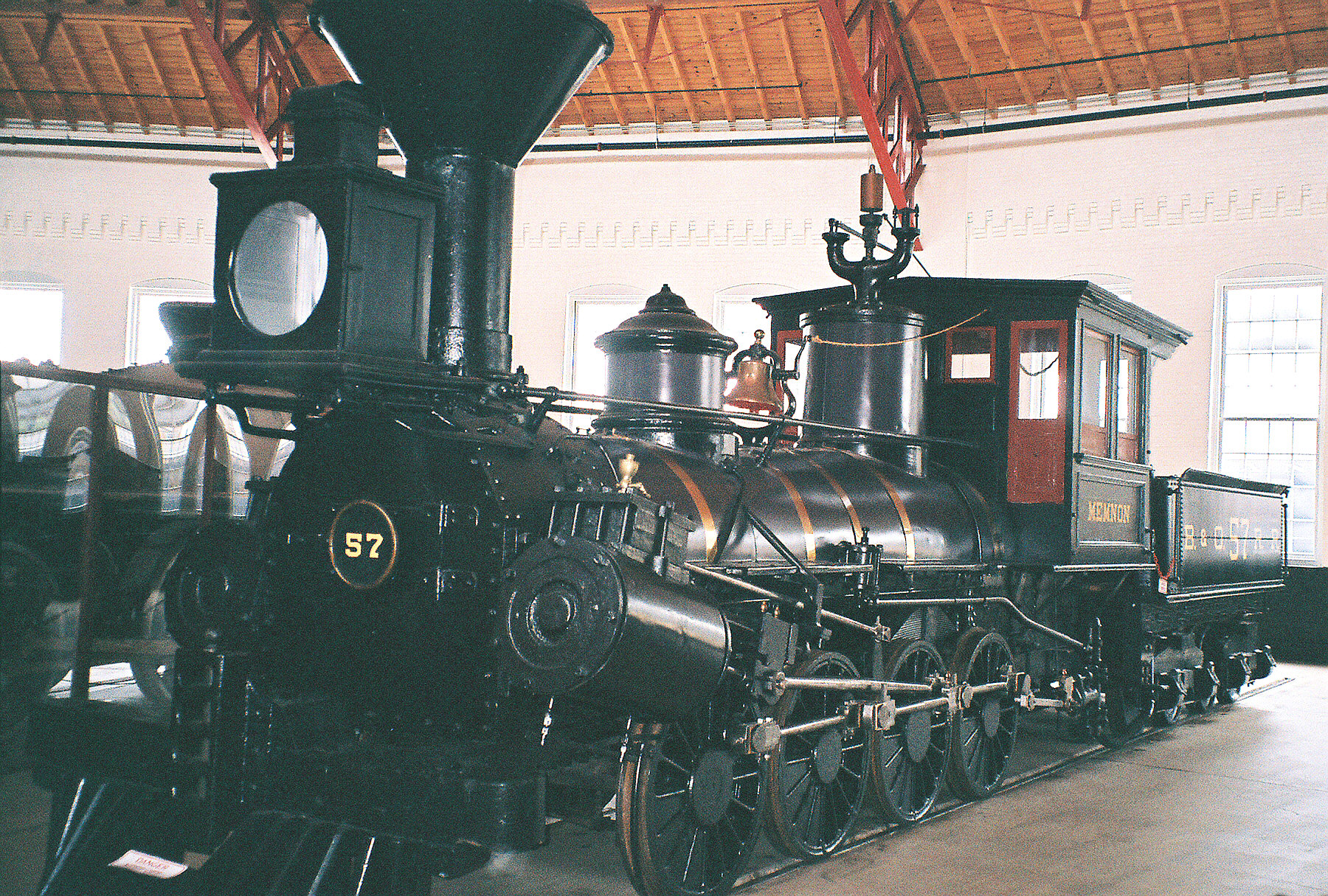
Baltimore and Ohio Railroad Memnon no. 57, an 0-8-0 locomotive built in 1848

The 0-8-0 wheel arrangement appeared early in locomotive development in the United States, during the mid-1840s. The configuration became popular and was more commonly constructed as a tender locomotive. It saw extensive use as a heavy switcher and freight engine.

Beginning in 1844, Ross Winans developed a series of 0-8-0 types for the Baltimore and Ohio Railroad (B&O), starting with a vertical-boiler design where the crankshaft was directly above and geared to the rear driving wheel. With a horizontal boiler, this became the Mud Digger class of engines on the B&O, of which twelve were built. In late 1847, the B&O moved to abandon geared drives and, in 1848, Baldwin delivered the first of a series of 0-8-0 freight engines.

The USRA 0-8-0 was a USRA standard class, designed by the United States Railroad Administration during World War I. This was the standard heavy switcher locomotive of the USRA types, of which 175 examples were built by ALCO, Baldwin and Lima for many different railroads in the United States. After the dissolution of the USRA in 1920, an additional 1,200 examples of the USRA 0-8-0 were built.

In the 1920s, the Pennsylvania Railroad wanted the best motive power possible to handle the switching chores at their yards and interchanges. Built in its own Juniata Shops, the Pennsylvania Railroad class C1, at 278,000 lb, was the heaviest two-cylinder 0-8-0 switcher ever produced. The calculated tractive effort was 76,154 lb.

The last steam locomotive to be built in the United States for a Class I railroad was 0-8-0 no. 244, a Class S1 switch engine erected by the Norfolk and Western's Roanoke Shops in December 1953. It was retired in March 1958.
