= South West African 2-8-0 =

Type of steam locomotive

GSWA Eight-Coupled Tender 2-8-0 South West African 2-8-0
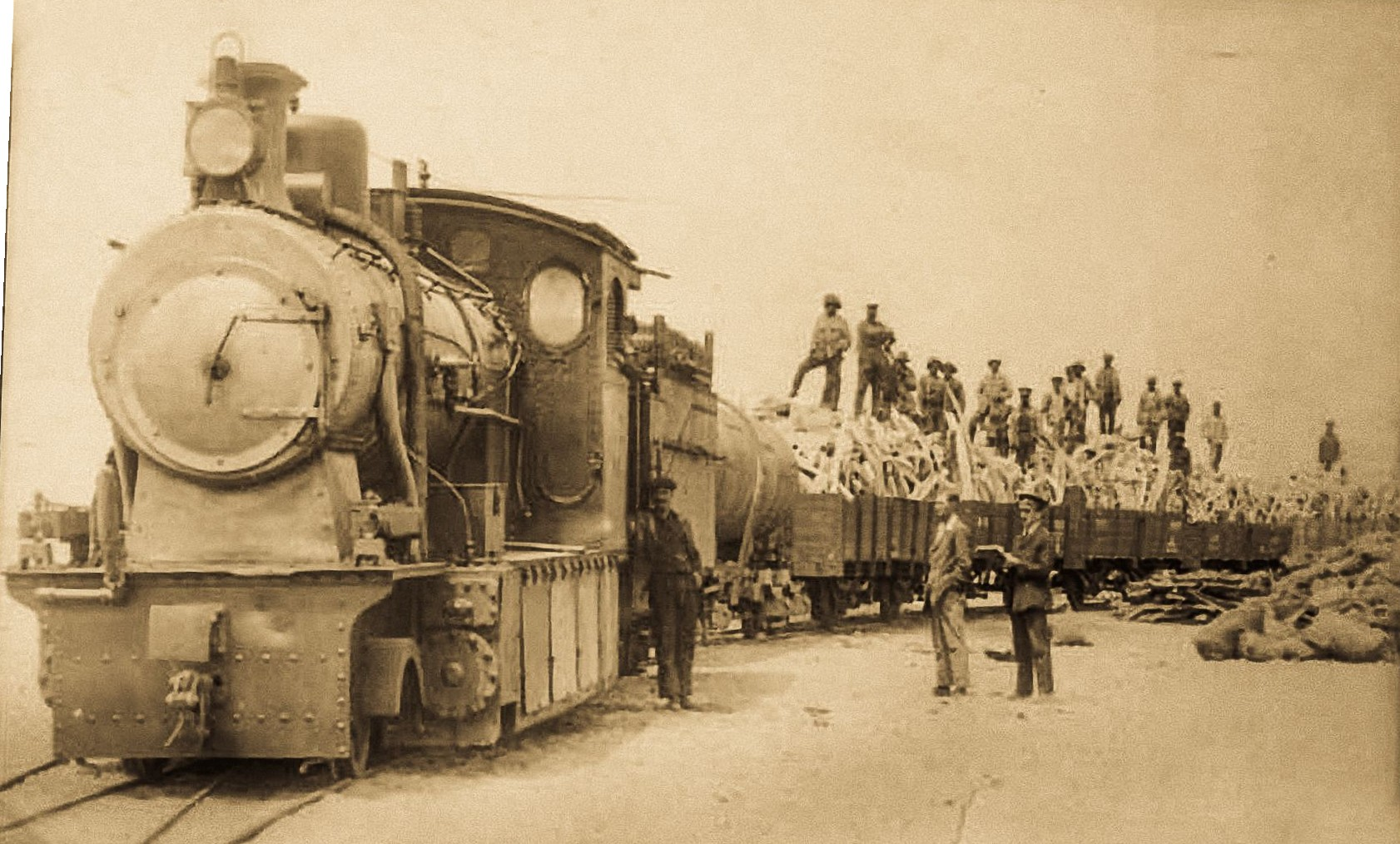
- Eight-coupled Tender with auxiliary water tank wagon on a trainload of whale bones, Walvisbaai, c. 1925
Type and origin
- Power type: Steam
- Designer: Orenstein & Koppel
- Builder: Orenstein & Koppel
- Serial number: 4614-4621
- Build date: 1911
- Total produced: 8
Specifications
- Configuration
  - Whyte: 2-8-0 (Consolidation)
  - UIC: 1'Dn2
- Driver: 3rd coupled axle
- Gauge: 3 ft 6 in (1,067 mm) Cape gauge
- Leading dia.: 27 9/16 in (700 mm)
- Coupled dia.: 39 3/8 in (1,000 mm)
- Tender wheels: 27 9/16 in (700 mm)
- Wheelbase: 40 ft 11 5/16 in (12,479 mm)
  - Engine: 24 ft 9 3/4 in (7,563 mm)
  - Coupled: 11 ft 9 3/4 in (3,600 mm)
  - Tender: 13 ft 5 7/16 in (4,101 mm)
  - Tender bogie: 4 ft 3 3/4 in (1,314 mm)
- Length
  - Over couplers: 50 ft 3/4 in (15,259 mm)
- Height: 12 ft 8 1/2 in (3,874 mm)
- Axle load: 7 LT 8 cwt (7,519 kg)
- Loco weight: 34 LT 10 cwt (35,050 kg)
- Tender weight: 31 LT 10 cwt (32,010 kg)
- Total weight: 66 LT (67,060 kg)
- Tender type: 2-axle bogies
- Fuel type: Coal
- Fuel capacity: 2 LT (2.0 t)
- Water cap.: 3,520 imp gal (16,000 L)
- Firebox
  - Type: Round-top
  - Grate area: 19.5 sq ft (1.81 m^{2})
- Boiler
  - Pitch: 7 ft 6 9/16 in (2,300 mm)
  - Small tubes: 180: 1 3/4 in (44 mm)
- Boiler pressure: 171 psi (1,179 kPa)
- Heating surface: 899 sq ft (83.5 m^{2})
- Cylinders: Two
- Cylinder size: 14 9/16 in (370 mm) bore 19 1/16 in (484 mm) stroke
- Valve gear: Heusinger
- Valve type: Murdoch's D slide
- Couplers: Buffer-and-chains
Performance figures
- Tractive effort: 13,580 lbf (60.4 kN) @ 75%
Career
- Operators: Lüderitzbucht Eisenbahn; South African Railways
- Number in class: 8
- Numbers: LE 151-158
- Delivered: 1911
- First run: 1911

The South West African 2-8-0 of 1911 was a steam locomotive from the German South West Africa era.

In 1911, eight tender locomotives with a 2-8-0 Consolidation type wheel arrangement were placed in service by the Lüderitzbucht Eisenbahn (Lüderitzbucht Railway) in German South West Africa. After the First World War, the territory came under South African administration and all eight locomotives came onto the roster of the South African Railways. They were not classified or renumbered and were simply referred to as the Eight-Coupled Tenders.

== Manufacturer ==
In 1911, eight Cape gauge tender locomotives with a 2-8-0 Consolidation type wheel arrangement were delivered to the Lüderitzbucht Eisenbahn in German South West Africa. They were built by Orenstein & Koppel between February and April 1911 and numbered in the range from 151 to 158.

== Characteristics ==
These locomotives had larger boilers than the Eight-Coupled Tank locomotives which had been delivered from the same manufacturer between 1907 and 1910, but their cylinders, frames and motion were interchangeable with those of the tank engines. As on the tank engines, the second pair of coupled wheels had a total sideplay of 13/32 inch (10 millimetres), while the trailing coupled wheels had a sideplay of 1 inch (25 millimetres). The locomotives were equipped with dust shields over the coupled wheels and valve gear to protect the moving parts from blown sand in the Namib desert.

The tender rode on two four-wheeled bogies. As built, it had a water capacity of 3,520 imperial gallons (16,000 litres) and a coal capacity of only 2 long tons (2.0 tonnes). Photographs show that the coal bunker sides of the tenders were raised by fitting a slatted open-top cage made of rectangular steel rods on top of the coal bunker to increase the coal capacity.

== Service ==
=== Lüderitzbucht Eisenbahn ===
The locomotives initially entered service on the Lüderitzbucht Eisenbahn or Südbahn, but they eventually mainly served on the Nord-Südbahn or North-South Railway between Windhoek and Keetmanshoop once that line was completed in 1912. As a result of the scarcity of water in the territory, they often ran with an auxiliary water tank wagon coupled behind their tenders.

=== South African Railways ===
On 1 April 1922, all railways in the former German colony came under the administration of the South African Railways (SAR). All eight locomotives had survived the First World War to be taken onto the SAR roster. They retained their German colonial era engine numbers and were not classified by the SAR, but were simply referred to as the Eight-Coupled Tenders.

The Eight-Coupled Tenders remained in SAR service in South West Africa into the late 1930s. One was photographed in service on a passenger train at Swakopmund as late as 7 October 1937.

== Illustration ==
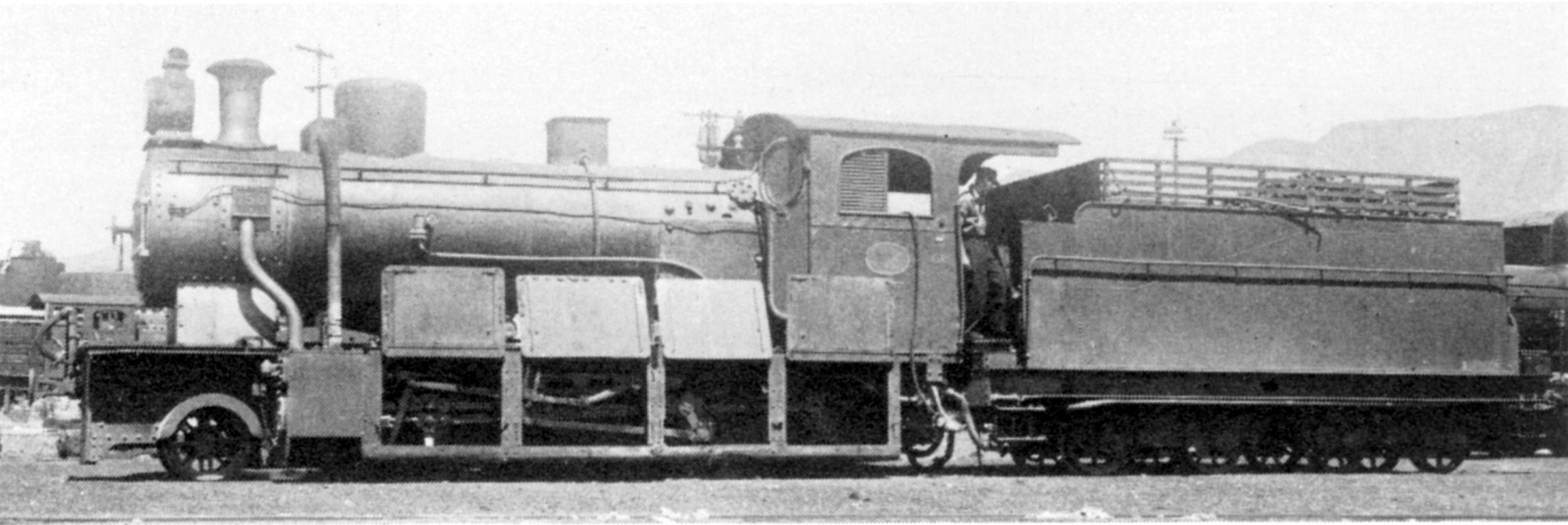
Side view of no. 156 with the dust panels opened

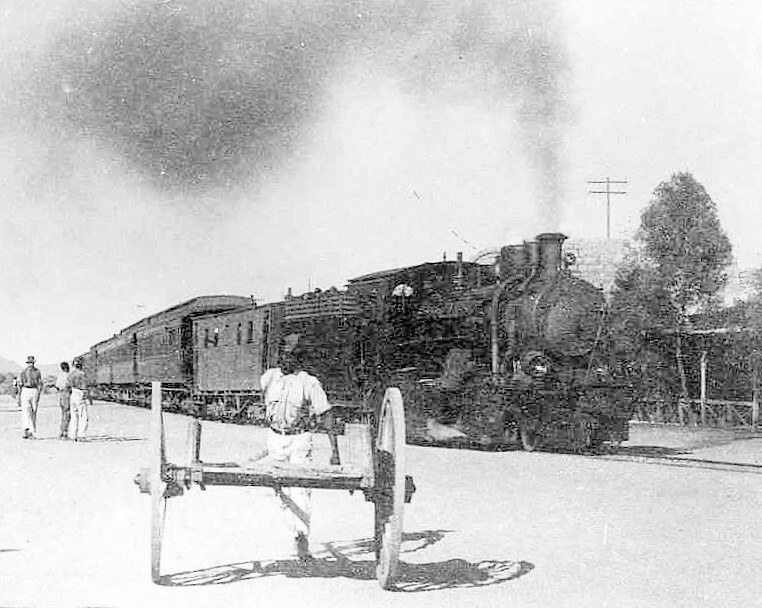
Eight-coupled tender locomotive, Karibib, c. 1925

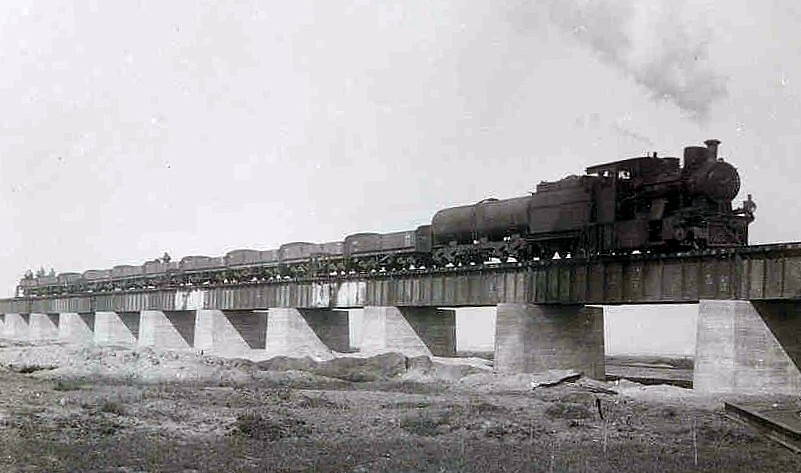
On the new bridge which was built after the Swakop Flood of 1931
