= FS Class 735 =

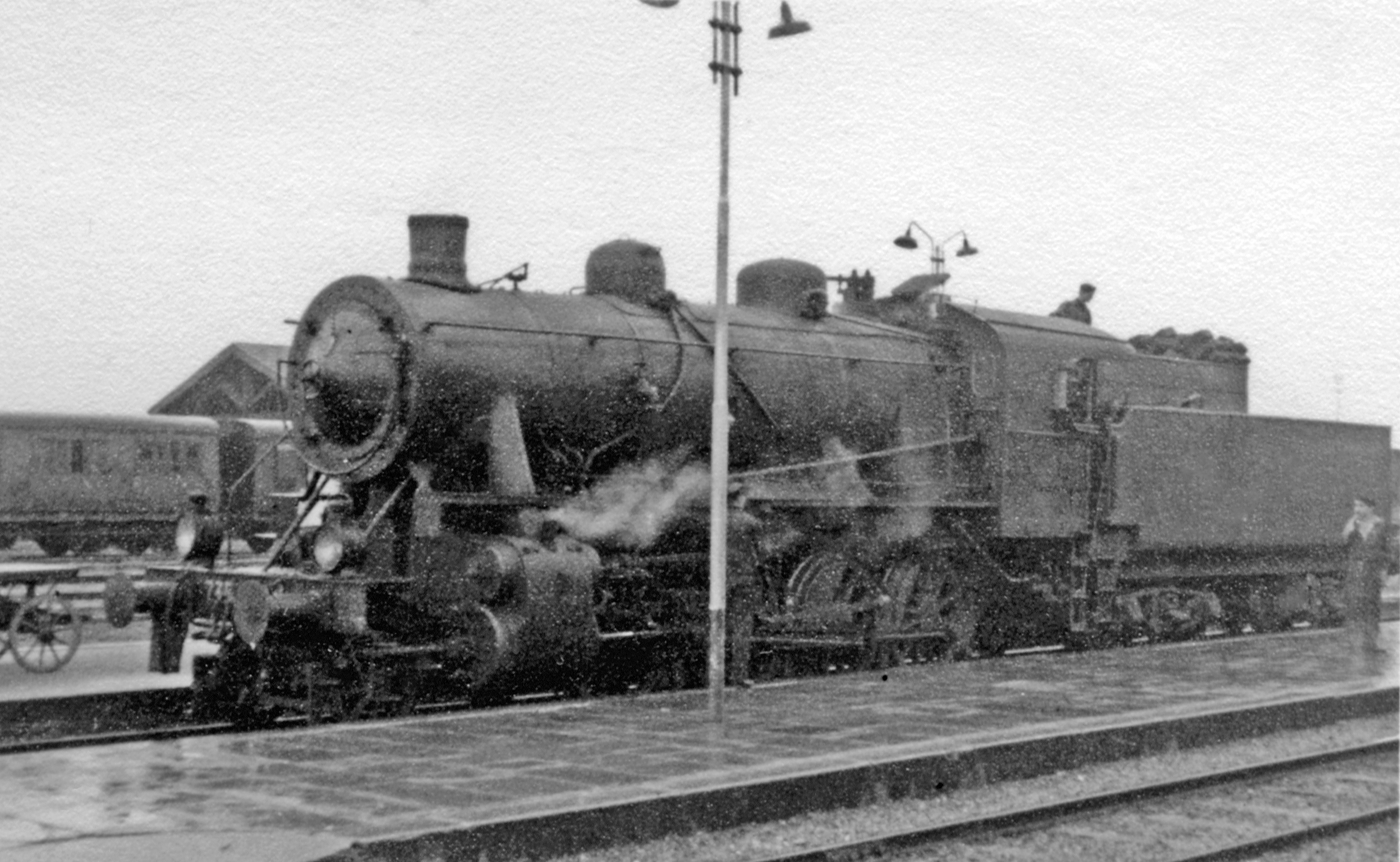
Type and origin
- Power type: Steam
- Builder: American Locomotive Company (100), Montreal Locomotive Works (300)
- Build date: 1917–1922
- Total produced: 400
Specifications
- Configuration
  - UIC: 1′D h2
- Gauge: 1,435 mm (4 ft 8 1/2 in) standard gauge
- Leading dia.: 840 mm (2 ft 9 1/8 in)
- Driver dia.: 1,370 mm (4 ft 5 7/8 in)
- Length: 10,595 mm (34 ft 9 1/8 in)
- Axle load: 14.8 tonnes (14.6 long tons; 16.3 short tons)
- Loco weight: 63.1 tonnes (62.1 long tons; 69.6 short tons)
- Tender weight: 50.2 tonnes (49.4 long tons; 55.3 short tons)
- Fuel type: Coal
- Fuel capacity: 6,000 kg (13,000 lb)
- Water cap.: 22,300 litres (4,900 imp gal; 5,900 US gal)
- Firebox
  - Grate area: 3.17 m^{2} (34.1 sq ft)
- Boiler pressure: 12 kg/cm^{2} (11.8 bar; 171 psi)
- Heating surface: 162.07 m^{2} (1,744.5 sq ft)
- Superheater
  - Heating area: 42.68 m^{2} (459.4 sq ft)
- Cylinders: 540 mm × 700 mm (21 1/4 in × 27 9/16 in), two
- Valve gear: Walschaerts
Performance figures
- Maximum speed: 65 km/h (40 mph)
- Power output: 1,080 CV (794 kW; 1,070 hp)
- Tractive effort: 14,700 kgf (144 kN; 32,400 lbf)
Career
- Operators: Ferrovie dello Stato
- Number in class: 393
- Numbers: 735.001 – 735.393

The Ferrovie dello Stato Italiane (FS; Italian State Railways) Class 735 (Italian: Gruppo 35) is a 2-8-0 'Consolidation' steam locomotive.

== Design and construction ==
The Class 735 was designed as a response of the situation developed during the years of World War I; the Italian railways needed more locomotives for freight trains, but there was no possibility of building them at home or in war-ravaged Europe. It was therefore decided to have them built overseas.

Using the Class 740 design as a pattern (but allowing for alterations in order to avoid delays in the production), an order for 100 locomotives was given to Alco in 1916, and the following year they were completed, disassembled and sent by cargo ship to Italy (with only 93 reaching Italy, however, as a U-boat sank the ship carrying the remaining seven). A subsequent order for another 300 locomotives, with some minor improvements in the boiler, was given in 1918 to the Montreal Locomotive Works.

Their American origin showed in their being fitted with a Bissel truck instead of the Italian bogie widespread in Italy, and with the locomotives of the first batch having fireboxes made of steel rather than copper.

== Operations ==
Nicknamed "Wilson" (in honour of US president Woodrow Wilson) throughout their career, the Class 735 locomotives proved very successful; they were considered by engineers to be somewhat more powerful than the 740 Class, although their consumes were accordingly higher. Pulling mainly freight trains but often also passenger trains, they operated until the 1960s, when mass withdrawals of the Class began, until the last one was retired in 1971.

== Preservation ==
Two Class 735 locomotives survived into preservation, 735.128, preserved as a static exhibit at the Pietrarsa railway museum, and 735.155, in possession of the Museo Ferroviario Piemontese, awaiting restoration.
