= 2-8-0 =

Locomotive wheel arrangement

2-8-0 (Consolidation)
- Front of locomotive at left

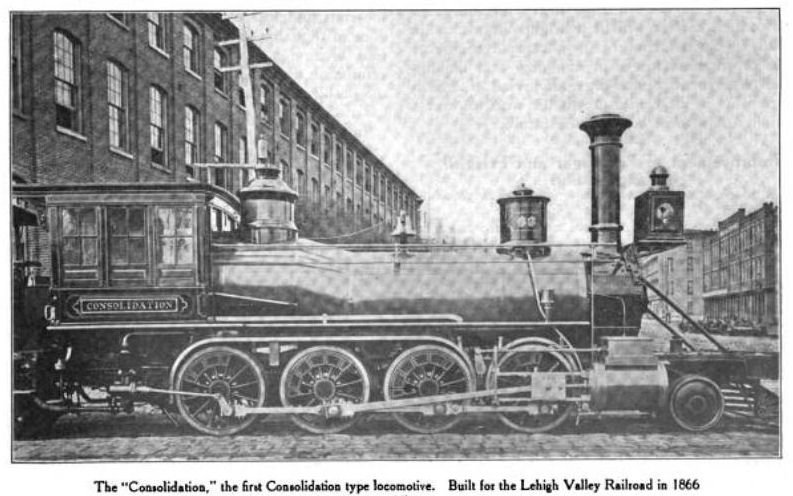
- Lehigh and Mahanoy Railroad's Consolidation of 1866, the first 2-8-0 built
Equivalent classifications
- UIC class: 1D, 1'D
- French class: 140
- Turkish class: 45
- Swiss class: 4/5
- Russian class: 1-4-0
First known tank engine version
- First use: 1907
- Country: German South West Africa
- Locomotive: South West African 2-8-0T
- Railway: Lüderitzbucht Eisenbahn
- Designer: Orenstein & Koppel
- Builder: Orenstein & Koppel
First known tender engine version
- First use: c. 1864
- Country: United States of America
- Railway: Pennsylvania Railroad
- Designer: John P. Laird
- Builder: John P. Laird
- Evolved from: 0-8-0
- Evolved to: 2-8-2
- Benefits: Better stability through curves
- Drawbacks: Poor steaming and limited speed.
First known "True type" version
- First use: 1866
- Country: United States of America
- Locomotive: Consolidation
- Railway: Lehigh and Mahanoy Railroad
- Designer: Alexander Mitchell
- Builder: Baldwin Locomotive Works
- Evolved from: 0-8-0
- Evolved to: 2-8-2

Under the Whyte notation for the classification of steam locomotives, 2-8-0 represents the wheel arrangement of two leading wheels on one axle, usually in a leading truck, eight powered and coupled driving wheels on four axles, and no trailing wheels. In the United States and elsewhere, this wheel arrangement is commonly known as a Consolidation, after the Lehigh and Mahanoy Railroad’s Consolidation, the name of the first 2-8-0.

The notation 2-8-0T indicates a tank locomotive of this wheel arrangement, the "T" suffix indicating a locomotive on which the water is carried in side-tanks mounted on the engine rather than in an attached tender.

The Consolidation represented a notable advance in locomotive power. After 1875, it became "the most popular type of freight locomotive in the United States and was built in greater quantities than any other single wheel arrangement."

== Overview ==
Of all the locomotive types that were created and experimented with in the 19th century, the 2-8-0 was a relative latecomer.

The first locomotive of this wheel arrangement was possibly built by the Pennsylvania Railroad (PRR). Like the first 2-6-0s, this first 2-8-0 had a leading axle that was rigidly attached to the locomotive's frame, rather than on a separate truck or bogie. To create this 2-8-0, PRR master mechanic John P. Laird modified an existing 0-8-0, the Bedford, in 1863.

The 2-6-0 Mogul type, first created in the early 1860s, is often considered as the logical forerunner to the 2-8-0. However, a claim is made that the first true 2-8-0 engine evolved from the 0-8-0 and was ordered by the United States' Lehigh and Mahanoy Railroad, which named all its engines. The name given to the new locomotive was Consolidation, the name that was later almost globally adopted for the type. According to this viewpoint, the first 2-8-0 order by Lehigh dates to 1866 and antedates the adoption of the type by other railways and coal and mountain freight haulers.

From its introduction in 1866 and well into the early 20th century, the 2-8-0 design was considered to be the ultimate heavy-freight locomotive. The 2-8-0's forte was starting and moving "impressive loads at unimpressive speeds" and its versatility gave the type its longevity. The practical limit of the design was reached in 1915, when it was realised that no further development was possible with a locomotive of this wheel arrangement.

== Usage ==
As in the United States, the 2-8-0 was also a popular type in Europe, again largely as a freight hauler. The type was also used in Australia, New Zealand, and Southern Africa.

=== Australia ===
The 2-8-0 locomotive was used extensively throughout Australia. It served on the 5 ft 3 in (1,600 mm) broad gauge, 4 ft 8 1/2 in (1,435 mm) standard gauge and 3 ft 6 in (1,067 mm) narrow gauge and was employed mostly as a freight locomotive, although it was often also employed in passenger service in Victoria.

The first Australian locomotive class with this wheel arrangement were the Queensland Railways C13 and C15, built as goods locomotives in 1879 by Baldwin Locomotive Works. Another lot of Consolidation engines consisted of 20 standard-gauge New South Wales Government Railways (NSWGR) J Class engines, which arrived from Baldwin Locomotive Works in 1891. The Js remained in service until 1915, when they were withdrawn. Wartime shortages between 1916 and 1920 had six engines re-entering service after being shopped and fitted with superheaters. The last engine of this class was finally withdrawn in 1934 and all were scrapped by 1937.

The next batch of NSW 2-8-0 locomotives to appear, between 1896 and 1916, was the T class engines. The class was delivered from one local and several overseas builders, 151 locomotives from Beyer, Peacock & Company, 84 from North British Locomotive Company, 10 from Neilson & Company, 30 from Clyde Engineering in Australia, and five from Dübs & Company. During World War II, 14 of these locomotives were equipped with superheaters, which raised their tractive effort from 28,777 lbf (128.0 kN) to 33,557 lbf (149.3 kN).

From 1899, the Victorian Railways (VR) also used a range of broad-gauge 2-8-0 locomotives.

- The first of these locomotives were the Baldwin-built V class. These engines were built at Phoenix Foundry in Ballarat. By 1930, they had disappeared from the VR.
- The VR's next type was the 26 C class engines, which saw freight and passenger service.
- In 1922, a smaller and lighter 2-8-0, the K class, was introduced for branchline freight and later also passenger services.

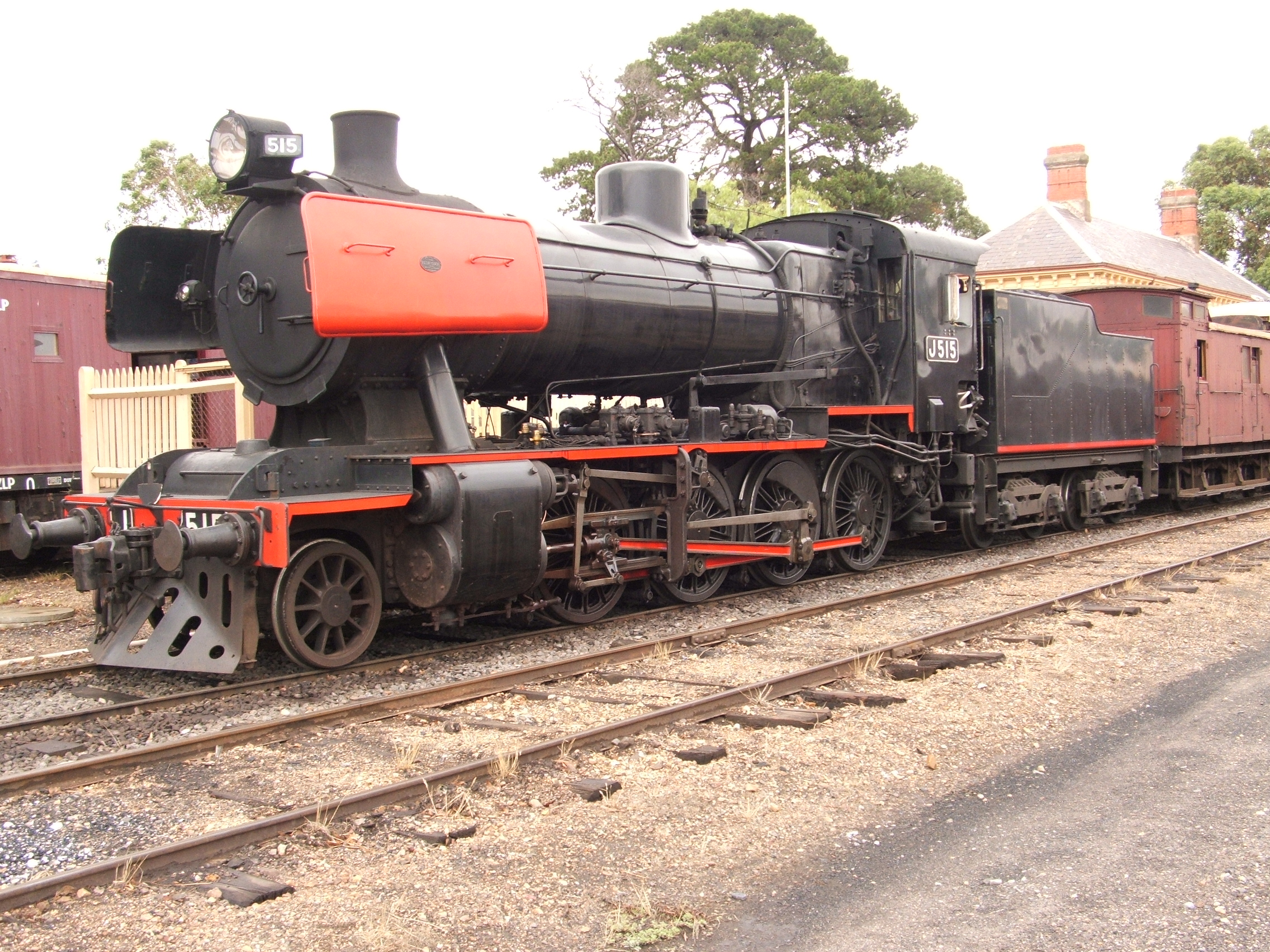
Victorian Railways J class No. J 515

- Finally, the VR introduced sixty light 2-8-0 J class engines in 1954. These also worked both freight and passenger services.

The first 2-8-0 engines in private service on the Midland Railway of Western Australia arrived in 1912. These were 3 ft 6 in (1,067 mm) gauge locomotives. The five in the class operated until 1958. All were gone by 1963.

In 1912, some of the NSWGR T class types were also purchased by the private East Greta Railway, later to become the South Maitland Railway, but these were converted to 2-8-2 tank locomotives. The class proved to be successful throughout its long service life, until being retired from government revenue service in 1973.

During 1916, Commonwealth Railways acquired eight K class for the Trans-Australian Railway.

In 1924, a private coal company, J & A Brown in NSW, obtained three ex-British military Railway Operating Division ROD 2-8-0 locomotives. Brown later ordered another 10 of these locomotives, but only nine of that order arrived in Australia. The last was withdrawn in 1973.

=== Belgium ===
To compensate for wartime losses, Belgian railways acquired 300 2-8-0 locomotives in 1946. They were built in North America, 160 by Montreal Locomotive Works in Canada, 60 by the Canadian Locomotive Company, and 80 by the American Locomotive Company in the United States. These machines proved to be very reliable and were used for mixed traffic until the end of the steam era, when number 29.013 hauled the last scheduled steam passenger train from Ath to Denderleeuw on 20 December 1966.

This locomotive survived in preservation and is used on special excursions. On 16 December 2006, number 29.013 re-enacted the last 1966 run on the same route.

=== Canada ===
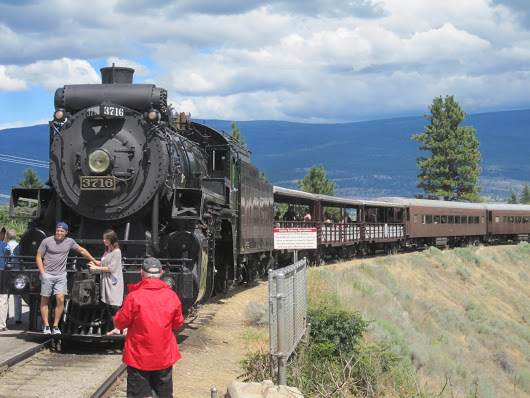
CP N-2-c no. 3716 at Canyon View

The Canadian Pacific Railway (CP) N-2-a, b, and c class locomotives were a class of altogether 182 Consolidation type locomotives, built by Montreal Locomotive Works between 1912 and 1914. They were numbered in the range from 3600 to 3799 and were used almost everywhere around the system. The order for these engines came about when CP needed bigger locomotives for their mainline since their current engines were wearing out and were too small for the loads that were being hauled. Most of the class were converted to oil-firing in later years.

One of the locomotives, No. 3716, is run and maintained in Summerland, BC as part of the Kettle Valley Steam Railway.

=== Finland ===
Finland had five tender locomotive classes with a 2-8-0 wheel arrangement, the classes Tk1, Tk2, Tk3, Tv1, and Tv2. The class Tk1s were numbered from 271 to 290 and were nicknamed Amerikan Satikka.

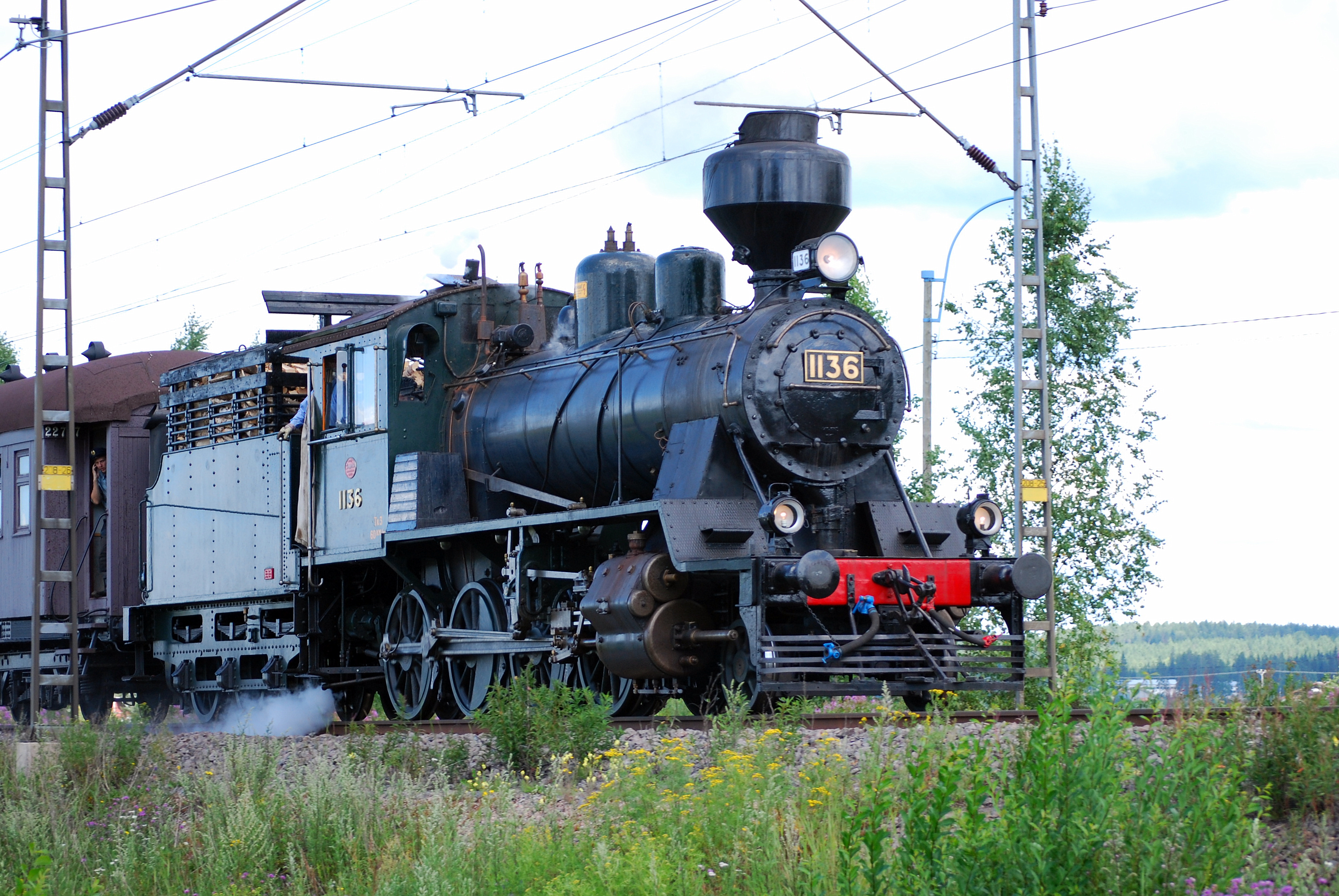
Class Tk3 No. 1136 in special service from Kouvola to Kotka

The class Tk2s were numbered 407 to 426 and 457 to 470. They were nicknamed Satikka. Three were preserved, No. 407 at Närpes, No. 418 at Junction City, Oregon, in the United States, and No. 419 at Haapamäki. The class Tk3s were numbered 800 to 899, 1100 to 1118, and 1129 to 1170. They were built by Tampella, Lokomo, and Frichs. The class Tv1s were numbered 594 to 617, 685 to 741, 900 to 948, and 1200 to 1211. They were built by Tampella and were nicknamed Jumbo. Four were preserved, No. 609 at Haapamäki, No. 933 at the Veturi museum at Toijala, No. 940 at Lapinlahti and No. 943 at Ylivieska. The class Tv2s were numbered from 618 to 637. They were nicknamed Wilson. Only No. 618 was preserved, also at Haapamäki.

Finland had only one tank locomotive class with a 2-8-0 wheel arrangement, the class M1 consisting of one solitary locomotive numbered 66. It was not preserved.

=== Germany ===
The 2-8-0 wheel arrangement enjoyed a brief period of popularity in Germany during the era of the Länderbahnen or State Railways, from about 1840 to 1920, prior to the establishment after the First World War of the Deutsche Reichsbahn, the German National Railways. Under the Deutsche Reichsbahn-Gesellschaft (DRG) classification system, all 2-8-0 locomotives were assigned to class 56 (Baureihe or BR 56), with different types receiving subclassifications. The earliest type was the Prussian G7^{3} of 1893.

=== Indonesia ===
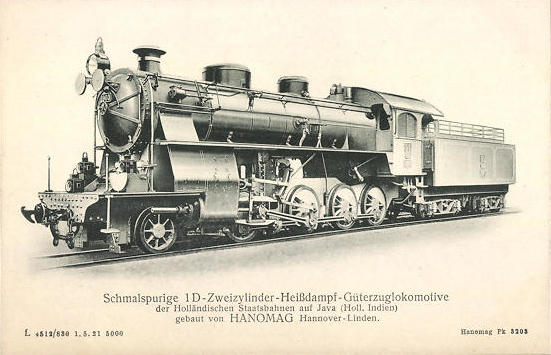
SS Class 900 or DKA D50

In response to the increasing need for freight and passenger transports on the Buitenzorg–Bandung–Banjar line, the Java Staatsspoorwegen at the time ordered 42 Consolidation locomotives from 4 different engine manufacturers, including Swiss Locomotive and Machine Works (SLM), Hanomag, Hartmann and Werkspoor, came in 1914, 1915 and 1921, classified as SS Class 900 (901–942). These locomotives were made to fulfill the requirements that submitted by SS, being able to haul 550 tons of freight with speeds of up to 50 km/h (31 mph) or 30 km/h (18.6 mph) on lines with a gradient of 4% or 1 in 25. In order to be able to negotiate 150 meters curve radius, the leading wheels adopted Adam axle system which could enable to turn radially by 70 mm. As for the fourth driving wheels, adopted Golsdorf axle system (patented by Karl Golsdorf), this make the outer driving wheels able to move laterally by 100 mm. As by result, it's not only able to turn at 150 meters curve radius, but speeds up to 75 km/h (46.6 mph) was made possible from its initial of 50 km/h (31 mph). Based on record in 1938, the SS Class 900/DKA 50s ever been used to haul the Eendaagsche Express or One Day Express train on Bandung–Banjar southern-west line replacing the 2-8-8-0 SS Class 1250 (DKA DD52) due to resource and asset saving policies during Great Depression and 2-6-2T SS Class 1700/DKA C30s which were considered to be inefficient in serving the increasingly congested volume of freights and passenger transport. In 1939, the Eendaagsche Express shortened the time journey for Bandung–Yogyakarta–Surabaya to only 11 hours. These locomotives worked on Bandung–Purwakarta–Batavia line and also assigned to work the eastern express trains in East Java on Banyuwangi–Surabaya line in tandem with 4-6-4T SS Class 1100 (DKA C27). To make the SS 900s have the characteristics of express locomotive, each unit received the modification of two pair of smoke deflectors. In the need of increasing freight transport in South Sumatra, the Java Staatsspoorwegen allocated 4 of them to serve coal transport from Bukit Asam to Kertapati. Not quite a long, the South Sumatra division of SS or so called Zuid-Sumatra Staatsspoorwegen (ZSS) were also ordered 11 of these from two German engine manufacturers, 5 were imported from Hartmann in 1925 and the rest of 6 from Hanomag in 1926.

==== Preservation ====
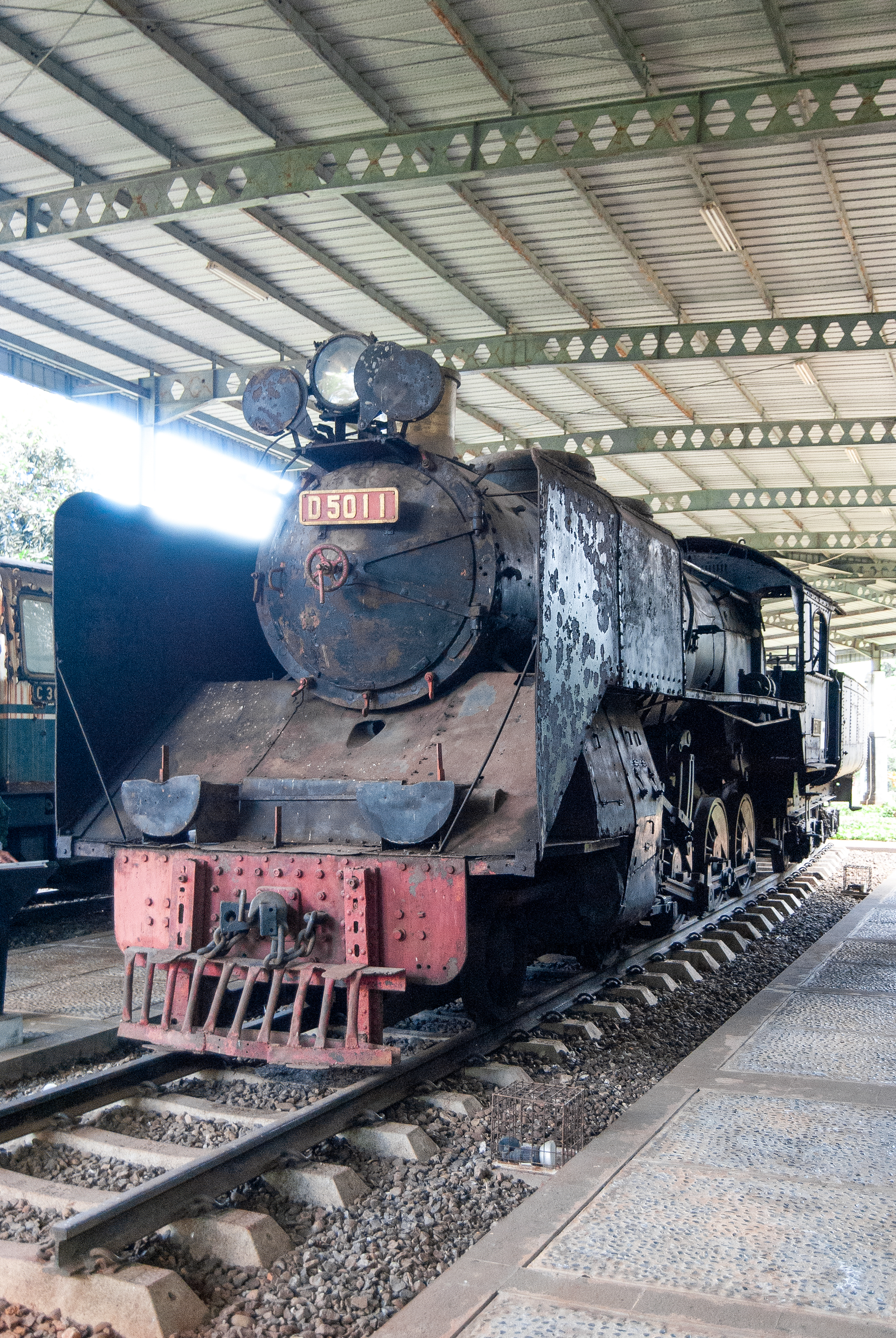
SS 911 or DKA D5011 at the Transportation Museum of Taman Mini Indonesia Indah

During Japanese occupation in 1942, all Dutch East Indies railway locomotives were renumbered based on Japanese numberings, this including the SS Class 900s were renumbered to D50s and this numbering system still used after the Independence of Indonesia by Djawatan Kereta Api (DKA) or Department of Railways of the Republic of Indonesia up to now. During Indonesian National Revolution some of SS Class 900/DKA D50 were used among the others to haul trains belonging to Republican fighters and the Dutch military. In some records, some of them were destroyed in action due to the conflict. While the SS911 or DKA D50 11 was captured by 2nd Company of 1e Bataljon, 15 Regiment Infanterie of Dutch Marines during Operation Kraai in Yogyakarta. After the acknowledgement of Indonesian sovereignty by Dutch in 1949, the SS Class 900 were transferred to Djawatan Kereta Api. In 1976, most of D50s were found regularly in Jember, East Java which many of them had been dumped out and seemed to be derelict. While the rest of them are still used regularly in South Sumatra pulling some coal trains. Out of 61 units, only DKA D50 11 (ex-SS911) survived and now preserved as static display in Transportation Museum of Taman Mini Indonesia Indah.

=== Italy ===
In Italy, the state-controlled railways company Ferrovie dello Stato (FS), after comparing two models of 2-8-0 engine in 1906 (a simple-expansion [simplex] locomotive purchased from Baldwin and a compound type assembled by German and Italian builders) opted for a simplex 2-8-0 as basic power for its freight and mixed trains. Production of such locomotives, classified Gr. 740 in Italy, began in 1911 and stopped four years later when Italy entered the First World War.

Thereafter, Italian industry was devoted to producing military equipment, so FS bought locomotives from North American firms. From 1917 to 1922, American Locomotive Company and Montreal Locomotive Works built 400 2-8-0 locomotives for Italy but only 393 were delivered. The FS classified these engines as Gr. 735 and used them for freight and passenger services. After the war, the supply of Italian-built Gr. 740 resumed. Both Gr. 740 and Gr 735, very similar in performance, remained in service until the end of the 1960s.

=== Japan ===
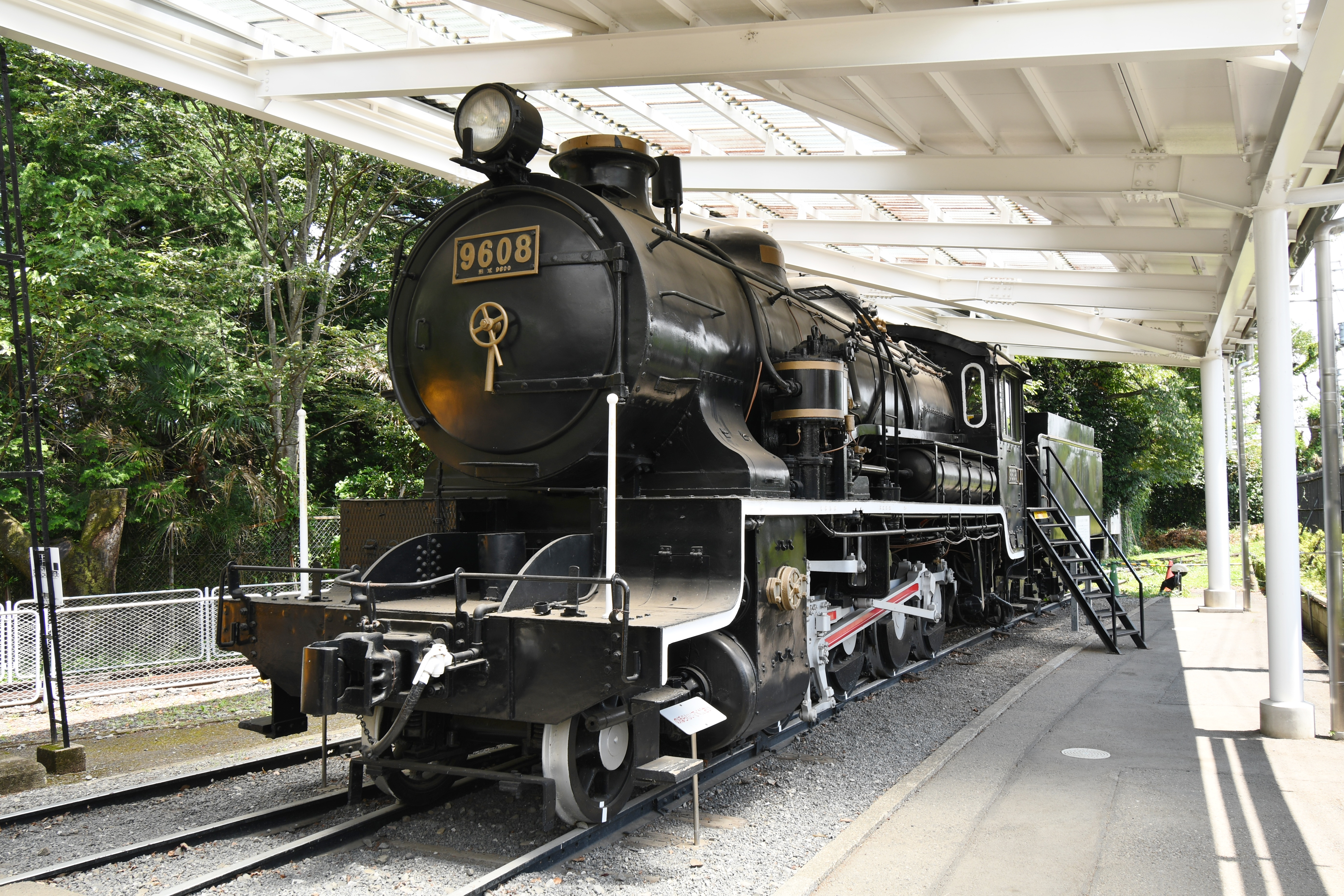
JNR Class 9600 No. 9608, oldest surviving example of the class, on static display at Ome Railway Park.

The Baldwin supplied the first three 2-8-0 9000 class locomotives for export to Japan in 1893, in use of Hokkaido Colliery and Railway Company, which were taken over Japanese Government Railway under Railway Nationalization Act of 1906.

Among several classes, most successful examples were 770 of JNR Class 9600, built from 1913 to 1926. Some independent shortlines had equivalent locomotives to 9600 both factory-new and secondhand from JNR, the last example was Yubari Colliery and Railway No. 21, built in 1941 by Kawasaki. Despite obsolescence and early replacement by 2-8-2 D51, 9600s were still widely utilized thanks to high performance and appropriate route availability. The last example, No. 79602, kept longevity until March 1976, making the very final steam traction in service on JNR. No. 79602 was nearly preserved, however, sadly, it was subsequently destroyed by arson attack at Oiwake roundhouse.

=== New Zealand ===
Several 2-8-0 locomotives were supplied to New Zealand by the Baldwin Locomotive Works of Philadelphia in the United States. Six O Class locomotives were built for the New Zealand Railways in 1885.

The Wellington and Manawatu Railway Company, which operated the Wellington-Manawatu line, had four similar locomotives built by Baldwin, two in 1888, one in 1894 and one in 1896. The WMR locomotives of 1894 and 1896, No. 12 and No. 13, were Vauclain compound locomotives, the first in New Zealand and the first narrow-gauge compounds in the world. While standard gauge compounds usually had the low-pressure cylinder mounted below the high-pressure cylinder on each side, this was often reversed on narrow-gauge locomotives, which had the larger low-pressure cylinders mounted above the high-pressure cylinders to provide greater clearance at platforms.

In 1908, when the WMR was nationalized, these locomotives were classified into three NZR subclasses because of detail differences, the two 1888 locomotives as O^{B} class, the 1894 locomotive as O^{A} class, and the 1896 locomotive as O^{C} class.

=== North Korea ===
The Korean State Railway have locally built 500-series (used by rubber recycling plant) and 810 series Japanese built narrow gauge (762mm) 2-8-0 locomotives. The 810 series was likely retired in 2006 and 500-series may still be operating.

=== Poland ===
"Consolidated" 2-8-0 locomotives were relatively popular at Polish State Railways (PKP) after 1918. However, most of them were not original polish designs. After World War I newly created polish state took and introduced small amounts of 2-8-0 locomotives from Russia (Tr103), Germany (Tr1) and Austria-Hungary (Tr11 and Tr12). Due to their wheel arrangement, they have been classified as "r" engines. First large order for new locomotives for PKP was made in United States in 1919. They were built in Baldwin Locomotive Works and classified in Poland as Tr20. They were used from 1920 to 1974. After World War II Poland acquired even more 2-8-0 engines, usually made in Germany in the interwar period, such as a Tr5 (former DRG Class 56.2), Tr6 (former Prussian G 8.2) and Tr7. More 2-8-0s came to Poland from United Kingdom and USA. In years 1946 - 1976, PKP had 30 Liberation Class locomotives, classified as Tr202. Another very popular steam engine was USATC S160. First 75 units came to Poland in the years 1946 - 1947 as part of the UNRRA program. They were classified as Tr201 from 1 to 75. In the late 1940s Poland received 500 more S160 locomotives, later depicted as Tr203. Last Tr201 and Tr203 were withdrawn in the early 1980s. From almost 600 units only 3 remained in Poland: Tr203-451 in Warsaw, Tr201-51 and Tr203-296 in Jaworzyna Śląska.

The first 2-8-0 locomotives built in independent Poland were PKP class Tr12. They were austrian KkStB 270. After 1918 PKP received 142 locomotives; 60 of them were built in early 1920s by WSABP in Warsaw. Rest of those locomotives were delivered by Lokomotivfabrik Floridsdorf. They were operational until year 1969.

First locomotive designed in Poland was Tr21. New steam engines for PKP were created in cooperation with Austrian StEG. Between 1922 and 1925 PKP received 148 units of Tr21. There were 3 different producers: Austrian StEG, polish Fablok and Belgian John Cockerill. First locomotive fully built in Poland was Tr21-37 put into service in February 1924. After World War II PKP had 100 units in service. Usage of those locomotions ended in 1974. Only one locomotive was preserved.

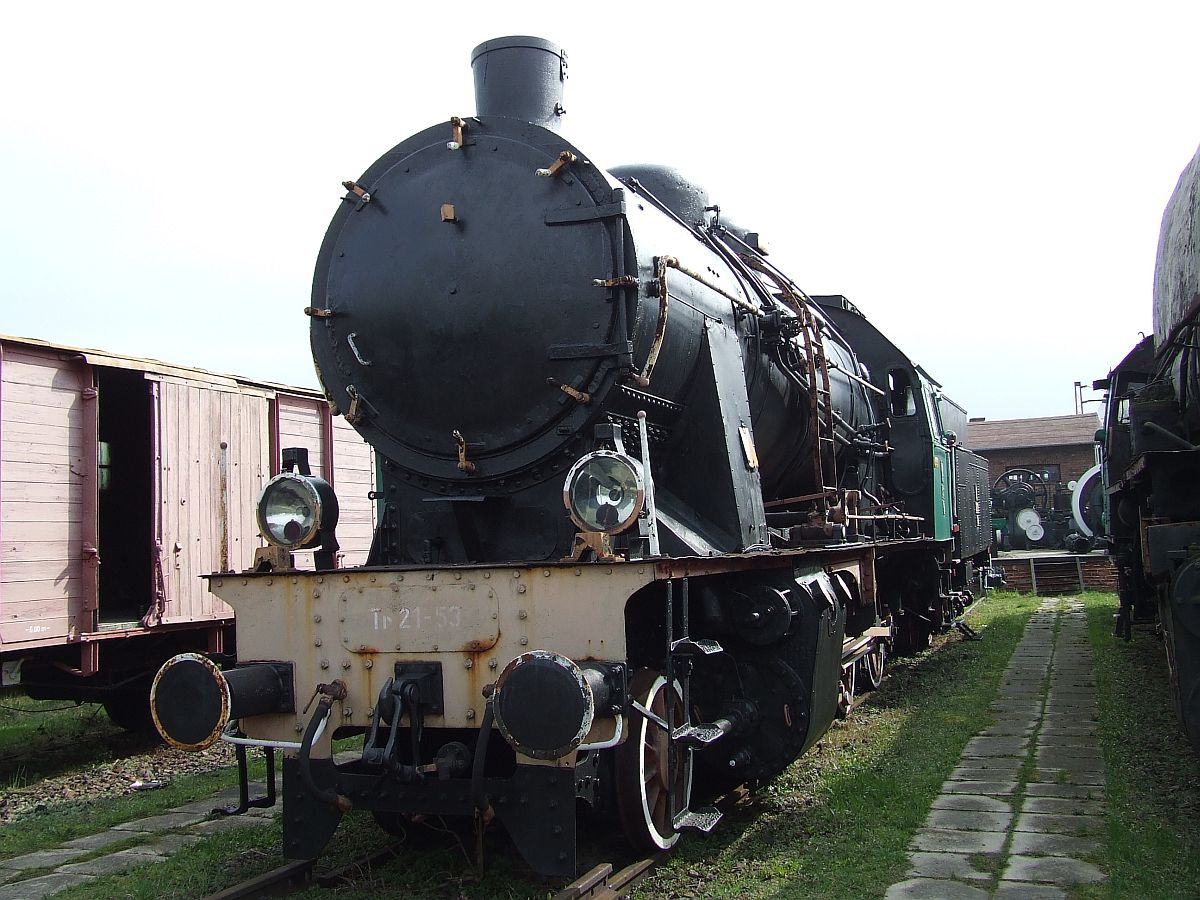
Tr21-53 at museum in Zduńska-Wola

Another Polish 2-8-0 locomotive was TKr55. TKr55 was a prototype steam engine designed in Poznań in 1955 and built in Wrocław in 1957. New unit was created for shunting operations. It was based on the Tr203 (USATC S160) chassis, had a boiler similar to American locomotives and the cabine from the Polish TKt48. The only prototype locomotive built was used in Kutno until late 1970s when it was scrapped.

=== Russia ===
In Russia, the 2-8-0 wheel arrangement was represented by the prerevolutionary Sch (Shuka-pike) class. These two-cylinder compound locomotives without superheaters were declared the standard Russian freight locomotive in 1912, but since they were relatively low-powered, they were only useful on easier lines without steep gradients such as the Saint Petersburg-Moscow route.

=== South Africa ===
Five 2-8-0 locomotive classes saw service in South Africa, all of them initially acquired by the Cape Government Railways (CGR), which classified all but two as 8th Class. All of them were variations on the same design, used saturated steam, and had cylinders with overhead slide valves, actuated by inside Stephenson valve gear.

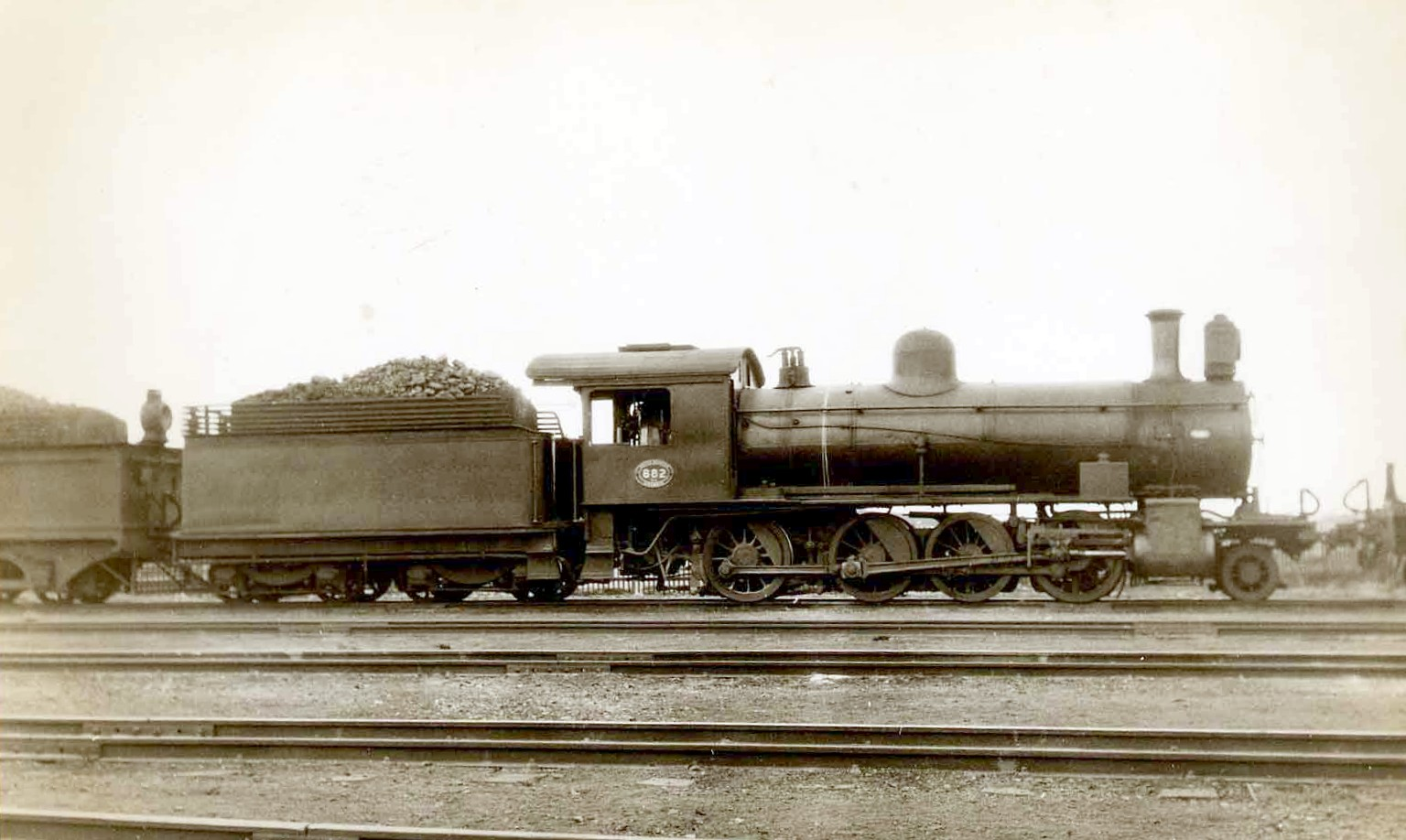
SAR Class 8X, circa 1930

- In 1901 and 1902, the CGR placed 16 Consolidations in service. Designed by H.M. Beatty, chief locomotive superintendent of the CGR from 1896 to 1910, they were ordered from the Schenectady Locomotive Works in the United States and partly delivered by Schenectady in 1901, with the remainder delivered from the newly established American Locomotive Company in 1902. Conceived as mixed-traffic locomotives, they had bar frames and narrow fireboxes. In 1912, when these locomotives were assimilated into the South African Railways (SAR), they were designated Class 8X.
- In 1902, the CGR also placed a single experimental tandem compound Consolidation in service, based on its Schenectady/ALCO-built 8th Class. Delivered by ALCO in 1902, the locomotive was not classified and was simply referred to as the Tandem Compound. In 1912, it was designated Class Experimental 2 on the SAR.

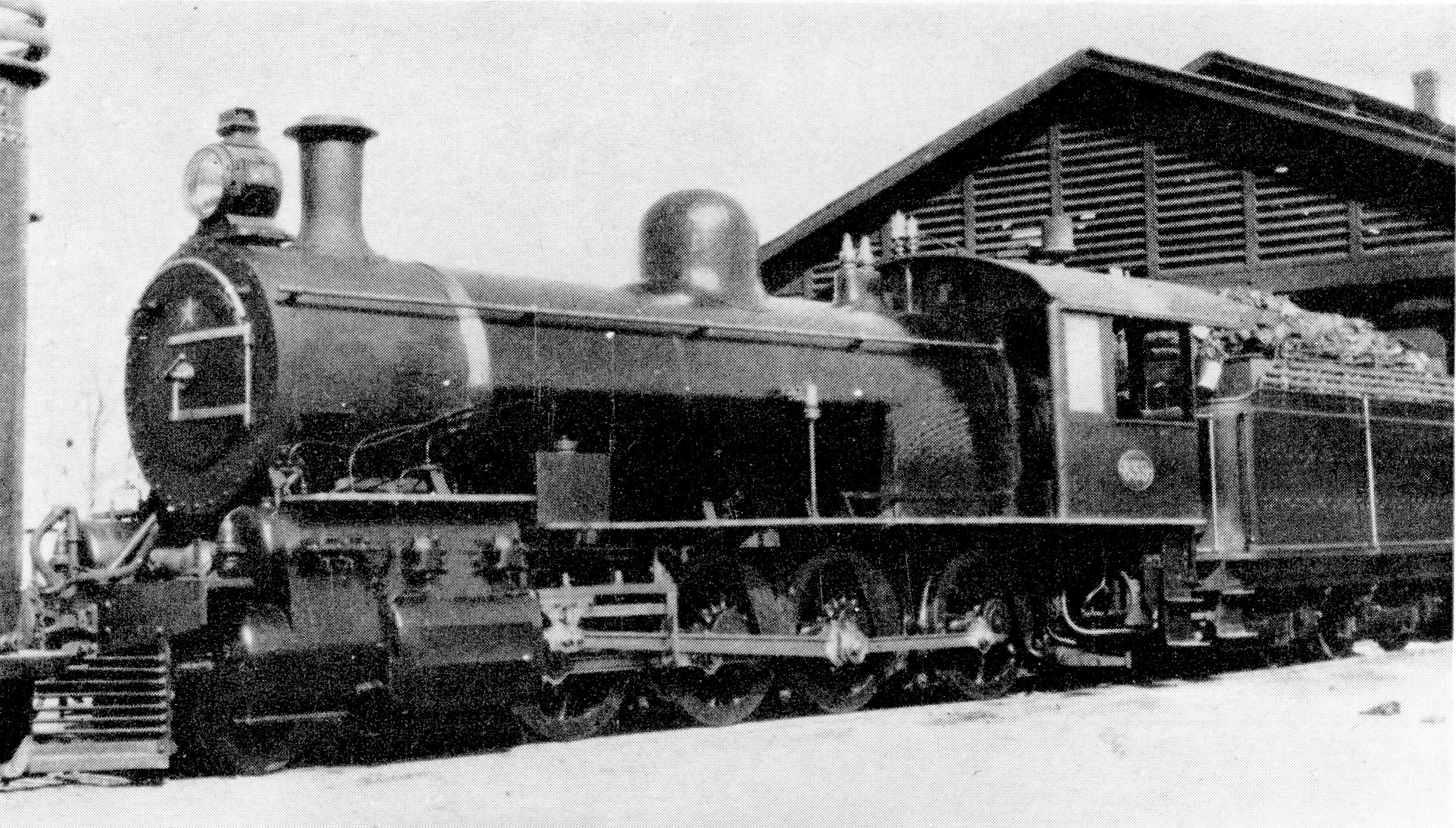
SAR Class Experimental 2

- In 1903, the CGR received a second experimental tandem compound Consolidation from ALCO. It was similar to the earlier one, but with a larger fire grate and an increased heating surface which enhanced its steaming ability. It also remained unclassified and was also simply referred to as a Tandem Compound. In 1912, it was designated Class Experimental 3 on the SAR.
- Also in 1903, the CGR received four more Consolidations from Kitson and Company of Hunslet in Leeds. They were very similar to the earlier Schenectady and ALCO-built Consolidations, but with the boiler pitch raised by 2 in (51 mm). Coupled with a shallow firebox, this enabled the grate to be extended out sideways over the fourth set of drivers, resulting in a grate area of 30.9 sq ft (2.871 m^{2}) compared to the 20 sq ft (1.858 m^{2}) of the previous model. In 1912, they were designated Class 8Y on the SAR.

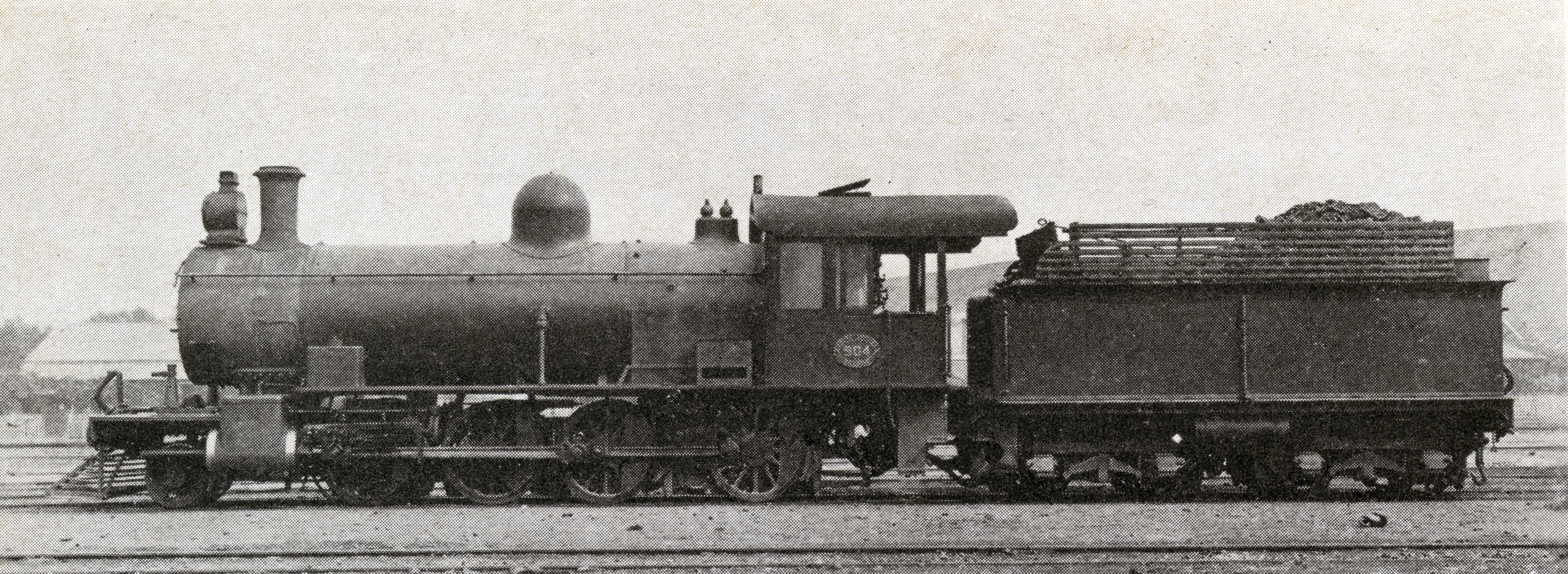
SARClass 8Z

- In 1904, the CGR placed its last eight Consolidations in service. These were ordered from the North British Locomotive Company of Glasgow in Scotland and were very similar to the previous four Kitson-built locomotives, but slightly larger in boiler and firegrate area dimensions. In 1912, these eight were designated Class 8Z on the SAR.

While subjecting the Consolidations to exhaustive testing on all types of traffic and under varying conditions, some trouble was experienced with the leading pony truck and it was dropped in favour of a four-wheeled bogie in later orders for more eighth class locomotives. All subsequent Cape eighth class locomotives were therefore built with a 4-8-0 Mastodon wheel arrangement.

=== South West Africa ===
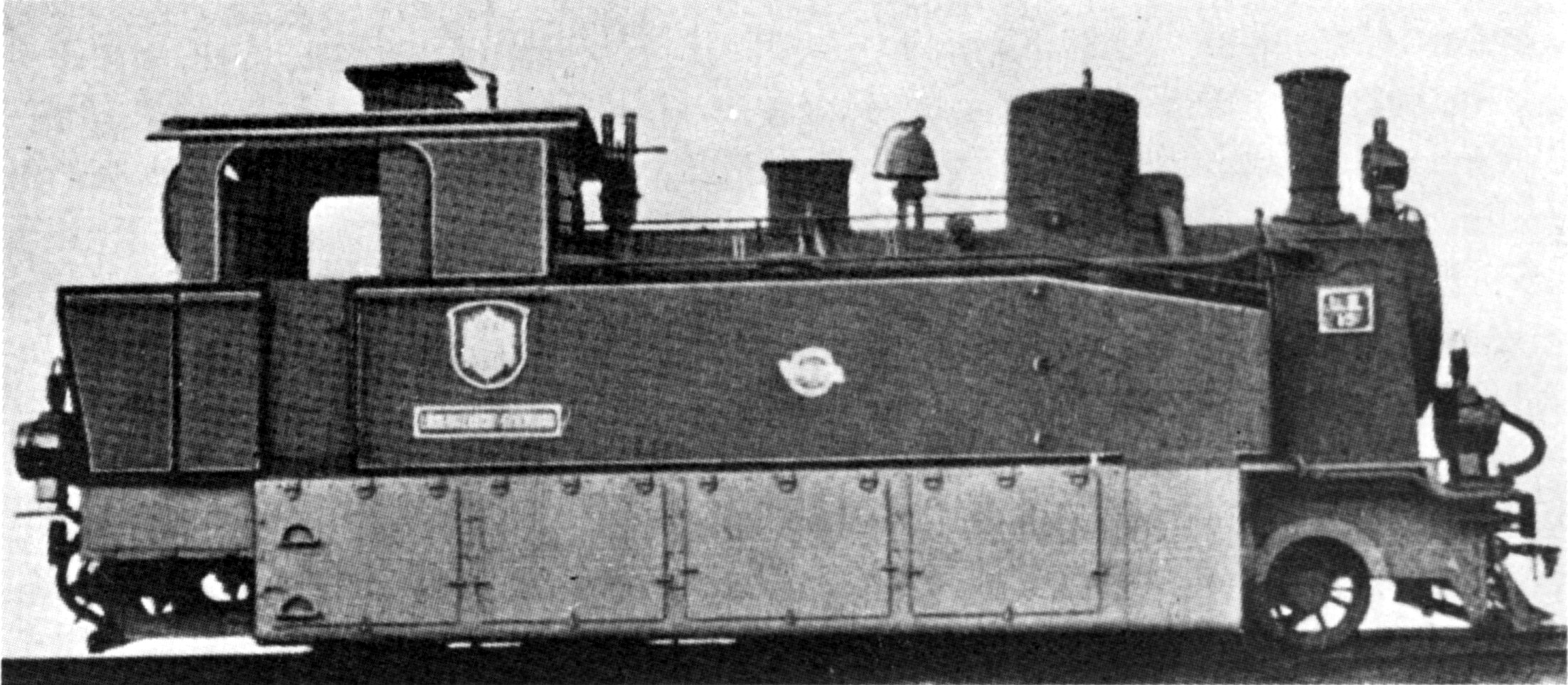
DSWA eight-coupled tank

In 1907 and 1910, the Staatsbahn Keetmanshoop (Keetmanshoop State Railway) in German South West Africa placed 21 tank locomotives in service. After the first World War, when all railways in the territory came under the administration of the South African Railways in 1922, five locomotives of the batch of 1910 survived. They were not classified or renumbered, but were referred to as the eight-coupled tanks.

In 1911, nine tender locomotives were placed in service by the Staatsbahn Lüderitzbucht-Keetmanshoop (Lüderitzbucht-Keetmanshoop State Railway). After the first World War, all nine locomotives came onto the roster of the SAR, where they were referred to as the eight-coupled tenders.

=== Sweden ===
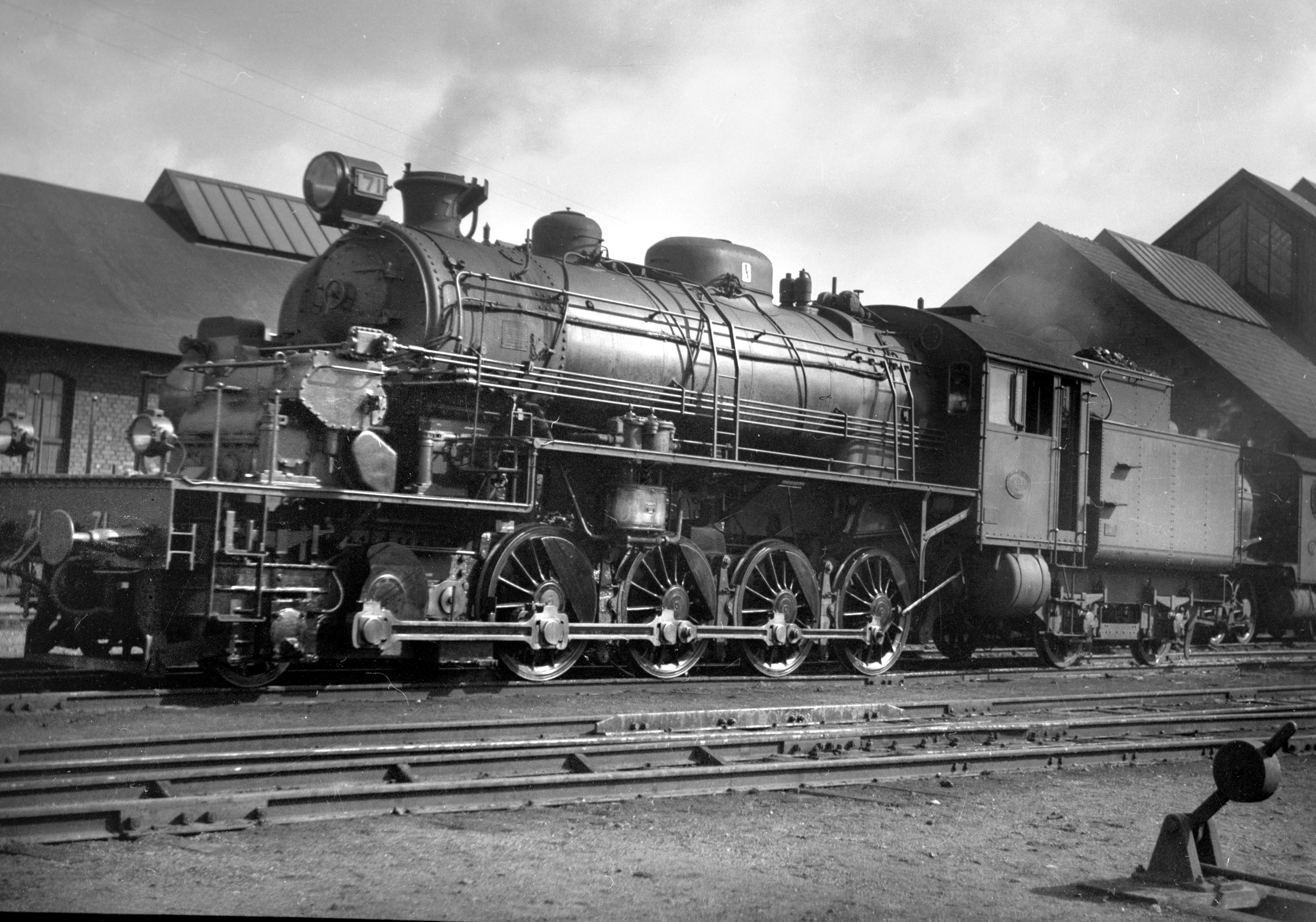
Swedish M3t Steam Turbine Locomotive

The unusual M3t Turbine Steam Locomotive was of this type. 90 of the Swedish E (0-8-0) class were rebuilt between 1935 and 1951 and given a lead truck, designated the class E2.

=== Turkey ===
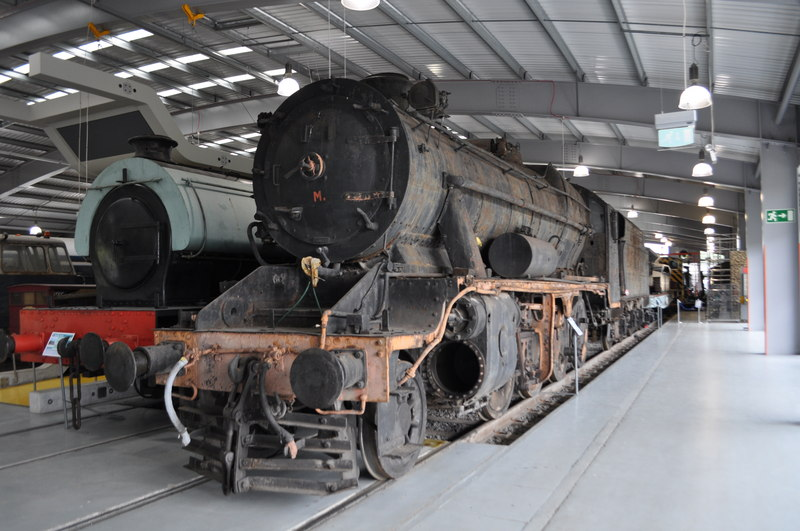
Turkish 8F at the National Railway Museum, Shildon, England

Turkey was a neutral country during the Second World War and to retain Turkish goodwill, Great Britain supplied several locomotives to the Turkish Railways, where they were classified 8F.

Two of these 8F class locomotives were brought back from Turkey early in 2011 and one of them is on display at the National Railway Museum in Shildon, England.

=== United Kingdom ===
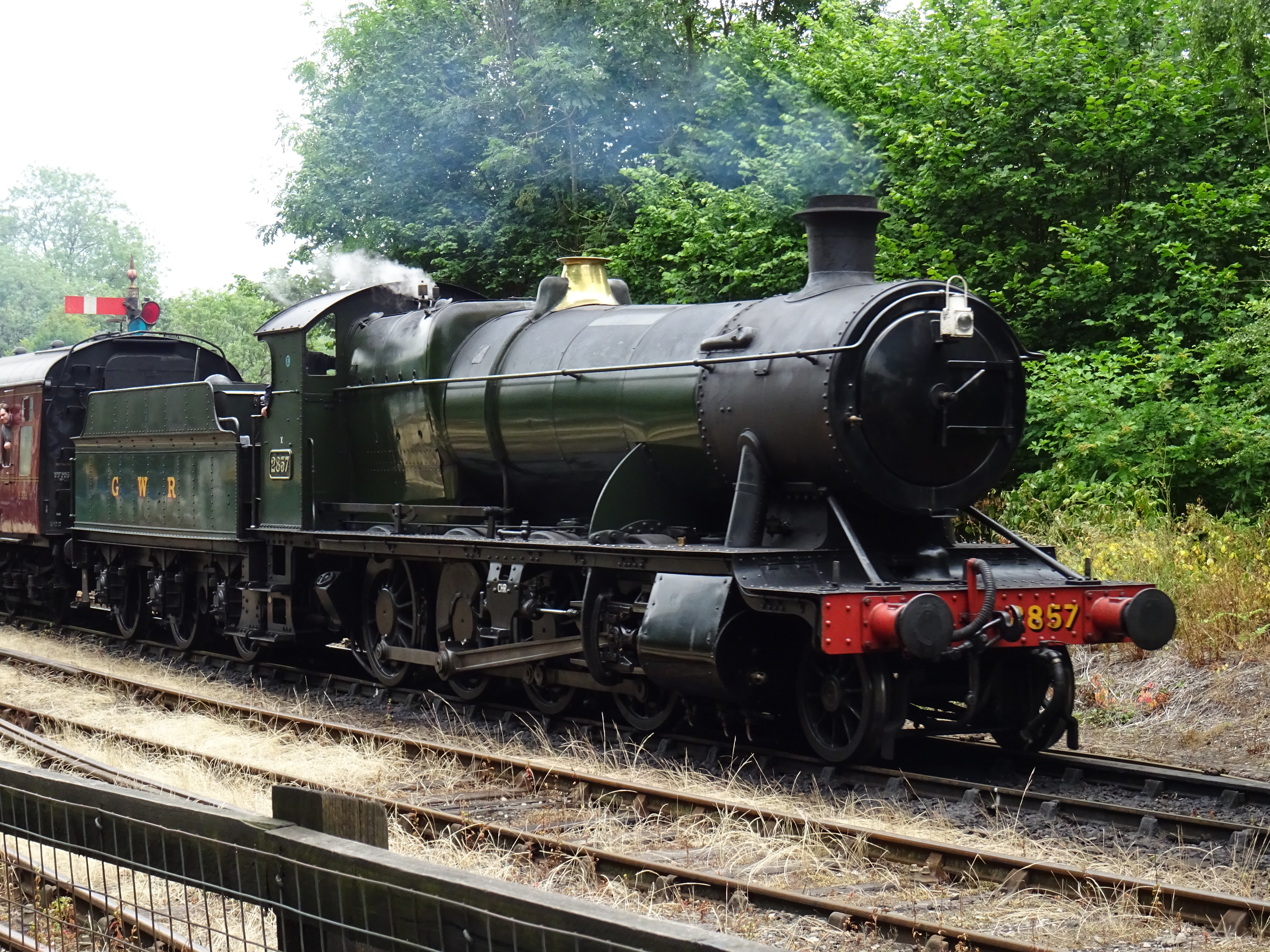
GWR 2800 Class

The 2-8-0 gradually became the standard heavy-freight steam locomotive type in the United Kingdom during the first half of the 20th century, replacing the 0-8-0 types that had appeared as mineral locomotives in the 1890s. These had themselves been a replacement for these heavier tasks of the 0-6-0 locomotives used for freight since the mid 19th century. The 0-6-0 remained a common type for lighter use and on branch lines, but the 0-8-0 largely disappeared in favour of the better-riding 2-8-0.

The first 2-8-0 to be built in Britain was the Great Western Railway's 2800 Class, with 84 locomotives built between 1903 and 1919, followed by a further 83 of the very similar GWR 2884 Class between 1938 and 1942. In 1904, George Whale of the London and North Western Railway (LNWR) began to rebuild some of his predecessor's Class B 0-8-0 compound locomotives to 2-8-0, classes E and F.

With coal trains increasing in size and scale, the GWR needed to develop a more powerful locomotive to meet these requirements, on what were relatively short haul routes. Thus in 1906, Chief Engineer G.J. Churchward took the basic design of his GWR 2800 Class, and adapted it. After proposing a 2-8-2T design, Churchward developed the UK's first 2-8-0 tank engine, the 4200 class.

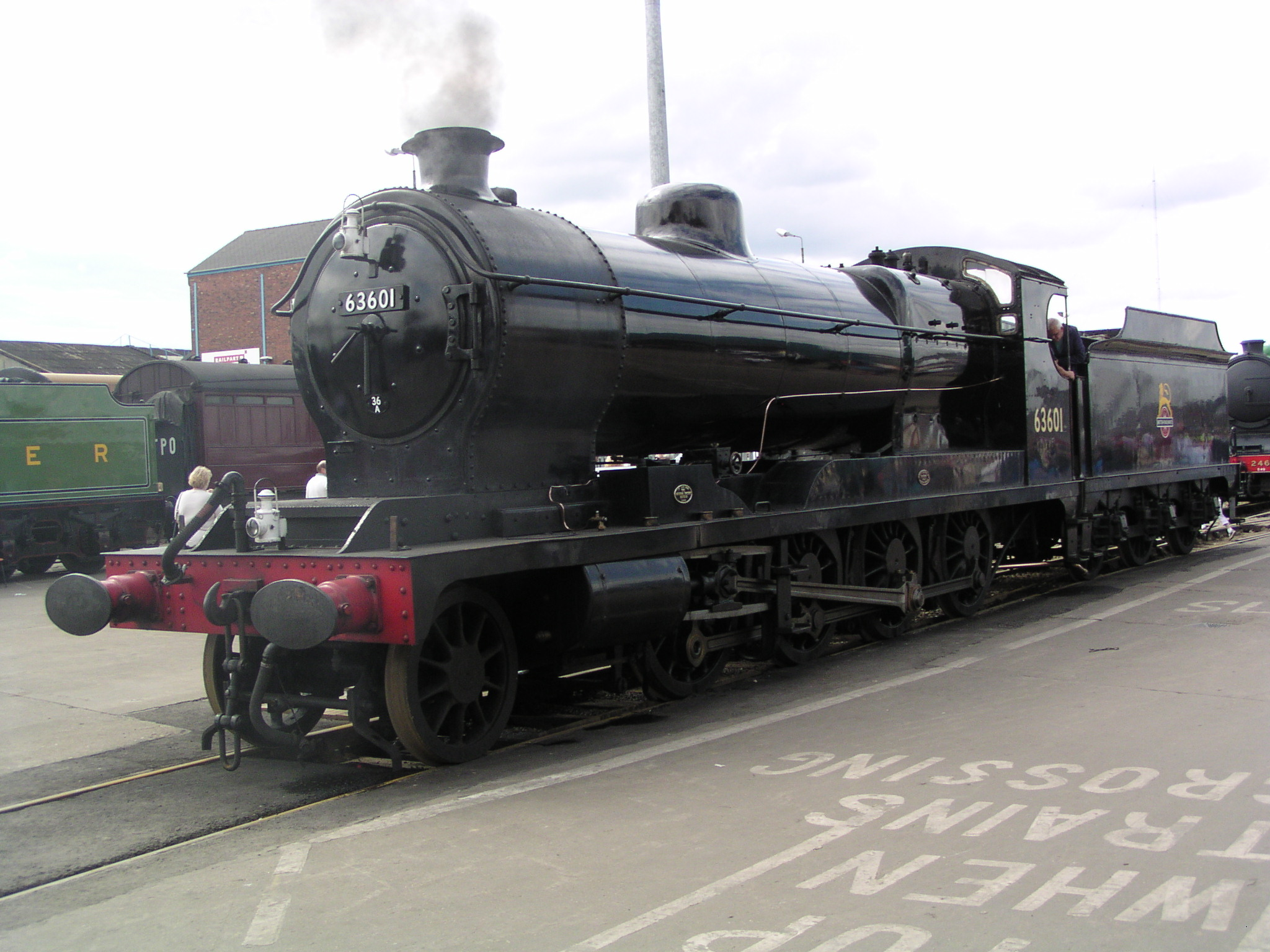
Preserved GCR Class 8K

In 1911, John G. Robinson of the Great Central Railway (GCR) introduced his very successful GCR Class 8K for heavy freight. 129 of these were originally built by the GCR. During the First World War, the design was adopted by the Ministry of Munitions and it became the standard locomotive of the Railway Operating Division of the Royal Engineers as the ROD 2-8-0. Altogether, 521 of these ROD locomotives were built during the war. After the war, large numbers of these were purchased by the LNWR and GWR, while some were also sold to a private Australian coal company, J&A Brown in New South Wales. Altogether, 273 were purchased by the LNWR during the early 1920s.

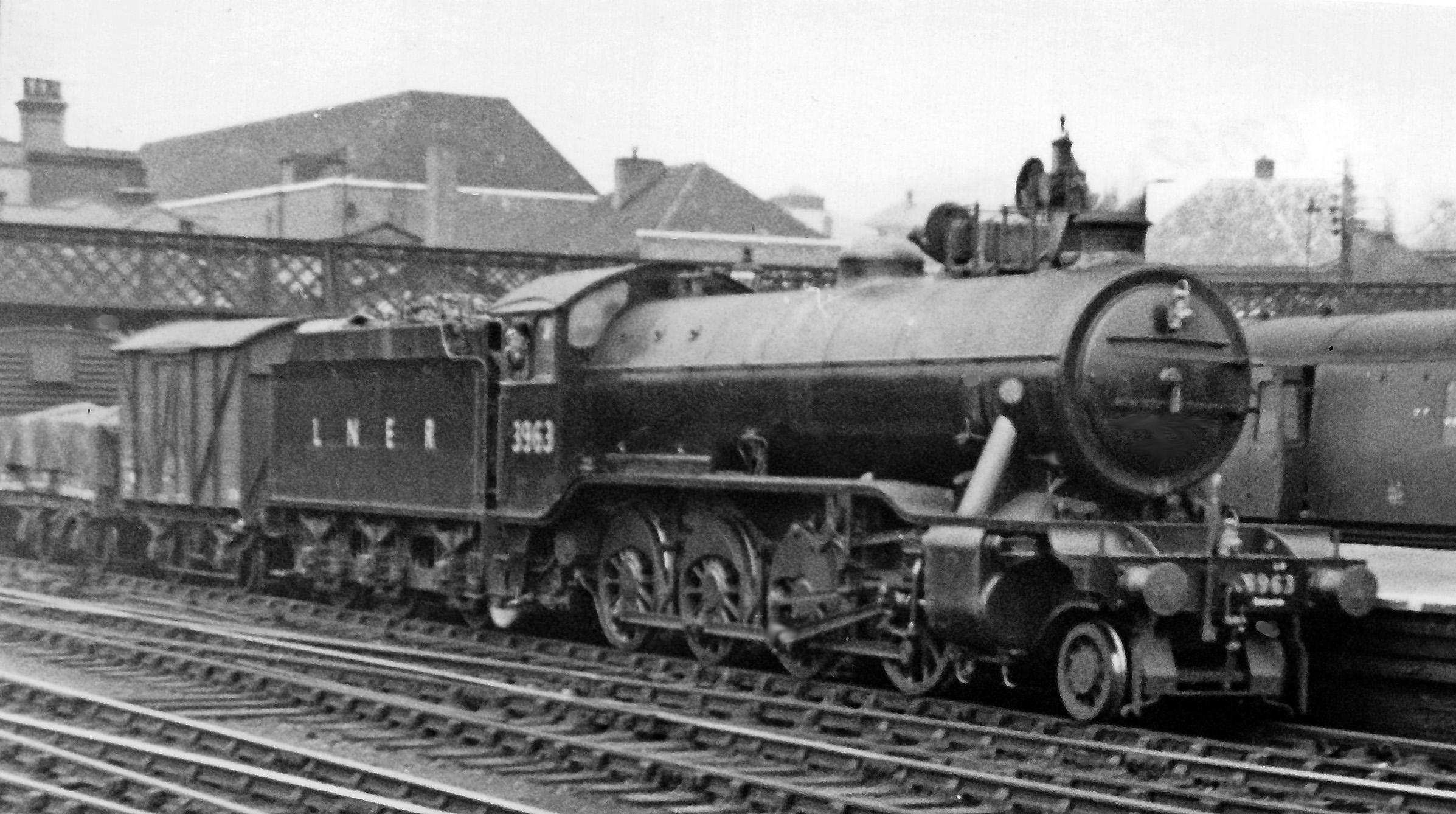
GNR Class O2

Other successful 2-8-0 designs were built in the UK. The GNR Class O1 and O2 were introduced by Nigel Gresley of the Great Northern Railway in 1913 and 1918, respectively, and the Class 7F by Henry Fowler of the Somerset and Dorset Joint Railway in 1914. Whilst most British 2-8-0 designs were intended for heavy freight, the GWR 4700 Class were designed for heavy mixed-traffic work, but were initially employed mainly on fast overnight freight trains; later they were used on express excursions in the summer.

The most successful British 2-8-0 class was the Class 8F, designed in 1935 by William Stanier for the London, Midland and Scottish Railway. By 1946, 852 had been built. During the Second World War, the War Department originally chose the class 8F as its standard freight locomotive, and large numbers of them saw service overseas, notably in the Middle East.

The Class 8F was superseded after 1943 by the cheaper WD Austerity 2-8-0 for war service. A total of 935 of these were built and again, many saw service overseas.

=== United States ===
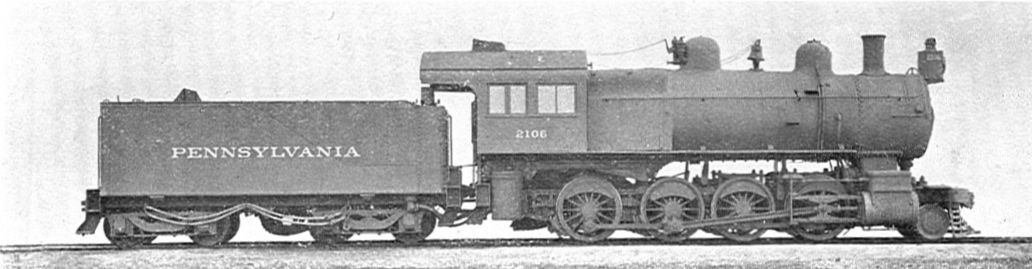
Pennsylvania Railroad Consolidation No. 2106, circa 1907

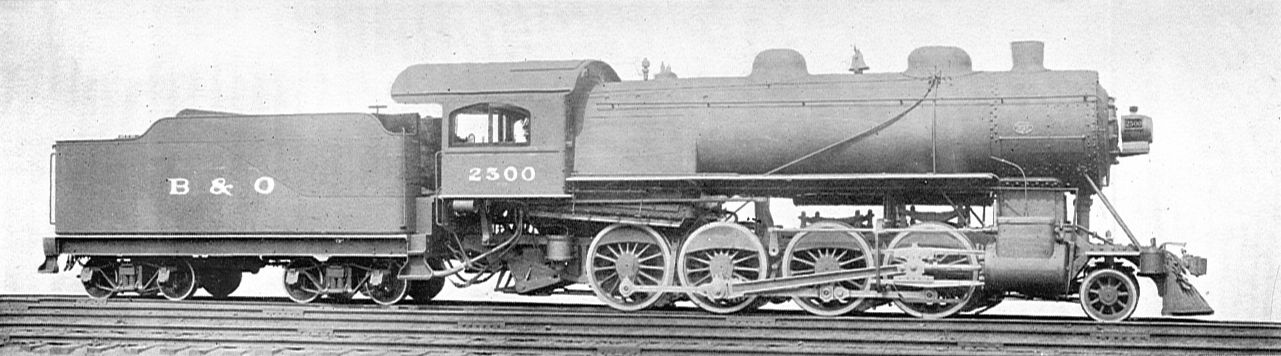
Baltimore & Ohio Consolidation No. 2300, circa 1907

In the United States, only a few railroads purchased Consolidation types when Baldwin Locomotive Works first introduced its version. Even the Baltimore and Ohio railroad, which eventually had nearly 180 2-8-0 locomotives in regular service by 1885, did not purchase any of this type until 1873. The Buffalo, Rochester and Pittsburgh Railway, which eventually became part of B&O, purchased 15 of this type from Brooks Locomotive Works in 1883.

The 2-8-0 design was given a major boost in 1875, when the Pennsylvania Railroad made it their standard freight locomotive, and 1875 was also when the Erie Railroad began replacing its 4-4-0s in freight service with 2-8-0s. The railroads had found that the 2-8-0 could move trains twice as heavy at half the cost of its predecessors. From a financial standpoint at the time, the choice of the 2-8-0 as new freight locomotive was therefore clear.

The S160 Class of the United States Army Transportation Corps was built by American manufacturers and was designed for use in Europe for heavy freight work during the Second World War. A total of 2,120 of this class was built and they worked on railroads across the world. Production of the 2-8-0 type in the United States totalled more than 23,000 locomotives, of which 12,000 were export versions.

==== Preservation ====
Great Northern Railway Consolidation No. 1147 is on display in a park in Wenatchee, Washington.

Great Northern Railway Consolidation No. 1246 is in storage in southern Oregon.

Maine Central class W 2-8-0 locomotives numbered 501 and 519 were officially property of the European and North American Railway (E&NA) as a condition of the lease of that company by the Maine Central Railroad. While all other Maine Central steam locomotives were scrapped when replaced by diesel locomotives, these two survived as a lease obligation until Maine Central purchased E&NA in 1955. The advantages of preservation were recognized by that date, so No. 501 is awaiting restoration to operating condition at the Conway Scenic Railroad in Conway, New Hampshire, and No. 519 was on display at the Steamtown National Historic Site in Scranton, Pennsylvania.

Southern Pacific No. 895, a 2-8-0 Consolidation locomotive built by ALCO in 1913 is on static display at Roseland Park in Baytown, Texas. SP No. 895 was retired after 44 years of service and donated by Southern Pacific Railroad to the Robert E. Lee High School Key Club, then towed on temporary tracks to its current location at Roseland Park in April, 1957.

Southern Pacific 2579 is on static display under a shed in Klamath Falls, Oregon.

Baltimore & Ohio No. 545 "A.J Cromwell", built in 1888, is preserved at the National Museum of Railroad History & Innovation in Baltimore, Maryland.

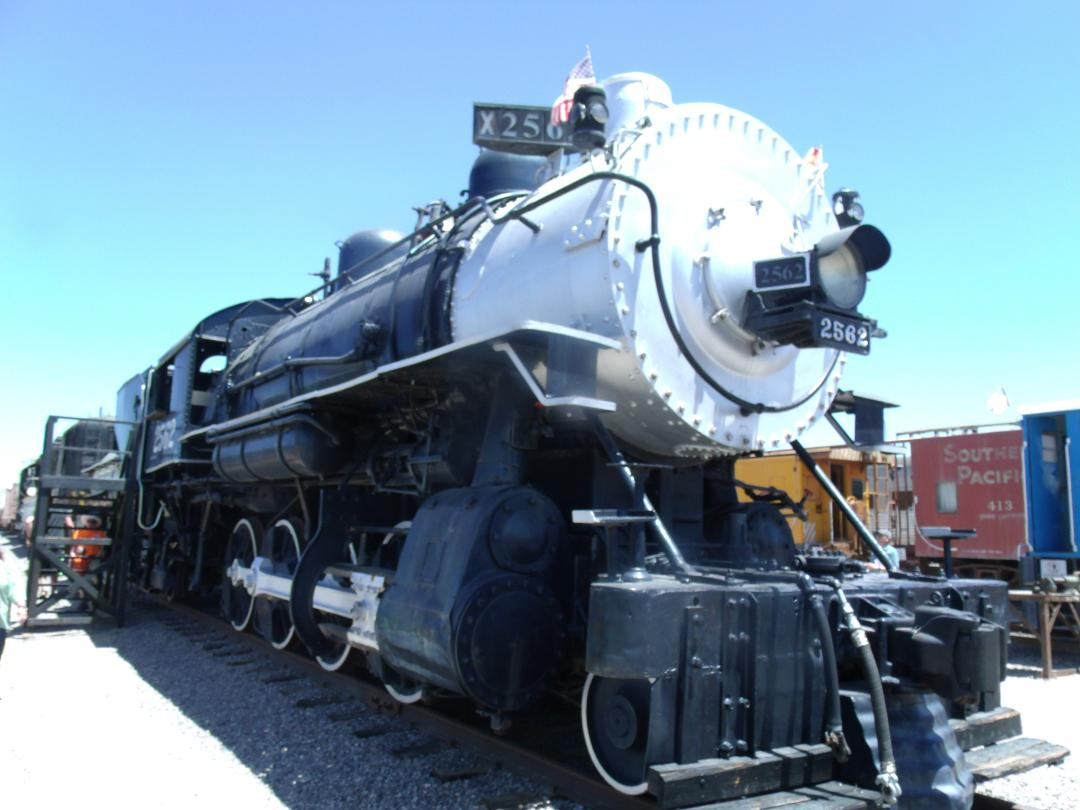
Southern Pacific's No. 2562

The Southern Pacific Railroad's locomotive No. 2562 was built by the Baldwin Locomotive Works in 1909, serial No. 29064. It is on exhibit in the Arizona Railway Museum in Chandler, Arizona. The locomotive and its tender are listed in the National Register of Historic Places, reference No. 09000511.

The Atchison, Topeka, and Santa Fe Railroad's class 759 locomotive No. 761 was built around 1890. When active, it was used on the railroad's mainline between Chicago and the west. No. 761 is plinthed next to the historic Wickenburg, Arizona, train depot that is now the town's visitor center.

Santa Fe class 769 locomotive No. 769 is currently on static display in Madrid, New Mexico, but is awaiting a future restoration to run on the Santa Fe Southern Railway.

Denver and Rio Grande Western No. 346 is undergoing it 1,472 day inspection to return to service at the Colorado Railroad Museum. Rio Grande No. 318 is also on static display at the same museum, along with Denver, Leadville and Gunnison 191.

Denver and Rio Grande Western No. 315 is operational and owned by the Durango Historical Society.

Both Denver and Rio Grande Western No. 340 and Rio Grande Southern No. 41 are currently in service at Knotts Berry Farm in Buena Park, Ca.

The Colorado & Southern (C&S) narrow-gauge No. 60 is on display in Idaho Springs, Colorado, while C&S No. 71 is in Central City, Colorado.

A Ks1 class 2-8-0, No. 630, is run and maintained in Chattanooga, Tennessee, by the Tennessee Valley Railroad Museum. In 2014, this locomotive participated in the Norfolk Southern 21st Century Steam program.

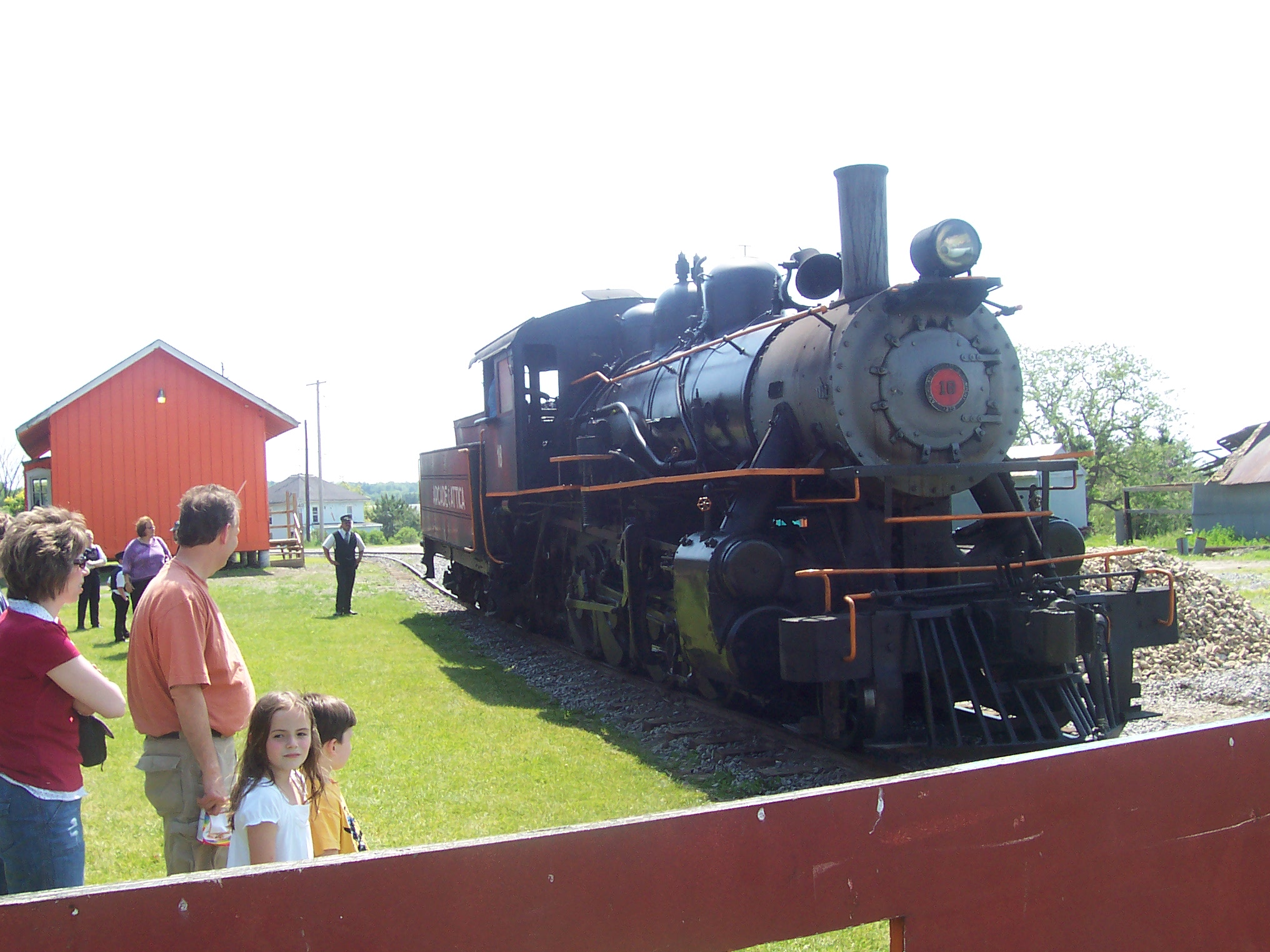
No. 18 operating at the Arcade and Attica Railroad.

In 1962, the Arcade and Attica Railroad purchased an ALCO-build locomotive from the Boyne City Railroad in Michigan. The locomotive, now numbered 18, is billed as the last operating steam excursion in New York State.

Three out of the four SC-1 hogs from the Lake Superior and Ishpeming survived being scrapped. Engine No. 33 has been restored by the Hocking Valley Scenic Railway, before being purchased by the Age of Steam Roundhouse in Sugarcreek, Ohio, where it operates today. Engine No. 35 has been on static display at the Illinois Railway Museum in Union, Illinois since 1985.

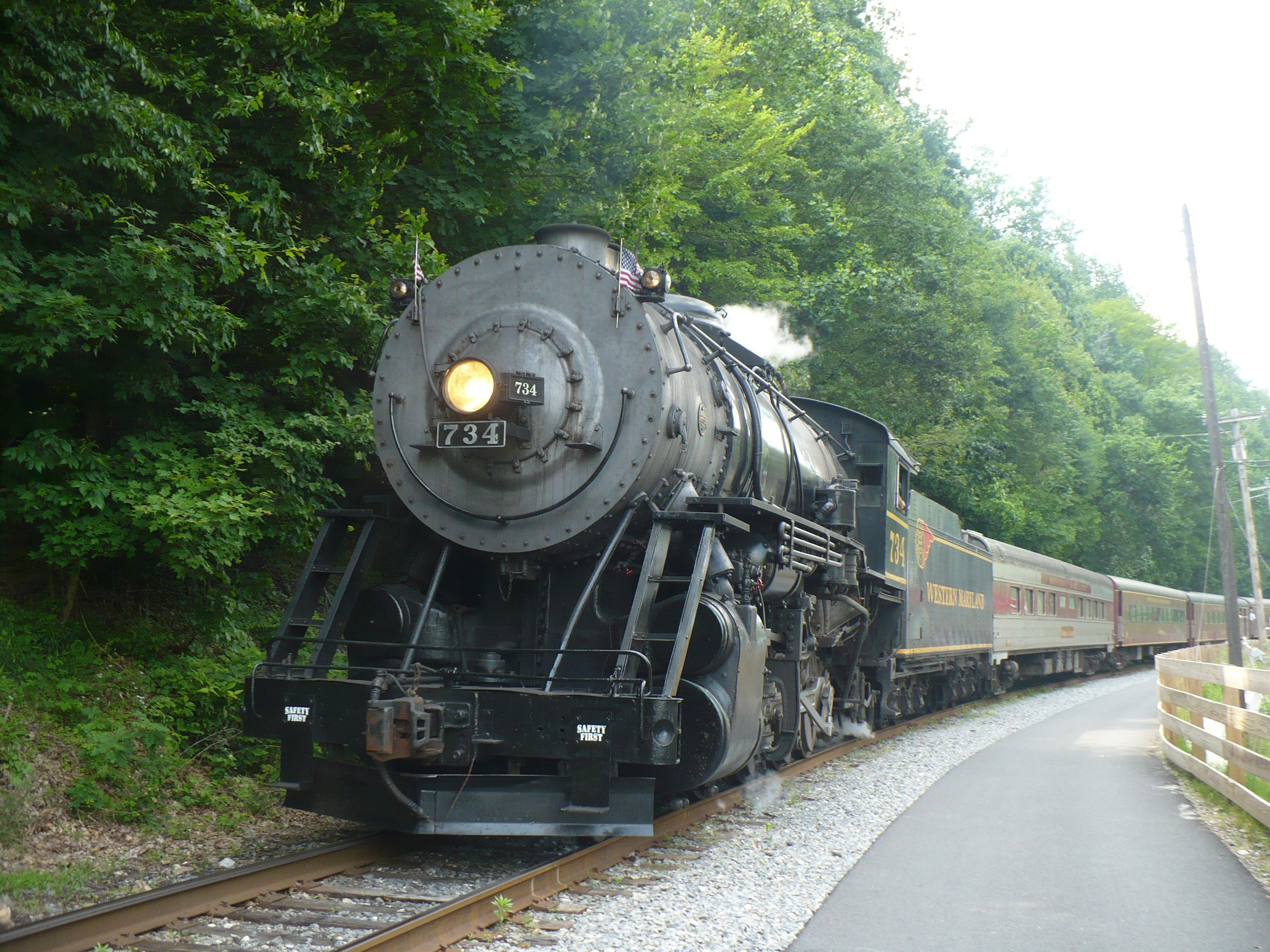
No. 734 operating at the Western Maryland Scenic Railroad.

In 1991, the Western Maryland Scenic Railroad, based in Cumberland, Maryland, acquired SC-1 class No. 734. The locomotive was restored to operating condition and cosmetically changed to look like an original Western Maryland 2-8-0. The locomotive was renumbered 734 in honor, so to speak, of the H-7 (Nos. 701-764) class of 2-8-0 that the Western Maryland harbored and of which none was preserved, although it has an overall appearance of an H-8. Over the years it was overworked and according to the WMSR 734 is in very poor mechanical condition. It was pulled from service officially in 2016. As of 2023, Mountain Thunder, as No. 734 is nicknamed, is undergoing restoration to operating condition.

In the late 1980s, four ex-LS&I 2-8-0s were purchased by the Grand Canyon Railway based in Williams, Arizona. They were Nos. 18, 19, 20, and 29. Only No. 29 remains in Williams, it was restored to service in 2026. No. 18 is stored at the Colebrookdale Railroad in Boyertown, Pennsylvania,awaiting restoration to service. No. 19 is on static display in Frisco, Texas, and No. 20 is on static display in Allan, Texas.

Other preserved Ex-LS&I 2-8-0s include No. 21, which is being rebuilt in Wisconsin, No. 22, which is on static display at the Mid-Continent Railway Museum in North Freedom, Wisconsin, No. 23, which is stored at the Empire State Railway Museum in Phoenicia, New York, and No. 24, which is on static display at the National Railroad Museum in Green Bay, Wisconsin.

UPRR No. 561 is on static display along US Highway 81 in Columbus, Nebraska.

UPRR No. 423 is on static display on 10th street in Gering, Nebraska.

UPRR No. 6072 is on static display at Wyman park in Fort Riley, Kansas.

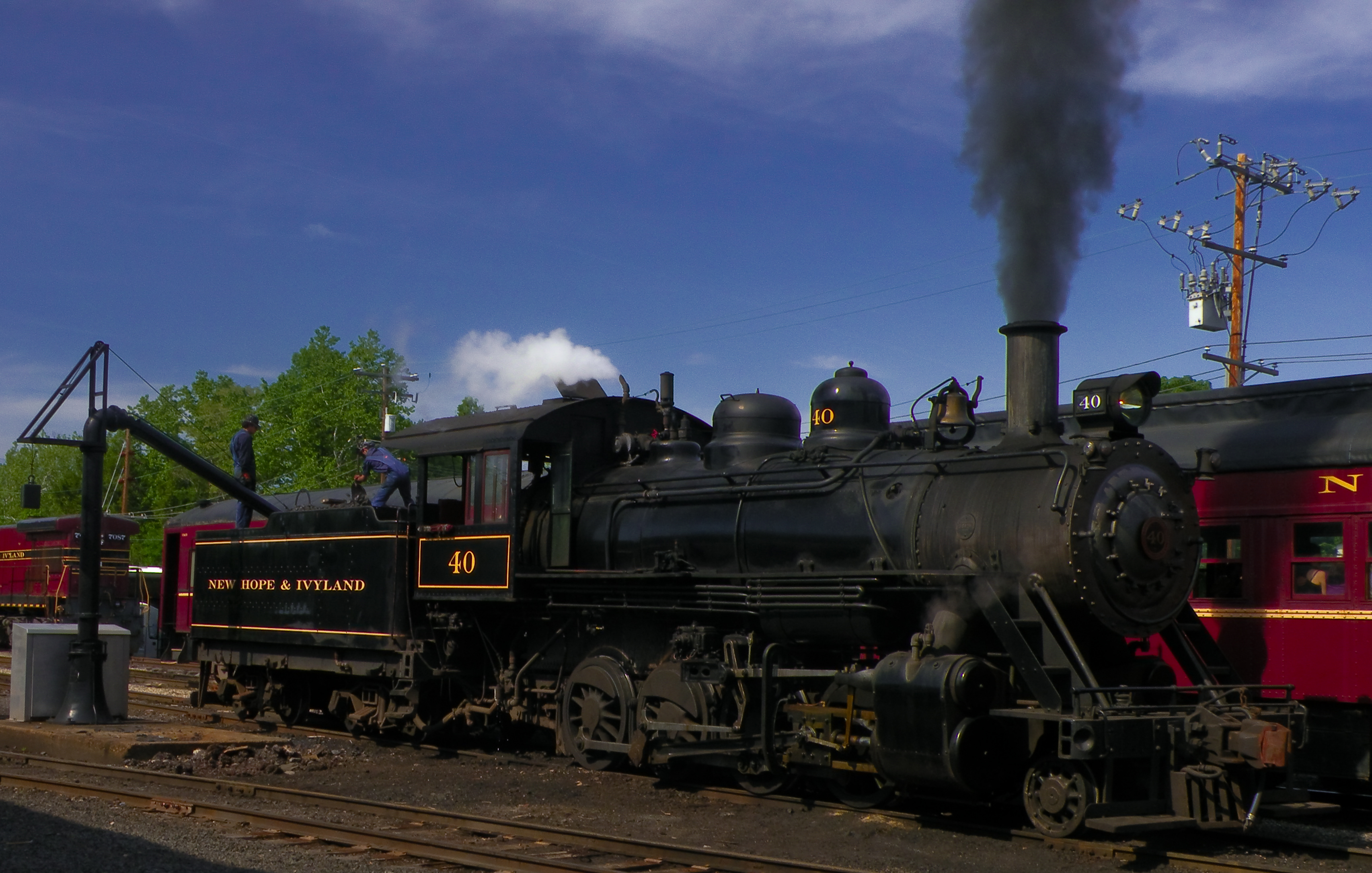
No. 40 operating at the New Hope Railroad.

Baldwin Locomotive Works No. 40, built in December 1925 for the Lancaster and Chester Railroad in South Carolina, and later purchased by the Cliffside Railroad in North Carolina, now pulls scenic excursion trains at the New Hope and Ivyland Railroad in New Hope, Pennsylvania, which opened in August, 1966.

Great Western No. 60, built in August 1937 by the American Locomotive Company in Schenectady, New York, is currently operated on the Black River and Western Railroad in Ringoes, New Jersey. No. 60 originally operated on the Great Western Railway of Colorado.

Baldwin Steam Locomotive No. 1702, built in 1942 for the United States Army, was purchased by the Great Smoky Mountains Railroad (GSMR) of Bryson City, North Carolina, in the mid-1990s for use on its scenic railway excursions. After a decade of service, No. 1702 was retired in 2004. In October 2012, a partnership formed between GSMR and Swain County to provide funding to restore the locomotive. In 2013, a complete restoration was launched and the locomotive returned to service during summer 2016.

Pennsylvania Railroad No. 1187, of the class R, later H3, is on display at the Railroad Museum of Pennsylvania in Strasburg, Lancaster County, Pennsylvania. This class is described in detail in the book Set Up Running: The Life of a Pennsylvania Railroad Engineman 1904-1949.

No. 97 on static display at the Valley Railroad.

The Valley Railroad, operating in Connecticut as the Essex Steam Train and Riverboat, has one 2-8-0, No. 97 built in 1923 by the American Locomotive Company’s Cooke Machine Works in Paterson, New Jersey for use in Cuba. It stayed at Cooke until the Works’ closure in 1926 and started service on the Birmingham and Southeastern Railroad in Alabama as No. 200. It ran various excursions on the Vermont Railway and New Haven Railroad in the late 1960s under a private owner. No. 97 arrived in Essex in 1970 initially operating between 1973 and 2010. It returned to service in October 2018.

Virginia & Truckee No. 29 is currently operational on the Virginia and Truckee Railroad headquartered in Virginia City, Nevada.

Two USATC General Pershing locomotives survive in the United States. No. 28 is currently undergoing repair to run again at the Texas State Railroad in Palestine, Texas, and No. 101 is on static display at the National Railroad Museum in Green Bay, Wisconsin.
