= NZR O class =

Class of steam locomotives in New Zealand

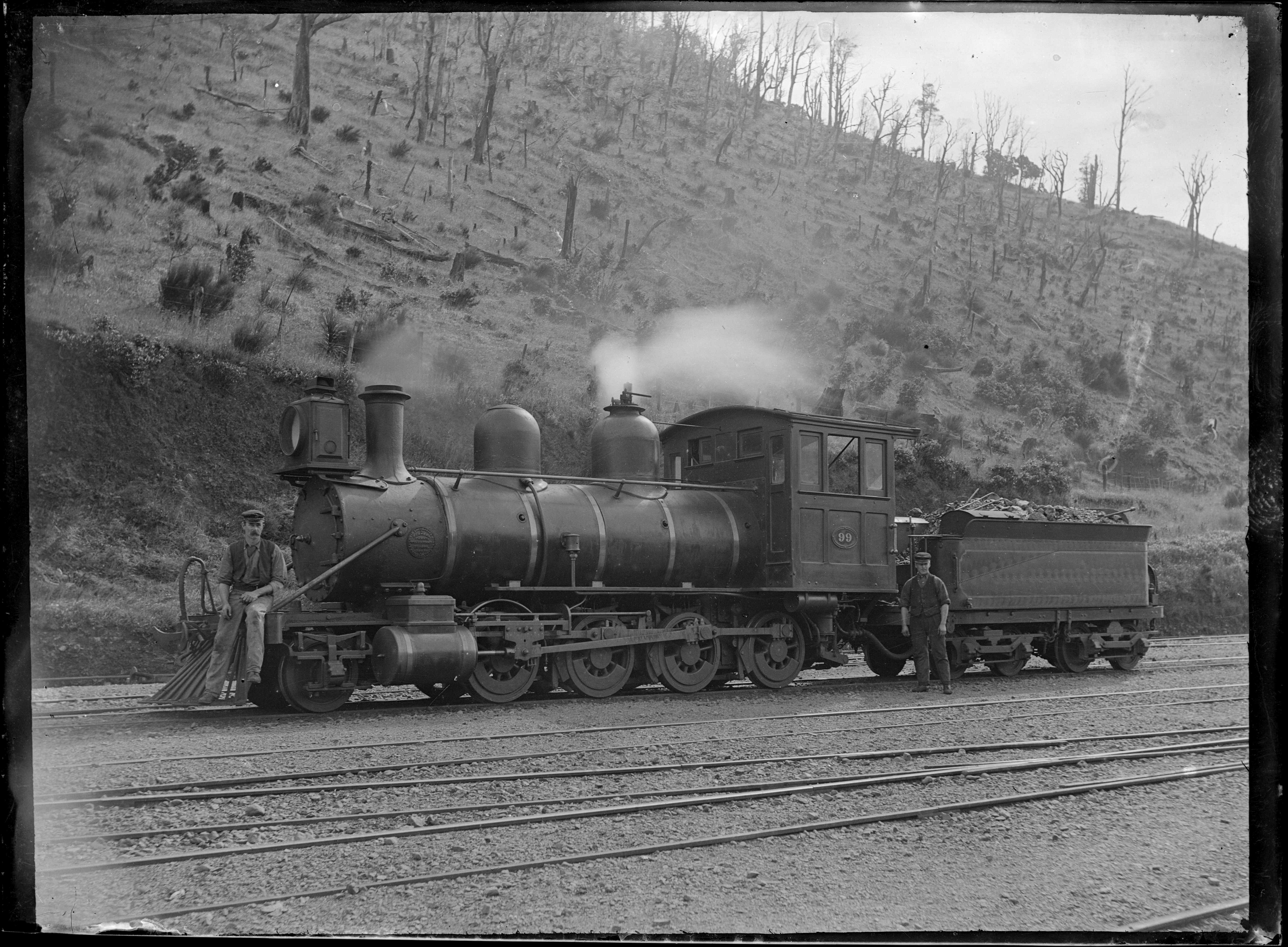
- O Class 2-8-0 steam locomotive NZR number 99
Type and origin
- Power type: Steam
- Builder: Baldwin Locomotive Works
- Serial number: 7565–7569, 7572 (not in engine number order)
- Build date: 1885
Specifications
- Configuration
  - Whyte: 2-8-0
- Gauge: 3 ft 6 in (1,067 mm)
- Driver dia.: 36.25 in (0.921 m)
- Length: 46 ft 3 in (14.10 m)
- Adhesive weight: 25.2 long tons (25.6 tonnes; 28.2 short tons)
- Total weight: 45.5 long tons (46.2 t; 51.0 short tons)
- Firebox
  - Grate area: 15.2 sq ft (1.41 m^{2})
- Boiler pressure: 130 lbf/in^{2} (896 kPa)
- Heating surface: 908 sq ft (84.4 m^{2})
- Cylinders: Two, outside
- Cylinder size: 15 in × 18 in (381 mm × 457 mm)
Performance figures
- Tractive effort: 10,055 lbf (44.73 kN)
Career
- Operators: New Zealand Government Railways
- Number in class: 6
- Numbers: 31, 54, 59, 98-100
- Retired: May 1922

The NZR O class consisted of six steam locomotives that operated on New Zealand's national rail network. Ordered from the Baldwin Locomotive Works of Pennsylvania in 1885, three arrived in time to begin work in December 1885, while two more were placed in service in January 1886, and the sixth in February 1886. After almost four decades of service, all six were withdrawn in May 1922. None survived to be preserved, although two engine frames and 5 tenders from O-class locomotives are known to exist near Summit on the former Rimutaka Incline.

The Baldwin and Rogers locomotives reflected the styling adopted in the 1870s by American builders with elements from the Renaissance Revival and Neo Baroque architectural styles, and Islamic, e.g. Moorish (from Alhambra) influences. Bold colours and painted decorations were used. Many Baldwin locomotives were in Olive Green ground colour, although the Baldwin N and O classes of the 1880s had Tuscan Red ground colour.
