= South West African 2-8-0T =

Steam locomotive from the German South West Africa era

GSWA Eight-Coupled Tank 2-8-0T South West African 2-8-0T
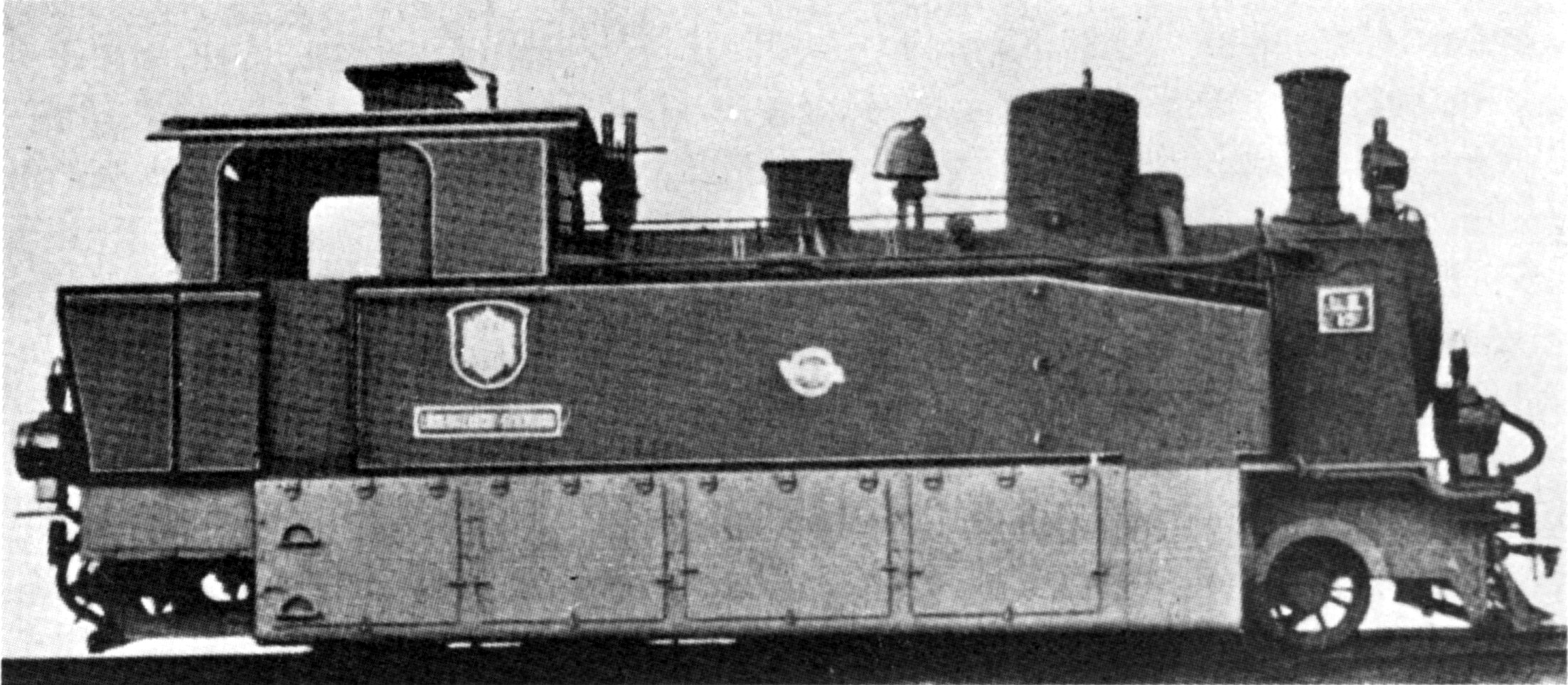
- Eight-coupled tank no. LE 15, c. 1912
Type and origin
- Power type: Steam
- Designer: Orenstein & Koppel
- Builder: Orenstein & Koppel
- Serial number: 1870-1875, 2069-70, 2356-2361, 2731-2734, 3182-3184, 4198-4199
- Build date: 1906-1910
- Total produced: 23
Specifications
- Configuration
  - Whyte: 2-8-0T (Consolidation)
  - UIC: 1'Dnv2t (no. 1-6); 1'Dn2t (all others)
- Driver: 3rd coupled axle
- Gauge: 3 ft 6 in (1,067 mm) Cape gauge
- Leading dia.: 27 9/16 in (700 mm)
- Coupled dia.: 39 3/8 in (1,000 mm)
- Wheelbase: 17 ft 8 5/8 in (5,401 mm)
  - Coupled: 11 ft 9 3/4 in (3,600 mm)
- Length
  - Over couplers: 29 ft 10 1/2 in (9,106 mm)
  - Over beams: 26 ft 3 in (8,001 mm)
- Height: 11 ft 1 7/8 in (3,400 mm)
- Axle load: 7 LT 8 cwt (7,519 kg)
- Loco weight: 34 LT 10 cwt (35,050 kg)
- Fuel type: Coal
- Fuel capacity: 6 LT 5 cwt (6.4 t)
- Water cap.: 1,045 imp gal (4,750 L)
- Firebox
  - Type: Round-top
  - Grate area: 12.5 sq ft (1.16 m^{2})
- Boiler
  - Pitch: 6 ft 3 3/16 in (1,910 mm)
  - Small tubes: 148: 1 3/4 in (44 mm)
- Boiler pressure: 171 psi (1,179 kPa)
- Heating surface: 697 sq ft (64.8 m^{2})
- Cylinders: Two
- Cylinder size: 14 9/16 in (370 mm) bore 19 1/16 in (484 mm) stroke
- High-pressure cylinder: 14 9/16 in (370 mm)
- Low-pressure cylinder: 22 1/16 in (560 mm)
- Valve gear: Heusinger
- Valve type: D trick-ported slide
- Couplers: Buffers-and-chain
Performance figures
- Tractive effort: 13,580 lbf (60.4 kN) @ 75%
Career
- Operators: Lüderitzbucht Eisenbahn; South African Railways
- Number in class: 14
- Numbers: LE 1-18, 20-22, 51-52
- Delivered: 1907-1910
- First run: 1907

The South West African 2-8-0T of 1907 was a steam locomotive from the German South West Africa era.

Between 1907 and 1910, the Lüderitzbucht Eisenbahn (Lüderitzbucht Railway) in German South West Africa placed 23 tank locomotives with a 2-8-0 Consolidation type wheel arrangement in service. After the First World War, when all railways in the territory came under the administration of the South African Railways in 1922, four of these locomotives still survived. They were not classified or renumbered but were simply referred to as the Eight-Coupled Tanks.

== Lüderitzbucht Eisenbahn ==
Construction of a Cape gauge railway line from Lüderitzbucht on the Atlantic coast to Keetmanshoop commenced in 1905. The Lüderitzbucht Eisenbahn, later the Southern State Railway or Südbahn, was completed at a cost of £2,100,000 and was worked on behalf of the government by the German contractors, Lenz and Company.

In 1909, a branch was constructed to Karasburg in the south from a junction at Seeheim, to the west of Keetmanshoop. Between 1910 and 1912, the North-South Railway or Nord-Südbahn, which connected with the Südbahn at Keetmanshoop, was constructed jointly by the German Imperial and the German South West Africa governments from Windhoek via Mariental, at a cost of £2,000,000.

The original narrow gauge Swakopmund-Windhuk Staatsbahn or Nordbahn was regauged to Cape gauge from Windhoek to Karibib in 1911. Upon the completion of these three lines, Windhoek had rail links to two of the territory's ports. The extension from Prieska via Upington in the Union of South Africa to Karasburg in South West Africa was constructed by the Union government in 1914 and 1915, during the First World War.

== Manufacturer ==
In 1907, eight Cape Gauge tank locomotives with a 2-8-0 Consolidation type wheel arrangement were delivered to the Lüderitzbucht Eisenbahn by Orenstein & Koppel. They were numbered in the range from 1 to 8 and were all built in 1906. The first six of these locomotives were two-cylinder compound engines which were built to the Von Borries principles, the only compound locomotives of this design to serve in Southern Africa. The other two, numbers 7 and 8, were two-cylinder simple-expansion (simplex) engines.

A second batch of thirteen locomotives was delivered from the same manufacturer between 1907 and 1910, built between 1907 and 1909 and numbered in the ranges from 9 to 18 and 20 to 21. They were all two-cylinder simplex locomotives, identical to the last two of the first batch. A final two locomotives of the same type were delivered, both built in 1910 and numbered 51 and 52.

== Two-cylinder compound expansion ==
In a compound locomotive, steam is expanded in phases. After being expanded in a high-pressure cylinder and having then lost pressure and given up part of its heat, it is exhausted into a larger-volume low-pressure cylinder for secondary expansion, after which it is exhausted through the smokebox. By comparison, in the more usual arrangement of simple expansion, steam is expanded just once in any one cylinder before being exhausted through the smokebox.

A two-cylinder compound expansion locomotive using the Von Borries system of compounding has one high-pressure and one low-pressure cylinder. On the Eight-Coupled Tanks, the smaller high-pressure cylinder was on the right side of the engine and the bigger low-pressure cylinder on the left.

The Von Borries system consisted of a combined intercepting and starting valve which, when starting, automatically admitted boiler steam into the receiver pipe between the high- and low-pressure cylinders. When the high-pressure cylinder began to exhaust steam into the receiver pipe, the starting valve was automatically closed and normal compound working ensued. A Von Borries compound could not work as simplex at starting because the high-pressure cylinder exhausted into a closed receiver pipe under all conditions. In this respect, the Von Borries system differed essentially from four-cylinder compound systems for locomotives, in which the two high-pressure cylinders could be made to exhaust to atmosphere by means of a relief valve, operated from the cab by the driver.

== Characteristics ==
The second pair of coupled wheels had a total sideplay of 13/32 inch (10 millimetres), while the trailing coupled wheels had a sideplay of 1 inch (25 millimetres). The engines bore number plates on their smokebox sides, inscribed "LE" and the engine number. Both versions of the type were equipped with dust shields over the coupled wheels and valve gear to protect the moving parts from blown sand in the Namib desert.

== Service ==
The locomotives were placed in service on the line between Lüderitzbucht and Keetmanshoop and on the lines from the latter north to Windhoek and south to Karasburg. Since the radius of operation of a tank locomotive is limited by the capacity of its small on-board coal bunker, these locomotives often ran with a small auxiliary tender coupled behind to extend their range.

During the German South West Africa campaign in the First World War, the territory was taken over by the South African military. On 1 April 1922, all railways in the former German colony came under the administration of the South African Railways (SAR). Four of the simplex locomotives, numbers 10, 18, 20 and 21, survived to be taken onto the SAR roster. They retained their German colonial era engine numbers and were not classified by the SAR, but were simply referred to as the Eight-Coupled Tanks.

The Eight-Coupled Tanks remained in SAR service in South West Africa into the late 1930s.

== Works numbers ==
The works numbers, years built, engine numbers and known disposition of the Eight-Coupled Tanks are shown in the table.

GSWA Eight-Coupled Tanks
Works no.	Year	GSWA no.	1922
1870	1906	1	
1871	1906	2	
1872	1906	3	
1873	1906	4	
1874	1906	5	
1875	1906	6	
2069	1906	7	
2070	1906	8	
2356	1907	9	
2357	1907	10	SAR
2358	1907	11	
2359	1907	12	
2360	1907	13	
2361	1907	14	
2731	1908	15	
2732	1908	16	
2733	1908	17	
2734	1908	18	SAR
3182	1908	20	SAR
3183	1909	21	SAR
3184	1909	22	
4198	1910	51	
4199	1910	52	

== Illustration ==
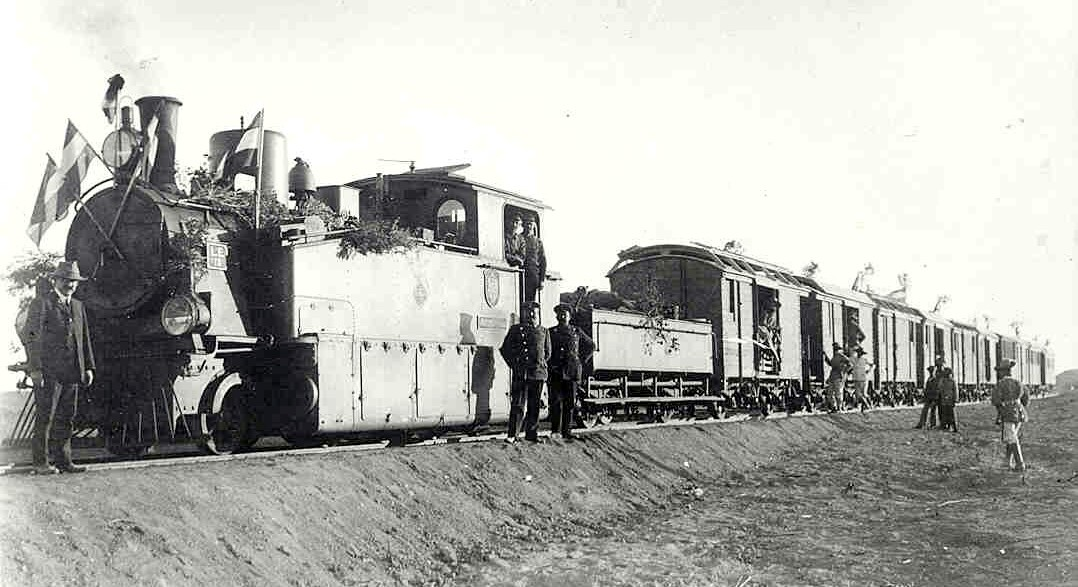
Eight-coupled tank and tender on inaugural train at Seeheim

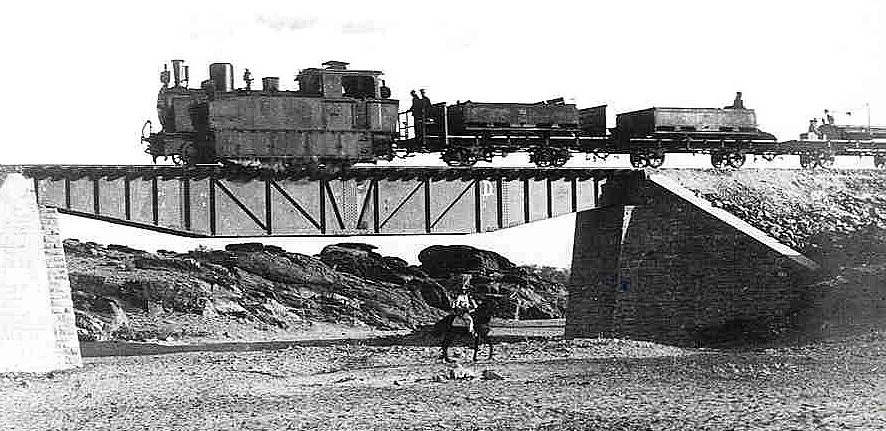
Eight-coupled tank on the Nord-Südbahn south of Windhoek

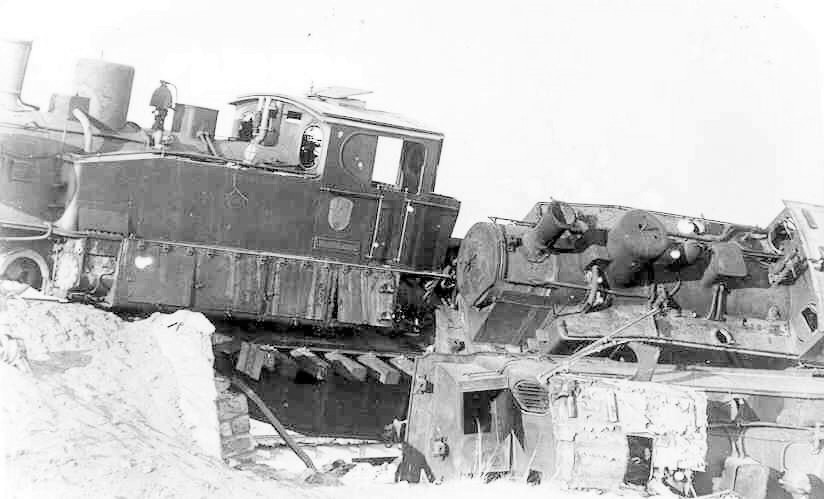
Eight-coupled tanks sabotaged by retreating German forces, c. 1915
