= Chapel of the Sisters of the Poor Clares, Bydgoszcz =

Catholic church in Bydgoszcz, Poland

Chapel of the Sisters of the Poor Clares
- Public chapel of the Poor Clares of Perpetual Adoration
- Polish: Kaplica sióstr Klarysek pw. Bożego Ciała w Bydgoszczy
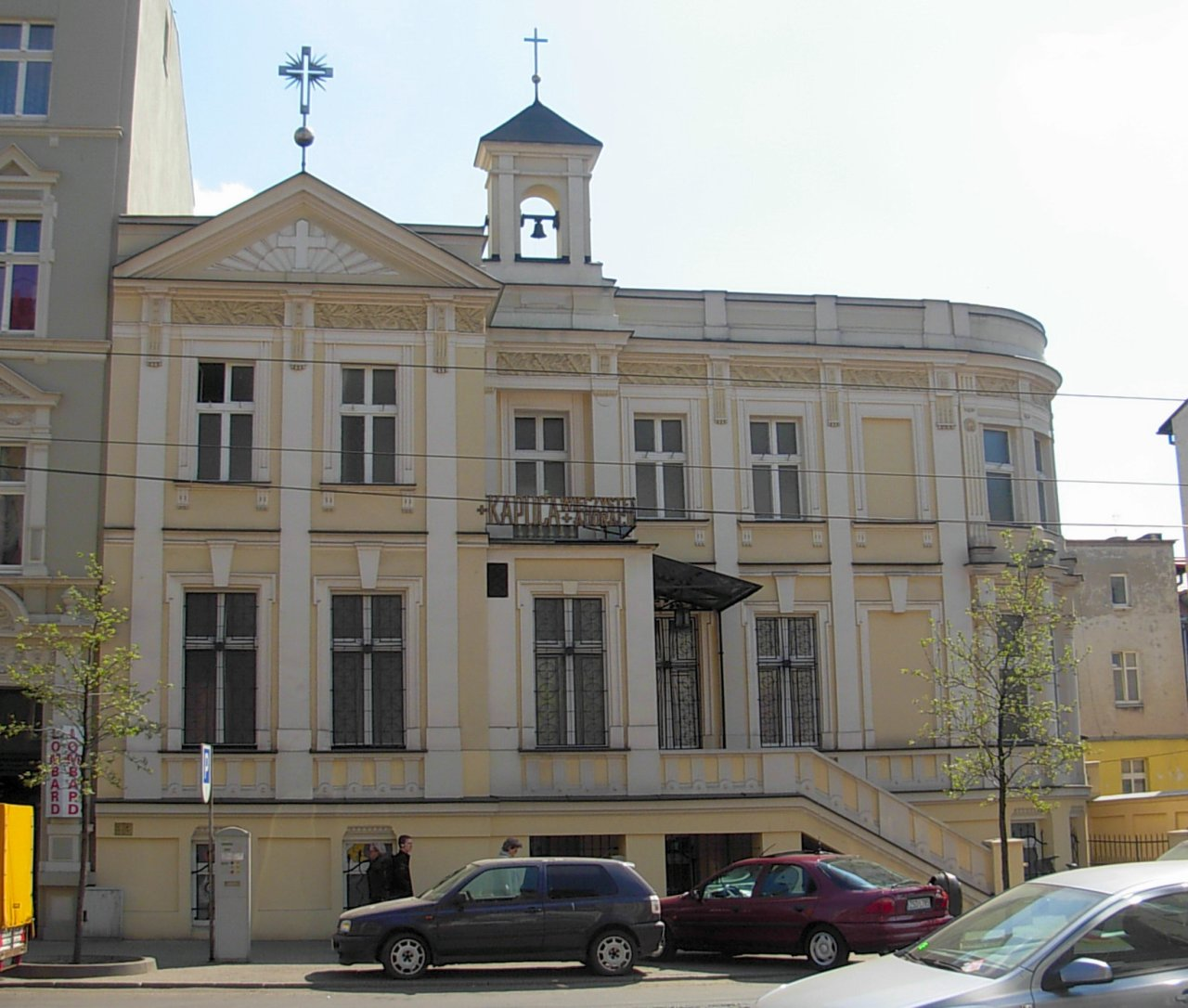
- View from Gdanska Street
- Chapel of the Sisters of the Poor Clares
- 53°7′51″N 18°0′32″E
- Location: 56 Gdańska street, Bydgoszcz
- Country: Poland
- Denomination: Catholic
- Churchmanship: Latin Church
- Website: (in Polish) bydgoszcz.klaryski.org

History
- Dedication: Eucharist
- Consecrated: 1925

Architecture
- Architectural type: Modern architecture
- Years built: 1900-1901

The Chapel of the Sisters of the Poor Clares is a church in downtown Bydgoszcz.

== Location ==
The church stands on eastern side of 56 Gdańska street.

== History ==
Predecessors of the Sisters of the Poor Clares in Bydgoszcz were the sisters of the Order of Poor Clares. They came to Bydgoszcz in 1615 and stayed until secularization of the Order by Prussian authorities in 1835. This congregation left several monastic buildings in the urban landscape of Bydgoszcz, still visible today:

- the hospital and shelter edifice, now operated by the Regional Museum department;
- the Gothic and renaissance Poor Clares' Church.

The sisters of the Poor Clares of Perpetual Adoration came to Bydgoszcz in 1925: it was not the congregation from the 17th to 19th centuries, but its younger branch, whose mission is a constant adoration of Jesus Christ through Blessed Sacrament of Eucharist.

The present building of the chapel was built in 1900–1901, designed as a residential villa belonging to Adolf and Emil Kolwitz. The Kolwitzs' were a notable Prussian merchant who had had a charitable foundation that helped supporting Diakonisek Hospital in Poznań. In Bydgoszcz, Adolf and Emil co-owned a warehouse, Ludwig Kolwitz, in Chodkiewicza street.

In 1925, the plot was sold to the congregation of the Poor Clares of Perpetual Adoration from Gniezno and construction started on the spot. The dedication of the chapel took place on 14 September 1925, during a ceremony chaired by Bishop Antoni Laubitz. Then started the perpetual Eucharistic adoration. The day-long adoration students attended school in Bydgoszcz and were residents of the city.

On 13 September 1939 Nazi troops entered the monastery, arrested the chaplain and locked the chapel. On 7 July 1941 the sisters were forced to leave the monastery, while Nazis had offices built in the premises. One of the sisters, Maria Kaminska Kaleta, was murdered in 1944.

After the liberation of Bydgoszcz, the chapel billeted Soviet troops from January to June 1945, then the building was initially allocated to the Tax Chamber office of Pomerania. However, thanks to the tireless efforts of the sisters, they regained back their building from 22 July 1945. The reorganization of the monastery after World War II ended on 16 February 1946, when lifetime adoration resumed inside the edifice.

On 29 September 1986 Cardinal Józef Glemp has consecrated the new altar in the chapel. The current public chapel is located in a former villa.

== Architecture ==
The initial building was built in the style of the early modernism with elements of neo-classicism. In 1925, during the reconstruction, the interior has been decorated to fit chapel's requirements, and the facade has been adorned with a small cross and a bell. On 22 November 1953 the image of Our Lady of Perpetual Help by Father Kazimierz Hołda was unveiled.

The pipe organ was built by the organ-building company Detlef Kleuker, likely as a home instrument. It was installed in its current location by Michał Klepacki.

== Gallery ==
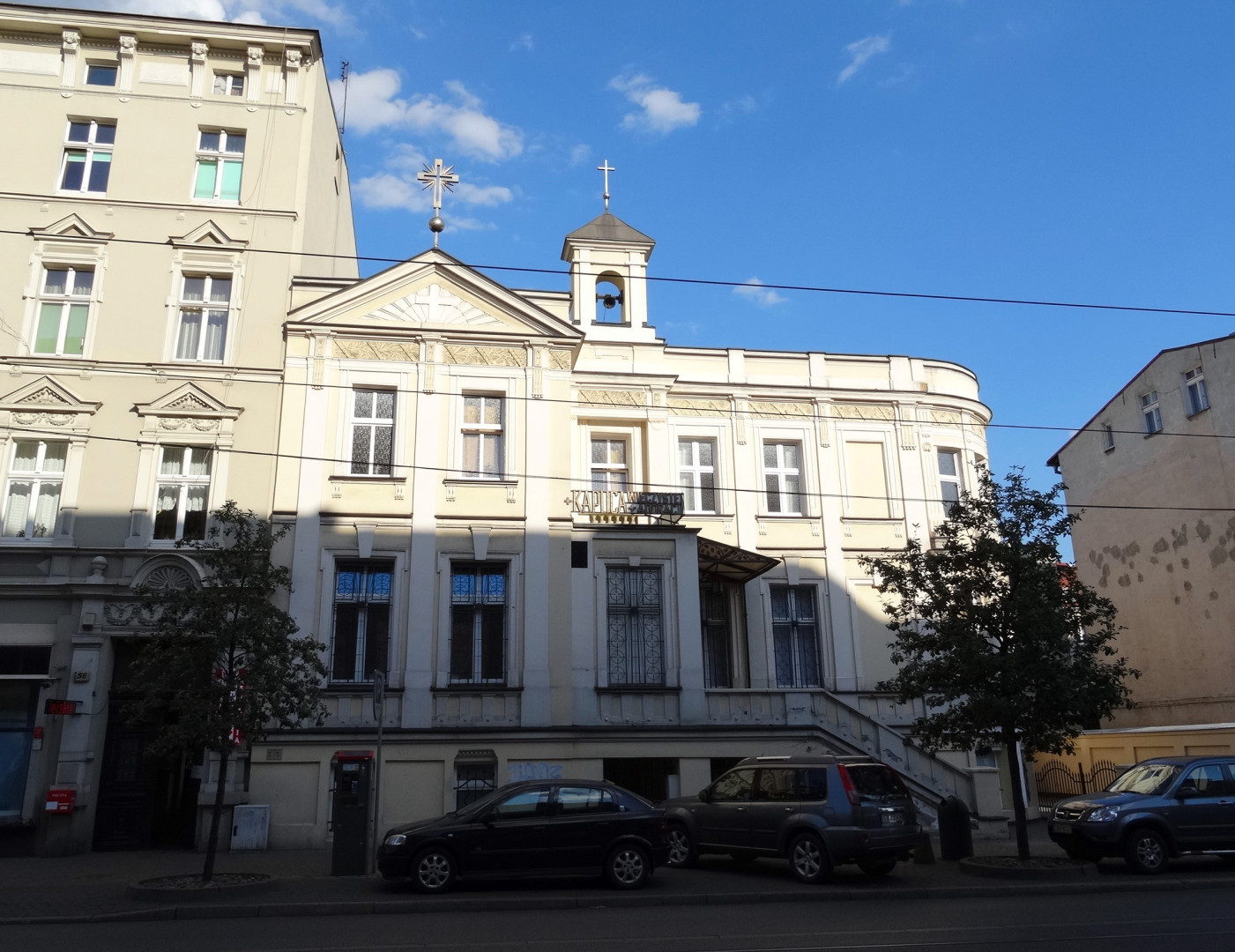
The chapel from the street

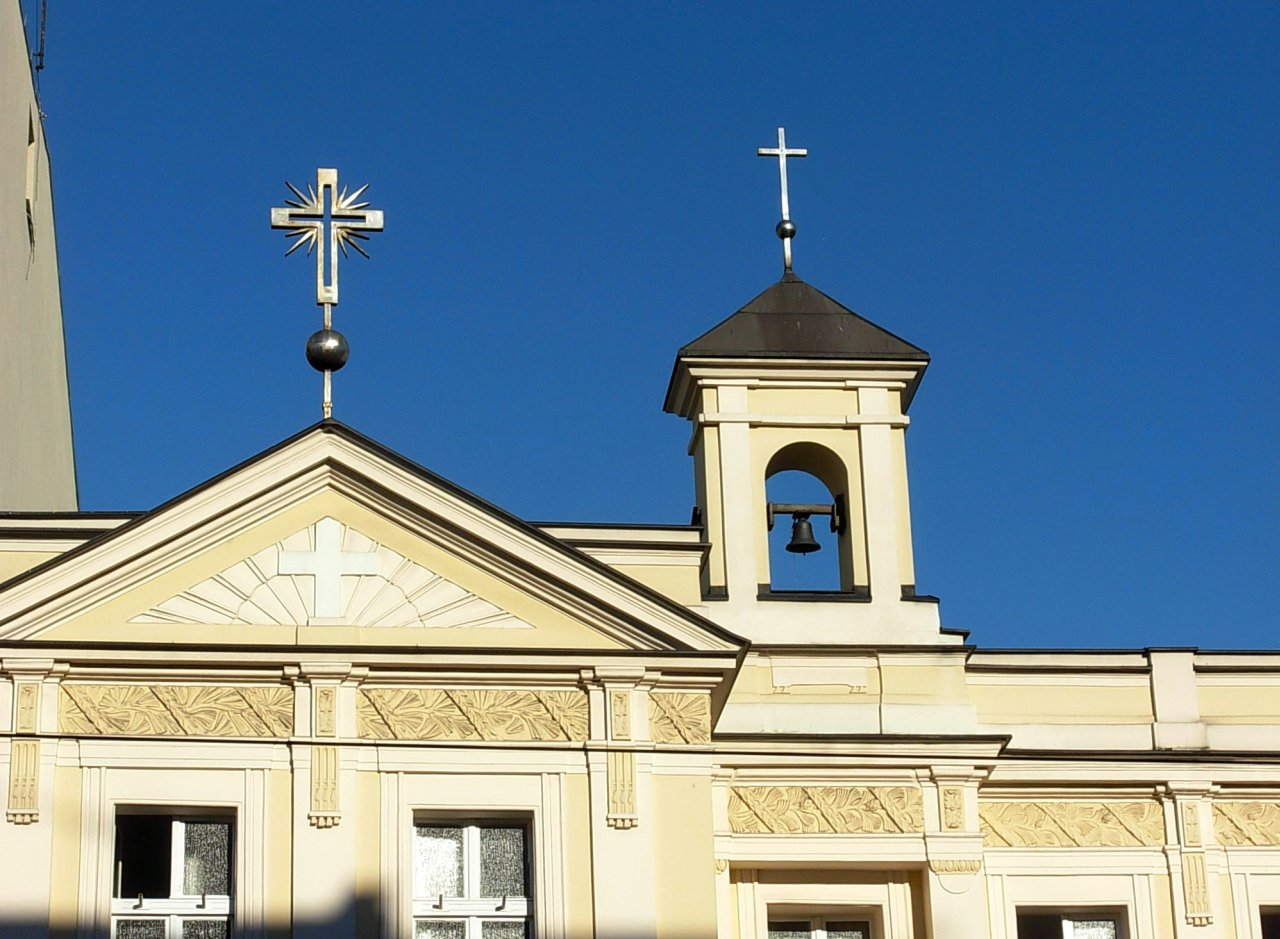
Detail on the top of the facade

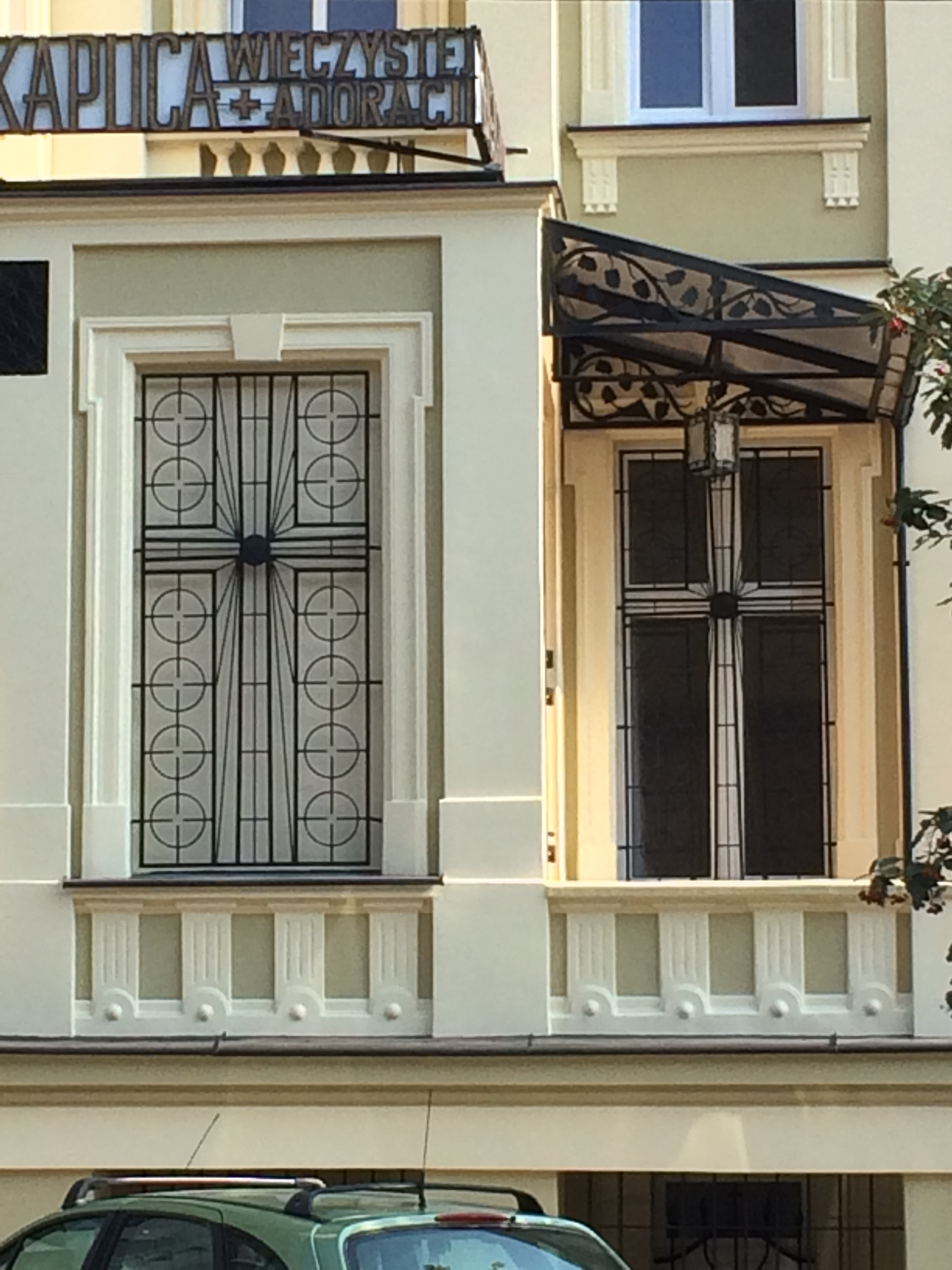
Facade detail

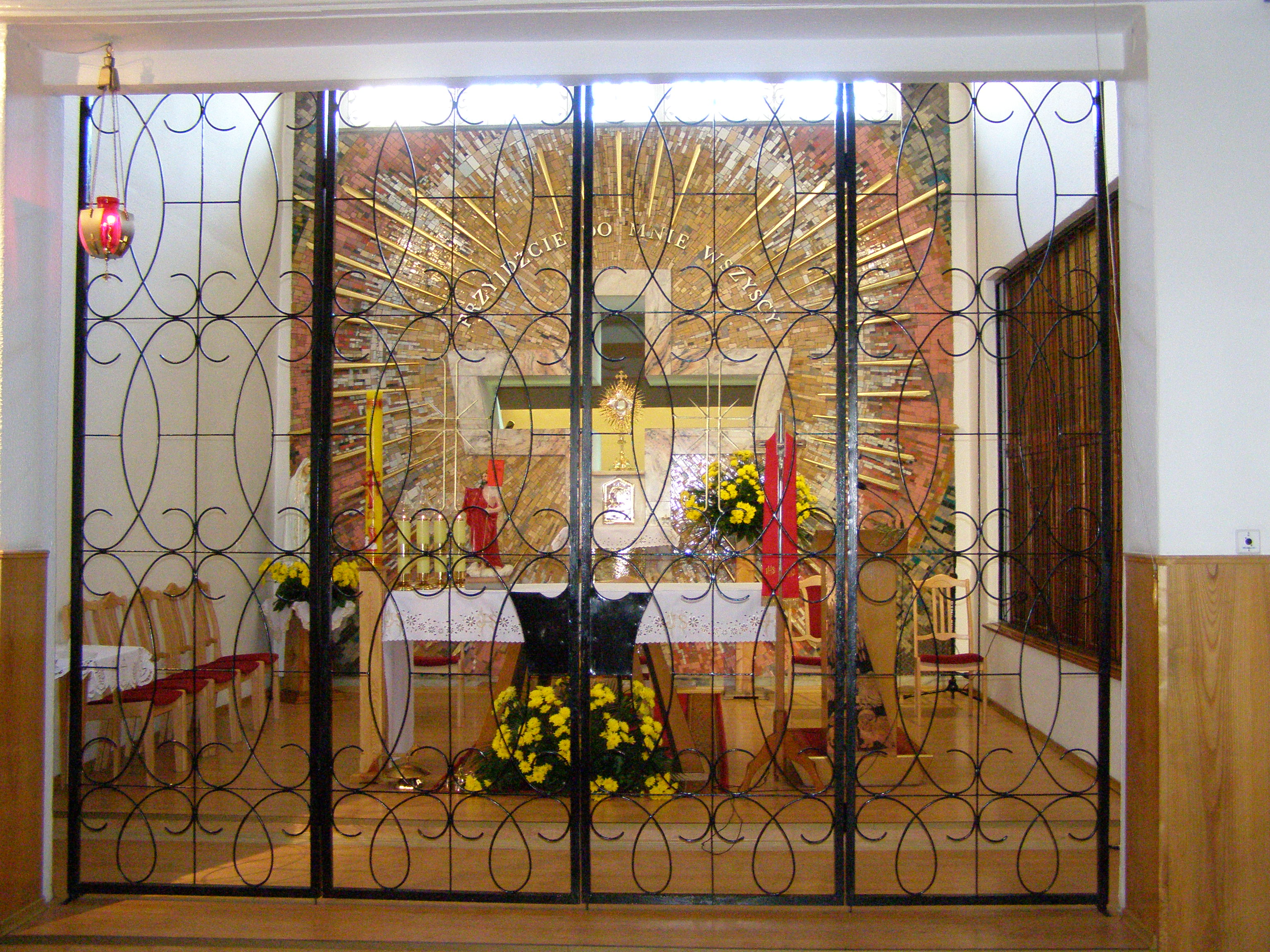
Interior

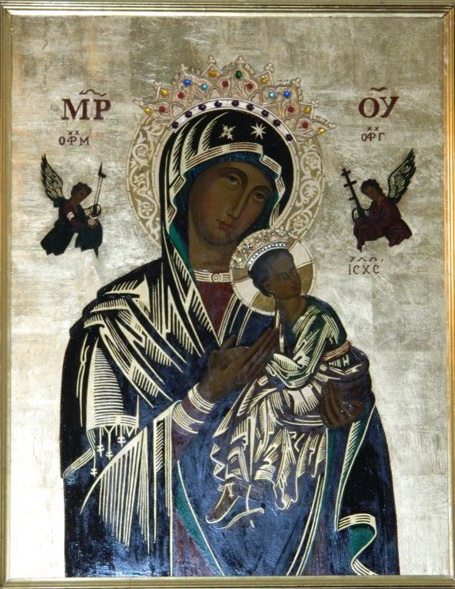
Our Lady of Perpetual Help

== See also ==
- Bydgoszcz
- Poor Clares of Perpetual Adoration
- Poor Clares' Church, Bydgoszcz
- Gdanska Street in Bydgoszcz
- (in Polish) Downtown district in Bydgoszcz

== Bibliography ==
- (in Polish) (in Polish) Pawęzka, Zofia (2001). Siostry Klaryski. Kalendarz Bydgoski. Bydgoszcz: Towarzystwo Miłośników Miasta Bydgoszczy.
- (in Polish) Praca zbiorowa (2003). Ulica Gdańska w Bydgoszczy – przewodnik historyczny. Bydoszcz: Wojewódzki Ośrodek Kultury w Bydgoszczy.
