= Konrad Pałubicki =

Polish musicologist and composer (1910–1992)

Konrad Józef Pałubicki
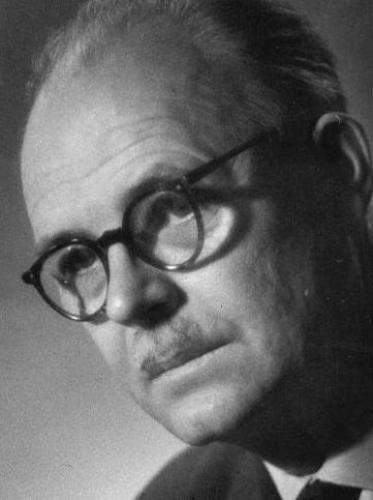
- Konrad Józef Pałubicki
- Born: 10 March 1910; Dziembówko, German Empire
- Died: 22 October 1992 (aged 82); Gdańsk, Poland
- Resting place: Nowofarny cemetery Bydgoszcz
- Occupations: Musicologist, pedagogue, composer
- Known for: Bydgoszcz hymn
- Awards

Konrad Józef Pałubicki (1910–1992) was a Polish composer, musicologist, teacher, cultural activist and animator in Gdańsk and Bydgoszcz. He created the hymn of Bydgoszcz and taught at the Academy of Music in Gdańsk and the Institute of Music Education of the Higher Pedagogical School in Bydgoszcz (today's Kazimierz Wielki University in Bydgoszcz).

== Biography ==
=== Early life ===
Konrad was born on 16 March 1910 in Dziembówko, a village near Chodzież. He was the son of Wanda Née Wyrwicka and Franciszek, a railway official. His mother was a teacher and played the piano; she instilled in her son a love of music, literature and theater.

By the end of World War I, he moved with his parents to live in Bydgoszcz. There he attended the State High School of Humanities, today the High Seminary of Bydgoszcz Diocese at 18 Grodzka Street. At the age of 17, he became interested in music and started taking private piano lessons from Magdalena Bylczyńska, a pianist from Lviv who settled in Bydgoszcz in 1923 to teach at the Conservatory of Music.

Thanks to a scholarship holder from the Directorate of Railways in Gdańsk, Pałubicki then studied music at the Adam Mickiewicz University in Poznań. In June 1937, he received a master's degree in philosophy of musicology. Concurrently, he graduated from Jan Skrzydlewski's (1867–1943) piano class at the Wielkopolska Music School, while as a private he was learning music theory and composition with Stanisław Bolesław Paradowski at the Academy of Music, Ignacy Jan Paderewski in Poznań.

=== Second World War ===
From 10 September 1937 to 1 September 1939, he taught singing at the State Junior High School and Secondary School in Jarocin. He had been leading the orchestra and the choir in this city until the outbreak of World War II.

He could avoid Nazi repressions aimed at Polish intelligentsia in Pomerania as he was not listed as a teacher in Bydgoszcz school boards but in Poznań's. He nonetheless left Bydgoszcz in a hurry to reach Kutno, then Kraków.

During the Occupation of Poland (1939–1945), Konrad survived by giving lessons in Latin, history, mathematics, physics and piano. In 1942, he moved to Warsaw to receive private lessons with Kazimierz Sikorski in music theory and composition and with Zbigniew Drzewiecki for piano. During this period (1942–1945), he started to compose and wrote several piano pieces and songs.

=== Bydgoszcz years ===
Pałubicki returned to Bydgoszcz in 1945 and on May 1, he took up the position of clerk and then head of the music department at the Department of Culture and Art (Polish: Wydział Nauk o Kulturze i Sztuce) of the Pomeranian Voivodeship. He actively participated in the rebirth of the city's musical life.

He was particularly active in the Paderewski Musical Society and co-created the Bydgoszcz Polish Radio Symphony Orchestra (Polish: Orkiestra Symfoniczna Polskiego Radia w Bydgoszczy) as well as the Pomeranian Philharmonic Symphony Orchestra. Additionally, he had been teaching composition and music theory at the Municipal Conservatory of Music; from 1947 to 1961, Konrad worked also at the Secondary Music School, known to be a demanding teacher.

Apart from teaching, he was very active in the civil society. In 1946, he participated in the Committee for the Celebration of the 600th anniversary of Bydgoszcz city rights: the event, in addition to a Polish Music Festival, included a plenary meeting of the Musical Education Program Committee at the Ministry of Culture and Art.

For the occasion, the 600th anniversary council of the city of Bydgoszcz organized a competition for a city hymn: out of 26 candidates, the jury chose Pałubicki's composition based on Kashubian motifs. As a result, the Bydgoszcz bugle call would be sounded daily three times from the tower of the Poor Clares Church on Gdańsk Street.

Konrad participated with Felicja Krysiewiczowa in the establishment of the Opera Studio, the predecessor of the Opera Nova. He was a member of the program committee of the international festival Musica Antiqua Europae Orientalis in Bydgoszcz. Finally, he became involved in organizing International Summer Courses in the Lubostroń Palace which ran concurrently with the festival.

=== Gdańsk years ===
In 1950, Konrad Pałubicki started some stints in the Tricity; he worked initially at the State Higher School of Music of Sopot and then at the Academy of Music in Gdańsk.

There, he took different positions:

- dean of the Faculty of Composition and Music Theory (1952–1972)
- head of the Department of Composition and Music Theory (1961–1972)
- vice-rector (1971–1972)

During this period, he kept cooperating with the Bydgoszcz scientific and musical community, performing lectures at the Kazimierz Wielki University. Together with Andrzej Szwalbe, in 1958 he joined the Bydgoszcz Scientific Society which he co-founded, and served as a chairman of the Faculty of Humanities from 1958 to 1968. As a scientific editor, he also provided advice for some issues of the local paper From the history of Polish music in Pomerania and Kujawy (Polish: Z dziejów muzyki polskiej na Pomorzu i Kujawach).

In 1968, he transferred to Gdańsk while still maintaining active in Bydgoszcz (teaching theory and composition at the Institute of Music Education of the university). At the Academy of Music in Gdańsk, he led the Faculty of musical composition and theory.

At that time, he was a member of the Council of Higher Artistic Education at the Ministry of Culture and Art. From 1969 on, Konrad chaired the commission of experts for the reform of higher music schools. He also authored many theoretical works, scripts and articles, including a 2-volume work titled Contemporary compositional techniques (Polish: Współczesne techniki kompozytorskie).

He died on 22 October 1992, in Gdańsk. He was buried in Nowofarny Cemetery in Bydgoszcz.

== Musical compositions ==
Pałubicki's compositional work was guided by the logic of the formal course of the piece; he spoke in a contemporary language, avoiding extreme avant-garde. His musical legacy includes primarily symphonic works, concerts, instrumental works, songs and chamber music. He wrote about 50 compositions during the so-called "Bydgoszcz period", including:

- orchestral compositions (Groteska symfoniczna and Witraże- triptyk)
- concerts for piano, violin, cello or flute
- vocal-instrumental works (cantata Mój świat, songs for voice with piano and instruments, Muzyka i poezja with recitation of Mayakovsky's and Różewicz's poems)
- chamber pieces (string quartets for violin, cello and flute)
- compositions for solo instruments or solo with orchestra (i.e. Muzyka na głos i orkiestrę)
- stage works (Chimery - ballet). Composed in 1964, it was performed as a symphonic work and as a ballet music for the Opera Nova. This work was displayed part of a triptych prepared for the Bydgoszcz Music Festival in 1964 under the name Polish Ballets (Polish: Balety polskie)

At the time of his compositions, Konrad created works for specific performers including pianists Lucjan Galon, Jerzy Sulikowski, Krystyna Suchecka and cellist Roman Suchecki. Among his major creations performed in Bydgoszcz, one can cite Koncert skrzypcowy (Violin Concerto) (1951) and Concertino na fortepian i orkiestrę (Concerto for piano and orchestra) (1956). In 1992, Pałubicki attended his last composer's concert at the Pomeranian Philharmonic, a few months before his death.

From 1954 onwards, he had been organizing scientific sessions devoted to the works of 20th century composers (1955 Karol Szymanowski, 1963 Claude Debussy, 1965 Béla Bartók, 1973 Tadeusz Szeligowski). This tradition continues to this day.

Several of his works were awarded during national competitions:

- Gdańsk Ballad (Polish: Ballada gdańska), 2nd prize at the competition celebrating the 25th anniversary of the liberation of Gdańsk (1969)
- Sonata for oboe and piano (Polish: Sonata na obój i fortepian), 1st prize at the National Competition of Chamber Music Composers (1971)
- Composition for piano solo (Polish: Kompozycja na fortepian solo), distinction at the 9th Polish Piano Festival in Słupsk (1975)

== Personal life ==
Konrad Pałubicki was married to Janina née Bazarnik, a widow. They had no children together, but he adopted his wife's children from her previous marriage, Marian (born 1946) and Jolanta (born 1949).

Konrad was the oldest of five children:

- Albin (born 1920) died just after passing his high school final exams
- Henryk (born 1925) disappeared during the Second World War
- Rajmund (1929–1945), a scout shot by stray bullets from a Soviet soldier during the May Day march in Bydgoszcz Polonia Stadium
- Elżbieta (born 1915) who lived with Konrad in Bydgoszcz. They inhabited the apartment of pianist Magdalena Bylczyńska, Elżbieta being under the care of Magdalena's family until her death in 1966

== Orders and commemorations ==
- 1955 – Medal of the 10th anniversary of the Polish People's Republic
- 1957 – Golden Cross of Merit
- 1964 – Knight's Cross of the Order of Polonia Restituta
- 1978 – Medal of the National Education Commission
- 1984 – Medal of the 40th Anniversary of the People's Republic of Poland
- Badge of honor Meritorious for the city of Bydgoszcz
- Badge of honor Meritorious for the Bydgoszcz Voivodeship

In 1957, Konrad was awarded the academic title of docent and in 1967 the title of associate professor. He was an honorary member of the Music Society of Bydgoszcz, a long-time member of the Union of Polish Composers and the president of the Gdańsk union of composers.

In the 1970s and the 1980s, he participated in the Doctoral Study Committee at the Faculty of Composition, Music Theory and Conducting at the Academy of Music in Warsaw.

Konrad Pałubicki was portrayed as Professor Pałuba-Pałubiński in Maciej Dęboróg-Bylczyński's novel Wygnańcy Ewy (Exiles of Eve), published in 2016.

== See also ==
- Bydgoszcz
- Pomeranian Philharmonic
- Music Schools Group, Bydgoszcz
- Opera Nova Bydgoszcz
- Intelligenzaktion Pommern

== Bibliography ==
- (in Polish) Krassowski, Janusz (1997). Akademia Muzyczna im. St. Moniuszki w Gdańsku : 1947–1997 [Academy of Music St. Moniuszko in Gdańsk: 1947–1997] (in Polish). Gdańsk: Akademii Muzycznej.
- (in Polish) Krassowski, Janusz (1980). Kompozytorzy gdańscy / szkice [Gdańsk composers / sketches] (in Polish). Gdańsk: Gdańskie Towarzystwo Przyjaciół Sztuki Gdańsk.
- (in Polish) Błażejewski, Stanisław; Kutta, Janusz; Romaniuk, Marek (1996). Bydgoski Słownik Biograficzny. Tom III [Bydgoszcz biography dictionary] (in Polish). Gdańsk: Kujawsko Pomorskie Towarzystwo Kulturalne Gdańsk. pp. 109–111. ISBN 83-85327-32-0.
- (in Polish) Dęboróg-Bylczyński, Maciej (2007). Nutami zamiast słów. 60-lecie Akademii Muzycznej w Gdańsku [With notes instead of words. 60th anniversary of the Academy of Music in Gdańsk] (in Polish). Gdańsk: Pomerania. pp. 30–31.
- (in Polish) Krassowski, Janusz (1998). Pałubicki Konrad Józef (1910–1992). Słownik biograficzny Pomorza Nadwiślańskiego [Pałubicki Konrad Józef (1910–1992). Biographical dictionary of Vistula Pomerania] (in Polish). Gdańsk: Wydawnictwo Interpress. pp. 226–227531.
- (in Polish) Prus, Zdzisław; Weber, Alicja; Kuczma, Rajmund (2004). Bydgoski leksykon muzyczny [Bydgoszcz musical lexicon] (in Polish). Bydgoszcz: Kujawsko-Pomorskie Towarzystwo Kulturalne. pp. 432–433.
- (in Polish) Pietrzykowska, Marlena (2010). Poezja w twórczości Konrada Pałubickiego. Ars inter Culturas nr 1 [Poetry in Konrad Pałubicki's works. Ars inter Culturas nr 1] (PDF) (in Polish). Bydgoszcz: Uniwersytet Pomorski w Słupsku. pp. 167–175.
