= Poor Clares' Church, Bydgoszcz =

Catholic Church, Bydgoszcz, Poland, 16th century

Poor Clares' Church
- Order of Saint Clare's Church in Bydgoszcz
- Church of the Assumption in Bydgoszcz
- Polish: Kościół Klarysek pw. Wniebowzięcia Najświętszej Maryi Panny w Bydgoszczy
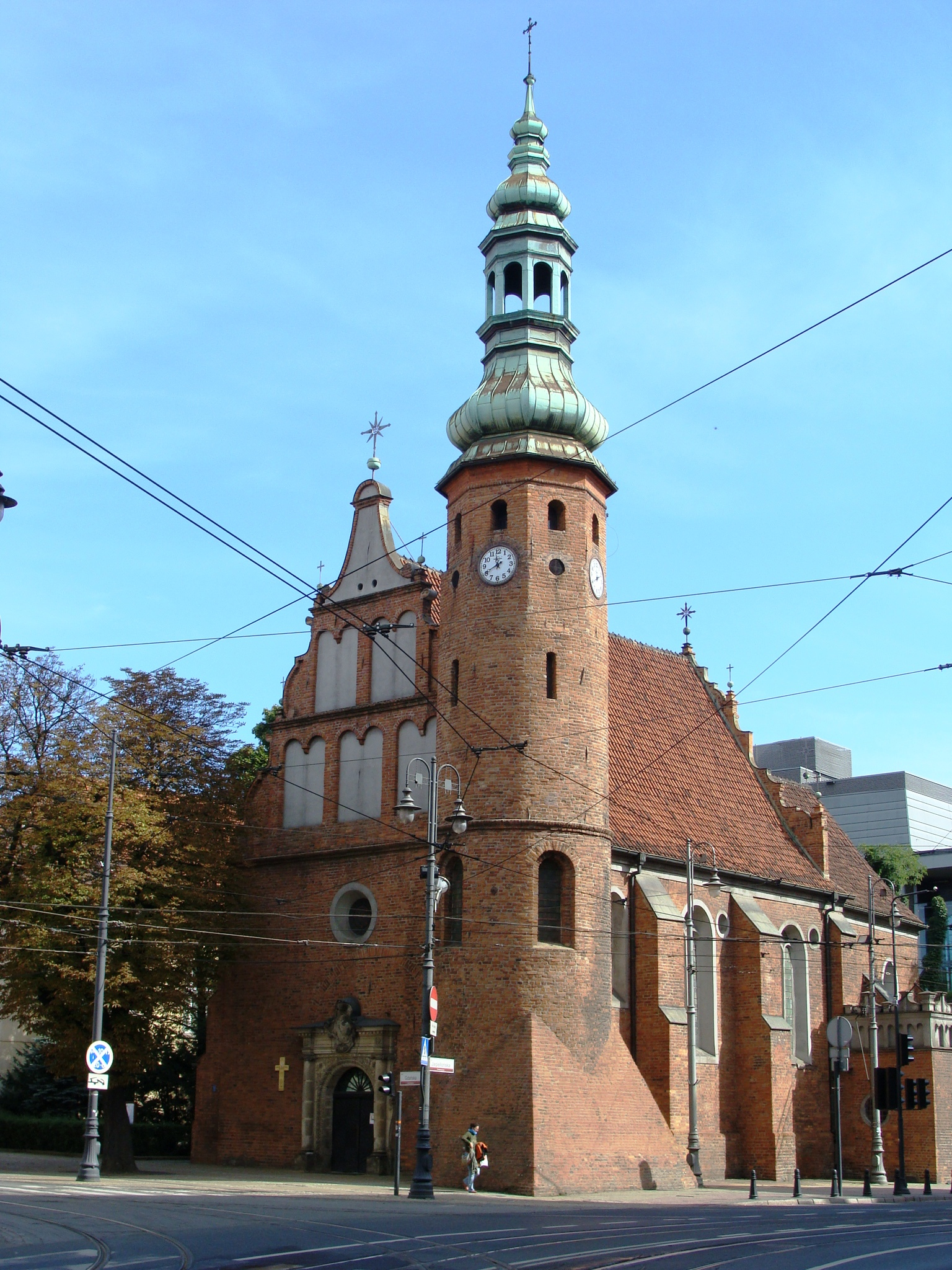
- Poor Clares' Church or Church of the Assumption in Bydgoszcz
- Poor Clares' Church
- 53°7′27.7″N 18°0′11″E
- Location: Bydgoszcz
- Country: Poland
- Denomination: Roman Catholic

History
- Status: Church
- Founded: 1582
- Dedication: Assumption of Mary
- Dedicated: 21 September 1645

Architecture
- Functional status: Active
- Heritage designation: Nr.601229 (reg.A/209), 31.03.1931
- Completed: 1645

Specifications
- Materials: Brick

The Church of the Poor Clares dedicated to Assumption of the Blessed Virgin Mary (initially dedicated to the Holy Spirit, St. Adalbert, St.Clare and St. Barbara) is an historical church in Gdańska Street, Bydgoszcz, Poland.

== Location ==
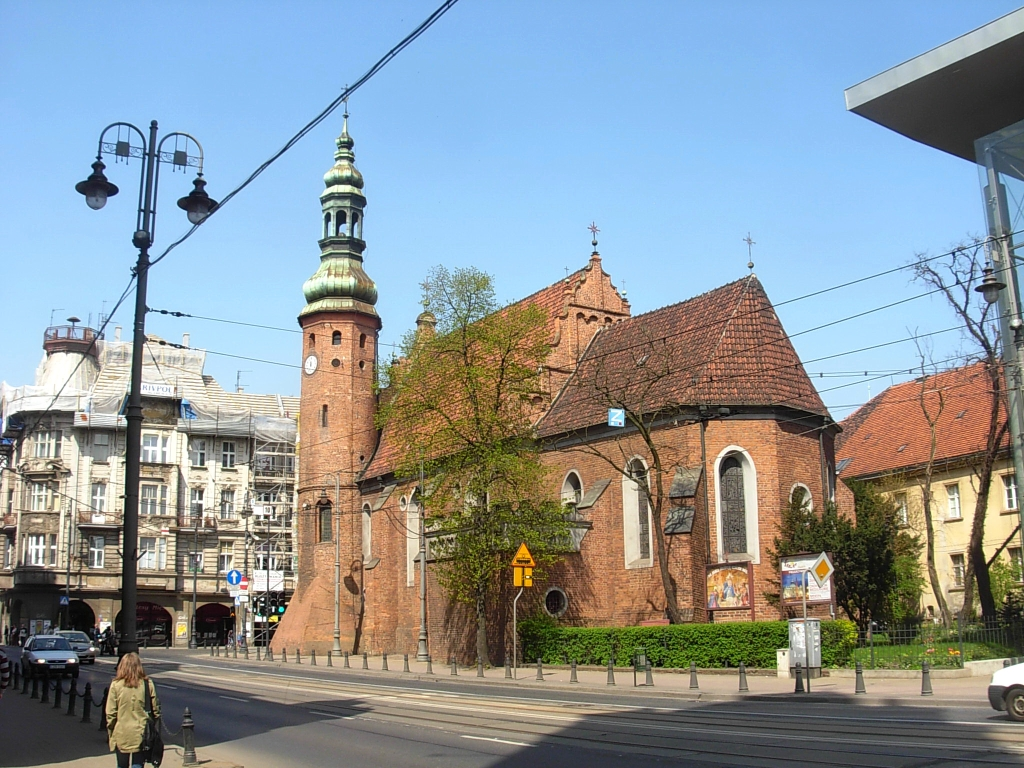
Church seen from Focha Street

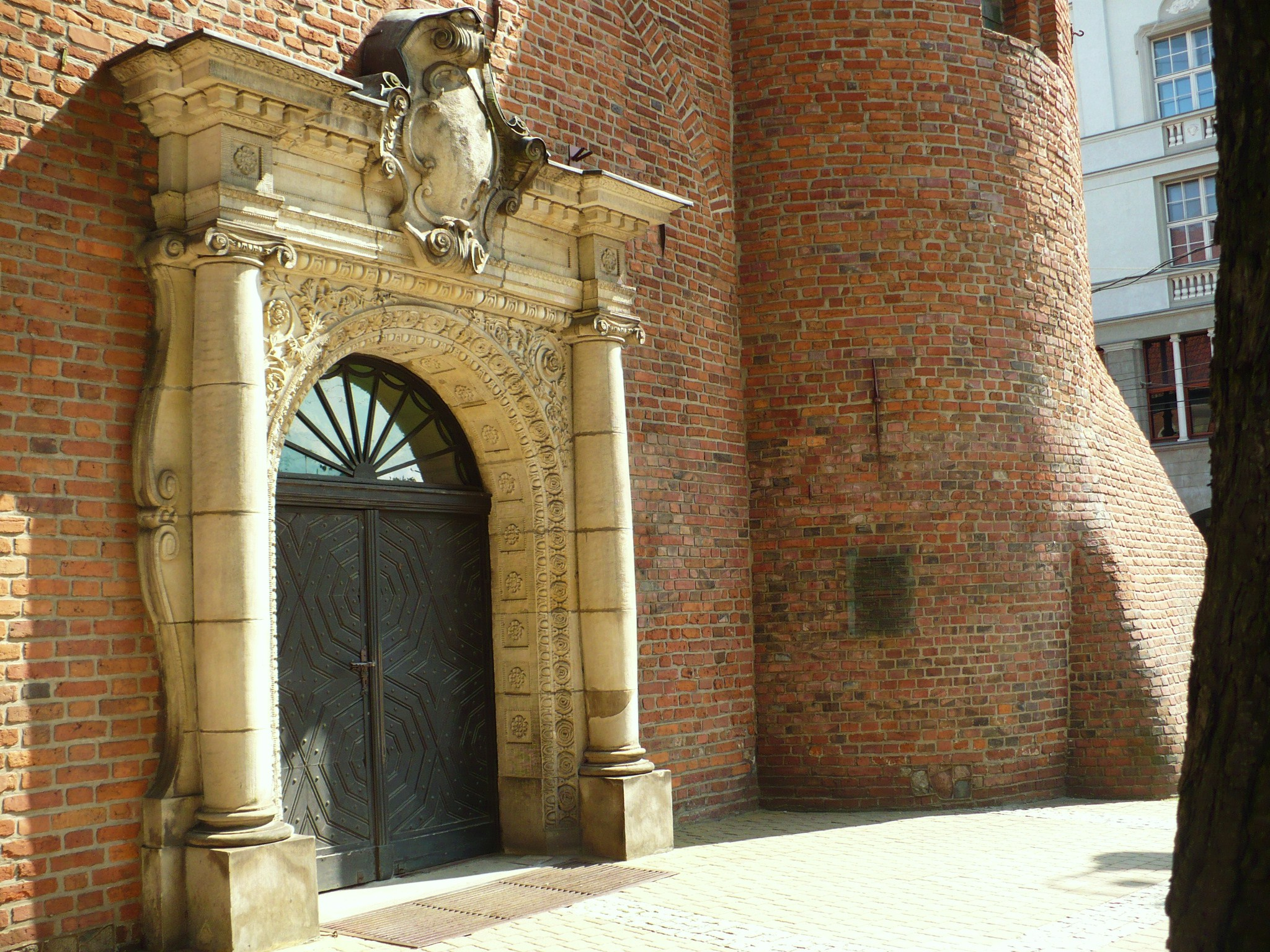
Gate

The church stands in a prominent location at the junction of the Gdańska Street, the Mostowa Street, Jagiellońska street and Focha Street in downtown Bydgoszcz.

== History ==
=== Origins of the church ===
The origins of the church are associated with the arrival in 1615 of the sisters of the Order of Saint Clare in Bydgoszcz. On the place chosen by the Poor Clares stood a hospital church (Kościół stary Św. Ducha w Bydgoszczy) made of oak, dedicated to the Holy Spirit and erected on citizens donations in 1448. The decision to build a brick church on the site was made in 1522, but the actual work didn't start until 1582.

The construction of the new church used the superstructure of the hospital church standing here. Building the walls took approximately 8 years (until 1590), the interiors were completed in 1602. From 1602 to 1618, the construction was put on hold. It was only in 1615, after the establishment of the Convent of the Poor Clares in Bydgoszcz and a donation by the city council in 1616 of a land on the outskirts of Gdansk, that things really started. First were constructed the nave, then the former Holy Spirit's church became the base of the new church's choir. As a result, the new entrance of the church, much larger than the former one, was an ogival arch, joining the choir to the nave.

Over the years, the church has been enlarged according to the needs of the convent: hence the superstructure of the sacristy in the choir. In 1636, an altar funded by Anna Modlibogowa, from Kruszyn, was installed. The consecration of the enlarged church of the Holy Spirit took place on 21 September 1645, the ceremony was chaired by suffragan bishop Piotr Mieszkowski from Włocławek, assisted by the abbot of the Cistercian abbey of Koronowo. New patrons were then added, St. Wojciech, St. Clare and Saint Barbara. In addition, inside the altar were sealed relics of:

- Saint Wojciech,
- Saint Barbara,
- Rufin and Perpetua of Carthage (Christian martyrs).

In 1646, the church was adorned in the priests Chapel with a rich, Renaissance attic and a crypt for nuns, both offered by the mayor of Bydgoszcz, Wojciech Łochowski; this chapel still exists today. New elements in the interior have been put inside: in 1651, a grid iron separating the chancel from the nave, and in 1661 a tombstone plaque of Sophia Smoszewska -founder of sisters' monastery in Bydgoszcz.

The monastery and its church had at this time a strategic location, on the road from the Carmelite monastery (now gone) in the North continuing to the bridge leading to the Old City of Bydgoszcz. This fact explained that around 1740, a multi storey tower topped with a baroque spire has been erected in the south-west corner of the nave. Slits on the lower levels were adjusted to allow the use of firearms.

In 1730, funds donated by Helen Zkoraczewską Złotnicka helped to rebuild all the windows in the church, and in 1746 a porch with 2 entrances was added (no traces today).

=== Church as seen from a visit in 1760 ===
In a detailed visit made in 1760, Livonian bishop Antoni Kazimierz Ostrowski reported that the church was all in brick and covered with Polish tiles. Adjacent were two sacristies for priests and sisters, a porch church and a tower covered with a dome. On the tower were suspended two silver bells and another in the flèche. Inside, there were two galleries and the nave was covered with decorated, polychrome wooden ceiling, which can are still be admired today.

In the chancel was a large, gilded altar with two paintings: the coronation of Virgin Mary at the bottom and St. Francis of Assisi at the top. Besides the main one, there were seven side altars dedicated to:

- Saint Ursula - altar from 1736. This was associated with the St. Ursula brotherhood, which in 1751 got permission to celebrate prayers, on certain days of the year, giving indulgences for the deliverance of souls from purgatory,
- The Holy Spirit - the original patron of the temple,
- Catherine of Siena,
- Blessed Virgin Mary from Częstochowa,
- Holy Guardian Angels - they were associated with the church brotherhood,
- Saint Joseph,
- St. Anthony.

The church had a large gallery supported by vaults, on the walls were 21 windows and 34 images. The chancel had a floor in flagstones, and the nave in bricks.

At the high altar are two tombs, Sophia Smoszewska's and Rozdrażewskiej's (her niece). In the crypt under Catherine of Siena's altar is the tomb of monastery's abbess and below the priests sacristy are tombs of the other nuns.

Items observed included: church bells, missals, books, monstrance, chalices, cruets, crosses, candlesticks, lamps, dresses, votives, chasubles, covers, albs, surplices and belts.

=== The period of the Prussian partition ===
In 1835, with the secularization of both monastery and church, Poor Clares sisters were resettled to Gniezno. The buildings was transferred to the hands of the city, and by decision of Eduard Heinrich von Flottwell, governor of Grand Duchy of Posen, church worship was to be abandoned and the interior to be used for other purposes.

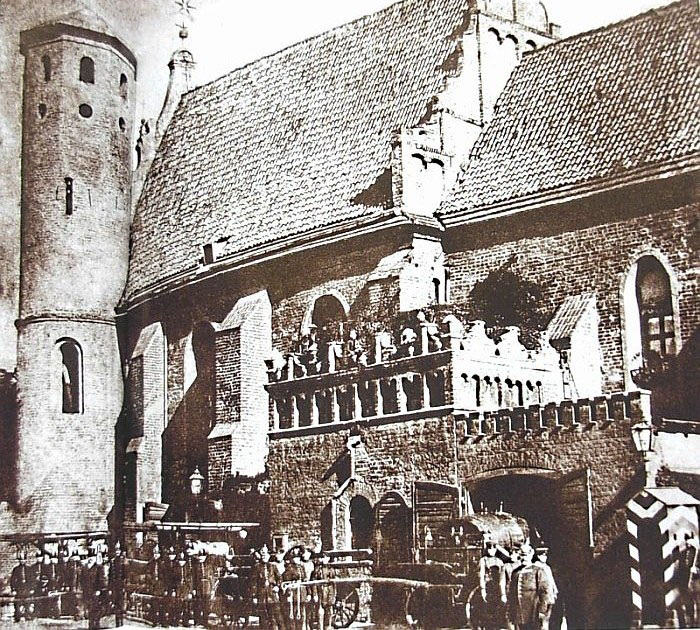
Poor Clares' Church Bydgoszcz in 1888

Interior objects were dispersed among other churches:

- Main altar was transferred to a church in Sypniewo;
- One side altar was sent to Osielsko;
- Gate iron grille was moved to Starofarny Cemetery in Bydgoszcz, then moved back in the late 1970s;
- One of the side altars and Sophia Smoszewska's tombstone was moved to St. Martin and St. Nicholas Cathedral.

The secularised building of the church was used for diverse purposes. Initially city authorities installed there the municipal scales. Then an alcoholic beverages store was installed: part of the western chancel (with the former gallery) was isolated and refitted, an opening was made through the southern wall for the warehouse.

In June 1848, a severe storm knocked down the metal structure of the tower. A year later it was replaced by a lower roof. In June 1863 the building housed the Cleaning Department of Streets and latrines. Then, in 1875, in the building was installed a fire station, with space for firefighting cars and stables. Successive refittings strongly interfered in the primary structure of architectural interiors and exteriors. Western and southern walls of the nave had large holes cut for gates, large opening doors were created in a southern chapel, and to the east was built a low building with a flat pseudo merloned roof. Inside, significant renovations were performed:

- Arches were bricked,
- chancel was divided into two floors, creating an apartment upstairs for commander,
- Part of window openings were liquidated, some reduced,
- Opening window of the Chapel Łochowski became a door, leading to a decorated terrace with a view on the roof,
- Two-storey sacristy was separated by an indoor roof, and converted as a stairwell,
- The nave was adapted to ease movements and transport.

In 1888, the Historical Society of Netze District in Bydgoszcz made available the chancel for exhibition purposes. The exhibition of historical collections started in 1890, and imposed an external stairwell to be erected on northern wall. In the following years, the Historical Society of Netze District planned and systematically carried out conservation actions. Around 1900 was built a ceiling with joists in the nave, and 1901 a clock with two dial plates was mounted on the tower and a Baroque pink cupola reconstructed. Initially, the 1897 project should take a modest form but eventually urban architect Carl Meyer, with the help of Prussian conservator J. Kothe, changed the design, using 1844-drawing of Ferdinand von Quastof. Once completed, the church was the pride of Bromberg city center.

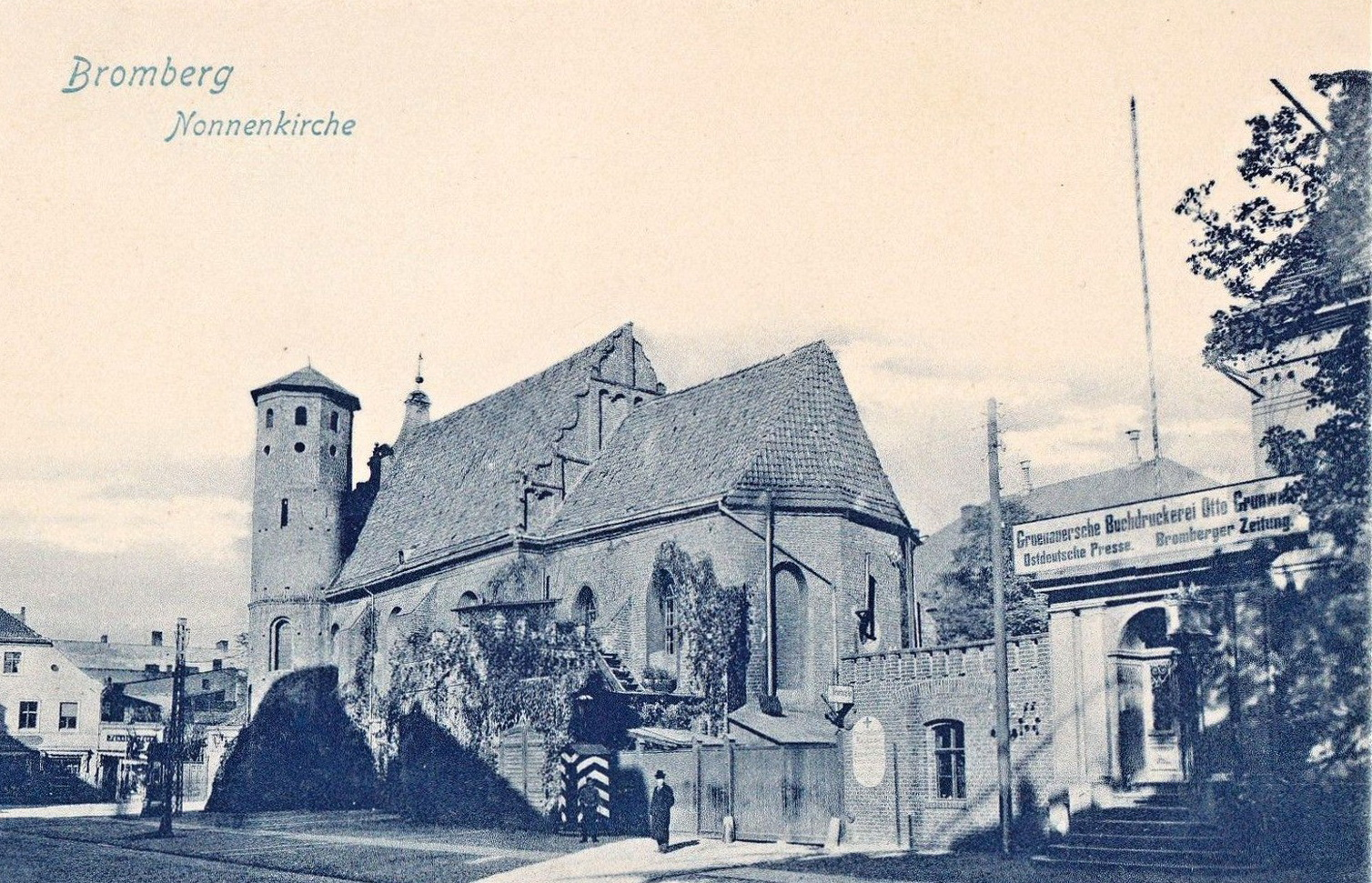
Poor Clares' Church in 1897

In 1911, the Fire Brigade received new headquarters in Bydgoszcz and moved out. Idea was raised to transform the ex- sacred buildings into a prison: the members of the Historical Society of Netze District strived to grant sanctuary for museum purposes. During World War I, the basement of the chancel has housed emergency medical service (Polish: Pogotowie ratunkowe), in the nave were stored benches and postal supplies.

=== Interwar period ===
After Poland regained independence in 1920, the church was used back for sacred purposes. Between 1920 and 1922, a complete renovation has been carried out, originally designed by the architect Kazimierz Ulatowski, and later under the direction of Stefan Cybichowski from Poznań:

- External additions of Prussian outbuildings were demolished,
- Buttress in the north-west corner of nave was reconstructed,
- A renaissance-style restoration of priest sacristy was conducted without great success, distorting the original stylistic character,
- The interior walls and the chancel floorwere removed,
- A restoration of arches, windows patterns, doorways have been performed,
- Walls were reinforced with a new plaster and the ceiling secured.

In 1922, a new facade portal has been built by Jakub Job, according to the project of Stefan Cybichowski. After renovation, the church interior has gained new equipment, including an altar from a Poznań workshop Roman, new benches, stalls, kneelers, confessional s and a pulpit realized using older sculptural elements. On the Matroneum has been mounted a six scale organ.

The second consecration of the church happened on 3 December 1922. The ceremony has been conducted by Consecrated by Cardinal Edmund Dalbor, Archbishop of Gniezno and Poznań, assisted by Antoni Laubitz, and the pastor of the parish church in Bydgoszcz, brother Tadeusz Skarbek-Malczewski. The church was a filial church of Bydgoszcz's Cathedral and the office of youth ministry.

On 16 November 1925 another ceremony of consecration occurred to "re-grant" St. Clare's church to the Assumption of the Blessed Virgin Mary, celebrated by suffragan bishop of Gniezno Antoni Laubitz. Prior to the ceremony, the interior received a new plaster, and Henryk Jackowski decorated the walls with frescoes. Inside the church, several works of paintings were also created, including:

- St. Anthony by Kazimiery Pajzderskiej,
- Ste Thérèse of Lisieux and Our Lady of Częstochowa by Henryk Jackowski,
- St. Stanislaus Kostka by- Leon Wyczółkowski (dedicated by the artist to school students in Bydgoszcz).

In 1933, a plaque has been mounted on the facade of the church in honor of Polish kings Stephen Báthory and John III Sobieski, designed and executed by Bydgoszcz artists Piotr Triebler and Andrzej Gajewski. This work was destroyed by the Germans in 1939. On 3 March 1931 the Church of the Poor Clares was inscribed in the Register of Architectural Monuments of Second Polish Republic as one of the four oldest churches in Bydgoszcz.

=== Since 1939 ===
At the outbreak of World War II the church was still available for worship, but in March 1941, Nazi occupying forces closed the building. Overall restoration work was undertaken in 1950, and this still sets the appearance of today's church.

This work included, inter alia, partial roofing, renovation of façade near the summit, changes to the window openings and veneering of the facade. During those works a sensational discovery has been made under the floor of the nave, where a grave Megalith with urns from 500 BC has been unearthed. In 1952, while scraping out internal plaster ], relics of four embedded crosses have been revealed in the chancel (Polish: Zacheuszek), probably from the time of the first consecration of the church in 1645. In 1952 was also transferred the gravestone of Sophia Smoszewska, the first abbess, from the porch to the northern chancel.

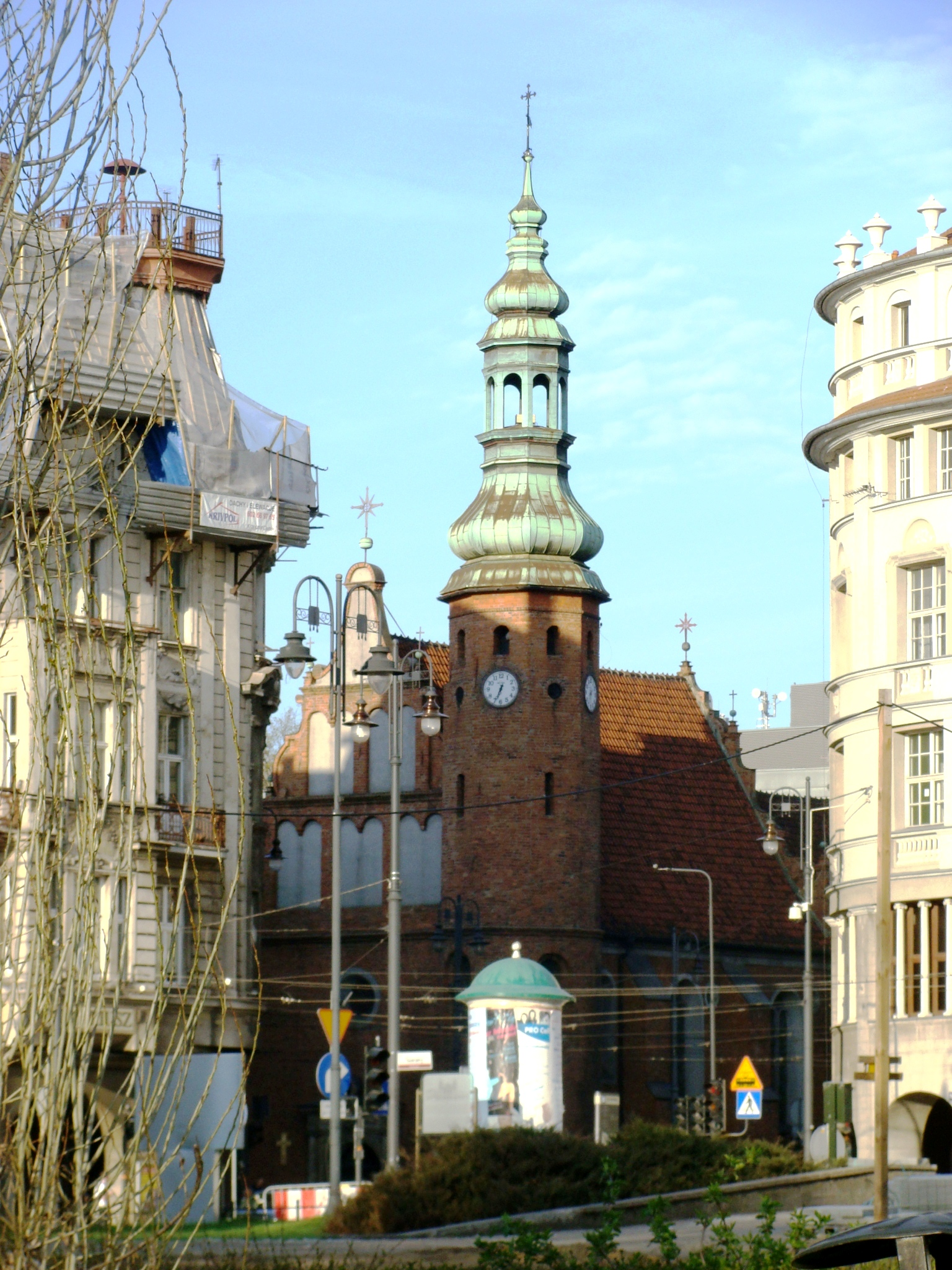
View from Theatre Square

In 1954, a 12-scaled organ, from one of the Protestant temples, has replaced the former one dating from the 1920s, which has been moved to Osiek church. From 1953 to 1954, several conservation works have been carried out under the supervision of professor Leonard Torwirt from Nicolaus Copernicus University in Toruń, focusing on:

- Polychromed roof of the nave,
- Tower stairs leading to the chancel gallery,
- Painting Jude the Apostle by brush Edward Kwiatkowski.

In 1955, on an arch wall has been unveiled a preserved 17th-century fresco, as well as bricked oculi on the northern and southern walls of the naves, which have restored two years later.

An important step of the refurbishing has been, in 1955, to get back the original 17th-century main altar from Sypniewo. Its return was preceded by many years of efforts from the rector of the church, brother Gierzyński, supported by the written consent of Primate of Poland Stefan Wyszynski. It has been inserted back to its original place, where was originally displayed the painting Coronation of the Virgin with attires of Poor Clares. However, the picture was so decayed that even before the altar restitution, it has been replaced by the image of the "Madonna Apocalyptic" (ca. 1900). Among the other artifacts returned to the church were the forged iron grille separating the chancel from the nave, dating back to the secularization of the church, and temporarily installed on the gate of Starofarny Cemetery in Bydgoszcz and the grating of the sacristy of priests (later the chapel of St. Teresa, and now chapel of Our Lady of Czestochowa).

In 1957, stained glass was installed in the chancel, following the design of Zdzislaw Kuligowski. 1958 repairs and restoration treatments completed the post-war process of overall renovation of the church. In the mid-1960s the old galvanized steel cover of the spire was replaced and in the nave was fixed a Majolica Stations of the Cross.

In 1971, due to the need to modernize the streets in downtown Bydgoszcz, an option discussed was shifting the church of St. Clare to the place of the building of the monastery, which would be demolished. But another solution came out, which guaranteed the preservation of both monuments

A restoration work on polychromed ceiling and wall paintings has been performed from 1987 to 1989, and another in the early 1990s. In 1991 began the restoration work of the main altar, and the plaster covering of the chancel walls and vaults, removing old stucco from the 1920s and revealing original primary colors.

=== Parish ===
Since World War II, the church has received higher titles:

- In 1951, rector's church,
- In 1972, academic church by decree of Primate of Poland Stefan Wyszyński,
- In 1983, it ceased to be a subsidiary of St. Patrick's Cathedral. Martin and Nicholas in Bydgoszcz.

From 13 November 1993 the pastoral work of the church has been conducted by the order of Friars Minor Capuchin.

== Architecture ==
The Church of the Poor Clares survived to the present day as an eastward facing church, with an elongated nave with three sides closed chancel, which adjoins the sacristy and a chapel. This church harmoniously combines elements of different architectural styles, Gothic, Renaissance and Baroque

The oldest walls in the northern part of the chancel date from 1582. The architecture of the church was established in reference to an older church, the Bernardine Church of Our Lady Queen of Peace in Bydgoszcz. Attics of the priests chapel are the best Renaissance elements of the building.

=== Chancel ===
The church's chancel possesses vaults with lunettes, covered with a mesh of arches. It gives the illusion of cross-arched vaults as in medieval buildings, but this network does not play any structural role, it's only a decorative element. In the chancel, in addition to semicircular windows, there are oculi: these are Renaissance architectural elements, typical of the churches erected in the early 17th century.

=== Nave ceiling ===
The nave of the church is covered with wooden, polychromed ceiling from with the first half of the 17th century, a complex of 112 coffers adorned with painted rosettes and symbolic characters. 103 coffers' rosettes are filled with stylized petals, the 9 remaining symbols are associated with Mary (mother of Jesus), Jesus and mendicant orders. The canopy refers to Middle Ages tradition, although it uses Renaissance elements.

=== Western gable ===
The western gable has got plastered openings - similar to those that can be seen in Bydgoszcz Cathedral or those present in the bygone St. Mary's Church of the Carmelites in Bydgoszcz. It is divided into cornices and arcades and decorated with volutes, obelisks and globes

=== Tower ===
On the north-west corner of the church structure stands a circular tower, with confers a sturdy and unusual silhouette to the whole building. The upper part is octagonal, topped by a steeple ending with a roof lantern. The tower houses a stairs, allowing to access the matroneum of the nave.

=== Matroneum ===
The Matroneum, located on the back of the nave, is supported by four massive columns.

=== Chapel Łochowski ===
The priests chapel's roof is topped with a Renaissance attic. The wall of the parapet is composed of a fragmented double arcade. The attic of priests chapel is similar in its structure to the attic of the city hall in Tarnów, and it is close to the 16th-century Kościelecki chapel of St. Margaret church in Kościelec.

=== Interior ===
Inside the temple are many masterpieces, including:

- The main altar (1636), mannerist style, richly decorated, with painting Assumption of the Blessed Virgin Mary by Jerzy Hoppen from Toruń(ca 1955);
- St. Stanislaus Kostka brush painting by Leon Wyczółkowski;
- A polychrome (17th-18th centuries);
- Pulpit in Rococo style (second half 18th century);
- Bas-relief in alabaster mannerist style (1595);
- Baroque latticework grill(17th-18th century), located under the arch between the nave and the chancel. It was returned in the 1950s from the Cathedral;
- Gothic and baroque brass decorations.

The pipe organ originates from an unidentified church. It is likely to be a work from Paul Voelkner's company. In its current location, the instrument has been modified and expanded numerous times.

Since 1946, when was celebrated the 600th anniversary of Bydgoszcz city, is played daily (at 1500, 1800) from the tower of the church, the "bugle call of Bydgoszcz", composed by Konrad Pałubicki (1910-1992) from a Kashubian dance tune.

The church was registered on the Pomeranian Heritage List (Nr.601229-reg.A/209), on 31 March 1931.

== Gallery ==
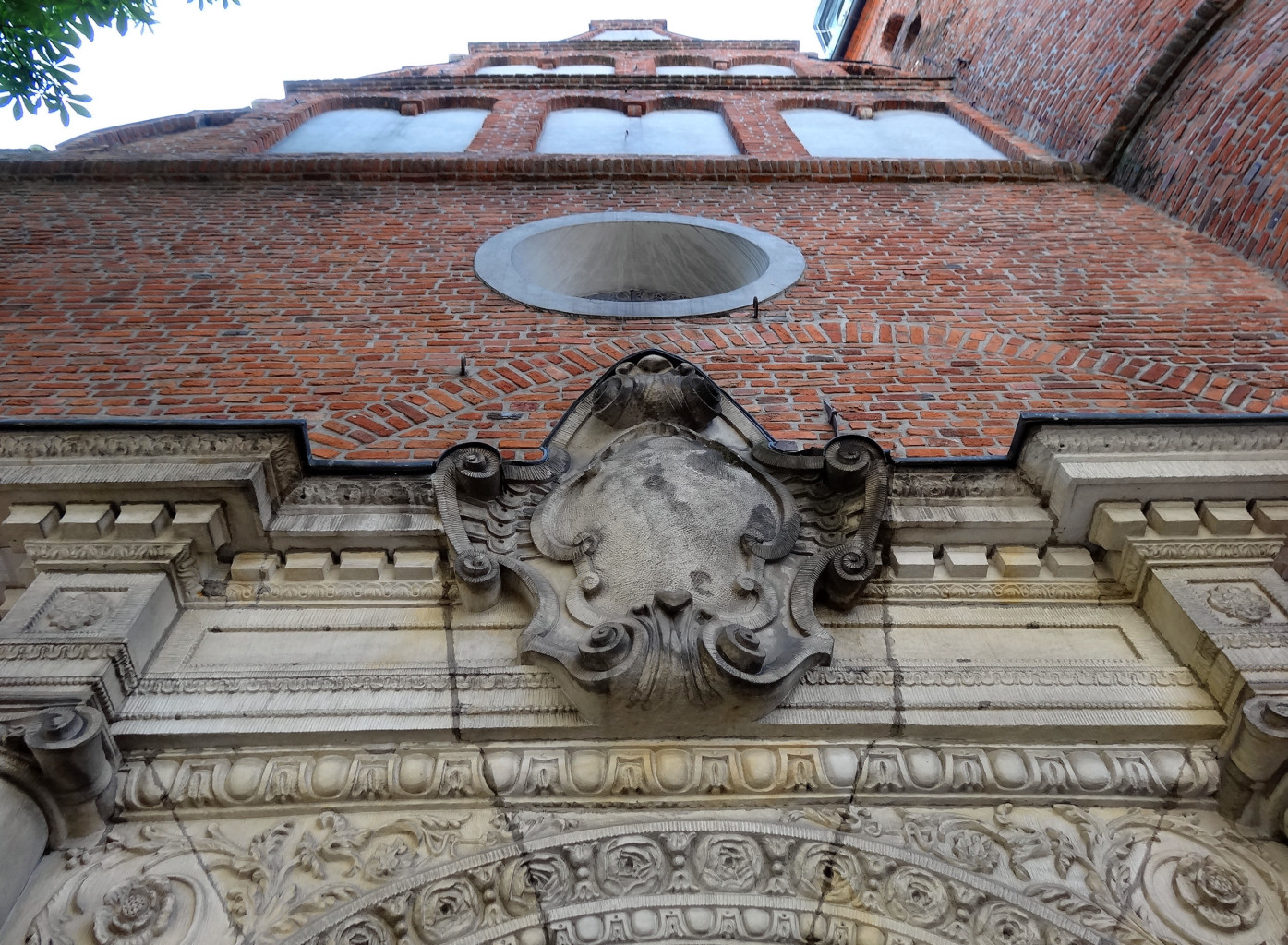
Pediment

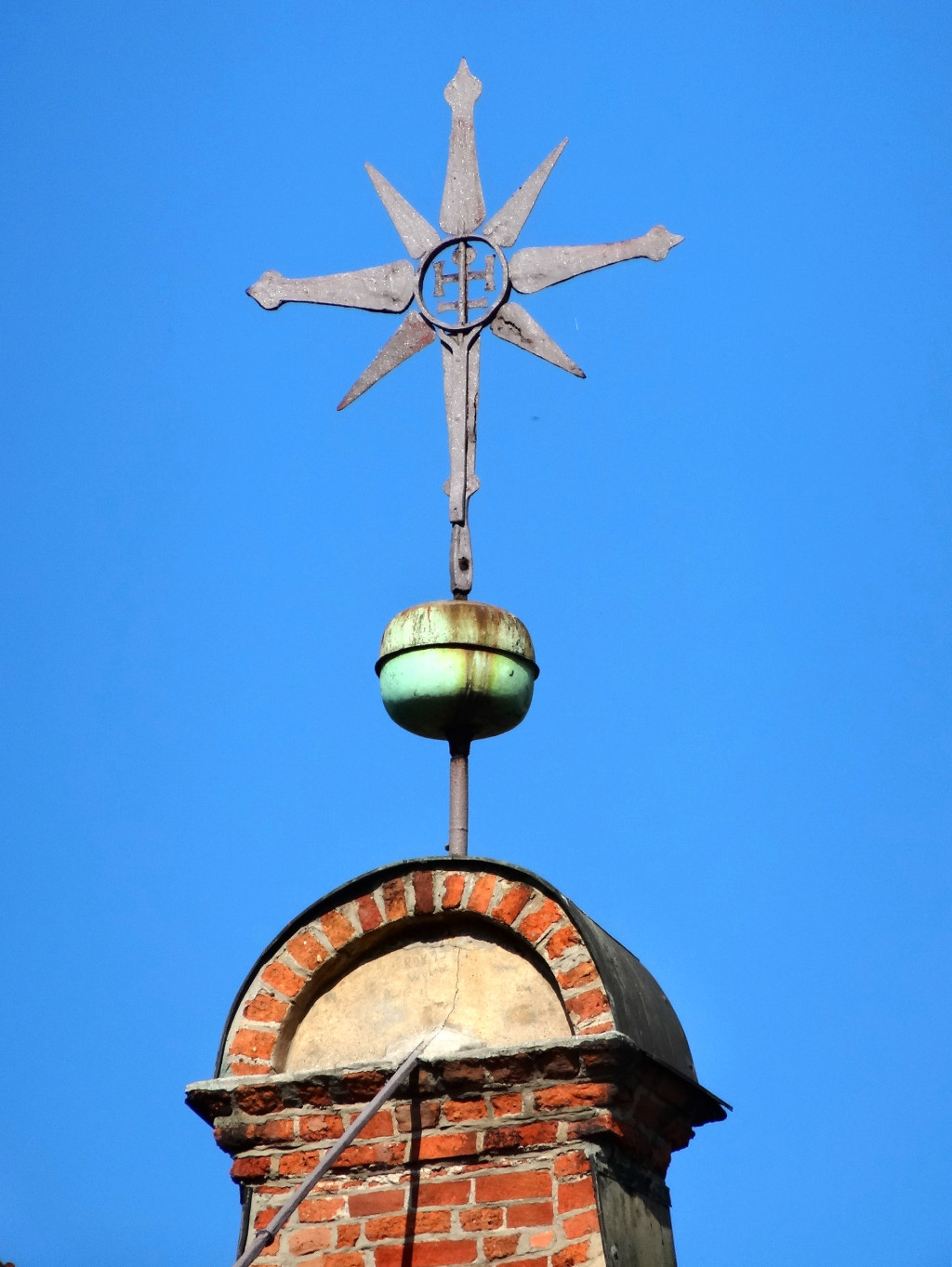
Spire

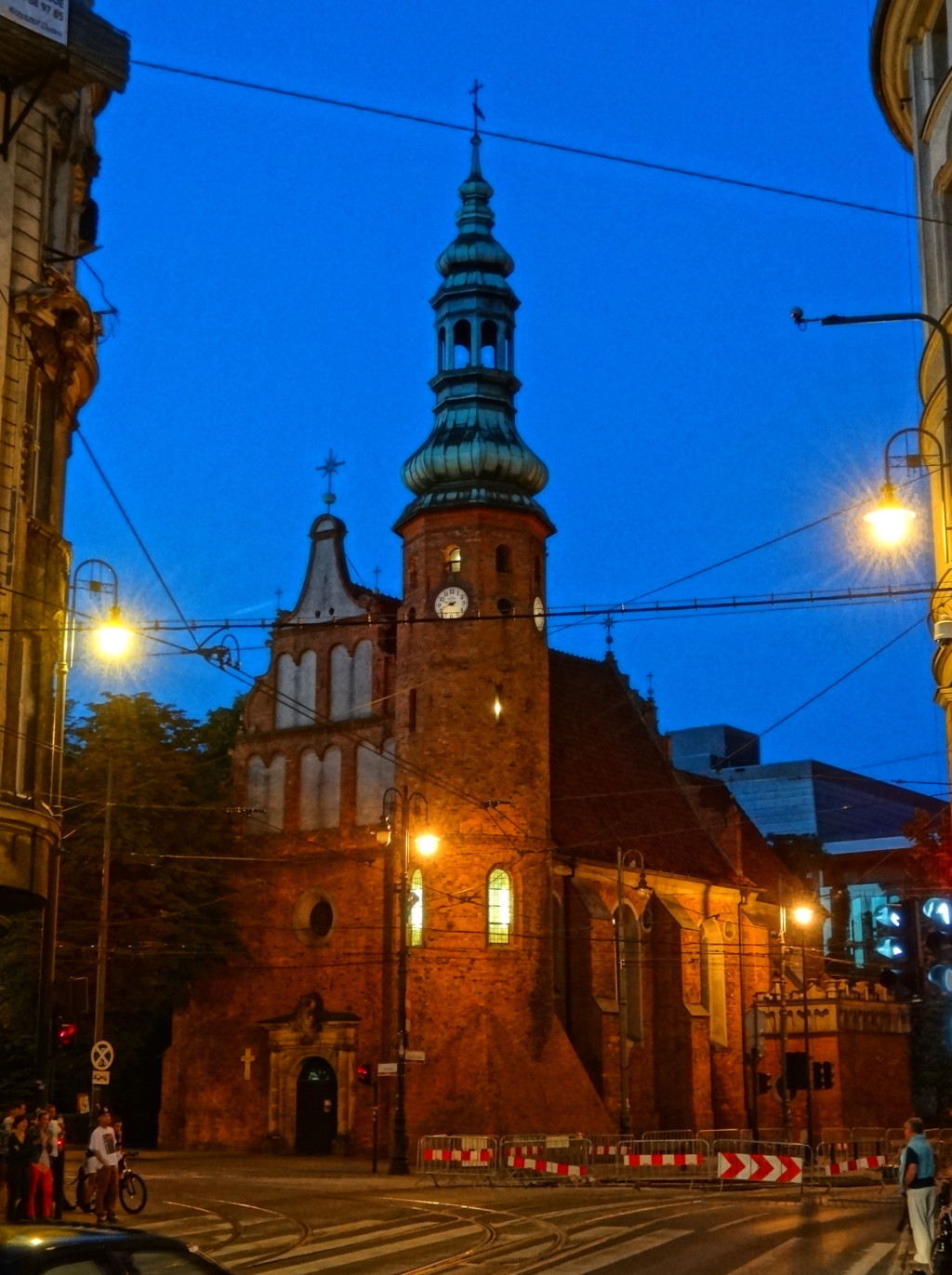
By night

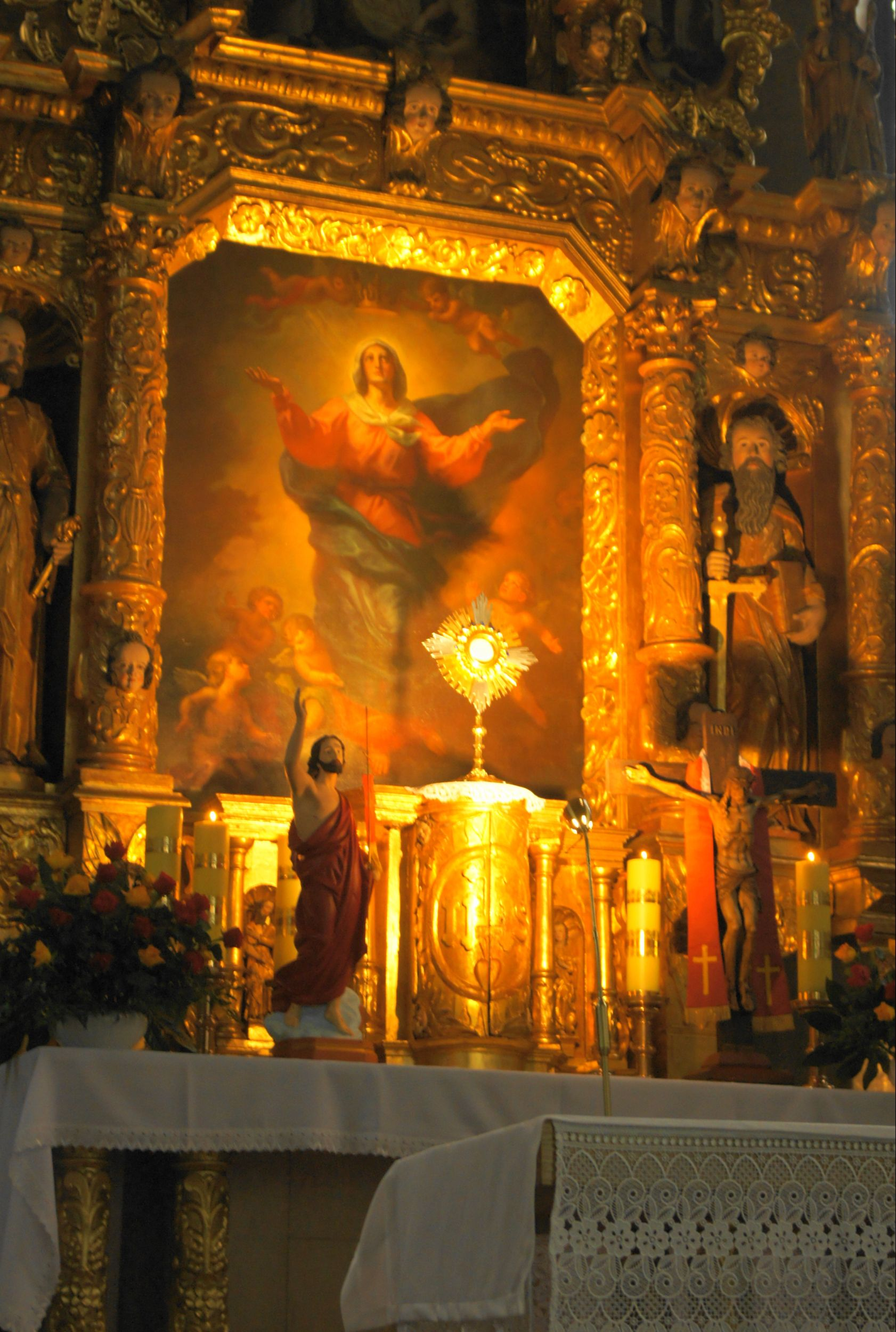
Main Altar

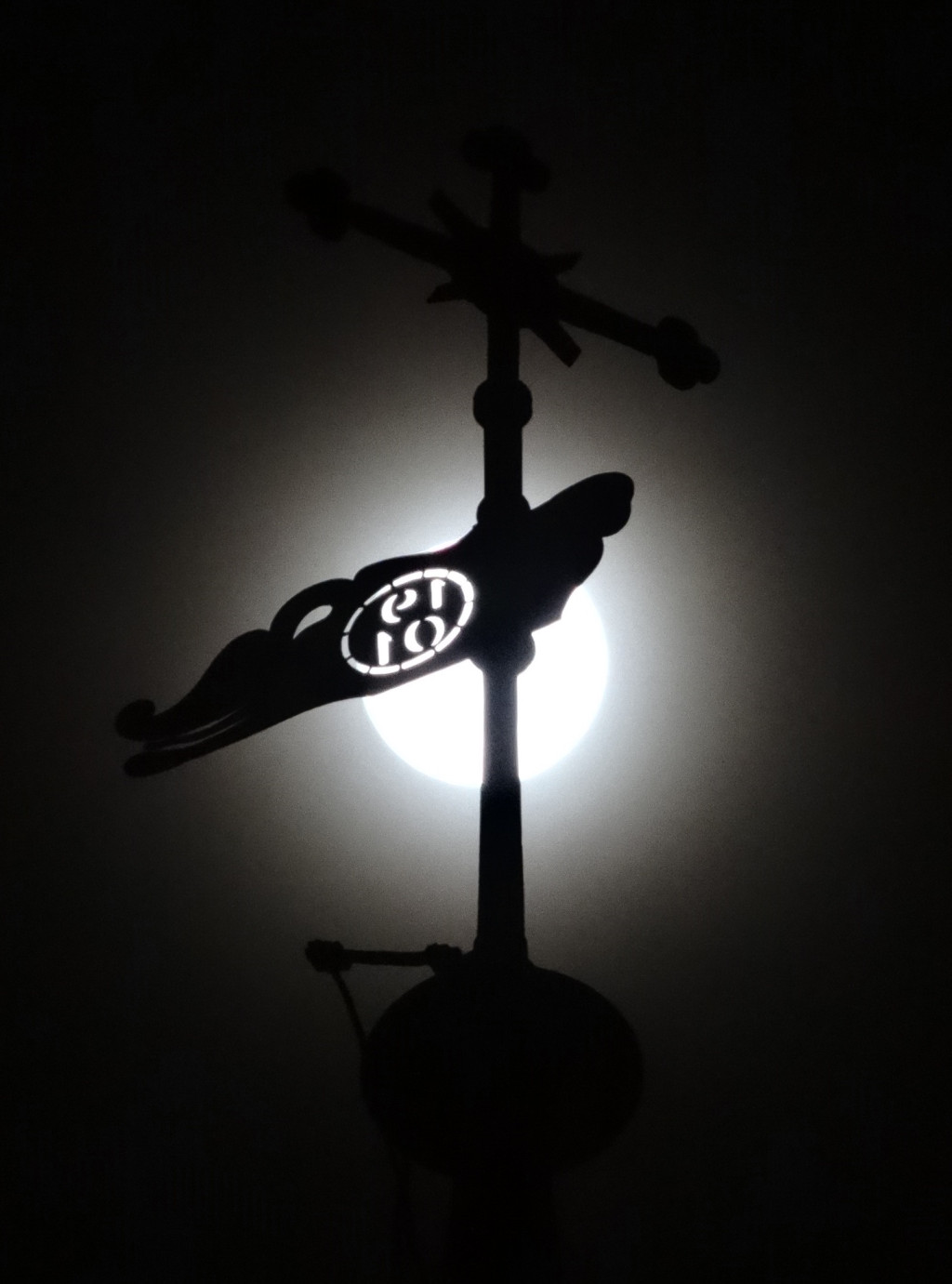
Cross and weathervane, with its inception date

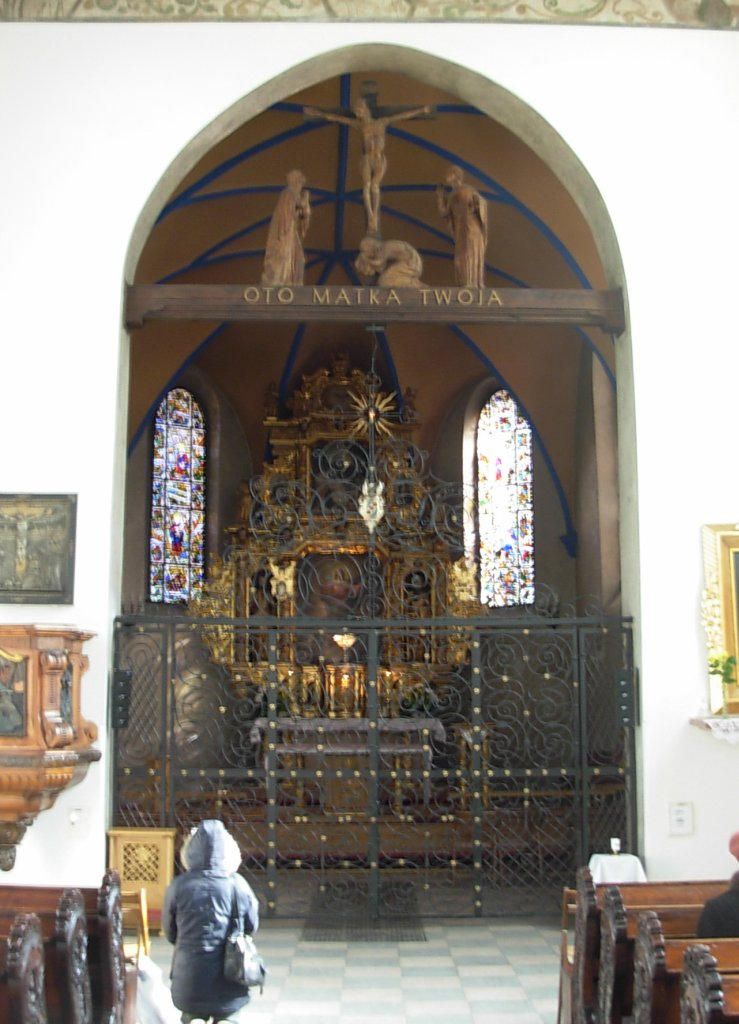
Latticework and arch

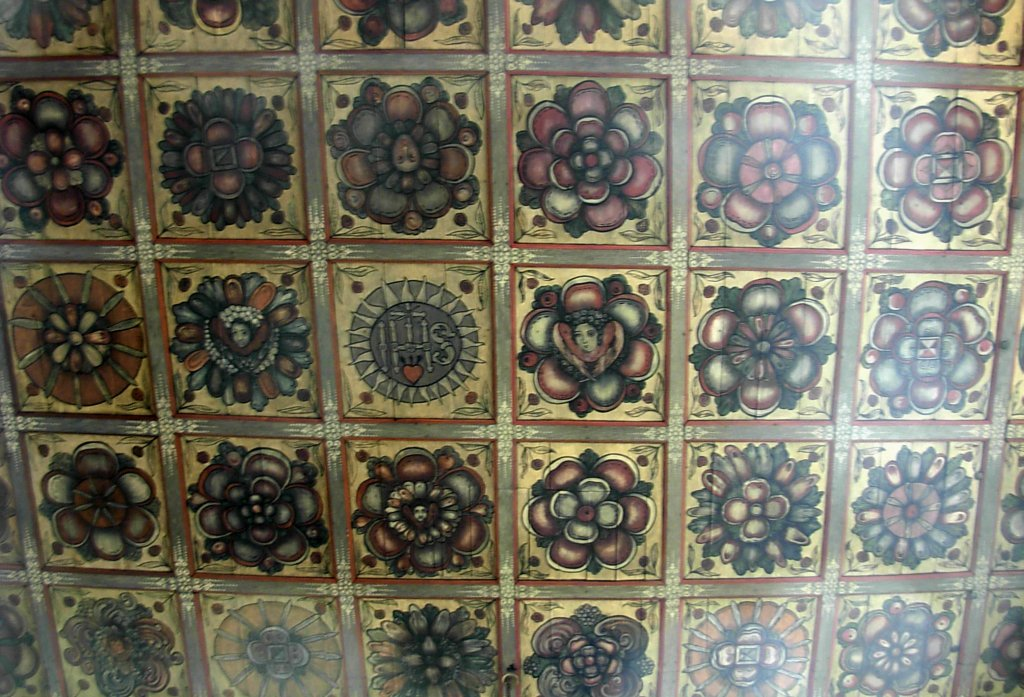
Polichromed coffered ceiling - 17th century

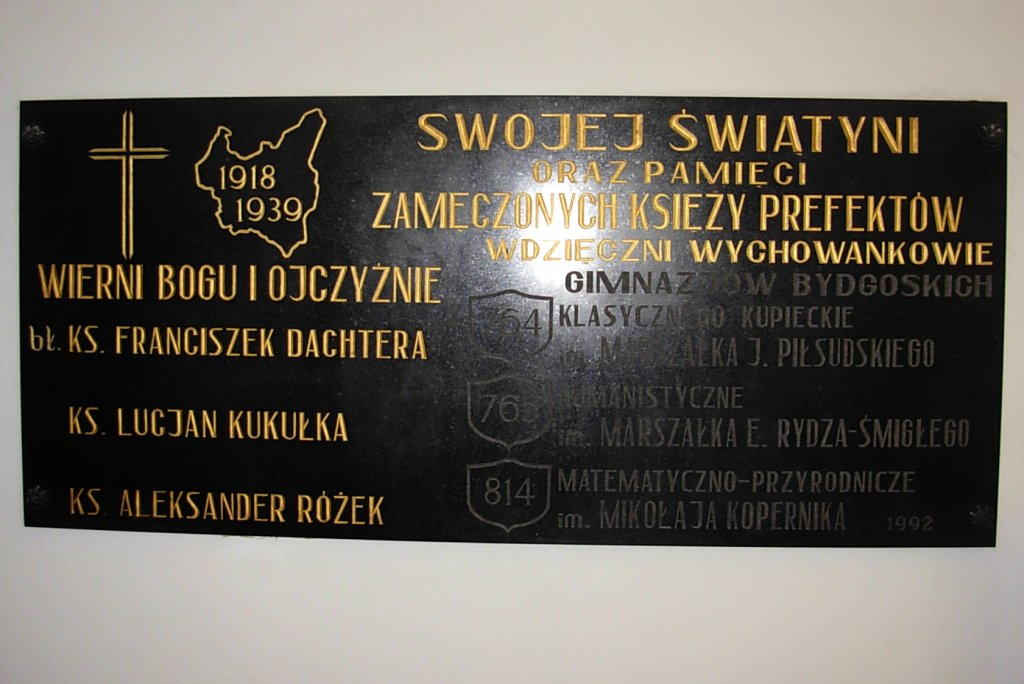
Plaque in remembrance of the murdered priests during the Nazi occupation of Bydgoszcz

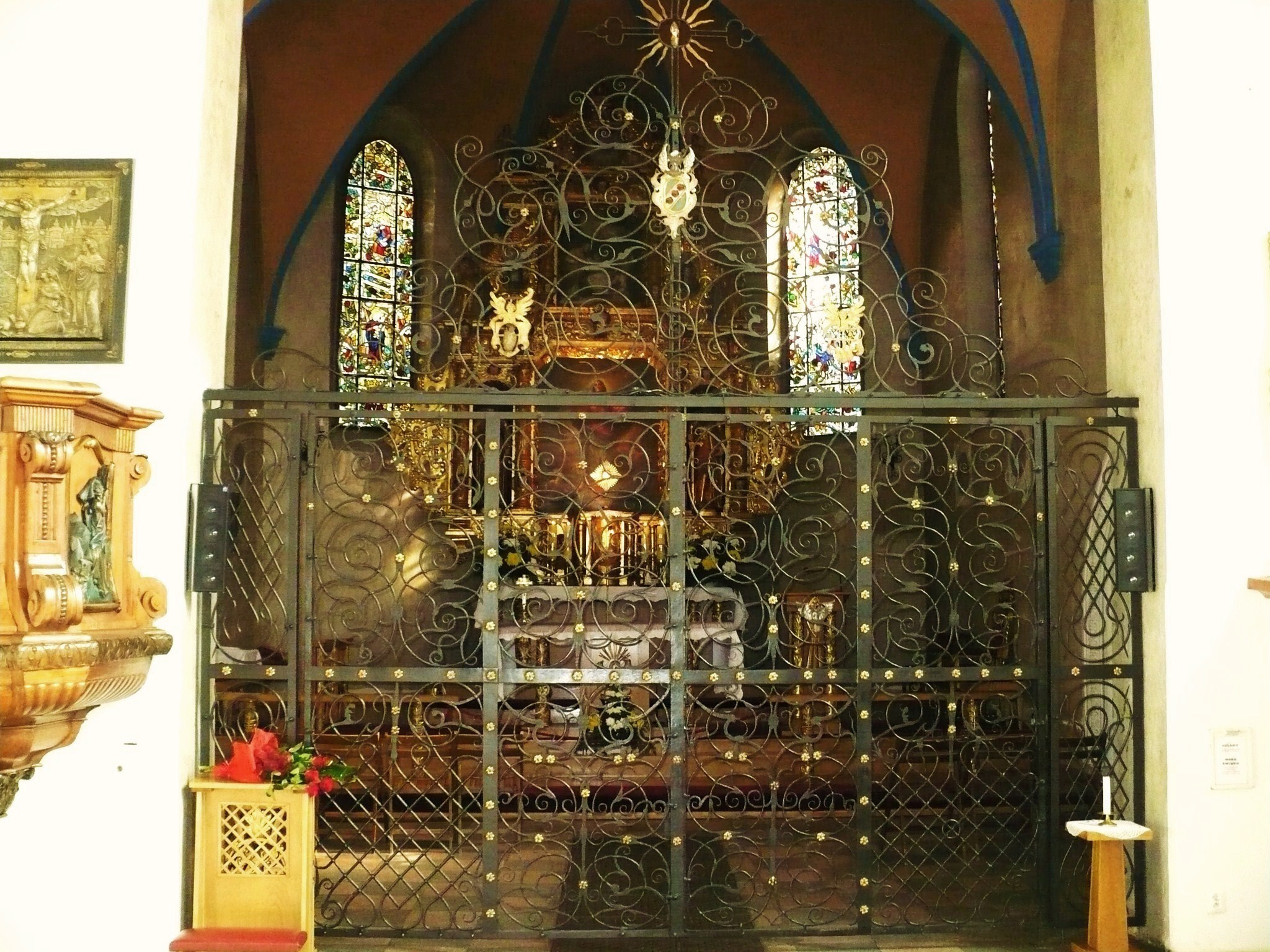
Baroque grille (zoom)

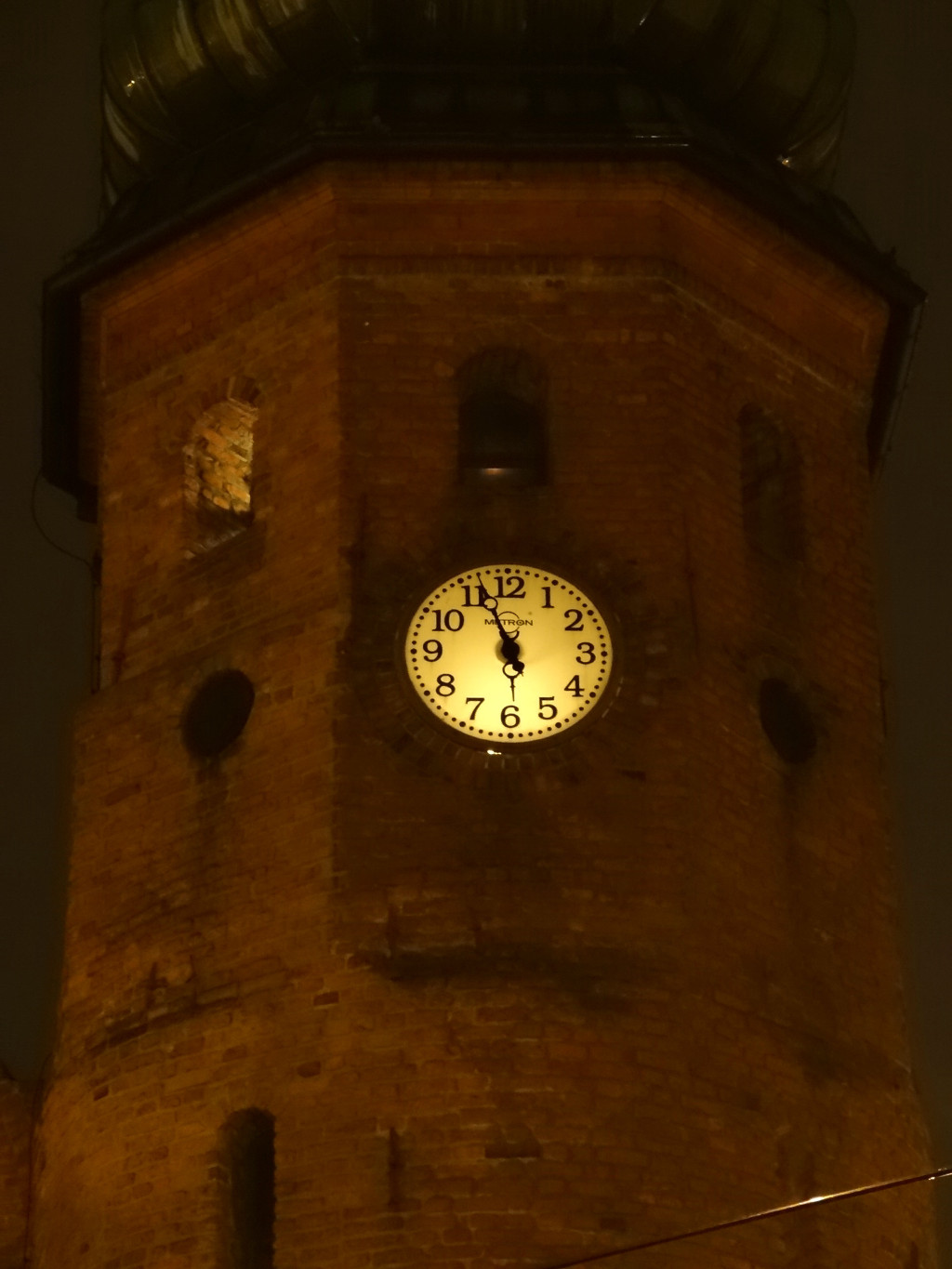
By night, clock tower

== See also ==
- Bydgoszcz
- Jagiellońska street in Bydgoszcz
- Gdanska Street in Bydgoszcz
- Building from Poor Clare's monastery
- St. Martin and St. Nicholas Cathedral, Bydgoszcz
- Carl Meyer
- Konrad Pałubicki

== Bibliography ==
- (in Polish) Bartoszyńska-Potemska, Albina (1965). Dzieje i architektura kościoła i klasztoru Klarysek w Bydgoszczy. Prace komisji sztuki t. I. Seria D. Bydgoskie Towarzystwo Naukowe. Bydgoszcz: Prace Wydziału Nauk Humanistycznych.
- (in Polish) Bartowski, Krzysztof (2002). Najstarszy kościół szpitalny w Bydgoszczy, a klasztor ss. Klarysek – zarys dziejów i problematyki konserwatorskiej. Materiały do dziejów kultury i sztuki Bydgoszczy i regionu, z. 7. Bydgoszcz: Pracownia Dokumentacji i Popularyzacji Zabytków Wojewódzkiego Ośrodka Kultury w Bydgoszczy. pp. 33–48.
- (in Polish) Biskup, Marian (1991). Historia Bydgoszczy. Tom I do roku 1920. Warszawa-Poznań: Bydgoskie Towarzystwo Naukowe.
- (in Polish) Derenda, Jerzy (2006). Piękna stara Bydgoszcz – tom I z serii Bydgoszcz miasto na Kujawach. Bydgoszcz: Towarzystwo Miłośników Miasta Bydgoszczy.
- (in Polish) Derenda, Jerzy (2008). Bydgoszcz w blasku symboli – tom II z serii Bydgoszcz miasto na Kujawach. Bydgoszcz: Towarzystwo Miłośników Miasta Bydgoszczy.
- (in Polish) Janiszewska-Mincer, Barbara (1985). Z dziejów klasztoru i kościoła Klarysek. Kalendarz Bydgoski. Bydgoszcz: Towarzystwo Miłośników Miasta Bydgoszczy. pp. 59–62.
- (in Polish) Jankowski, Aleksander (1999). Kościół Klarysek pod wezwaniem Wniebowzięcia Najświętszej Marii Panny w Bydgoszczy. Kronika Bydgoska – tom specjalny wydany z okazji wizyty papieża Jana Pawła II w Bydgoszczy. Bydgoszcz: Towarzystwo Miłosnikow Miasta Bydgoszczy - Bydgoskie Towarzystwo Naukowe.
- (in Polish) Łbik, Lech (1999). Narodziny bydgoskiej parafii, średniowieczne świątynie, parafialny laikat, dekanat. Kronika Bydgoska, tom specjalny wydany z okazji wizyty papieża Jana Pawła II w Bydgoszczy. Bydgoszcz: Towarzystwo Miłośników Miasta Bydgoszczy.
