= Rescue and Firefighting Unit No. 1 (Bydgoszcz) =

- Polish: Jednostka Ratowniczo-Gaśnicza nr 1
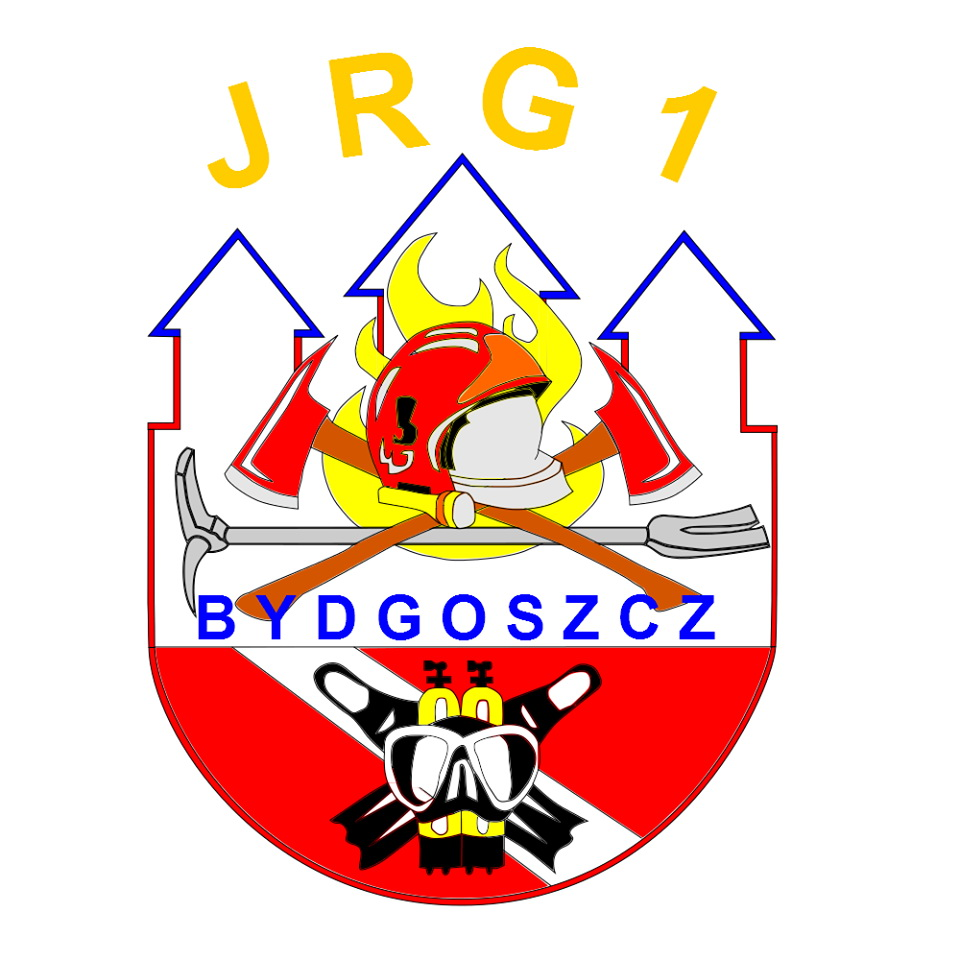

Operational area
- Country: Poland
- Kuyavian-Pomeranian Voivodeship: Bydgoszcz
- Address: 16 Pomorska street, 85-050 Bydgoszcz
- Coordinates: 53°7′43″N 18°0′12″E

Agency overview
- Established: 2 June 1864

Facilities and equipment
- Trucks: 31
- Quints: 2
- Rescue boats: 3

Website
- Official website

The Rescue and Firefighting Unit No. 1 is a fire station located in downtown Bydgoszcz, Poland, at 16 Pomorska street. The building is registered on the Kuyavian-Pomeranian Voivodeship Heritage List.

== History ==
=== Early times ===
On the initiative of two merchants, Herman Kraus and Karl Wenzl, the Board of the Volunteer Fire Department in Bydgoszcz was established on 20 March 1864 and began its duty on 2 June 1864.

In addition to the Volunteer Brigade, a professional Fire Brigade was created established in 1872, having its headquarters in Poor Clares' Church which had been secularized. To fit fire activity, a gate was created on the wall of the ex-church giving onto Jagiellońska street: doing so allowed horse carts to enter and exit. Likewise, stables and forage storage were located in an adjoining building (now located at the place of Drukarnia shopping mall). The chief fireman officer, known as Brandmeister, received a professional training in Berlin.

In 1893 the Guard received its first steam-powered fire engine. In 1894, 14 fire signaling systems were set up in the city and between 1898 and 1900, the first fire hydrants appeared in the streets. Firefighter equipment was modern for those times, and the increasing need for storage resulted in the brigade leaving their tight premises of Poor Clares' former church.

The new fire station designed by Theodore Patzwald and located at 16 Pomorska street (then 63 RinkauerStraße), was declared operational on 23 December 1911. At that time, firefighters were equipped among others, with:

- Horse-drawn carts;
- Hand pumping machines;
- Water barrels;
- Pike poles
- Anchors;
- Adzes;
- Fire flappers.

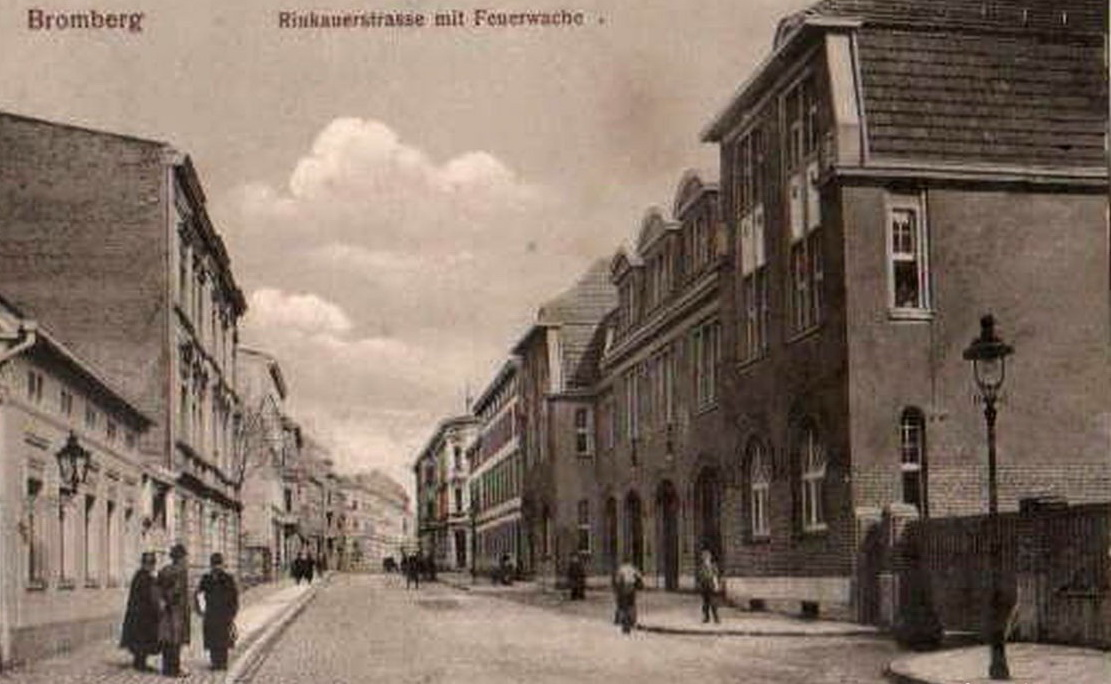
Pomorska street with the firestation ca 1915

In the early 20th century, Bydgoszcz had almost 400 Fire hydrants ( among which 136 underground ones): they were supplied with water from 20 deep wells.

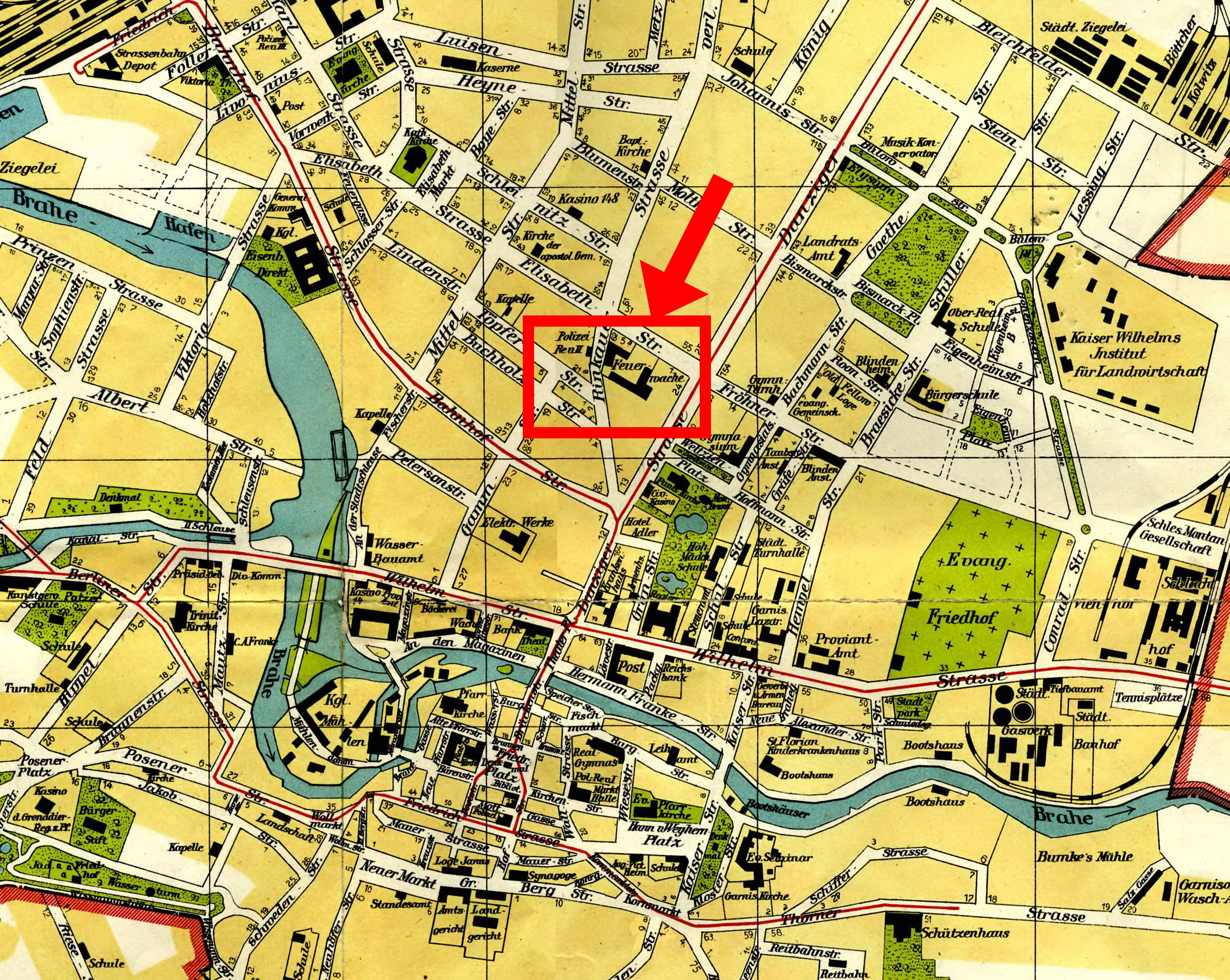
Location of the fire station on a 1914 city map

=== Interwar period ===
Polish municipal authorities, took over German professional fire department: they increased personnel by 52 firefighters and modernized the equipment with horses drawn fire sprinklers and two horse-drawn vehicles equipped with a pump steam. In 1927, new investment provided the department with two French produced "Lafli" fire engines, one mechanical ladder, one tanker and one car.

As a consequence of a bill voted at the parliament on 13 March 1934, on protection against fires, fire protection was considered as an competence under the responsibility of the government. Thus, the fire brigade became subordinated to the city mayor of Bydgoszcz.

=== World War II ===
Acts of war fully mobilized firefighters during the conflict. The professional fire brigade was divided into five sub-units, which were deployed in various parts of the city. After a full day of fire fight started by military skirmishes on 2 September 1939, Bydgoszcz fire brigade was ordered to evacuate the city the following day. The leaving party comprised 17 cars, 5 carriages with 62 professional firefighters and 75 personnel to the reserve. Part of the team fled to the eastern territories: after arriving to Kaunas area, the equipment fell into the hands of soviet authorities.

Several firefighters returned to Bydgoszcz, and some emigrated abroad. With Bydgoszcz re-incorporated to German Reich, German forces organized the fire Brigade by their standards, as a Police Fire department (German: Feuerschultzpolizei), subordinated to Gdańsk authority. 36 Polish firefighters were forced to work in this new unit and cars were painted green since the brigade belonged to the police. Personnel increased to 200 people and equipments were augmented by a large number of cars: in 1944, Bydgoszcz Fire Department owned a total of 38 cars and was divided into three sub-units, covering outside areas like Bielawka and the Chemical Plant (Polish: DAG Fabrik Bromberg) in Łęgnowo. Polish firefighters were persecuted by Nazi authorities, some arrested and deported to concentration camps, where three of them died.

At the end of World War II, the Professional Fire Brigade has been evacuated to Wismar on 21 January 1945, in accordance with a decree of German authorities. Out of the 42 cars, only 2 vehicles and a mechanical l adder were returned to Bydgoszcz city. They soon have been stored back to the station at Pomorska street 16.

=== Post-war era ===
The Polish professional Fire Brigade of Bydgoszcz resumed its activity on 25 January 1945 under the command of Lieutenant Leo Piechocki. Initially, the situation was very unfavorable, with almost no equipment and manpower. Pomorska street having been partly devastated, the fire station has been temporally located in the Hotel Ratuszowy at 37 Długa street. Part of reinforcement came from Nakło nad Notecią personnel, who donated one of their fire trucks, which proved to be extremely useful: in 1945 alone, firefighters extinguished 118 fires in Bydgoszcz city. Another part of the equipment were coming from vehicles abandoned by Germans, partially submerged on Vistula banks. Firefighters took the oversight of fire hydrants and public fire signaling network. Firefighters worked on the rebuilt of the damaged fire station at Pomorska street, to set up training for new volunteers.

A law passed in February 1950 regarding fire protection established national professional bodies for fire protection under the command of a Fire Brigades Headquarters - Polish: Komenda Główna Straży Pożarnych.

In the 1970s, Professional firefighters started to protect the city with three shifts (24/48 hours) from both their headquarters in Pomorska street and in the district of Fordon. The duty was performed by 181 officers and 25 employees of the Headquarters of the Regional Fire Service, overlooking the neighboring municipalities of Bydgoszcz.

An August 1991 Law on Fire Protection created the Rescue Unit No. 1 (Polish: Jednostka Ratowniczo-Gaśnicza Nr.1, JRG 1). The first commander of JRG No. 1 on 1 January 1992, Cpt Peter Kempka. In 1995, has been established in JRG1 a Special Water and Rescue Unit Polish: Specjalistyczna Grupa Ratownictwa Wodno-Nurkowego).

== Current situation ==
Currently JRG1 in Bydgoszcz employs 67 firefighters and command officers. In 2014, the unit had recorded 1169 operational events: 346 fires, 706 local threats and 117 false alarms. In addition it carried out 132 interventions to the benefit of JRG. The building at Pomorska Street 16, several times refurbished and modernized is registered on Kuyavian-Pomeranian Voivodeship heritage list, Nr.601395, Reg.A/860/1-2, 24 November 1994. Today, four other JRG operate in Bydgoszcz.

=== Equipment ===
Today, Bydgoszcz JRG1 has the following equipment:

- 5 Fire engines;
- 1 water rescue truck;
- 3 rescue boats;
- 1 rescue pick-up.

== Architecture ==
Architect Theodore Patzwald erected there a building with typical Art Nouveau features: simplified motifs, wavy shapes, floral ornaments. This elevation echoes facades from architect Erich Lindenburger one can find on Dworcowa Street, at Nr.45 and 47 (both from 1906).

A 2015 refurbishment of the building has given it back its colors and architectural details.

The architectural ensemble has been added to the Kuyavian-Pomeranian Voivodeship Heritage List Nr.601395, Reg. A/860/1-2, on 24 November 1994.

== Gallery ==
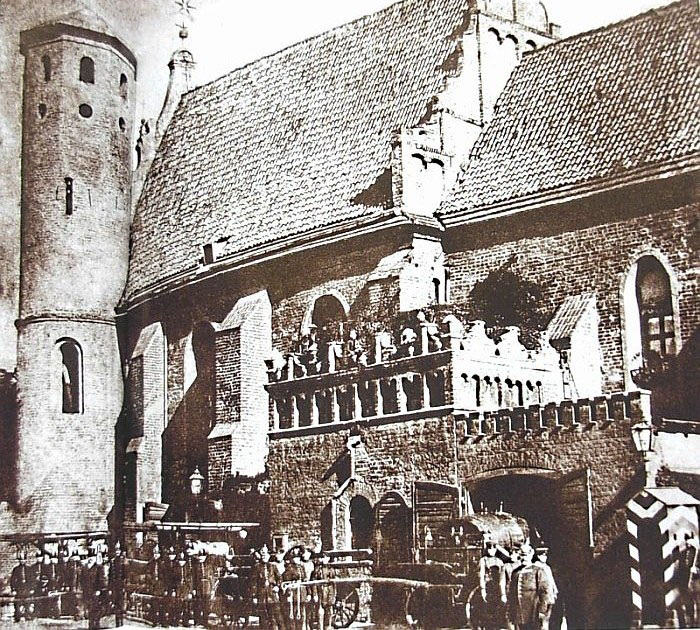
Fire station in Poor Clares' Church, ca 1888

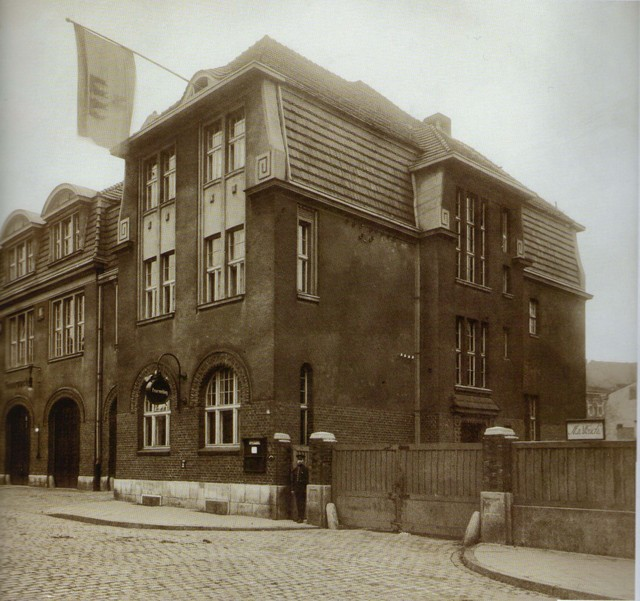
Fire station building circa 1911

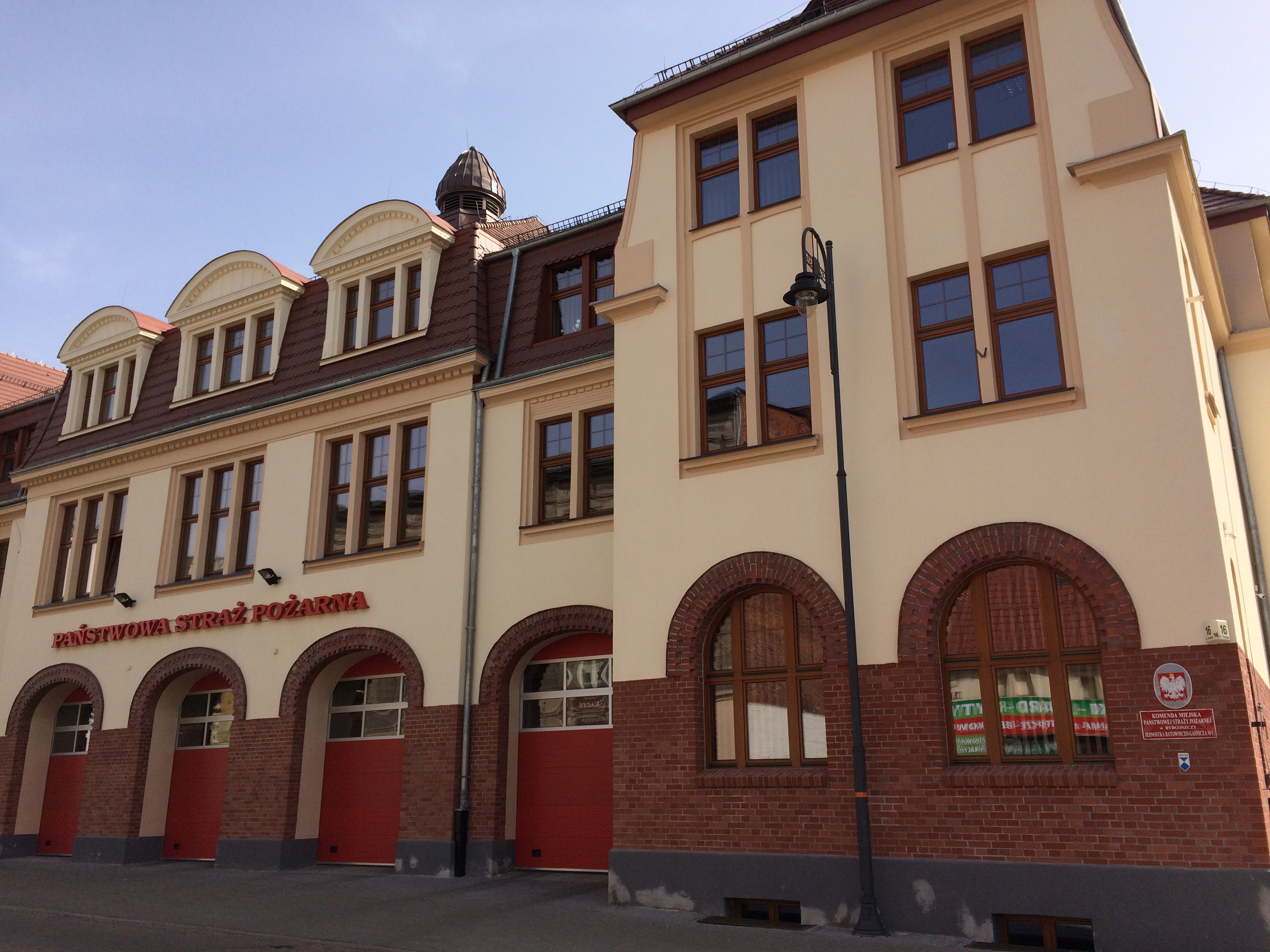
Current view of the building from the street

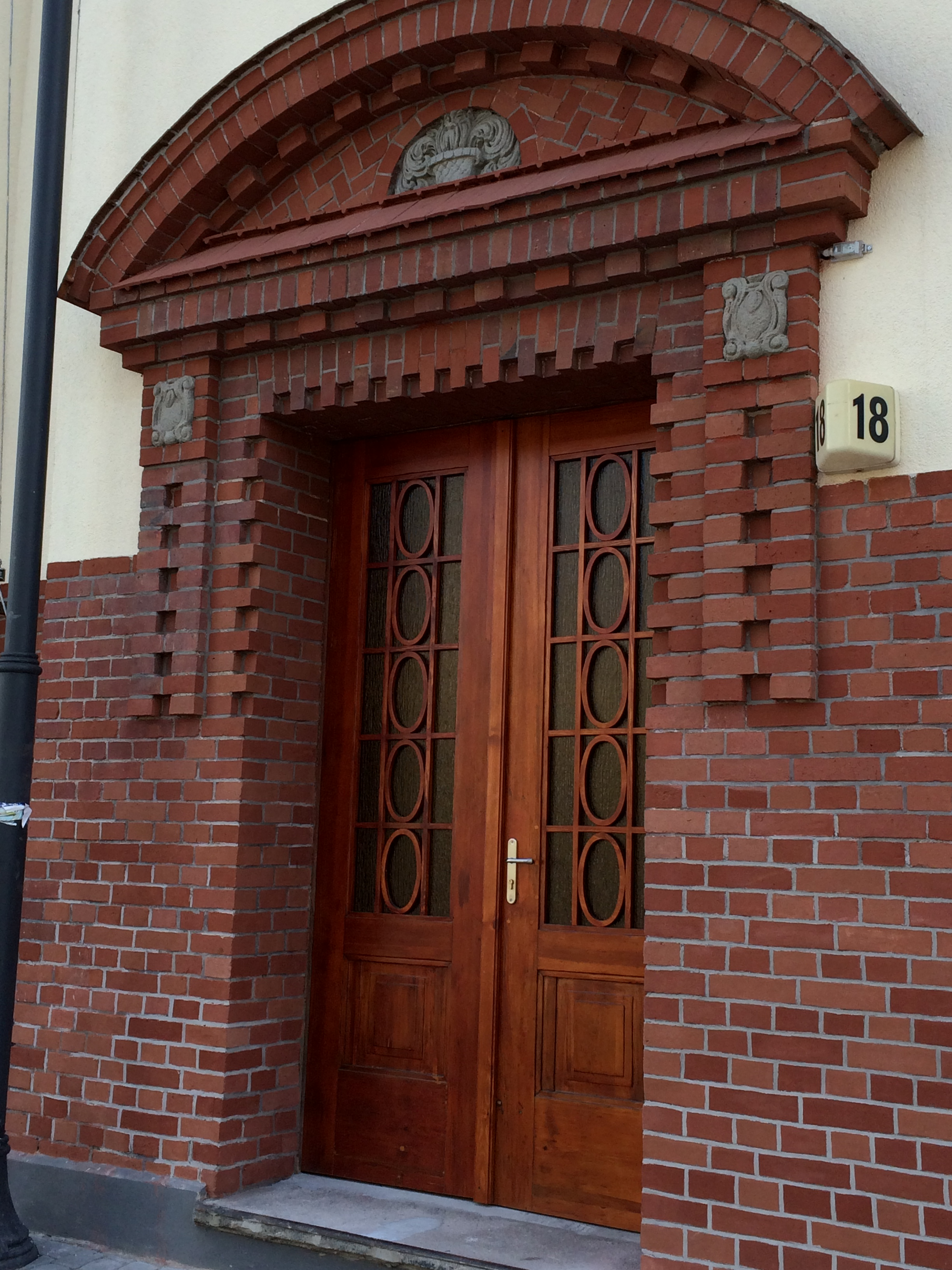
Main gate

== See also ==
- Bydgoszcz
- Pomorska Street in Bydgoszcz
