= Dziembówko =

- Village
- Location within Poland
- Coordinates: 53°4′N 16°49′E
- Country: Poland
- Voivodeship: Greater Poland
- County: Piła
- Gmina: Kaczory

Dziembówko [d͡ʑɛmˈbufkɔ] is a village in the administrative district of Gmina Kaczory, within Piła County, Greater Poland Voivodeship, in west-central Poland.
