= Antoni Laubitz =

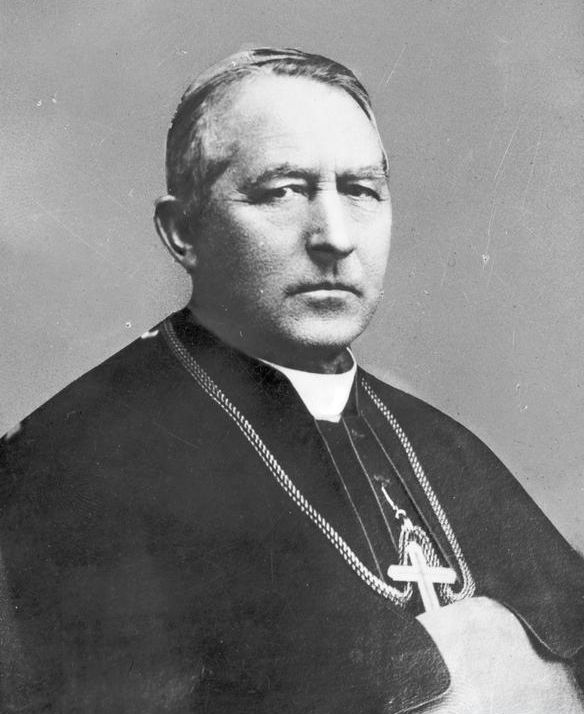
Antoni Laubitz

Antoni Laubitz (7 June 1861 – 17 May 1939) was a Polish bishop of the Roman Catholic Church, a social activist, and an auxiliary bishop in the Roman Catholic Archdiocese of Gniezno.

== Early life ==
Laubitz was born in Pakość. He attended school in Inowrocław, Trzemeszno and Poznań. In Saint Mary Magdalene High School in Poznań he made friends with Jan Kasprowicz. He studied theology at Würzburg and in Gniezno. He took holy orders in 1888 and started to work as a priest and a teacher of religion in Inowrocław.

== Activities ==
Thanks to him, for the 900th anniversary of the martyrdom of Adalbert of Prague (called Saint Wojciech), a monument to the patron saint of Poland was constructed in Inowrocław. On his initiative the romanesque church of the Saint Virgin Mary (called "the Ruin"), which was destroyed by the fire in 1834, was renovated.

He was a patriot who supported the battle with invaders of Poland, and in 1906 defended the participants of the strike against the policy of Kulturkampf. He significantly contributed to the emergence and development of "Kuyavian Journal"' edited by Józef Chociszewski. He also served as Chairman of the Board of the People's Bank of Inowrocław.

In 1920 he moved to Gniezno where he took the position of the parson of the archcathedral parish. In 1924 he was appointed by Pope Pius XI an auxiliary bishop of the Archdiocese of Gniezno. As with his stay in Inowrocław, philanthropy was of great importance to him and, among other things, he patronized the expansion of the Caritas structures.

On 10 March 1938 he was awarded the Order of Polonia Restituta for 'outstanding contribution in the field of social work' .

He died in 1939. He was buried in Gniezno Cathedral.

He contributed to the development of the city and is considered a very important figure in the history of Inowrocław. In 1989 his name was given to one of the main streets in Inowrocław.
