= Regional Museum, Bydgoszcz =

Leon Wyczółkowski Regional Museum in Bydgoszcz
- Polish: Muzeum Okręgowe im. Leona Wyczółkowskiego w Bydgoszczy
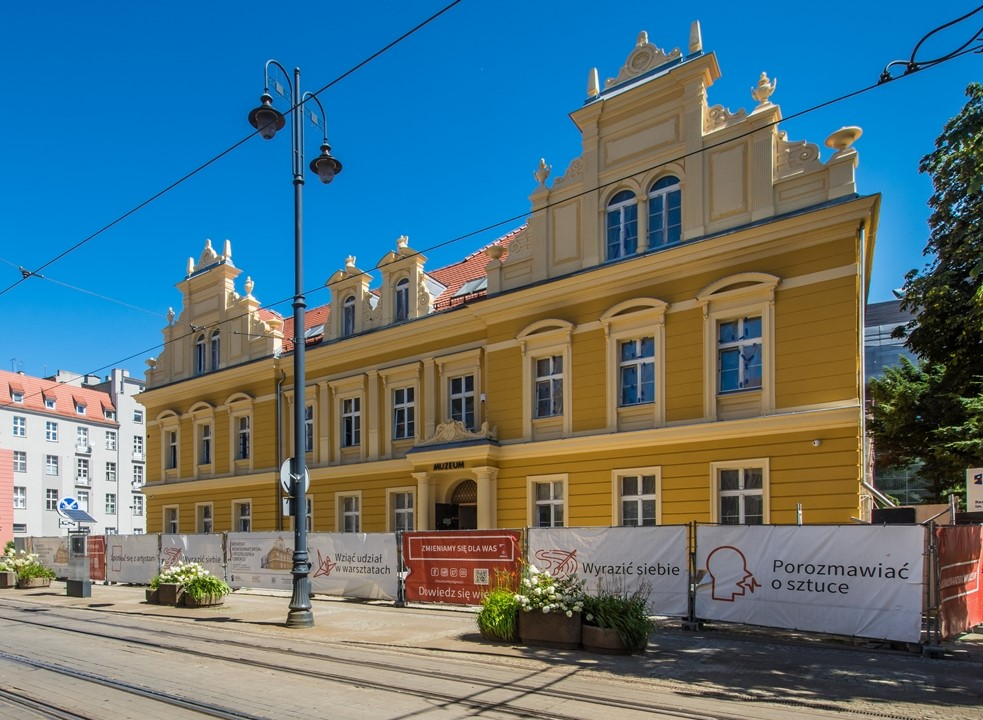
- Museum facade being renovated
- Interactive map of the Leon Wyczółkowski Regional Museum in Bydgoszcz area

General information
- Type: Museum
- Architectural style: Neo-Renaissance, Mannerism
- Location: 4 Gdańska Street, Bydgoszcz, Poland
- Coordinates: 53°7′28″N 18°0′10″E
- Completed: 1618
- Renovated: 1878, 2020

Technical details
- Floor count: 2

Design and construction
- Architect: Wilhelm Lincke

The Leon Wyczółkowski Regional Museum (Polish: Muzeum Okręgowe im. Leona Wyczółkowskiego w Bydgoszczy) is an ensemble of cultural institutions which have been first created in 1923 in the city of Bydgoszcz, Poland.

== Location ==
The seat of the museum is located at 4, Gdańska Street, in downtown district. The historic building was originally part of the former monastery of the Poor Clares. The edifice has been used as a municipal hospital and has received an additional wing along Gdańska street in 1878, with Neo-Renaissance and Mannerism styles.

== History ==
=== Prussian period ===
The institution inherits the traditions of a Prussian association, Historical Society of the Noteć Region (German: Historische Gesellschaft für den Netzedistrikt zu Bromberg) which, from 1880 to 1902, was devoted to collecting historical collections and researching the history of the city of Bromberg and its region. From 1902 to 1945, the society operated as a historical branch of the German Society of Arts and Science in Bydgoszcz (German: Deutsche Gesellschaft für Kunst und Wissenschaft). The collections were located in the former monastery of the Poor Clares' Church and were open to the public from 30 November 1890. The curator until 1920 was Konrad Kothe, a citizen of Bydgoszcz and a naturalist with some museum management practice. In May 1919, in the face of Bydgoszcz return to the reborn Polish state, part of the collection was moved to Berlin and deposited in the Museum für Völkerkunde.

=== Interwar period ===
Taking over the municipal council on 20 January 1920, Polish authorities strove to open a museum for the city. They identified as first location a tenement house on the western frontage of the Old Market Square, at No.2, abutting to the Church of St. Ignacy Loyola (razed in 1940), which used to house the Municipal Savings Bank. The museum opened on 5 August 1923, under the tenure of Bernard Śliwiński, city mayor and its first director was Father Jan Klein, a librarian, museologist and historian from Bydgoszcz.

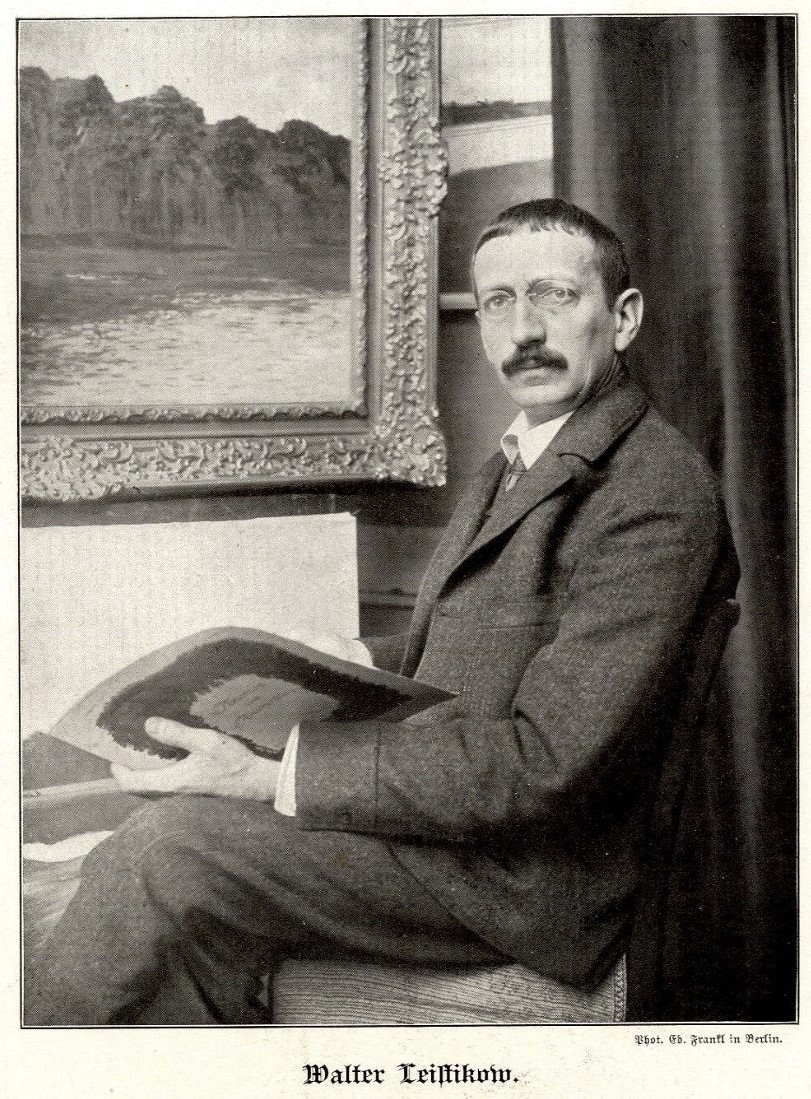
Walter Leistikow by Eduard Frankl

Initially, collections were not extensive, mainly in the field of:

- archeology, the richest section, with several thousand items;
- history, collecting relics from city craft guilds and militaria;
- numismatics;
- ethnography.

Soon a department of Polish art dealing with painting, graphics and sculpture was created. The first two directors Father Jan Klein (1923-1925) and Tadeusz Dobrowolski (1925-1927) dedicated their energy to expand this section. Hence, they acquired works of Teodor Axentowicz, Julian Fałat, Józef Pankiewicz, Jacek Malczewski or Wojciech Weiss. A parallel collection was initiated, aiming at local artists, such as Maksymilian Piotrowski. At its heyday in 1929, the museum possessed 195 paintings and 28 sculptures: it grandly benefited from the attention of the president of Bydgoszcz Bernard Śliwiński.

From 1926 onwards, the activities of the museum were reduced and the staff was reduced. The management board was mainly led by city counselor Tadeusz Janicki and local painter Kazimierz Borucki took over the direction. In 1928, an exhibition of paintings by Bydgoszcz painter Walter Leistikow was set up, in which works by Leon Wyczółkowski, living in nearby village of Gościeradz, were also presented.

The arrival of Leon Barciszewski as a new mayor in 1932, brought back a new life to the activity of the institution. In 1933, an exhibition for the 10th anniversary of the museum was organized, gathering souvenirs and objects narrating the history of Bydgoszcz.

In 1937, as dictated in his will, Leon Wyczółkowski donated his works to the museum, thus greatly increasing its collection. The donation comprised about 400 paintings, graphics, drawings and sketches of the artist, including the equipment of his lithography studio. The same yeat Krakow artist Konstanty Laszczka donated a collection of sculptures. Both contributions were displayed in July 1937 in the building of the former orphanage at Chodkiewicza street, then used for educational purposes.

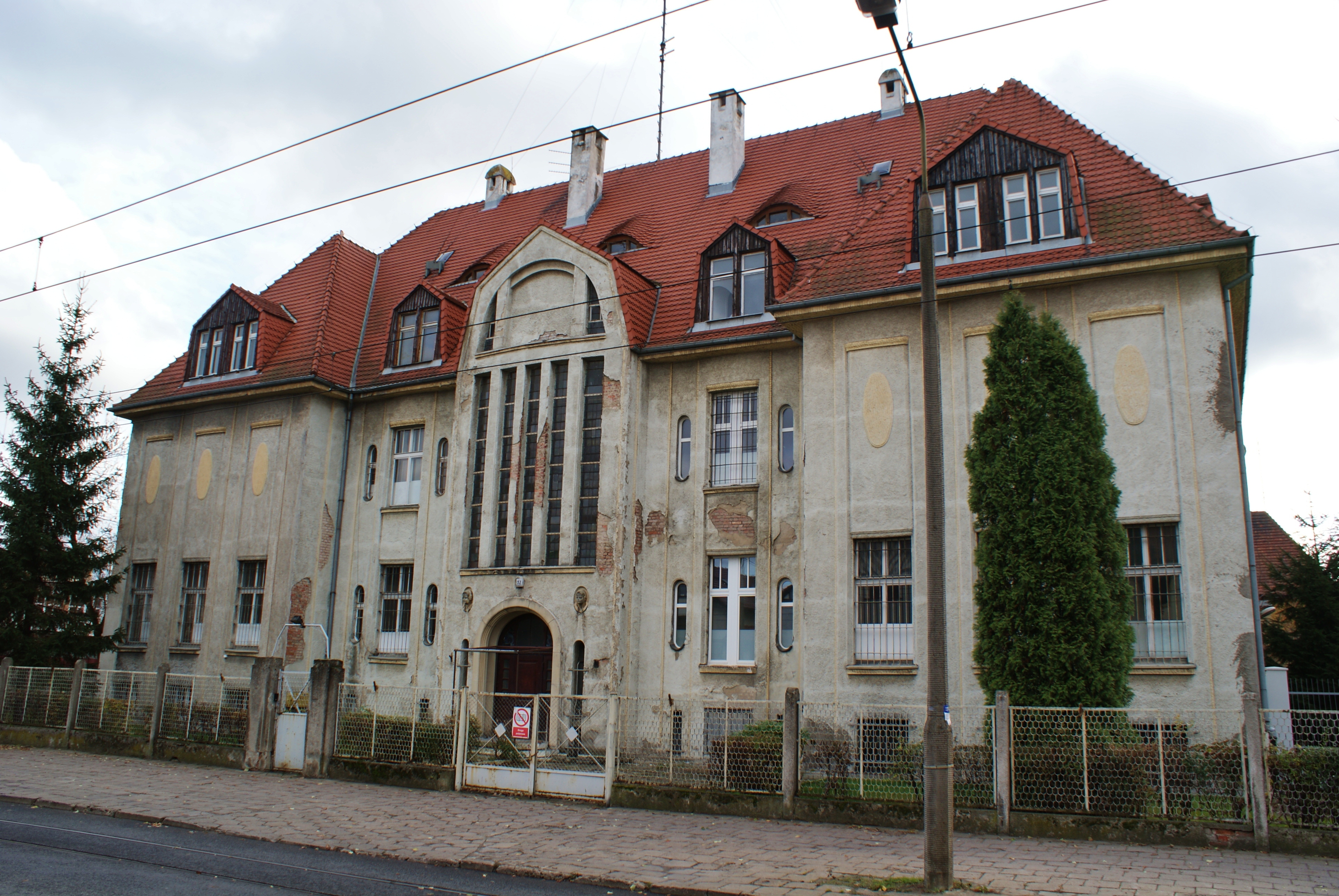
Orphanage at 32, Chodkiewicza street which housed art exhibitions

At the end of August 1939, the collection of the municipal Museum registered 6,803 items:

- half of which listed in the archeology department;
- 1900 objects in the art section;
- 873 items in the numismatics area;
- 210 in the craft and Bydgoszcz history;
- 200 in the ethnography department, including African items;
- 160 in the medalist area;
- 150 in the militaria section.

In addition to the permanent collections, the museum also conducted exhibitions. From 1923 to 1939, about 120 temporary exhibitions were set up and a new permanent exhibition was realized, named as City Gallery. In order to make attractive to the general public the work of local artists, an annual exhibition called the Bydgoszcz Salon, in reference to the Paris Salon, was established in 1936.

From 1934 until 1939, the management of the museum was associated with the Artistic and Cultural Council in Bydgoszcz (Polish: Rada Artystyczno-Kulturalna w Bydgoszczy), whose task was to coordinate and care for artistic and cultural activities in the city. On the eve of the outbreak of World War II, the Bydgoszcz Municipal Museum was an important art center, the seat of many cultural and artistic societies and a meeting place for the cultural activists.

=== Period of the German occupation (1939–1945) ===
Just before the invasion of Poland, a campaign to secure some of the museum pieces was carried out: the branch located at Chodkiewicza street moved the exhibits to the main building at the Market Square. Once occupied, Bydgoszcz was taken over by German administration which designated a new Museum curator, Willem Drost from Gdańsk. In 1940, the post of director was taken over by the former collection custodian, Konrad Kothe and the custodian position remained to Kazimierz Borucki. In September 1939, Polish hostages -including Catholic priests- were publicly shot, lined up along the walls of the museum and the Church of St. Ignacy Loyola. In the spring of 1940, Nazi authorities pulled down the entire western frontage of the Old Market Square, thus razing the tenement house housing the museum: collections were moved to a pawnshop building at Pocztowa street.

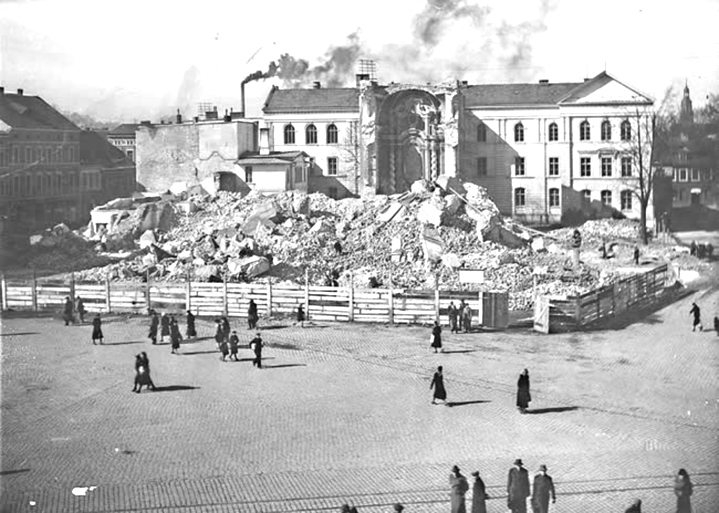
Razing of the western frontage of the old market square in March 1940

During the war, weapons, numismatics and paintings were added to the museum's collections, handed over by Bydgoszcz citizens threatened by the German authorities. Throughout the occupation, about 1,500 items were acquired (gifts or purchases), including some exhibits that the Historical Society of the Noteć Region recovered from Berlin. To some extent, minor exhibitions were conducted (seven exhibitions between 1941 and 1944).

Thanks to the activities of both Konrad Kothe (the German director) and Borucki (custodian), a number of art pieces were salvaged from destruction, especially sacred items: some religious objects from the city temples were hidden in the museum, while some were placed in hiding places in secret compartments or hidden among office furniture. In this way, the most precious items of the city were saved, among others:

- The Image of Our Lady of Beautiful Love of the cathedral;
- Maksymilian Piotrowski 's paintings, St. Ignatius of Loyola and Immaculate Conception of the Virgin Mary from the Church of St. Ignacy Loyola, before its destruction in 1940;
- a painting from the basilica of the Blessed Virgin Mary of the Immaculate Conception of the monastery of Górka near Łobżenica.

Thanks to Kothe's intervention, many valuable objects avoided appropriation and transportation to Nazi Germany.

In 1943–1944, to shelter collections from bombing, several objects were scattered to nearby towns: Dębowo, Kawęcin, Kiełpin, Luszkówko, Lachowice, Mała Komorza, Morsk, Piotrkówko, Pobórka Mała and Trzciniec. Only a small numbers of the exhibits survived the movement and war chaos. Warfare, robbery and estate devastations resulted in the loss of 58 chests with archaeological relics, five chests from the African collections and an unidentifiable number of militaria, city souvenirs, handicraft products and numismatic items.

=== Post war period ===
After Bydgoszcz liberation, the city authorities moved the seat of the museum into the 19th century edifice located at 4 Gdańska street, which had harboured until 1937 a 70-bed Municipal Hospital and from 1938 to 1945 the Municipal Department of Social Welfare (Polish: Wydział Opieki Społecznej Urzędu Miejskiego).

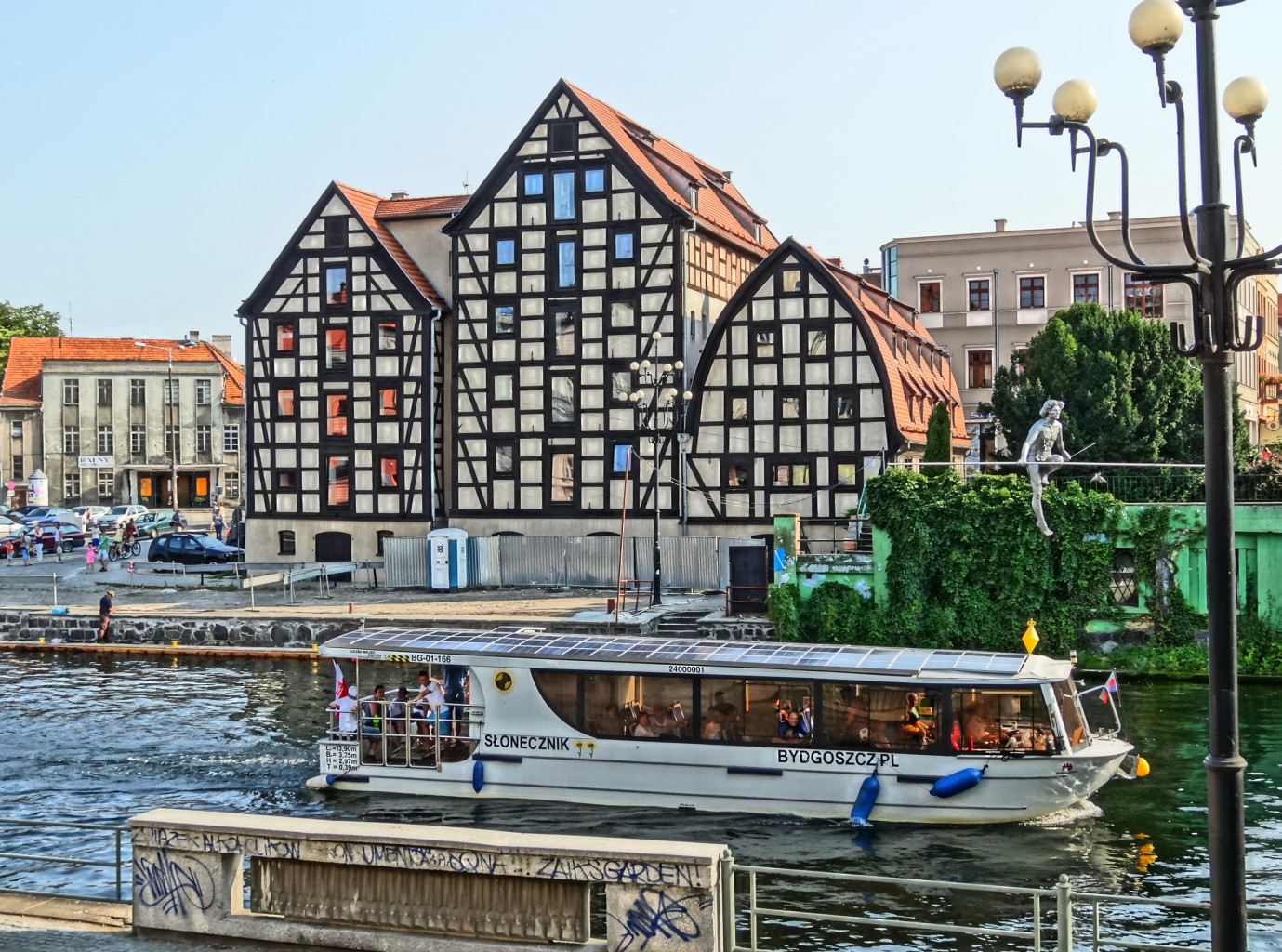
The granaries on the Brda river housing part of the museum collections

On 11 April 1946 the City Museum was opened in the new building and named after Leon Wyczółkowski. Kazimierz Borucki, ex-museum custodian, was appointed director of the institution. At the time, the first floor was used as a picture gallery, while city memorabilia and archaeological relics were located in ground floor rooms. In the 1940s, a public call to recover Museum items lost during the war was carried out, which helped to gather back several historic objects disseminated. In 1949, the museum was nationalized and in 1975, was transformed into a District Museum, covering the entire area of the newly created Bydgoszcz Voivodeship.

As time passed, it was necessary to expand Museum capacity with new buildings to fit the growing number of exhibits. Several solutions were considered. One of them was to build a new seat of the museum as part of an ambitious plan, designed by Włodzimierz Padlewski (1903-2007) from Sopot, to rebuild the lost western frontage of the Old Market Square: unfortunately, this project was never implemented. The solution adopted by city authorities lay in using the ancient watermills on Grodzka Street: a comprehensive renovation, ended in July 1964, aimed at suiting the needs of the museum. The buildings were then handed over to the latter in 1975.

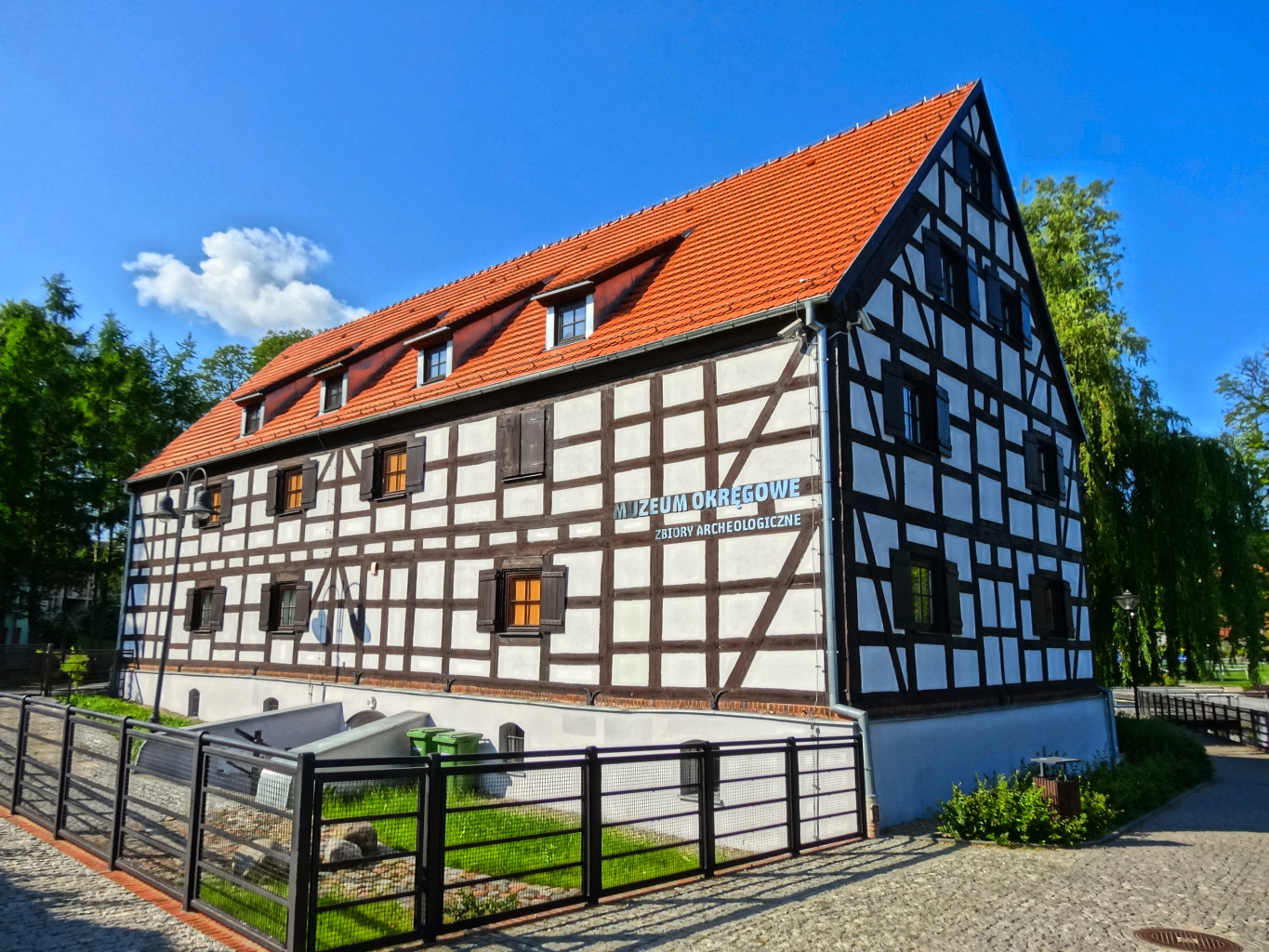
the White Granary on Mill Island

In the post-war period, mainly collections grew in quality and quantity, be it historical items related to the past of the city or artistic and guild craftsmanship, numismatic and archaeological collections. In particular, the museum constituted a collection of contemporary Polish art with a significant role on the national cultural landscape.

After 1990, the museum was taken over back by municipal authorities. From 1993 on, several granaries across the town have been used: those on the Brda river welcome exhibitions related to the history of Bydgoszcz, while in the White Granary on Mill Island (Polish: Wyspa Młyńska), a permanent craft exhibition has been presented. Between 1993 and 2006, a major renovation was carried out upon the granaries in Grodzka street, while the refurbishment of the buildings on Mill Island were covered by the program of Renovation of cultural heritage facilities on Mill Island (2006-2008).

On 9 August 2008 the institution was awarded the Silver Medal "For Merit to Culture Gloria Artis".

On 30 December 2009, by decision of the Ministry of Culture and National Heritage, the District Museum-"Leon Wyczółkowski" in Bydgoszcz was listed on the State Register of Museums (Polish: Państwowy Rejestr Muzeów).

== Museum departments and branches ==
=== Development of museum departments ===
By 1958, the museum managed four departments:

- Polish art, collecting paintings, graphics and sculptures from the 19th and 20th centuries;
- Leon Wyczółkowski, covering paintings, graphic works and the equipment of the artist's studio and personal mementoes;
- Archeology, gathering relics from excavations in Bydgoszcz and its region;
- History, including exhibits related to the city's past, such as artifacts, products of craftsmanship, coins and medals, military items and photographs.

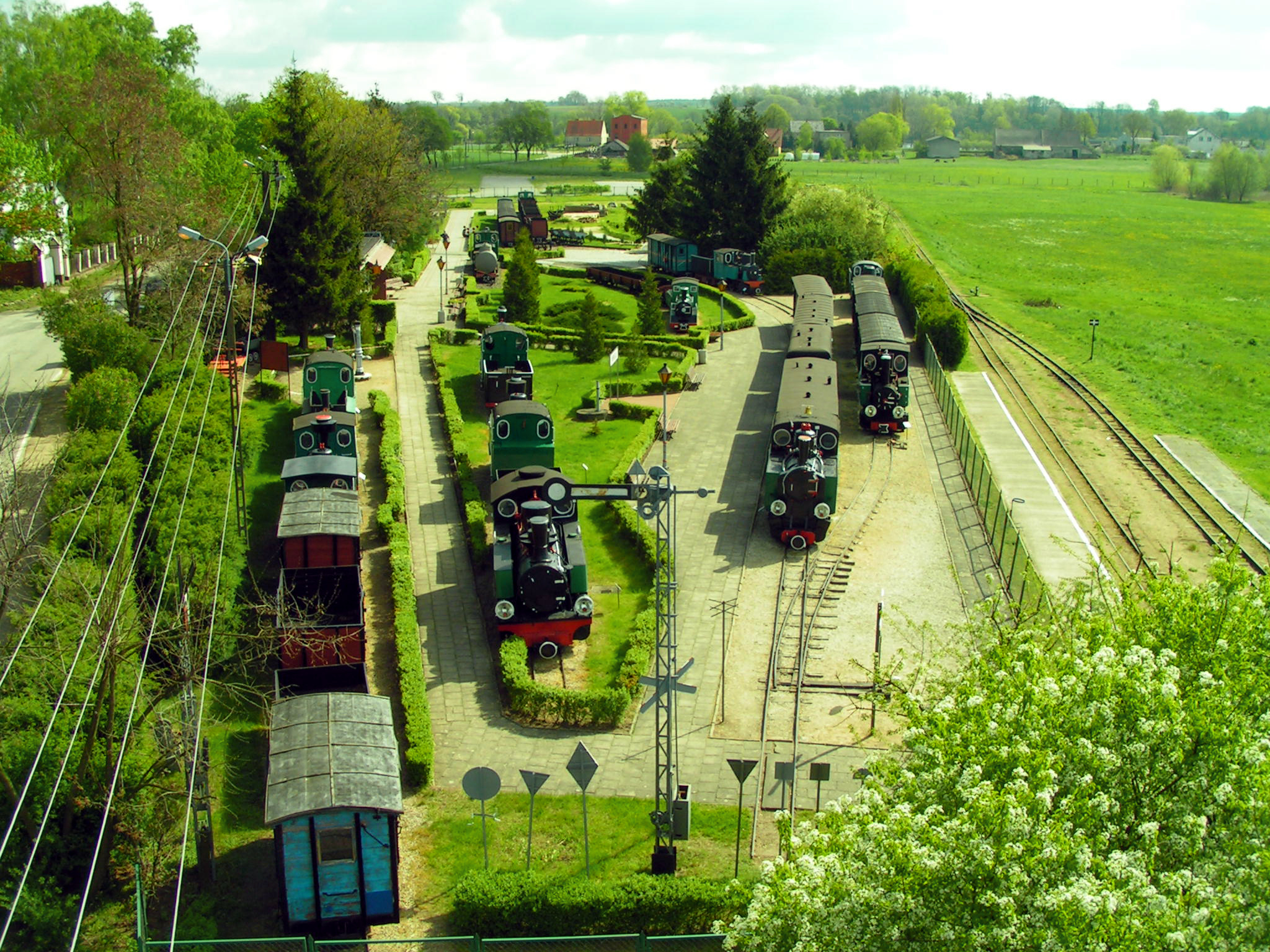
Narrow Gauge Railway Museum in Wenecja

In 1968, the Department of Polish Art was divided into:

- the Department of Contemporary Art, covering painting, graphics and sculpture by contemporary Polish artists;
- the Department of Modern Art, which collected Polish and foreign painting, as well as 19th and 20th century graphics and sculpture. The Leon Wyczółkowski section was associated with this department.

In 1966, the Numismatics section was detached from the History Department and became a department on its own. The same happened a few years later for the Graphics section, leaving the Art Department. The latter was only constituted by the Ethnography and Music sections.

Other departments and laboratories in the museum were vital to the proper functioning of the institution, inter alia, Familiarizing and Education, Inventory, Conservation, Library and workshops. After being upgraded to District Museum in 1975, three branch offices were added afterwards:

- The Forest Museum in Tuchola (established in 1980);
- The Narrow Gauge Railway Museum in Wenecja near Żnin (established in 1972, added in 1978);
- Pałuki Regional Museum in Żnin (from 1979).

After 1989, all these local branches were returned to the hands of local authorities.

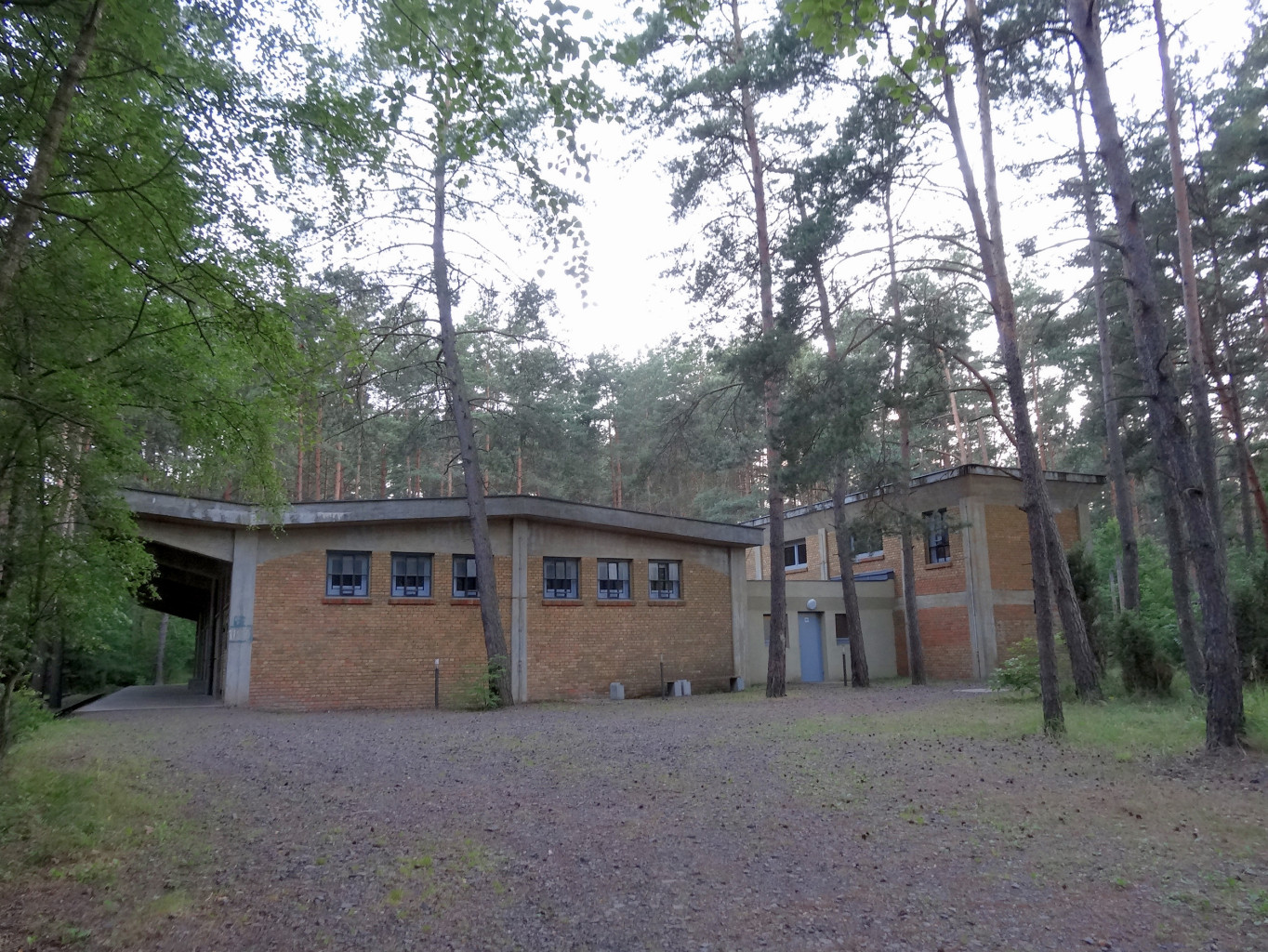
One of the Exploseum buildings

=== Open-air museum of industrial architecture ===
In autumn 2007, the museum in Bydgoszcz took over a complex of Nazi-factory buildings, located in the forest, in the south-east of the city. The ensemble of buildings was built during World War II in order to produce explosives and ammunition for the German war effort. The complex used the forced labor of thousands of prisoners of war from all over Europe, under the supervision of German specialists.

The most valuable part of the complex is NGL-Betrieb, where the nitroglycerin plant stands. The individual buildings are still preserved and connected by a near-2 kilometres (1.2 miles) long network of overground and underground tunnels. In 2009–2011, a project was launched to revive the area, called Open-air museum of industrial architecture with an underground tourist route and the museum of Armaments Works DAG Fabrik Bromberg. The outcome of the programme was the creation of the Exploseum, an open-air museum of industrial architecture combined with a museum of 20th century technology.

== Museum patron ==
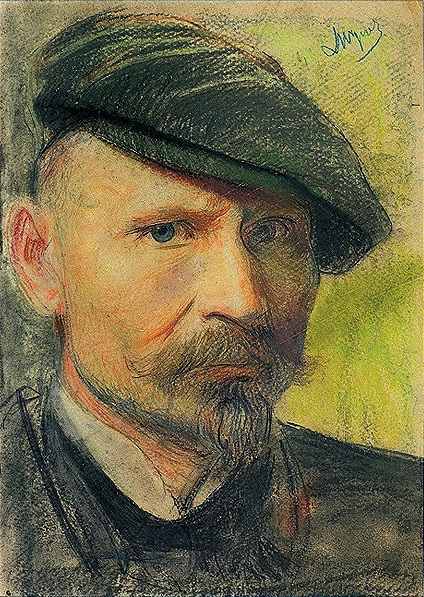
Selfportrait of Leon Wyczółkowski in flat cap

The patron of the museum lived during the interwar period in Bydgoszcz and Gościeradz, where he was buried at the parish cemetery. At the artist's death, his wife Franciszek Wyczółkowska, according to his will, handed over the artistic works legacy to the Museum of Bydgoszcz on 8 April 1937: 425 paintings, graphics, drawings, personal mementoes and studio paraphernalia.

On the 94th anniversary of Leon Wyczółkowski's birth (11 April 1946), the District Museum in Bydgoszcz officially adopted the artist as its patron.

== Buildings in Bydgoszcz ==
The museum collections and branches are located in the following places in the city:

Nr	Building	Address	Erection date	Joining the museum	Remarks	Picture
1.	Building of the District Museum in Bydgoszcz	4 Gdańska Street	1878	1945	Seat of the museum. The entire building is being refurbished and expanded in 2020.	
2.	Granary on the Brda river	9 Grodzka Street	1793–1800	1964	Permanent and temporary exhibitions.	
3.	Granary on the Brda river	11 Grodzka Street	1793–1800	1964	Permanent and temporary exhibitions.	
4.	White granary on Mill Island	2 Mennica Street	1789–1799	1997	Since 2009, it houses the archeological collection.	
5.	Red granary on Mill Island	8 Mennica Street	1861	1975	Since 2009, it houses the Modern Art gallery.	
6.	Leon Wyczółkowski's house	7 Mennica Street on Mill Island	1899–1902	1975	Former residential facility for the members of the management board of abutting Rother's Mills. Since 2009, it houses a permanent exhibition of the works and the studio of Leon Wyczółkowski.	
7.	European Museum of Money	4 Mennica Street on Mill Island	1786	1975	Classicist house from the early 19th century, it was used as a residential house for employees of the mill administration until the 1990s. Since 2009, it houses the numismatics collections.	
8.	Museum Education Centre	8 Mennica Street on Mill Island	1774	1979	The house has been built for the administration of the mills, then rebuilt at the end of turn of the 19th century. Since 2009, it houses a number of educational activities (lessons, workshops, lectures, meetings with authors, field games, shows and museum presentations).	
9.	Dutch Granary	7 Grodzka Street	Prior 1793	1998	Since 2011, it houses a permanent exhibition about Bydgoszcz history, From the Old Market Square to Wolności Square. A walk through the streets of Bydgoszcz during interwar.	
10.	Exploseum	1 Alfred Nobel Street	WWII	2011	The refurbished industrial ensemble presents the DAG Fabrik Bromberg, one of the largest armaments facility of the Third Reich built in occupied Poland, along with an underground tourist route.	
11.	Pharmacy museum Under the swan	5 Gdańska Street	1853	2017	The Pod Łabędziem pharmacy was founded in 1853. In 2003, a private pharmacy museum was established here. In 2017, the pharmacy collections became part of the collection of the District Museum. The former museum was closed to visitors in order to adapt the rooms and create a permanent exhibition.	

== Museum collections ==
=== Archeology department ===
Location: White granary

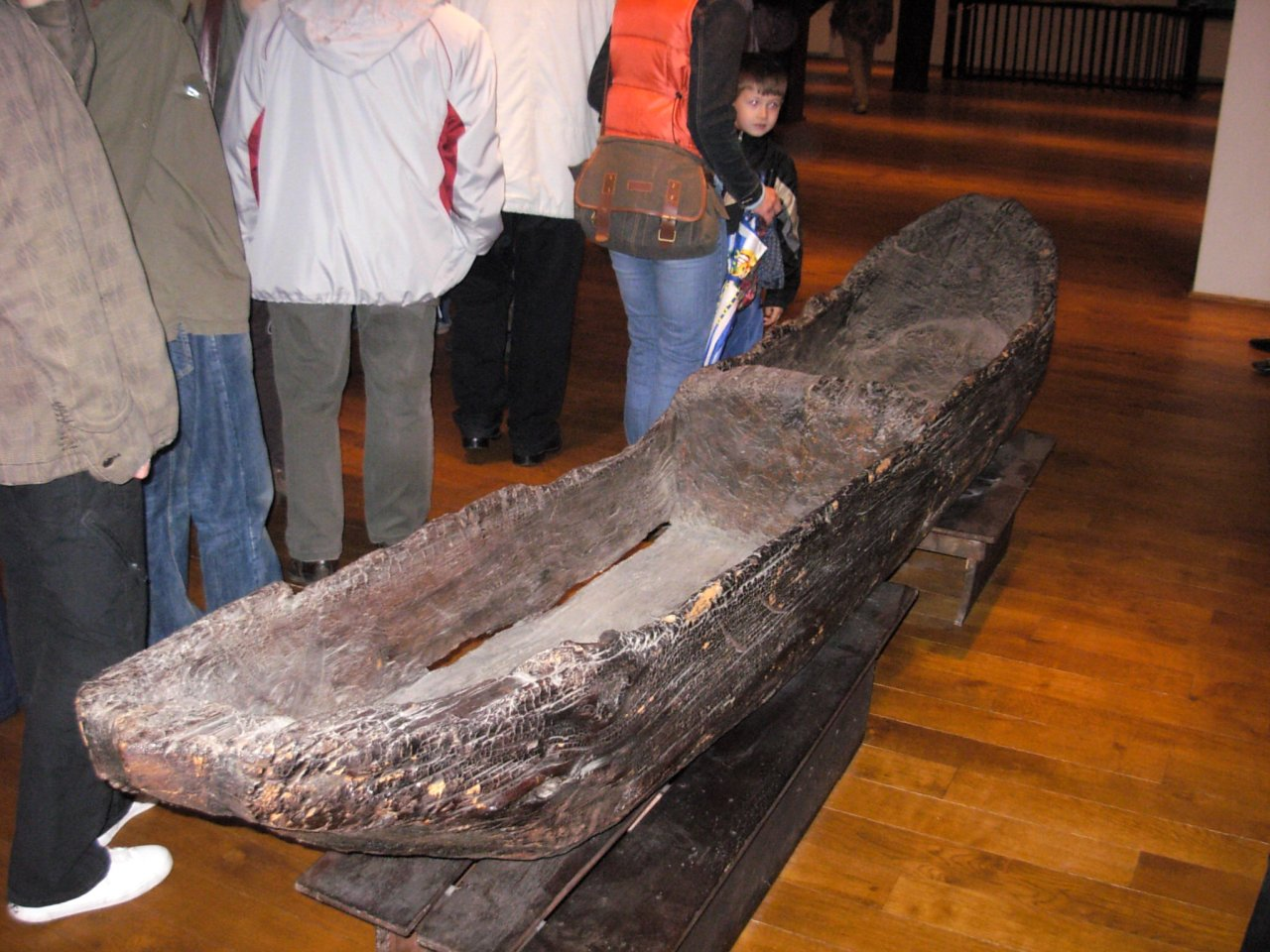
Dugout canoe ca 2000 BC

The section gathers objects of Bydgoszcz and its region dating from the Stone, Bronze and Iron Ages, Roman and Medieval Ages. The most interesting monuments are exhibits from the Stone Age, such as: bone blades, hoes made of reindeer horn, harpoon heads, clay funnel cups and a fragment of a dugout canoe from 2000 BC.

Among the early medieval items, several thousand come from Slavic strongholds of Bydgoszcz and surroundings (old town, ancient strongholds, Nakło nad Notecią, Więcbork). One can notice a fragment excavated in 2007 of the city burgwall from the 11th century, 20 metres (66 ft) long, 18 metres (59 ft) wide and 2.5 metres (8.2 ft) thick: it is a unique piece in such a scale in Pomerelia or Kujavia and one of the best preserved.

=== Ethnography department ===
Location: White granary

The department, established in 1986, displays collections of folk culture and art, mainly from ethnocultural regions of Pałuki, Kujavia, Krajna, Tuchola Forest, Kashubia and Kociewie. There are around 3000 items registered, mainly craft exhibits (blacksmithing, pottery, carpentry, basket weaving and plaiting).

=== Graphics department ===
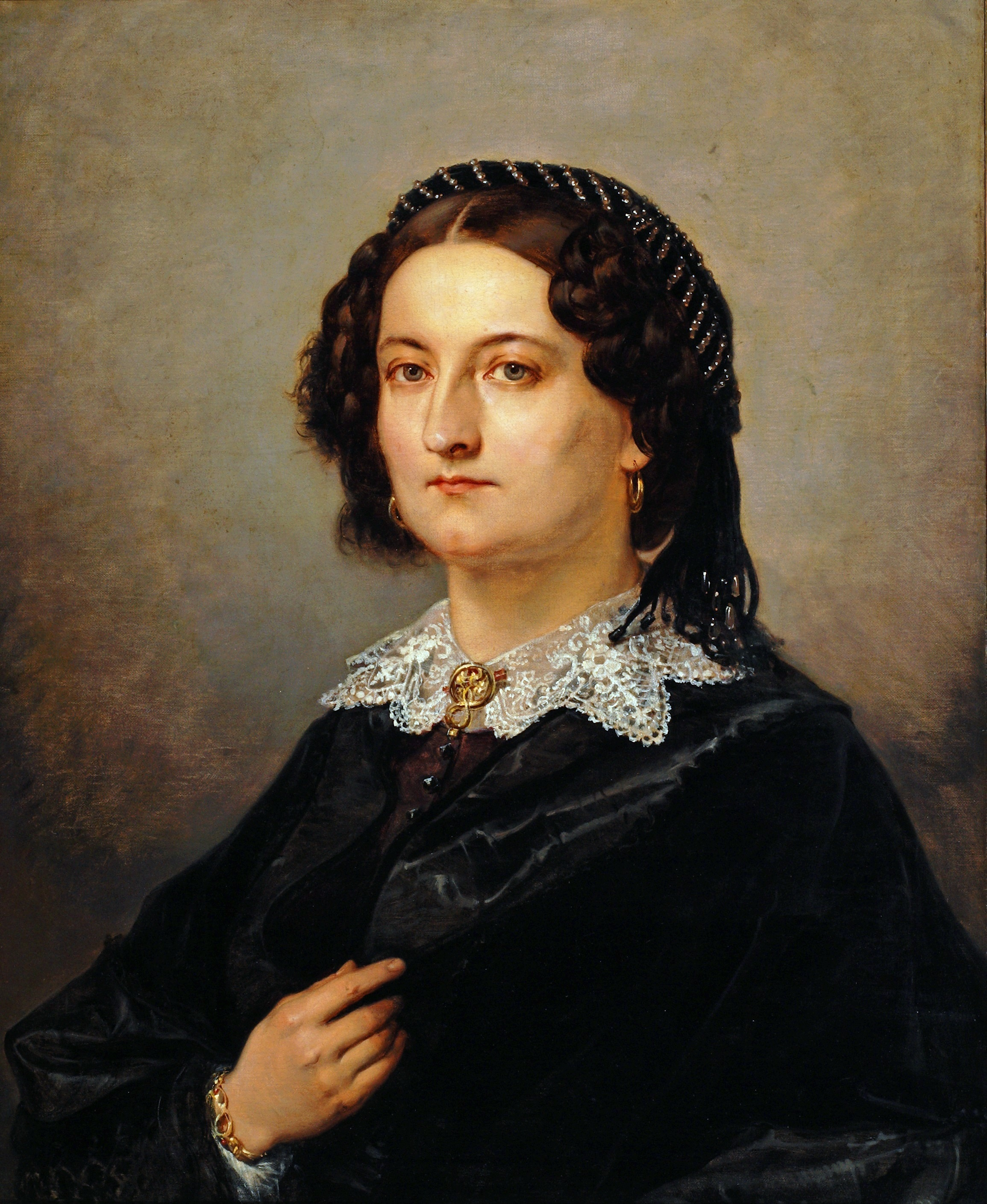
Portrait of Wiktoria Kosińska, by Jan Matejko (1859)

Location: Leon Wyczółkowski's house

The section was created in 1982. It contains approximately 13000 exhibits in several collections: old and contemporary Polish graphics, foreign graphics, bookplates, applied graphics, drawings and monotypings.

The largest section is the collection of Polish contemporary graphics (after 1945). A vast majority of displays come from Kraków, Warsaw, Poznań, Bydgoszcz and Toruń, to a lesser extent from Wrocław, Katowice, Łódź, Gdańsk or Lublin. Graphics from the Polish interwar period include works of Kraków and Warsaw art schools as well as Poznań's, Lviv's and Vilnius's. The oldest collections comprise works by 19th-century Polish artists: woodcuts and lithographs from Warsaw, Lviv and Vilnius.

The collection of foreign graphics covers mainly works by German, French and English artists from the 16th to the 20th century. Graphic charts, drawings and sketches are exhibited, in particular by authors like Walter Leistikow from Bydgoszcz, involved in the Berlin Secession art movement.

As long as drawings are concerned, an extensive collection of Bydgoszcz artists is represented. In addition, one can appreciate works of outstanding Polish painters, such as Piotr Michałowski, Jan Matejko and Maksymilian Piotrowski (authors associated with Bydgoszcz) and contemporary artists including, inter alia, Jan Cybis, Tymon Niesiołowski or Edward Dwurnik.

=== History department ===
Location: Dutch Granary

The department collects iconographic and photographic documents and materials related to the history of Bydgoszcz, together with militaria, phaleristics and handicraft items.

Among the oldest objects dealing with Bydgoszcz past, one can highlight: the oldest town seal preserved from the 16th-17th century, a 17th-century ceremonial sword of the Court of Justice, a unique silver insignia of a rifle brotherhood from the end of the 16th century and a 1590 bronze mortar cast in Gdańsk for the city oldest pharmacy Under the Golden Eagle (Polish: Pod Złotym Orłem), still standing today at No.1 Old Market square.

=== Music collections ===
This section created in 2005 gathers around 6000 objects: phonographic exhibits, publications, Edison and Pathé records and instruments (phonographs, gramophones and ancient radio receivers).

=== Numismatics collections ===
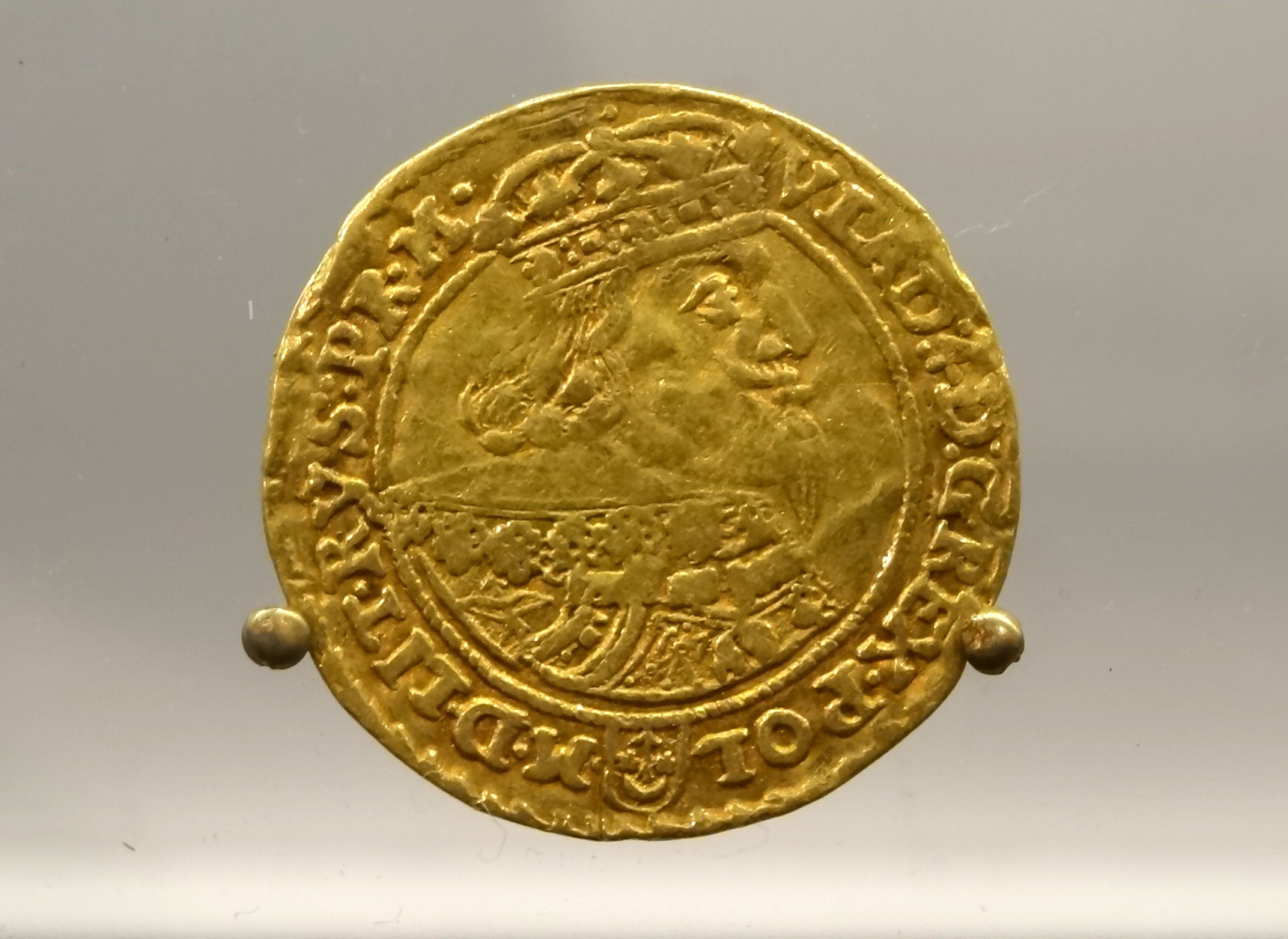
Ducat ca 1660

Location: European Museum of Money

The collections comprise coins, banknotes, medals and commemorative medals. The coin section gathers items from mints operating in Poland over the time, from the Piast era to modern times.

Some coins exhibited have been manufactured at the very place (1594–1688) on Mill Island: half-thalers, thalers, silver money from 1650 and two ducats from 1660. More than 400 specimens cover a collection of medals related to Bydgoszcz (from the 19th century to the present day).

The collection of banknotes includes, among others, the first Polish paper money released by the Supreme Council during the Kościuszko Uprising in 1794.

=== Art Department ===
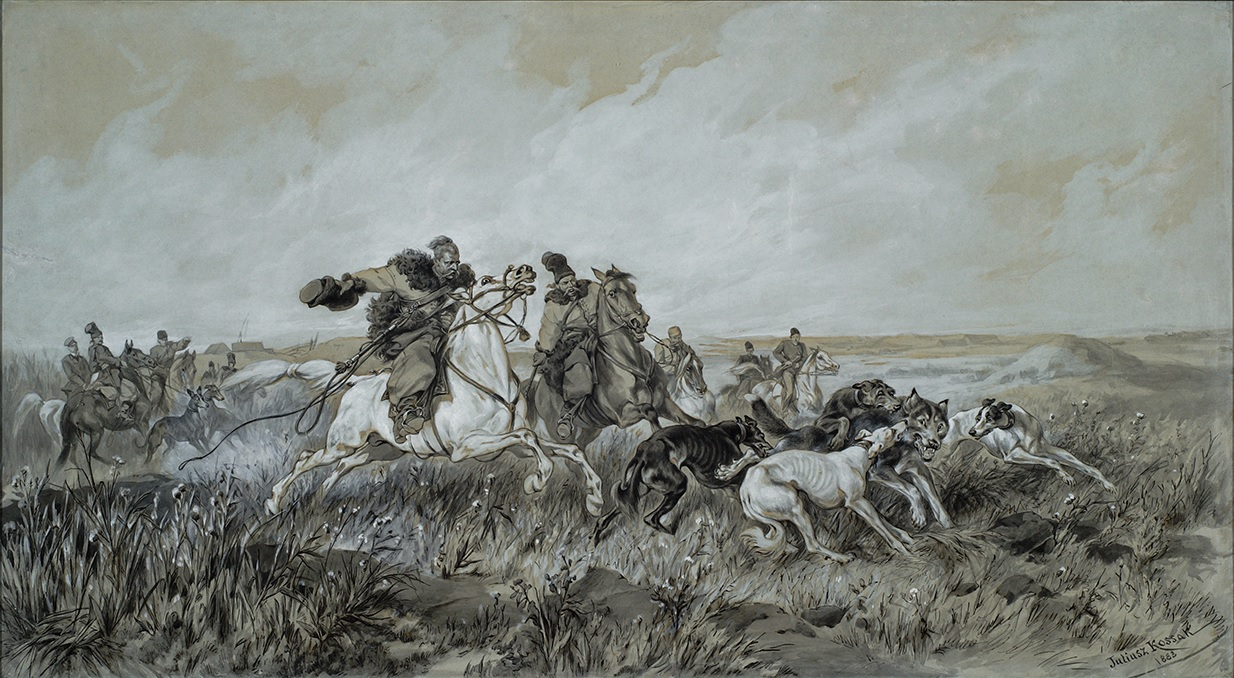
Wolf Hunting in the Steppe, Juliusz Kossak (1883)

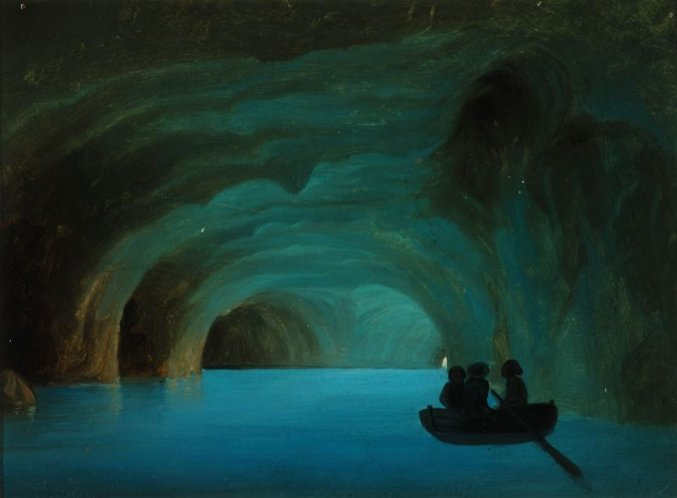
The Blue Grotto, Capri, Maksymilian Antoni Piotrowski (1843)

The department comprises the following collections:

- Old and contemporary Polish and foreign paintings;
- Sculptures;
- Reliefs;
- Design;
- Artistic photography.

The collection of old Polish painting includes works from the end of the 18th century to 1939, covering several styles It displays works by artists such as: Teodor Axentowicz, Józef Chełmoński, Daniel Chodowiecki, Olga Boznańska, Julian Fałat, Wojciech Gerson, Maurycy Gottlieb, Wlastimil Hofman, Władysław Jarocki, Juliusz Kossak, Franciszek Ksawery Lampi, Jacek Malczewski, Jan Matejko, Piotr Michałowski, Józef Pankiewicz, Władysław Podkowiński, Ferdynand Ruszczyc, Kazimierz Sichulski, Henryk Siemiradzki, Jan Stanisławski, Józef Szermentowski, Wojciech Weiss, Stanisław Wyspiański, Maksymilian Piotrowski, Stefan Filipkiewicz and Antoni Kozakiewicz.

Contemporary Polish painting is dominant in the museum, including in particular works by regional artists. One can find also foreign paintings by German, Italian, Dutch, Spanish and French painters. Worth noticing is the display of works from Walter Leistikow, born in Bydgoszcz and one of the co-founders of the Berlin Secession: the museum possesses Leistikow's largest collection in Poland.

In the sculptures section, one can appreciate exhibits from the 20th century, by artists such as: Xawery Dunikowski, Edward Haupt, Stanisław Horno-Popławski, Jerzy Jarnuszkiewicz, Antoni Kurzawa, Konstanty Laszczka, Ferdinand Lepcke, Władysław Marcinkowski, Adam Myjak, Olga Niewska, Edward Wittig, Aleksander Dętkoś and Bydgoszcz artists (Teodor Gajewski, Michał Kubiak and Piotr Triebler).

Other collections include small sculptural objects, plaques, cast medals and artistic photographs.

=== Department of Technology history ===
This section located at the Exploseum gathers documents related to the activity in Bydgoszcz of the Bromberg Dynamit Nobel AG Factory, exhibiting employee passes, tool tokens, everyday objects dealing with the plant operation. The collection also includes 300 zinc plates from the personal file of former factory workers.

The department displays also replicas of warfare: weapons and firearms from antiquity to modern times. A noticeable part of the collection has been digitalized, presenting oral history, with memories from the entire WWII period regarding the work at the Bydgoszcz factory. In addition, one can discover collections of items related to other technological domains: transport, environment and communication.

=== Department of Medecine and Pharmacy history ===
Location: 5 Gdańska Street

The core of the section comprises the exhibits purchased on 27 July 2017 from the private Museum of Pharmacy located in the ancient Pod Łabędziem Pharmacy at 5 Gdańska Street. This collection is mainly composed of items from western Poland and Germany, dating from the 17th to the end of the 20th century. The museum is planned to open end of 2020.

Various objects will be in display: vessels, mortars, weighing scales, laboratory equipment, pharmacy furniture, forms, documents on pharmaceutical and medical topics, packaging for medicines, postcards and medical tools.

One of the most valuable exhibit is the original galenic laboratory from the late 19th century, preserved in situ and unique in Poland. It originally produced drugs from plant, animal and mineral raw materials. The 1875 pharmacy furniture comes from the pharmacy Pod Łabędziem in Toruń. It was brought to Bydgoszcz at the beginning of the 21st century so as to replace the original furnishings, which was beyond repair after being nationalized in 1951.

=== Library ===
Location: 4 Mennica Street

Books and magazine collections date back to the 1880s. The most valuable item of the book collection from that period is the Jahrbuch der Historischen Gesellschaft für den Netzedistrikt zu Bromberg, from 1891–1895 (Yearbook of the Historical Society for the Netze District in Bromberg). The inventory of the library collections began in January 1925. In the 1960s, the collection was organized with an alphabetical and subject-systematic catalog and a catalog of periodicals. Since 2009, a computer catalog is also available.

== See also ==
- District Museum Building, Bydgoszcz
- Bromberg Dynamit Nobel AG Factory

== Bibliography ==
- (in Polish) Hojka, Zdzisław (2002). Muzeum Okręgowe im. Leona Wyczółkowskiego w Bydgoszczy. Kalendarz Bydgoski. Bydgoszcz: Towarzystwo Miłośników Miasta Bydgoszczy.
