= District Museum Building, Bydgoszcz =

District museum building in Bydgoszcz
- Polish: Budynek Muzeum Okręgowego w Bydgoszczy
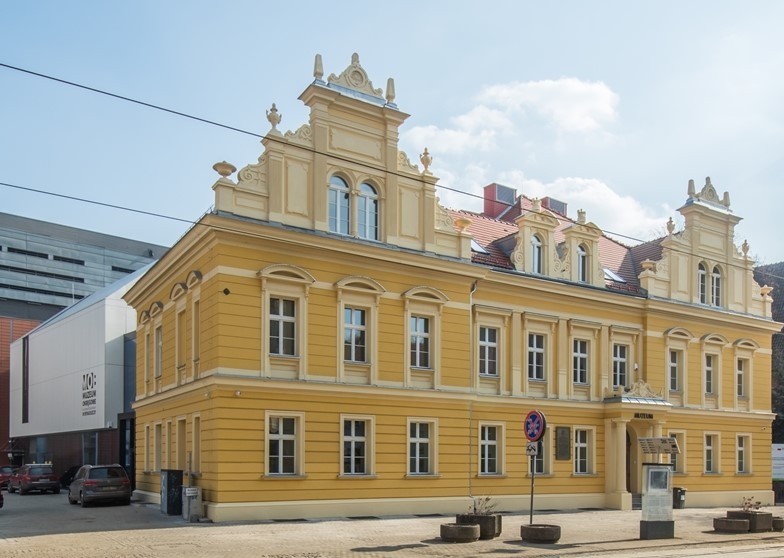
- View from Gdanska Street
- Interactive map of the District museum building in Bydgoszcz area

General information
- Architectural style: Renaissance Revival architecture, Mannerism
- Classification: Nr.601230, reg.A/278, 22nd Jan 1953, 12th May 1993
- Location: Bydgoszcz, Poland, 4 Gdanska Street
- Coordinates: 53°7′28″N 18°0′10″E
- Construction started: ca 1550
- Completed: 1618
- Renovated: 1878
- Owner: District Museum in Bydgoszcz

Technical details
- Floor count: 3

Design and construction
- Architect: Wilhelm Lincke

The District Museum Building in Bydgoszcz is an historical building in Bydgoszcz located at 4 Gdańska Street.

== Location ==
The building stands near Poor Clares' Church, in Bydgoszcz's downtown (Śródmieście) district.

== History ==
Historically, the building is associated with the 15th-century hospital and shelter Church of Holy Spirit. Originally it was only two wooden workhouses, located outside of the old city of Bydgoszcz, thus hindering potential transmissions of epidemic diseases.

A plaque mentioning the date of 1593 is still present at the ground floor of the actual building: it confirms that a brick-made hospital was still standing here at the end of the 16th century. In 1618, a new edifice has been erected: the convent of the Poor Clares in Bydgoszcz. This monastery built in 3 years (1615-1618), was close to the Poor Clares' ancient Church of the Holy Ghost. In the 17th century, with the expansion of the monastery, cloisters were constructed, connecting the monastery to the church of the Poor Clares. These cloisters were demolished at the end of the 18th century, when Bydgoszcz passed under the authority of the Kingdom of Prussia.

In 1830-1840, the monastery building was partly restored. According to a local account carried out in 1760, the monastery of the Poor Clares was reported to have a huge amount of goods: a distillery (from 1751), stables, coach houses, a brewery, a fish pond and gardens.

In January 1834, the Prussian authorities announced the secularization of the convent of Poor Clares, and in 1837 the monastery and the church became the property of the city of Bydgoszcz.

The monastery buildings were initially planned to become a school, but eventually a municipal clinic was established. Re-customized halls could accommodate 28 beds, and in the mid-19th century, building interiors were refurbished to fit the new needs of the hospital. Between 1861 and 1863, the dismantling of the cloister (and the gate attached) definitely separated the church from the former monastery building.

In 1878, Wilhelm Lincke, city building counselor, approved the addition of a wing along Gdanska street, with Renaissance Revival architecture and Mannerism style, like the adjoined street building facades. In 1937, the Municipal Hospital was accommodating 70 beds and was admitting 600 patients per year and at this date, it was transferred to another part of town. During the period 1938-1945, the building housed the Department of Social Welfare of the City.

The facility has been housing since 11 April 1946, the Regional Museum "Leon Wyczółkowski", then the administrative seat of Bydgoszcz museums, named after Leon Wyczółkowski. It displays a rich collection of works by the artist, and a valuable collection of contemporary art works throughout several sites in the city. The edifice has been refurbished and enlarged in 2020.

== Architecture ==
The building is a 3 stairs and two-winged structure. The main edifice has a Mansard roof. The front elevation displays bossages, and the portal is adorned with columns. Each wing and its slight avant-corps is topped with a gable and decorated pilasters.

The building has been registered on the Pomeranian Heritage List (Nr.601230-reg.A/278), 22 April 1953 and 12 May 1993.

== Gallery ==
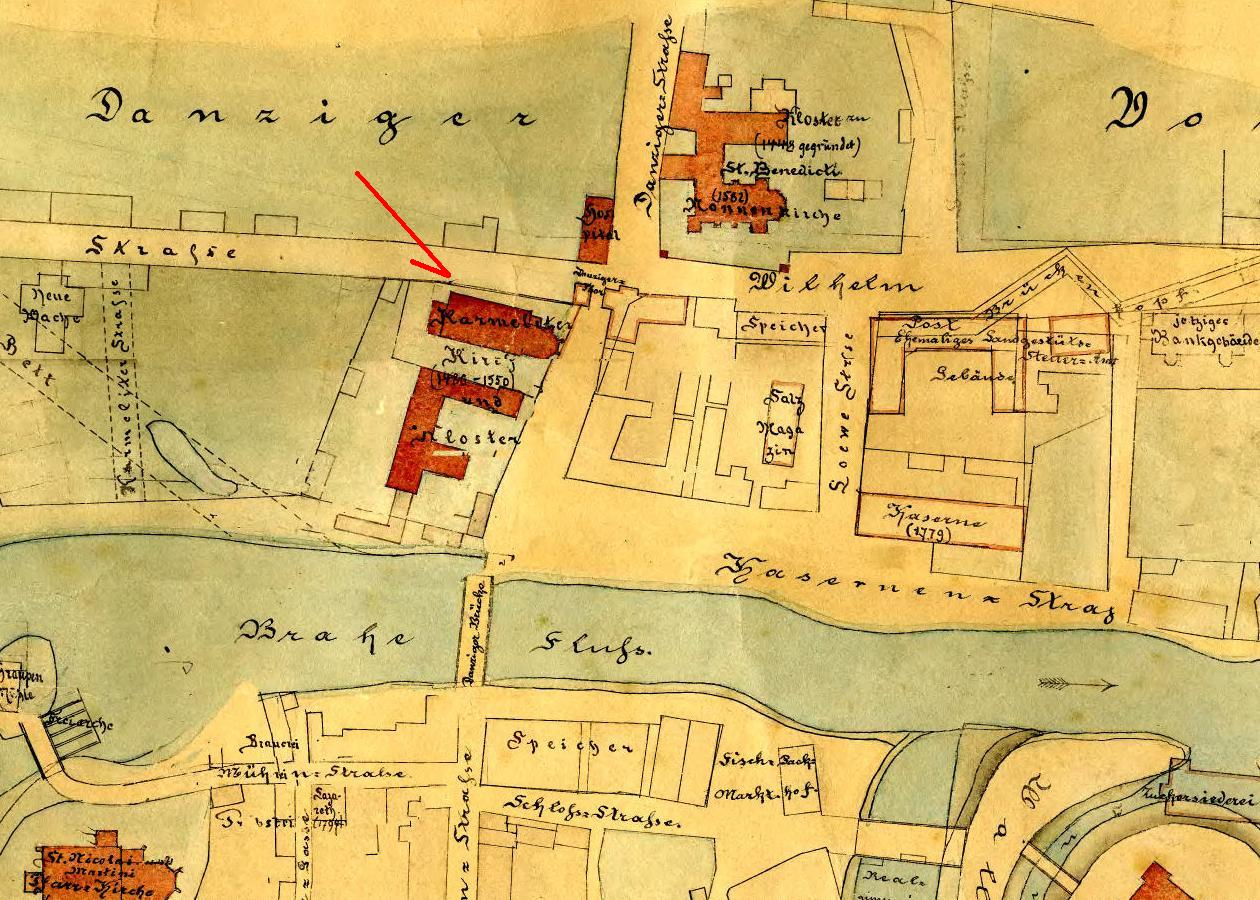
Plan of the monastery of 16th to 18th centuries - Drawing by Reichert and Emil Gustav Schulz in 1890. Poor Clares' Church and Monastery are at the top of the map.

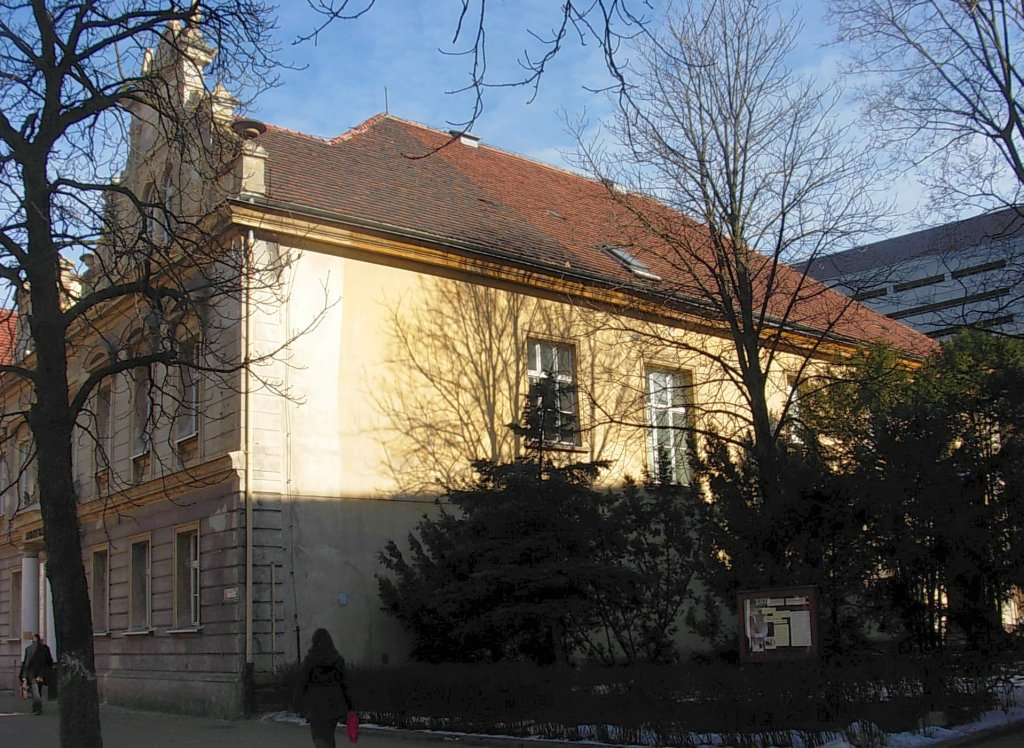
The former monastery building with its rebuilt façade.

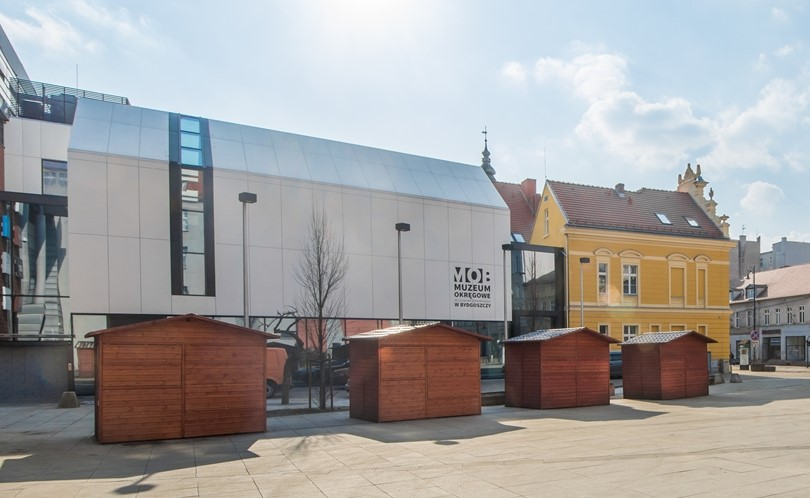
Side view after renovation

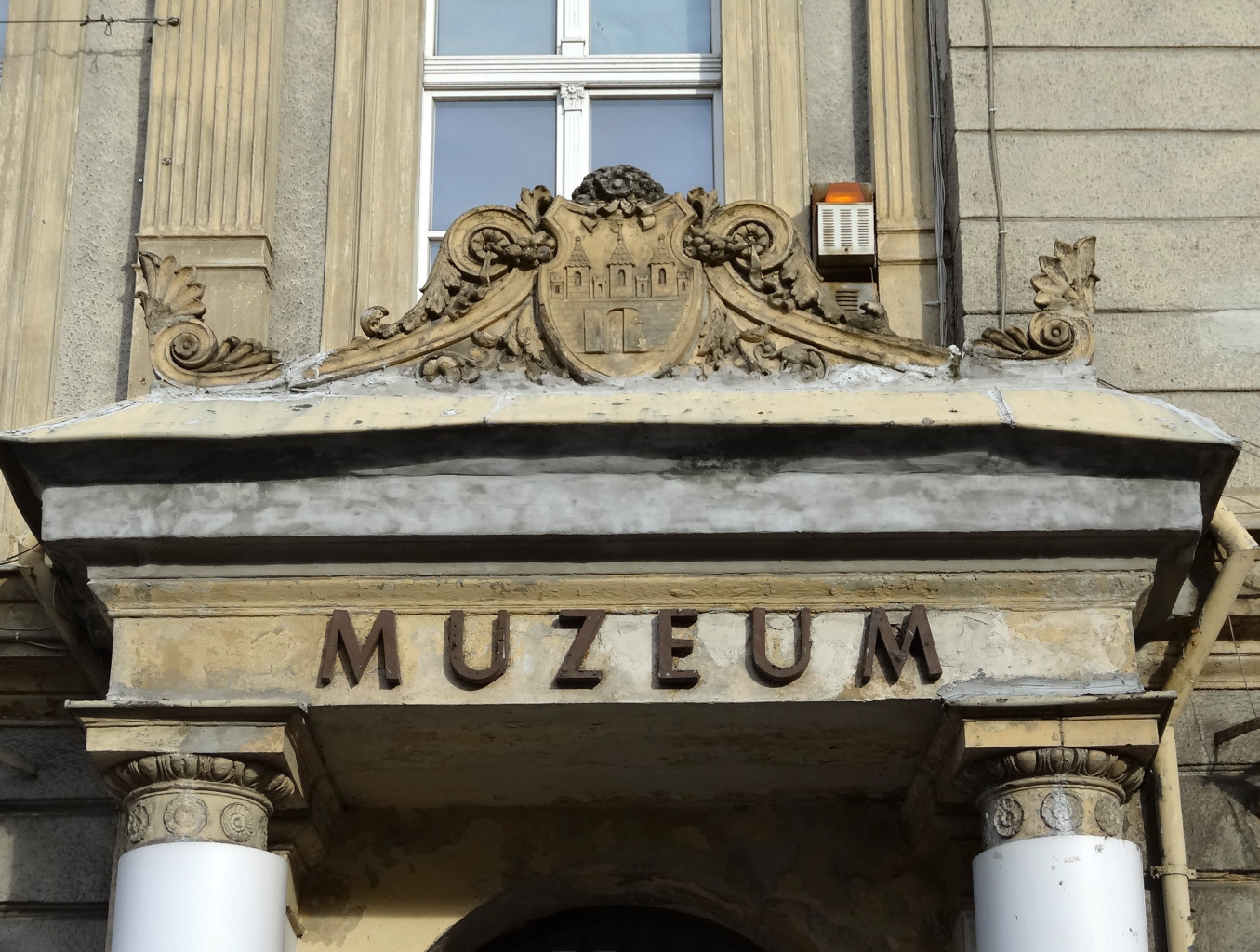
Detail of the entry gate, with Bydgoszcz coat of arms

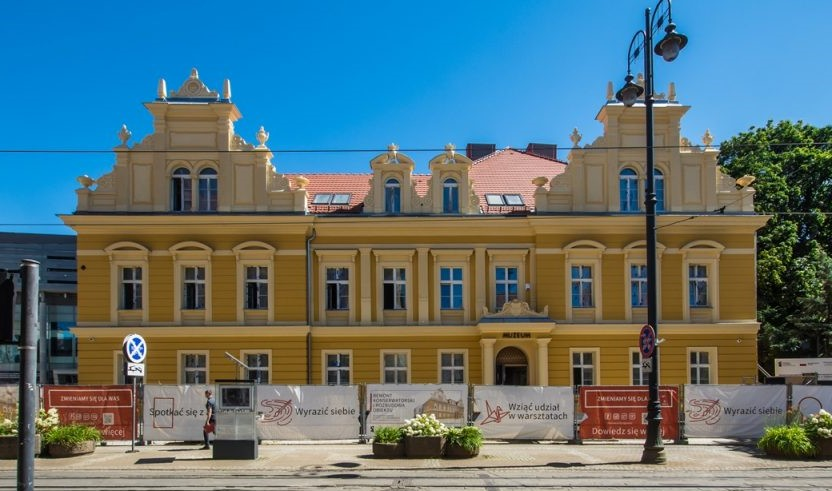
The building through renovation in 2020

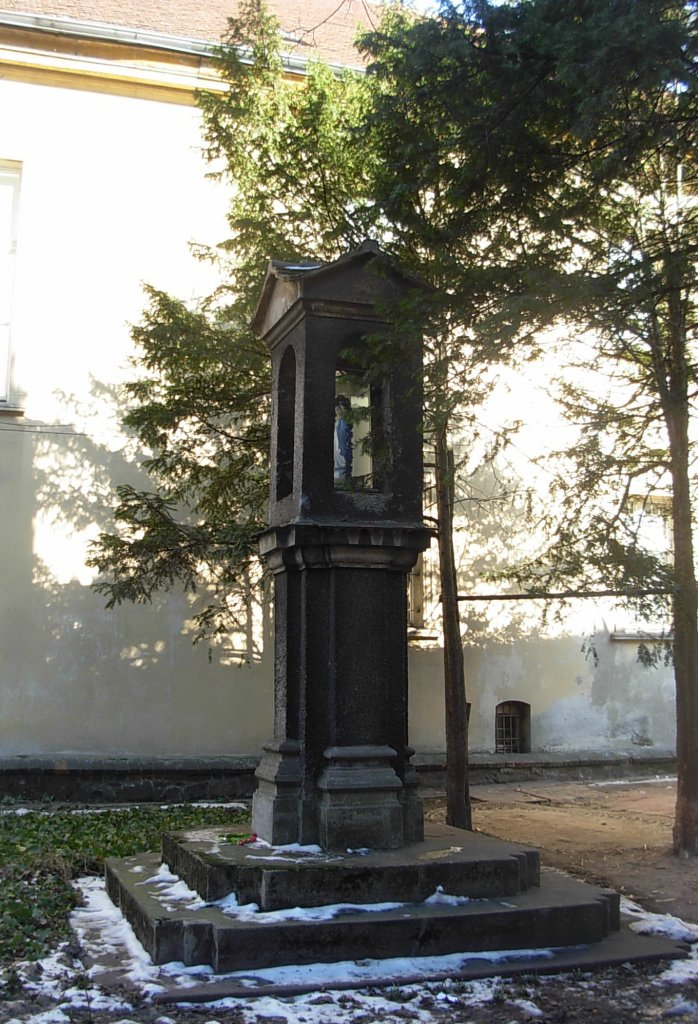
The chapel between Poor Clares' Church and former Poor Clare's convent.

== See also ==
- Bydgoszcz
- Gdanska Street in Bydgoszcz
- Poor Clares' Church, Bydgoszcz
- Regional Museum "Leon Wyczółkowski"
- (in Polish) Former Poor Clares' convent
- (in Polish) Downtown district of Bydgoszcz

== Bibliography ==
- http://muzeum.bydgoszcz.pl/en/
- (in Polish) Bartoszyńska-Potemska Albina: Dzieje i architektura kościoła i klasztoru Klarysek w Bydgoszczy. Prace komisji sztuki t. I: Bydgoskie Towarzystwo Naukowe. Prace Wydziału Nauk Humanistycznych. Seria D: 1965
- (in Polish) Bręczewska-Kulesza Daria, Derkowska-Kostkowska Bogna, Wysocka A.: Ulica Gdańska. Przewodnik historyczny, Bydgoszcz 2003
- (in Polish) Janiszewska-Mincer Barbara. Z dziejów klasztoru i kościoła Klarysek. Kalendarz Bydgoski 1985
- (in Polish) Jankowski Aleksander. Kościół Klarysek pod wezwaniem Wniebowzięcia Najświętszej Marii Panny w Bydgoszczy. Kronika Bydgoska – tom specjalny wydany z okazji wizyty papieża Jana Pawła II w Bydgoszczy. Bydgoszcz 1999
- (in Polish) Parucka Krystyna. Zabytki Bydgoszczy – minikatalog. „Tifen" Krystyna Parucka. Bydgoszcz 2008. ISBN 978-83-927191-0-6
