= Prevention Police Building =

- Polish: Budynek Prewencji Policji
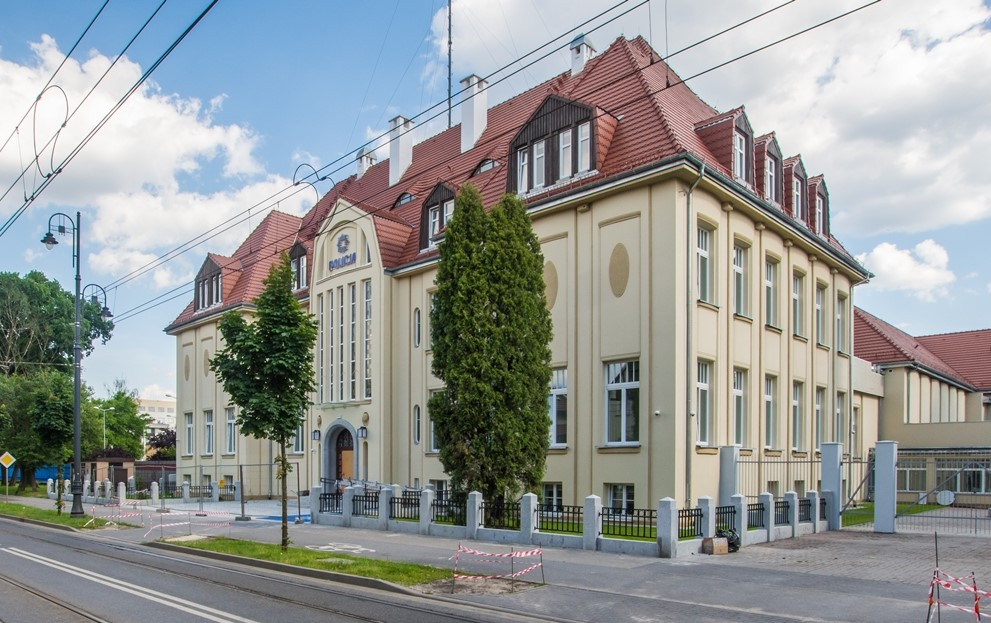
- Front view

General information
- Type: Former orphanage
- Architectural style: Historicism
- Classification: Nr.601267, Reg.A/1055, March 18, 1997
- Location: 32 Jana Karola Chodkiewicza Street, Bydgoszcz, Poland
- Coordinates: 53°7′52″N 18°01′21″E
- Completed: 1914
- Client: Municipal Police of Bydgoszcz

Technical details
- Floor count: 3

Design and construction
- Architect: Albert Schütze

The Prevention Police Building is a historical administrative building in Bydgoszcz, Poland. It was initially an orphanage. It is located on the southern frontage of Jana Karola Chodkiewicza Street, at No. 32, in the eastern edge of downtown Bydgoszcz. It is registered on the Kuyavian-Pomeranian Voivodeship Heritage List.

== History ==
=== Prussian period ===
Erected in 1914, the house was intended to house orphans. At the time, it was the second orphanage in Bromberg, the first being at 5 Romualda Traugutta (1907), and the sixth one in the contemporary German Empire.

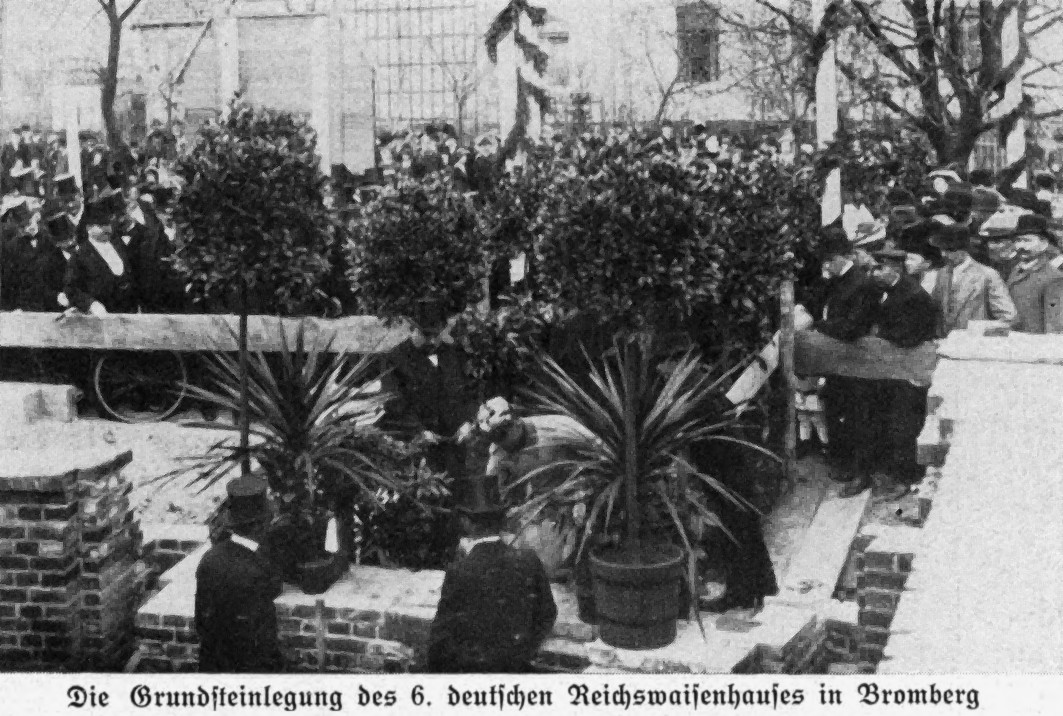
Laying of the foundation stone in 1913

The plot has been donated in 1910 by Prussian authorities. At the time, the building was located outside of the administrative borders of Bromberg, in the suburban municipality of Bielawy (German: Bleichfelde). It has been the only public education buildings in the area till the 1930s, when have been constructed Public School Ewaryst Estkowski in 1933 (at today's Poniatowskiego street 8) and the German Gymnasium Albrecht Dürer in 1938 (now at Chodkiewicza street 30).

Building design was created in 1912 by Albert Schütze' Studio in Magdeburg for two identical projects, in Bydgoszcz and Poznań. The initiator of the construction in Bromberg was the local branch of the Association of Charitable Society for the Care of Orphans, affiliated to the German Association of orphanages schools in East Prussia. Hans Wilhelm August von Waldow Reitzenstein, vice-major of Poznań, was the patron of the project. Due to financial shortage during the construction, initial plans were modified, cutting out architectural decoration items such as dormers, a middle tower, reliefs and adorned cartouche.

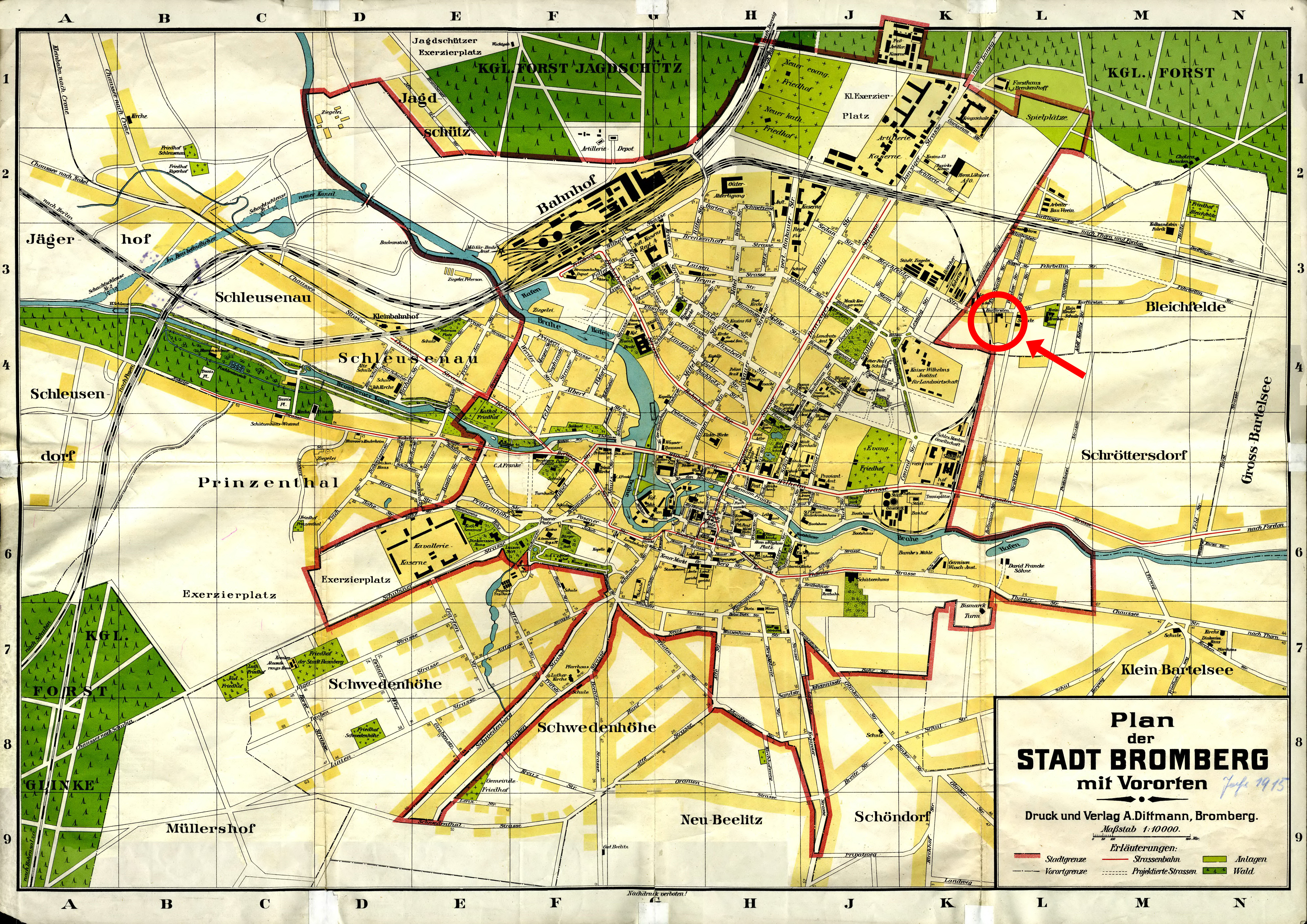
The orphanage on a 1914 map, outside city's limits

The official opening of the House of Orphans (German: Sechstes Reichs-Waisenhaus) took place on June 14, 1914. It was designed to host 17 girls and 33 boys, as well as the family of the caretaker in a separate apartment. In addition were built an adjacent sport hall and ancillary areas as a separate building. Outside the house was set a large vegetable garden and orchard (approx. 1 ha), ensuring a supply of vegetables and fruits: its area covered the entire block delimited today by streets Poniatowskiego, Chodkiewicza, Powstańczów Wlkp and Ogińskiego.

Children had also the opportunity to attend elementary schools in Bromberg. After graduation, they were trained on a craft workshop profession.

The German orphanage operated only 6 years, until 1920, with director Rudolf Seehafer. Its address was Kurfürsten straße 82, Bleichfelde

=== Interwar period ===
After January 1920, and the re-creation of the Polish State, the edifice had its street address renamed to 80 Senatorska street, then 80 Bronisław Pieracki street in the mid-1930s. The building was taken over by the municipality of Bydgoszcz: it initially housed the National Orphanage, and from 1923 the Institute for Eastern frontier inhabitants (also called Borderland Internat), running orphanages for the children of the former east lands of the Republic. It provided shelter for boys only, who were orphans after Bolshevik authorities interventions in the Kresy Zachodnie (eastern borderlands). In the facility Ludwik Regamey hold a concert at a banquet of the Borderland Internat, together with the dentist Idzi Świtała, in February 1921.

In 1936, the city Board took the institution over and allocated it for educational purposes: in July 1937, it exhibited art works donated by Leon Wyczółkowski and Konstanty Laszczka to the Municipal Museum. The initial sport hall was converted in the 1920s into a chapel, which hosted the parish of St. Vincent de Paul (est. May 1, 1924), until the start of the erection of St. Vincent de Paul basilica on Ossoliński Alley.

=== Period after 1945 ===
During World War II, the building was first used to hold Polish prisoners detained by the Gestapo, and then reconverted into a German military hospital. In 1945, the Red Army utilised the building for several months, in particular as a temporary camp for German prisoners. After 1946, a thorough refurbishment of the interiors created large rooms on each floor, the sport hall being divided into three separate offices.

These works allowed the billeting of the Służba Bezpieczeństwa, or Security Service of the Ministry of Internal Affairs, joined in 1956 by the Regional Headquarters of the State Militia. The latter organization moved in the 1970s to new buildings in Powstańców Wielkopolskich Alley. From 1980 onward, formations from the Riot Police, or ZOMO, were the only to be housed there.

The chapel in the old gym was re-open in 1945, and then reconverted into a public cinema, Gwardia ("Guards"), which ran till the early 1960s. Between 1960 and 1970, the erection of additional buildings modified the aspect of the original architectural complex.

Today, the building hosts Headquarters of Bydgoszcz Police and Provincial Riot police. Since the end of World War II, the entire city block, where the former orphanage's garden used to stand, has been used by Police organizations.

In 2017, city authorities have decided to renovate entirely the edifice. The project was completed in 2020.

== Architecture ==
=== Outside ===
The building is oriented East-West with a rectangular footprint. On the axis of the main elevation stands an avant-corps topped by a segmental arch. Two side wings act as avant-corps on facade extremities. The former sport gym stands behind the main edifice, seen from the Jana Karola Chodkiewicza Street.

The two-storey building has a usable attic, and a full basement. The complex architecture structure stands out by the diversity of its roofing. While several dormers shed light in the attic (in particular by using eyelid shapes), the back of the eastern wing, lower than the front building and covered with a flat roof, was originally a terrace. The former sport hall is today encased on three sides by 1960s additions, which completely hide its original shape.

The front elevation of the house is symmetrical, displaying a predominance of vertical lines such as windows or pilasters. The portal is crowned by an arch realised with sandstone segments. The original wooden door with a transom is towered by four vertical bars of stained glazing. The portal is flanked up by stuccoed busts of children (a boy on the right and a girl on the left), bringing to mind the initial function of the edifice.

=== Interiors ===
On the ground floor, original blueprint placed a dining room, a study, office rooms, technical areas and washrooms. In the basement there were a kitchen, storage rooms and showers, and on the first floor bedrooms, an infirmary, housing for orphanage supervisors, toilets and washrooms. The attic housed service premises (laundry, workshops, drying).

Today the main building has a long corridor giving access to all spaces. Large halls are present in both wings, the middle body possess an open staircase, lighted through the oblong glazing windows of the central avant-corps.

The edifice has been registered on the Kuyavian-Pomeranian Voivodeship Heritage List Nr.601267 Reg.A/1055, on March 18, 1997.

== Gallery ==
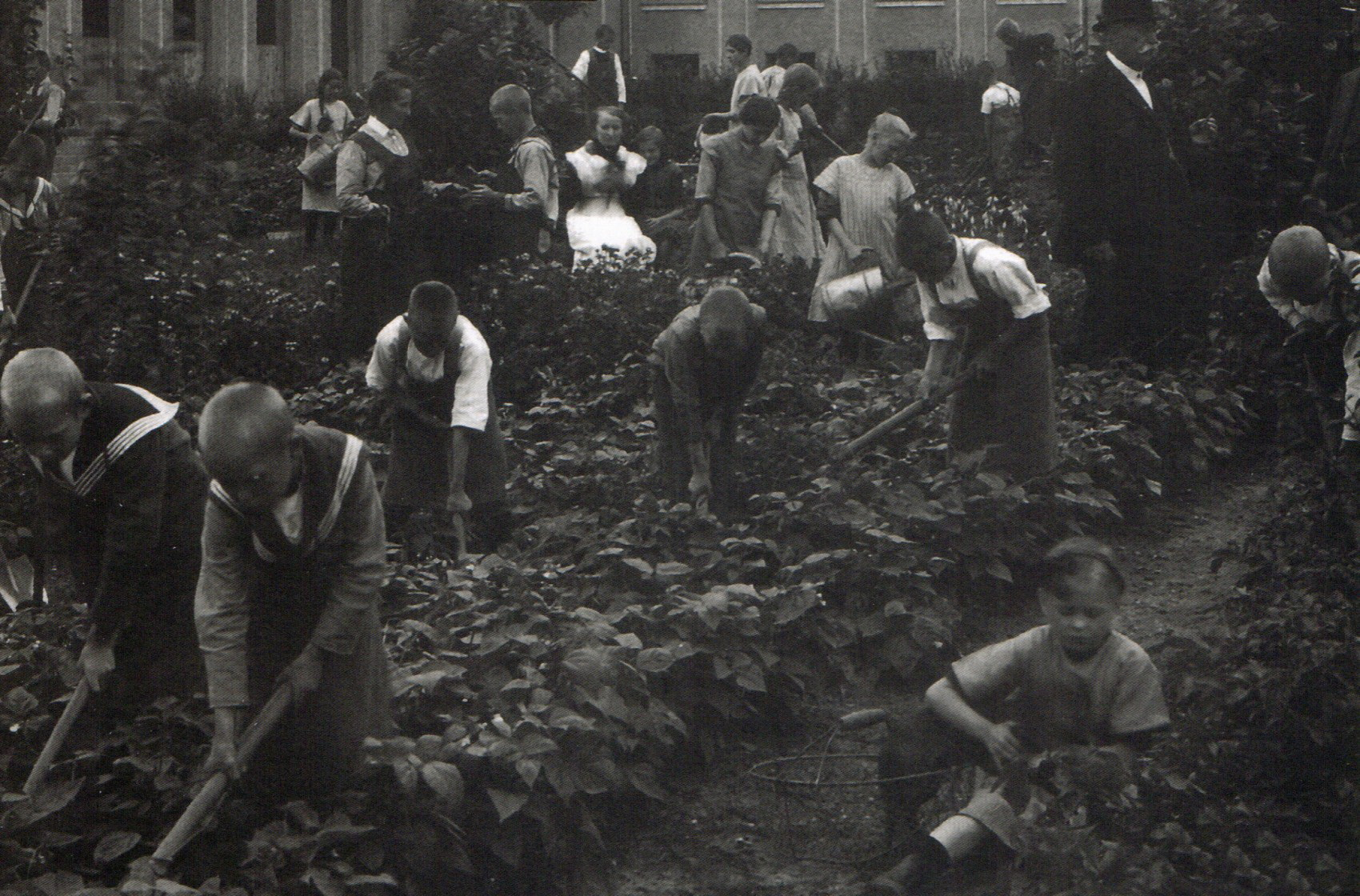
Orphanage's garden, c. 1929

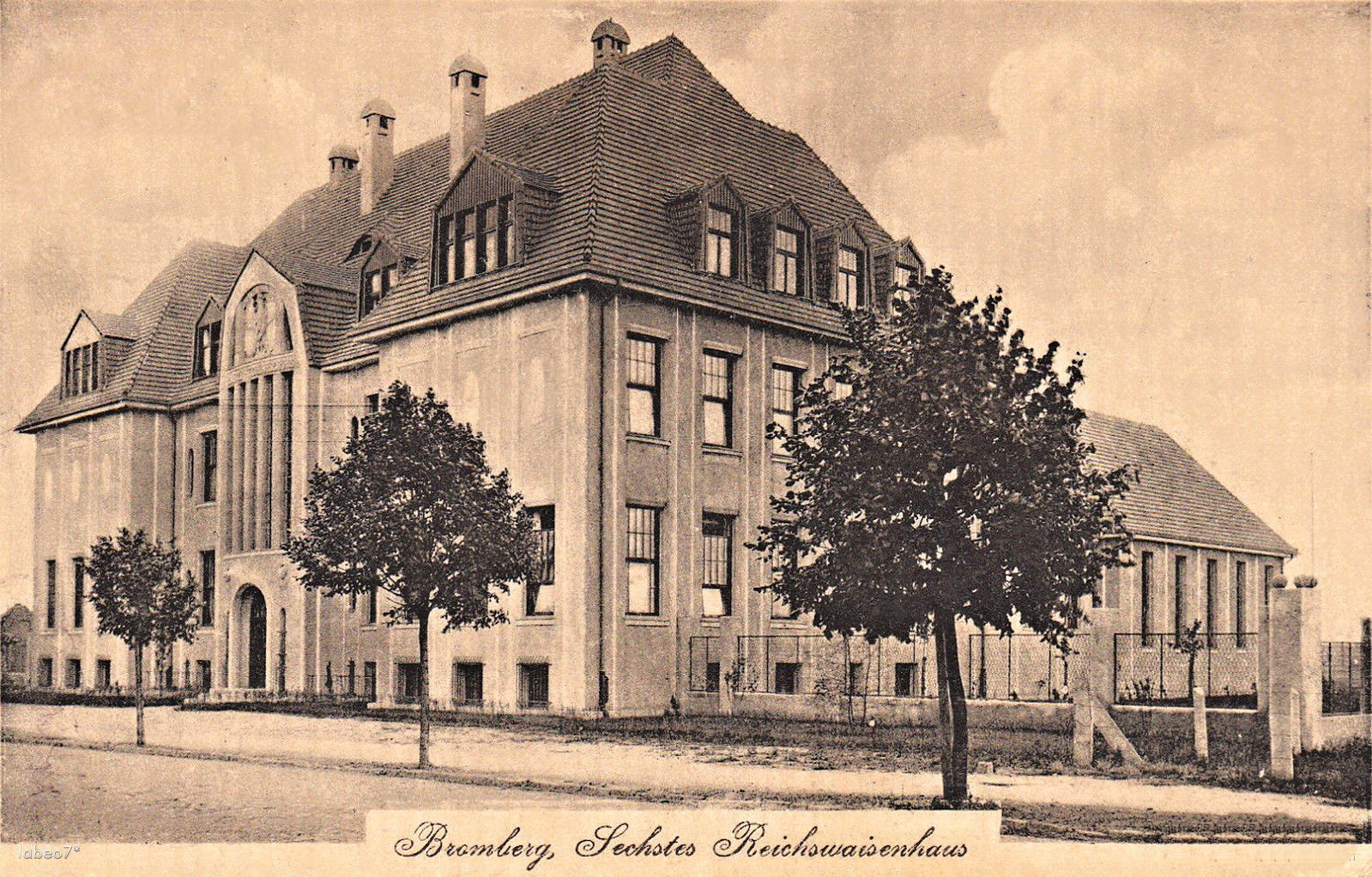
The building in 1916

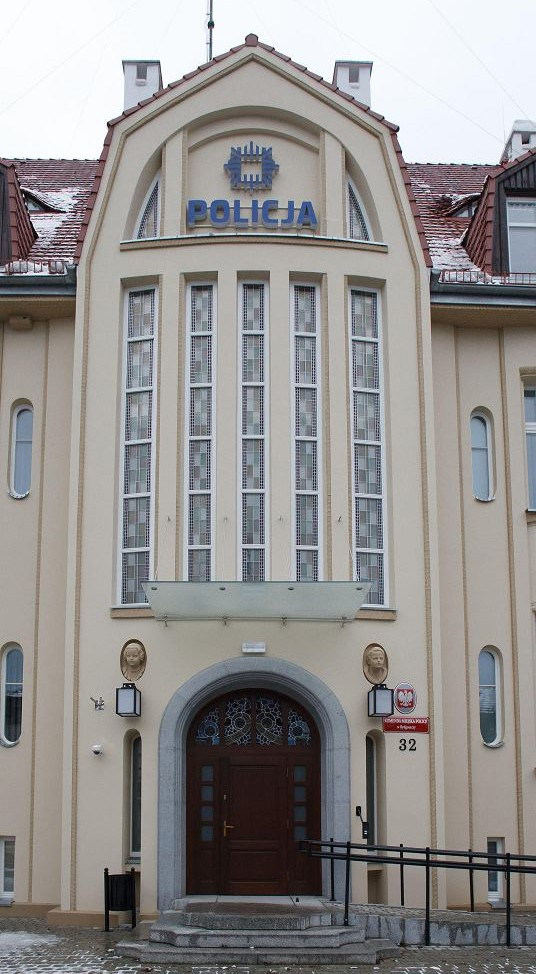
Middle avant-corps

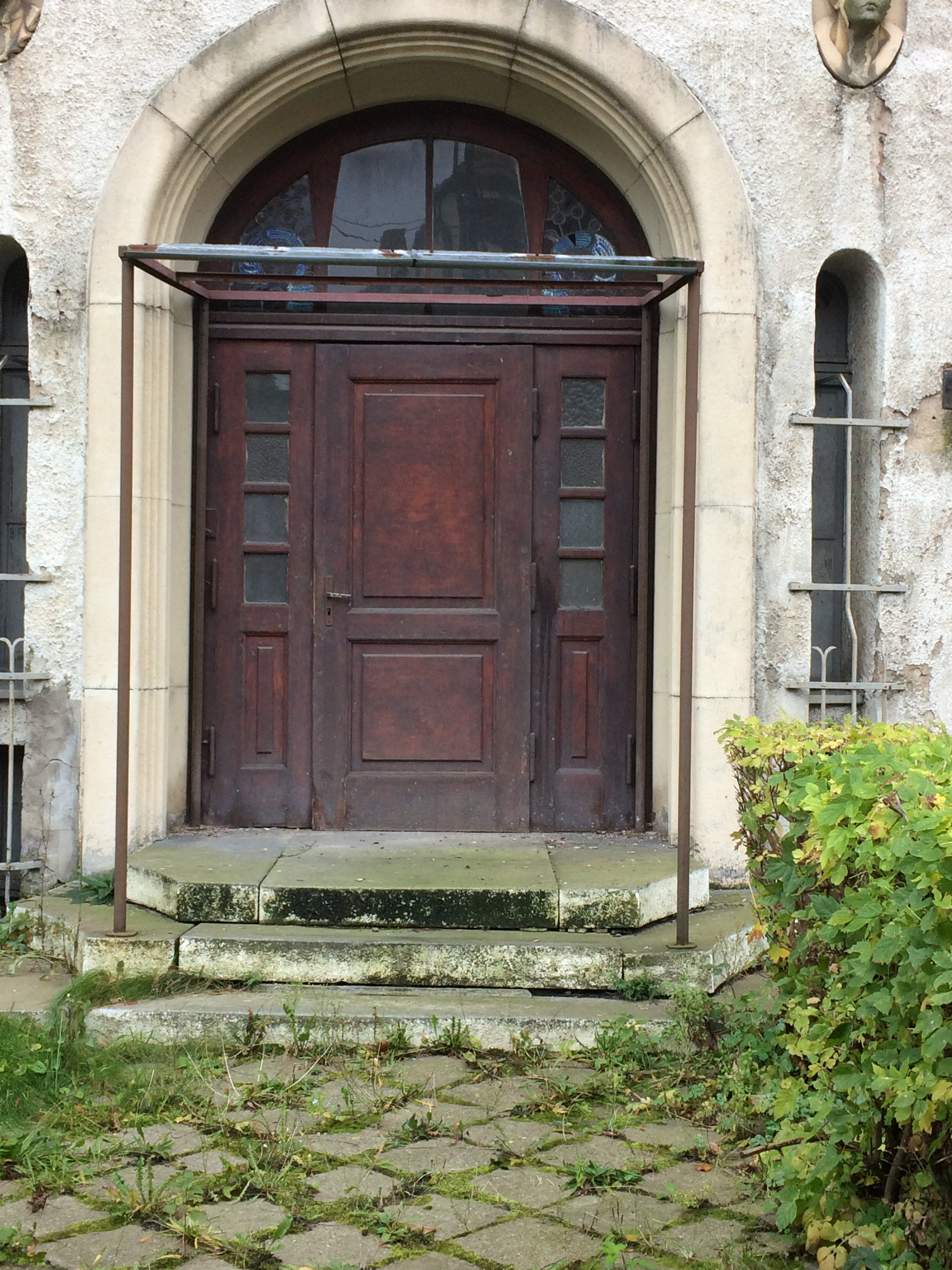
Main door

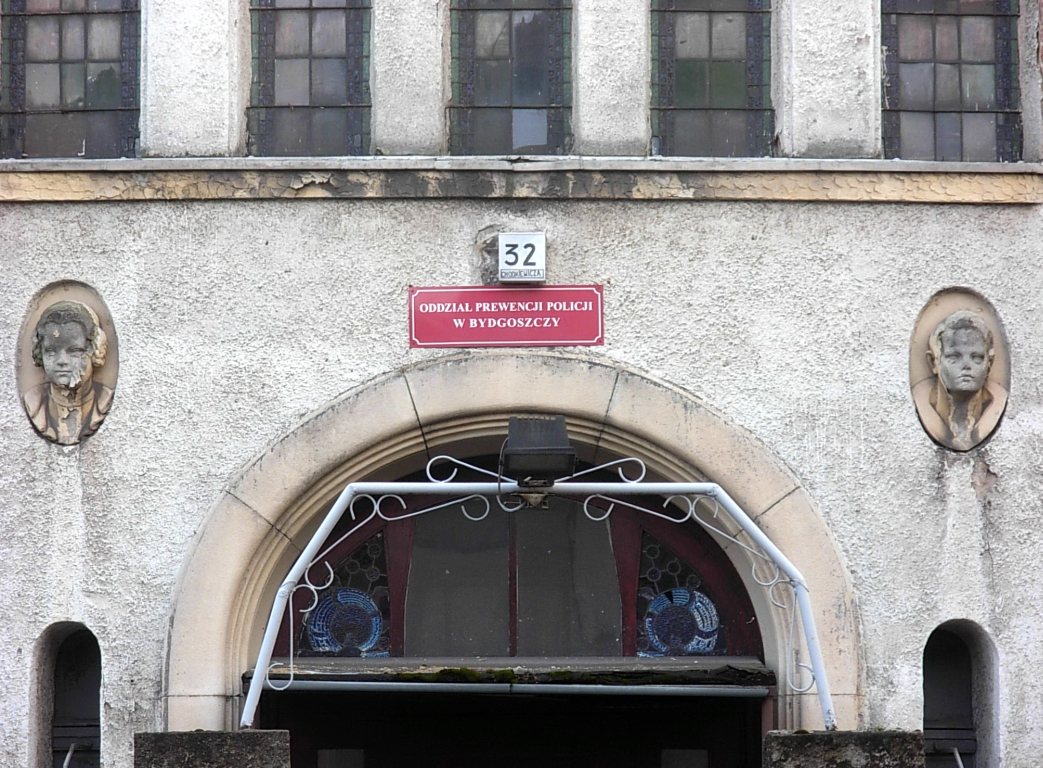
Portal decorative medallions

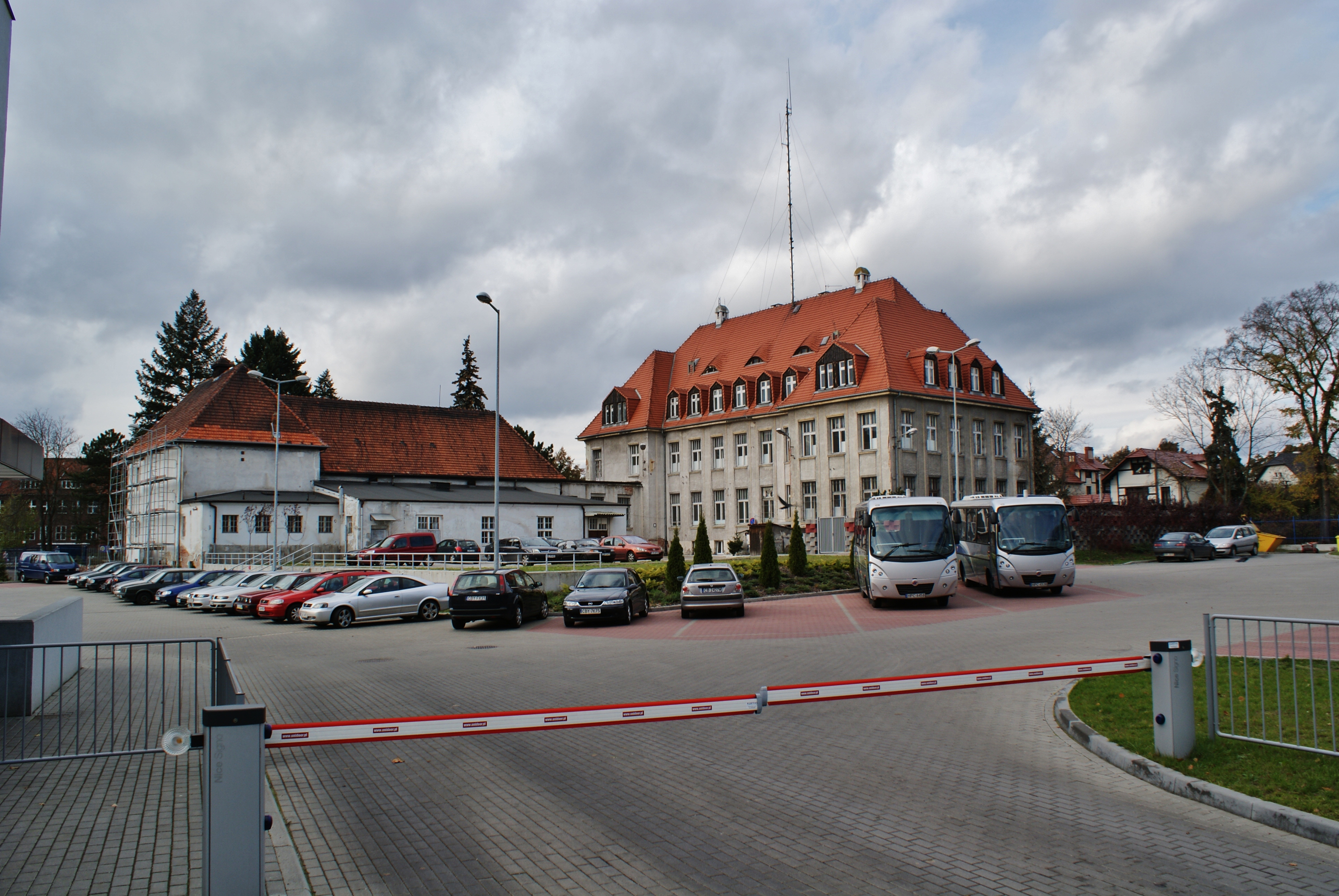
Rear view with the former sport hall on the left

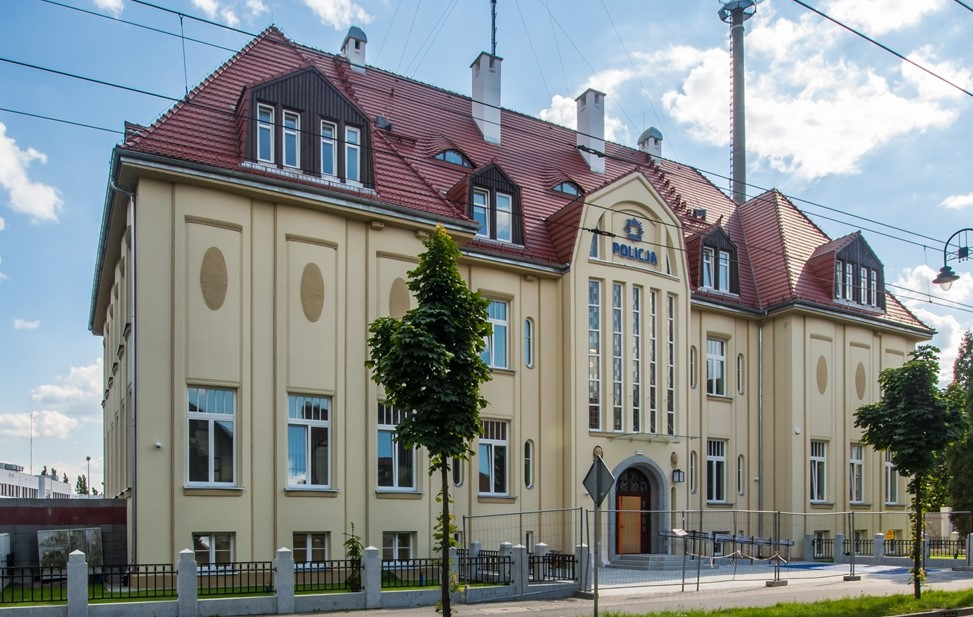
View from Jana Karola Chodkiewicza Street after renovation

== Bibliography ==
- Chojnacka, Barbara (1997). Historia i architektura dawnego sierocińca – "Internatu Kresowego" w Bydgoszczy przy ul. K. Chodkiewicza 32. Materiały do Dziejów Kultury i Sztuki Bydgoszczy i Regionu. zeszyt 2 (in Polish). Bydgoszcz: Pracownia Dokumentacji i Popularyzacji Zabytków Wojewódzkiego Ośrodka Kultury w Bydgoszczy.
- Gliwiński, Eugeniusz (1999). Pierwsze domy sierot w Bydgoszczy - Kalendarz Bydgoski (in Polish). Bydgoszcz: Towarzystwo Miłośników Miasta Bydgoszczy.
