= Gościeradz, Kuyavian-Pomeranian Voivodeship =

Gościeradz
- Village
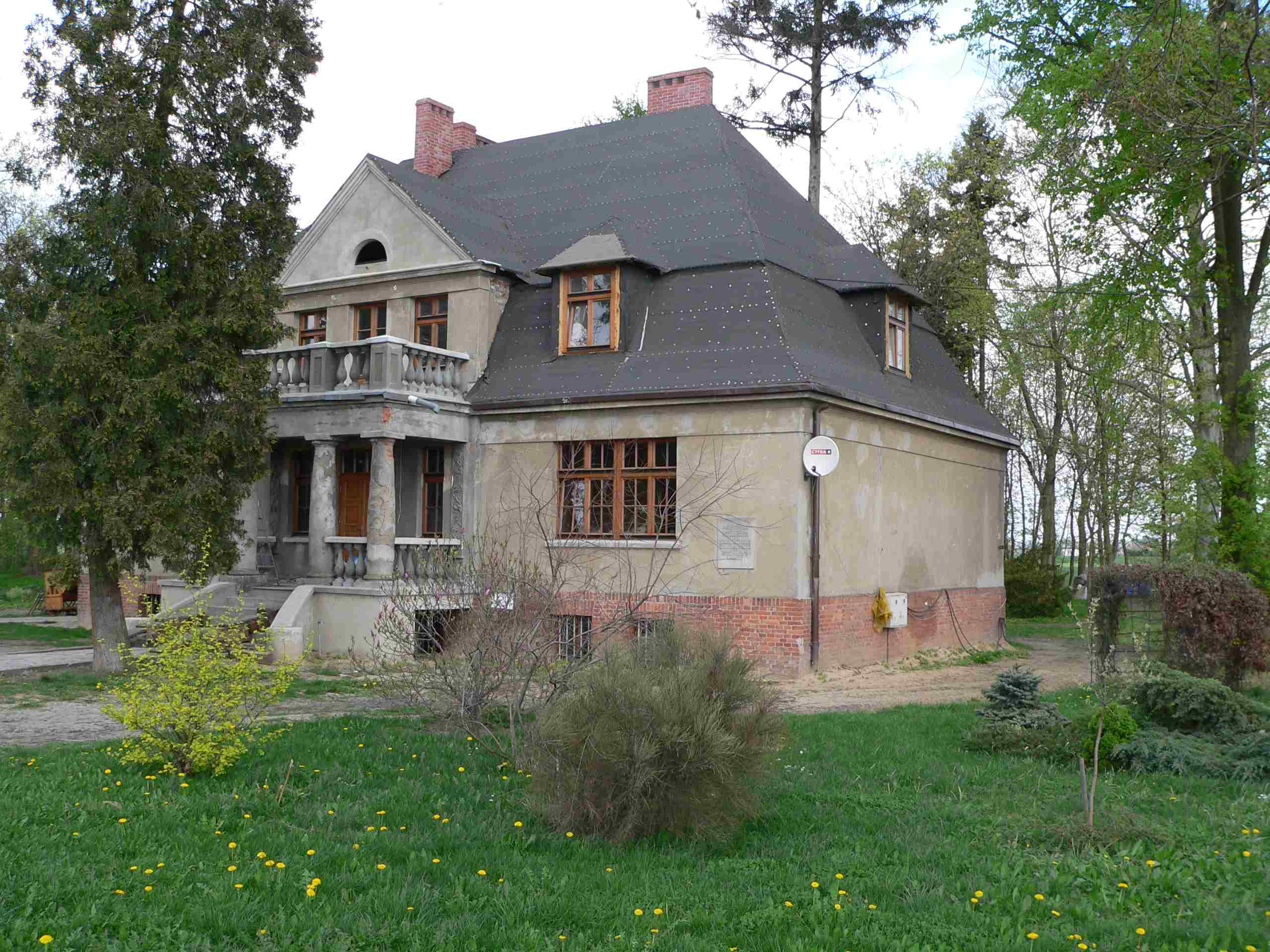
- Manor in the village

- Location within Poland
- Coordinates: 53°16′N 17°55′E
- Country: Poland
- Voivodeship: Kuyavian-Pomeranian
- County: Bydgoszcz
- Gmina: Koronowo

Population
  - Total: 386
- Website: www.goscieradz.pl

Gościeradz (Polish: [ɡɔɕˈt͡ɕɛrat͡s]) is a village in the administrative district of Gmina Koronowo, within Bydgoszcz County, Kuyavian-Pomeranian Voivodeship, in north-central Poland.
