= Steam power during the Industrial Revolution =

Improvements to the steam engine were some of the most important technologies of the Industrial Revolution, although steam did not replace water power in importance in Britain until after the Industrial Revolution. From Englishman Thomas Newcomen's atmospheric engine, of 1712, through major developments by Scottish inventor and mechanical engineer James Watt, the steam engine began to be used in many industrial settings, not just in mining, where the first engines had been used to pump water from deep workings. Early mills had run successfully with water power, but by using a steam engine a factory could be located anywhere, not just close to a water source. Water power varied with the seasons and was not always available.

In 1776 Watt formed an engine-building and engineering partnership with manufacturer Matthew Boulton. The partnership of Boulton & Watt became one of the most important businesses of the Industrial Revolution and served as a kind of creative technical centre for much of the British economy. The partners solved technical problems and spread the solutions to other companies. Similar firms did the same thing in other industries and were especially important in the machine tool industry. These interactions between companies were important because they reduced the amount of research time and expense that each business had to spend working with its own resources. The technological advances of the Industrial Revolution happened more quickly because firms often shared information, which they then could use to create new techniques or products. The development of the stationary steam engine was a very important early element of the Industrial Revolution. However, it should be remembered that for most of the period of the Industrial Revolution, the majority of industries still relied on wind and water power as well as horse and man-power for driving small machines.

== Thomas Savery's steam pump ==
The industrial use of steam power started with Thomas Savery in 1698. He constructed and patented in London the first engine, which he called the "Miner's Friend" since he intended it to pump water from mines. Early versions used a soldered copper boiler which burst easily at low steam pressures. Later versions with iron boiler were capable of raising water about 46 meters (150 feet). The Savery engine had no moving parts other than hand-operated valves. The steam once admitted into the cylinder was first condensed by an external cold water spray, thus creating a partial vacuum which drew water up through a pipe from a lower level; then valves were opened and closed and a fresh charge of steam applied directly on to the surface of the water now in the cylinder, forcing it up an outlet pipe discharging at higher level. The engine was used as a low-lift water pump in a few mines and numerous water works, but it was not a success since it was limited in pumping height and prone to boiler explosions.

== Thomas Newcomen's steam engine ==
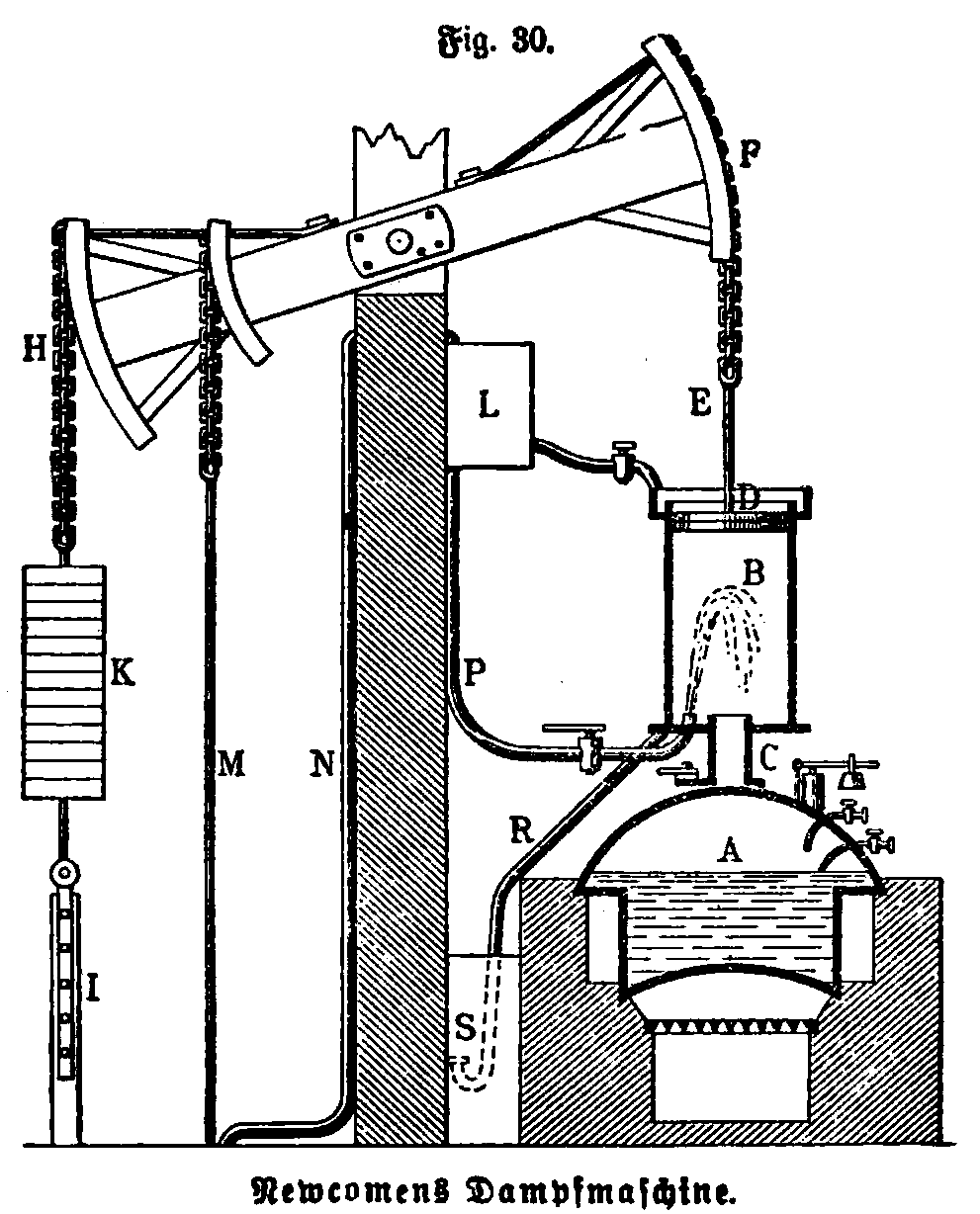
Newcomen's atmospheric steam engine

The first practical mechanical steam engine was introduced by Thomas Newcomen in 1712. Newcomen apparently conceived his machine independently of Savery, but as the latter had taken out a wide-ranging patent, Newcomen and his associates were obliged to come to an arrangement with him, marketing the engine until 1733 under a joint patent. Newcomen's engine appears to have been based on Papin's experiments carried out 30 years earlier, and employed a piston and cylinder, one end of which was open to the atmosphere above the piston. Steam just above atmospheric pressure (all that the boiler could stand) was introduced into the lower half of the cylinder beneath the piston during the gravity-induced upstroke; the steam was then condensed by a jet of cold water injected into the steam space to produce a partial vacuum; the pressure differential between the atmosphere and the vacuum on either side of the piston displaced it downwards into the cylinder, raising the opposite end of a rocking beam to which was attached a gang of gravity-actuated reciprocating force pumps housed in the mineshaft. The engine's downward power stroke raised the pump, priming it and preparing the pumping stroke. At first the phases were controlled by hand, but within ten years an escapement mechanism had been devised worked by of a vertical plug tree suspended from the rocking beam which rendered the engine self-acting.

A number of Newcomen engines were successfully put to use in Britain for draining hitherto unworkable deep mines, with the engine on the surface; these were large machines, requiring a lot of capital to build, and produced about 5 hp. They were extremely inefficient by modern standards, but when located where coal was cheap at pit heads, opened up a great expansion in coal mining by allowing mines to go deeper. Despite their disadvantages, Newcomen engines were reliable and easy to maintain and continued to be used in the coalfields until the early decades of the nineteenth century. By 1729, when Newcomen died, his engines had spread to France, Germany, Austria, Hungary and Sweden. A total of 110 are known to have been built by 1733 when the joint patent expired, of which 14 were abroad. In the 1770s, the engineer John Smeaton built some very large examples and introduced a number of improvements. A total of 1,454 engines had been built by 1800.

== James Watt's steam engines ==
A fundamental change in working principles was brought about by James Watt. With the close collaboration of Matthew Boulton, by 1778 he had succeeded in perfecting his steam engine which incorporated a series of radical improvements; notably, the use of a steam jacket around the cylinder to keep it at the temperature of the steam and, most importantly, a steam condenser chamber separate from the piston chamber. These improvements increased engine efficiency by a factor of about five, saving 75% on coal costs.

The Newcomen engine could not, at the time, be easily adapted to drive a rotating wheel, although Wasborough and Pickard did succeed in doing so in about 1780. However, by 1783 the more economical Watt steam engine had been fully developed into a double-acting rotative type with a centrifugal governor, parallel motion and flywheel, which meant that it could be used to directly drive the rotary machinery of a factory or mill. Both of Watt's basic engine types were commercially very successful.

By 1800, the firm Boulton & Watt had constructed 496 engines, with 164 driving reciprocating pumps, 24 serving blast furnaces, and 308 powering mill machinery; most of the engines generated from 5 to 10 hp. An estimate of the total power that could be produced by all these engines was about 11,200 hp. This was still only a fraction of the total power-generating capacity in Britain by waterwheels (120,000 hp) and by windmills (15,000 hp); however, water and wind power were seasonably variable. Newcomen and other steam engines generated at the same time about 24,000 hp.

== Development after Watt ==
The development of machine tools, such as the lathe, planing and shaping machines powered by these engines, enabled all the metal parts of the engines to be easily and accurately cut and in turn made it possible to build larger and more powerful engines.

In the early 19th century, after the expiration of the Boulton & Watt patent in 1800, the steam engine underwent great increases in power due to the use of higher-pressure steam, which Watt had always avoided because of the danger of exploding boilers, which were in a very primitive state of development.

Until about 1800, the most common pattern of steam engine was the beam engine, built as an integral part of a stone or brick engine-house, but soon various patterns of self-contained portative engines (readily removable, but not on wheels) were developed, such as the table engine. Further decrease in size due to use of higher pressure came towards the end of the 18th century when Cornish engineer Richard Trevithick, and American engineer Oliver Evans, independently began to construct higher-pressure (about 40 pounds per square inch (2.7 atm)) engines that exhausted into the atmosphere, although Arthur Wolf working at the Meux Brewery in London was already experimenting with higher-pressure steam in his efforts to save coal. This allowed an engine and boiler to be combined into a single unit compact and light enough to be used on mobile road and rail locomotives and steam boats.

Trevithick was a man of versatile talents, and his activities were not confined to small applications. Trevithick developed his large Cornish boiler with an internal flue from about 1812. These were also employed when upgrading a number of Watt pumping engines; by this time Arthur Wolf had already produced high-pressure engines whilst working at Meux Brewery, in his efforts to improve efficiency, thus saving coal, as he had been trained by Joseph Bramah in the art of quality control, which resulted in him becoming chief engineer at Harveys of Hayle in Cornwall, by far the largest and leading manufacturer of steam engines in the world.

The Cornish engine was developed in the 1810s for pumping mines in Cornwall. It was the result of using the exhaust of a high-pressure engine to power a condensing engine. The Cornish engine was notable for its relatively high efficiency.

=== The Corliss Engine ===
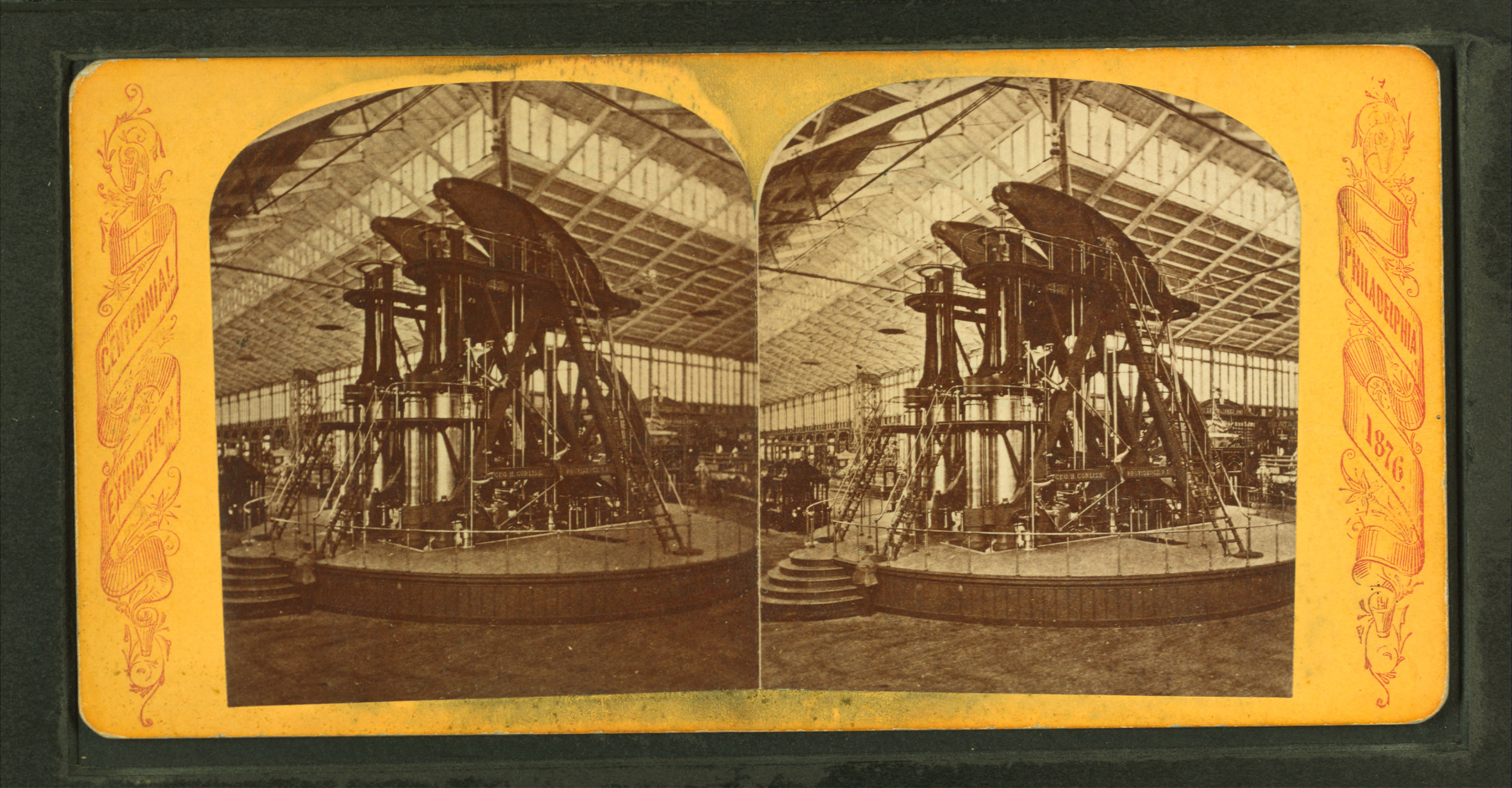
The Corliss Engine displayed at the International Exhibition of Arts, Manufactures and Products of the Soil and Mine of 1876

The last major improvement to the steam engine was the Corliss engine. Named after its inventor, George Henry Corliss, this stationary steam engine was introduced to the world in 1849. The engine boasted a number of desired features, including fuel efficiency (lowering cost of fuel by a third or more), low maintenance costs, 30% higher rate of power production, high thermal efficiency, and the ability to operate under light, heavy, or varying loads while maintaining high velocity and constant speed. While the engine was loosely based on existing steam engines, keeping the simple piston-flywheel design, the majority of these features were brought about by the engine's unique valves and valve gears. Unlike most engines employed during the era that used mainly slide-valve gears, Corliss created his own system that used a wrist plate to control a number of different valves. Each cylinder was equipped with four valves, with exhaust and inlet valves at both ends of the cylinder. Through a precisely tuned series of events opening and closing these valves, steam is admitted and released at a precise rate, allowing for linear piston motion. This provided the engine's most notable feature, the automatic variable cut-off mechanism. This mechanism is what allowed the engine to maintain a set speed in response to varying loads without losing efficiency, stalling, or being damaged. Using a series of cam gears, which could adjust valve timing (essentially acting as a throttle), the engine's speed and horsepower was adjusted. This proved extremely useful for most of the engine's applications. In the textile industry, it allowed for production at much higher speeds while lowering the likelihood that threads would break. In metallurgy, the extreme and abrupt variations of load experienced in rolling mills were also countered by the technology. These examples demonstrate that the Corliss engine was able to lead to much higher rates of production, while preventing costly damages to machinery and materials. It was referred to as “the most perfect regulation of speed.”

Corliss kept a detailed record of the production, collective horsepower, and sales of his engines up until the patent expired. He did this for a number of reasons, including tracking those who infringed on the patent rights, maintenance and upgrade details, and especially as data used to extend the patent. With this data, a more clear understanding of the engine's influence is provided. By 1869, nearly 1200 engines had been sold, totaling 118,500 horsepower. Another estimated 60,000 horsepower was being utilized by engines that were created by manufacturers infringing on Corliss's patent, bringing the total horsepower to roughly 180,000. This relatively small number of engines produced 15% of the United States’ total 1.2 million horsepower. The mean horsepower for all Corliss engines in 1870 was 100, while the mean for all steam engines (including Corliss engines) was 30. Some very large engines even allowed for applications as large as 1,400 horsepower. Many were convinced of the Corliss engine's benefits, but adoption was slow due to patent protection. When Corliss was denied a patent extension in 1870, it became a prevalent model for stationary engines in the industrial sector. By the end of the 19th century, the engine was already having a major influence on the manufacturing sector, where it made up only 10% of the sector's engines, but produced 46% of the horsepower. The engine also became a model of efficiency outside of the textile industry, as it was used for pumping the waterways of Pawtucket, Rhode Island in 1878, and played an essential role in the expansion of the railroad by allowing for very large-scale operations in rolling mills. Many steam engines of the 19th century have been replaced, destroyed, or repurposed, but the longevity of the Corliss engine is apparent today in select distilleries, where they are still used as a power source.

== Major Applications ==
=== Blast furnace power ===
In the mid-1750s, the steam engine was applied to the water power-constrained iron, copper and lead industries for powering blast bellows. These industries were located near the mines, some of which were using steam engines for mine pumping. Steam engines were too powerful for leather bellows, so cast iron blowing cylinders were developed in 1768. Steam-powered blast furnaces achieved higher temperatures, allowing the use of more lime in iron blast furnace feed. (Lime-rich slag was not free-flowing at the previously used temperatures.) With a sufficient lime ratio, sulfur from coal or coke fuel reacts with the slag so that the sulfur does not contaminate the iron. Coal and coke were cheaper and more abundant fuel. As a result, iron production rose significantly during the last decades of the 18th century.

=== Moving from water to steam power ===
Water power, the world's preceding supply of power, continued to be an essential power source even during the height of steam engine popularity. The steam engine, however, provided many benefits that couldn't be realized by relying solely on water power, allowing it to quickly become industrialised nations' dominant power source (rising from 5% to 80% of the total power in the US from 1838-1860). While many consider the potential for an increase in power generated to be the dominant benefit (with the average horsepower of steam-powered mills producing four times the power of water-powered mills), others favor the potential for agglomeration. Steam engines made it possible to easily work, produce, market, specialize, viably expand westward without having to worry about the less abundant presence of waterways, and live in communities that weren't geographically isolated in proximity to rivers and streams. Cities and towns were now built around factories where steam engines served as the foundation for the livelihood of many of the citizens. By promoting the agglomeration of individuals, local markets were established and often met with impressive success, cities quickly grew and were eventually urbanized, the quality of living increased as infrastructure was put in place, finer goods could be produced as acquisition of materials became less difficult and expensive, direct local competition led to higher degrees of specialization, and labor and capital were in rich supply. In some counties where the establishments utilized steam power, population growths were even seen to increase. These steam-powered towns encouraged growth locally and on the national scale, further validating the economic importance of the steam engine.

=== The steamboat ===
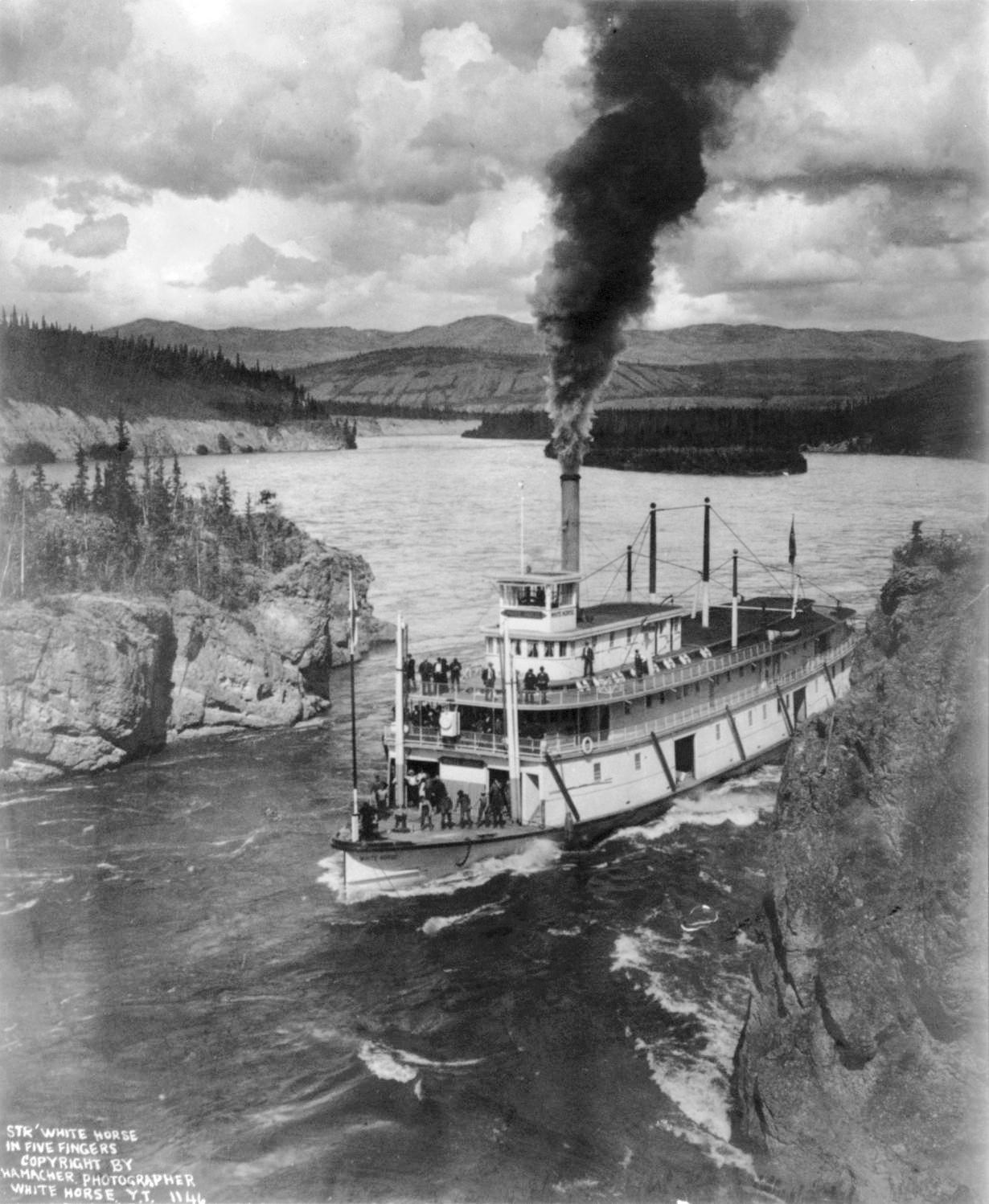
Steamboat on the Yukon River in 1920

This period of economic growth, which was ushered in by the introduction and adoption of the steamboat, was one of the greatest ever experienced in the United States. Robert Fulton, Robert Livingston and Henry Shreve were all big contributors to the introduction of the steamboat to the American public. Around 1815, steamboats began to replace barges and flatboats in the transport of goods around the United States. Prior to the steamboat, rivers were generally only used in transporting goods from east to west, and from north to south as fighting the current was very difficult and often impossible. Non-powered boats and rafts were assembled up-stream, would carry their cargo down stream, and would often be disassembled at the end of their journey; with their remains being used to construct homes and commercial buildings. Following the advent of the steamboat, the United States saw an incredible growth in the transportation of goods and people, which was key in westward expansion. Prior to the steamboat, it could take between three and four months to make the passage from New Orleans to Louisville, averaging twenty miles a day. With the steamboat this time was reduced drastically with trips ranging from twenty-five to thirty-five days. This was especially beneficial to farmers as their crops could now be transported elsewhere to be sold.

The steamboat also allowed for increased specialization. Sugar and cotton were shipped up north while goods like poultry, grain, and pork were shipped south. Unfortunately, the steamboat also aided in the internal slave trade.

With the steamboat came the need for an improved river system. The natural river system had features that either wasn't compatible with steamboat travel or was only available during certain months when rivers were higher. Some obstacles included rapids, sand bars, shallow waters and waterfalls. To overcome these natural obstacles, a network of canals, locks and dams were constructed. This increased demand for labor spurred tremendous job growth along the rivers.

The economic benefits of the steamboat extended far beyond the construction of the ships themselves, and the goods they transported. These ships led directly to growth in the coal and insurance industries, along with creating demand for repair facilities along the rivers. Additionally the demand for goods in general increased as the steamboat made transport to new destinations both wide reaching and efficient.

==== The steamboat and water transport ====
After the steamboat was invented and achieved a number of successful trials, it was quickly adopted and led to an even quicker change in the way of water transport.

In 1814, the city of New Orleans recorded 21 steamboat arrivals, but over the course of the following 20 years that number exploded to more than 1200. The steamboat's role as a major transportation source was secured. The transport sector saw enormous growth following the steam engine's application, leading to major innovations in canals, steamboats, and railroads. The steamboat and canal system revolutionized trade of the United States. As the steamboats gained popularity, enthusiasm grew for the building of canals.

In 1816, the US had only 100 miles of canals. This needed to change, however, as the potential increase in traded goods from east to west convinced many that canals were a necessary connection between the Mississippi–Ohio waterways with the Great Lakes.

=== Railroad ===
The use of steam engines on railroads proved to be extraordinary in the fact that now you could have large amounts of goods and raw materials delivered to cities and factories alike. Trains could deliver these to places far away at a fraction of the cost of traveling by wagon. Railroad tracks, which were already in use in mines and various other situations, became the new means of transportation after the first locomotive was invented.
