= Cornish engine valve gear =

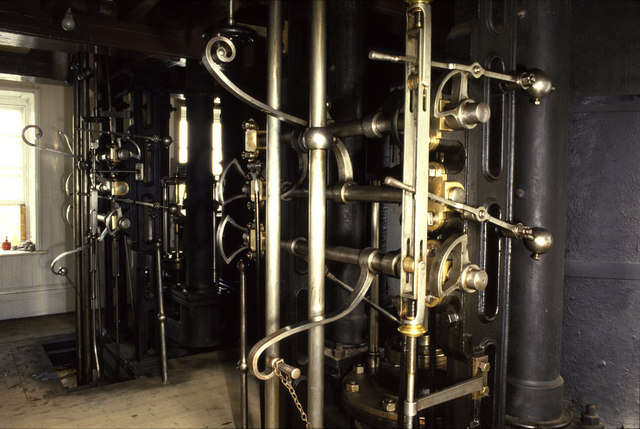
Valve gear of two Cornish Engines used for pumping water at Crofton. The older was built as a low pressure Boulton & Watt engine in 1812 and converted to the Cornish cycle in 1843, the other dates from 1846.

Valve gear opens and closes valves in the correct order. In rotating engines valve timings can be driven by eccentrics or cranks, but in non-rotative beam engines these options are not available. In the Cornish engine valves are driven either manually or through ‘plug rods’ and tappets driven from the beam. This permits the insertions of delays at various points in the cycle, allowing a Cornish Engine to vary from one stroke in ten minutes, to ten or more strokes in one minute, but also leads to some less familiar components when compared with rotative engines.

== Valve and valve gear position and linkage ==
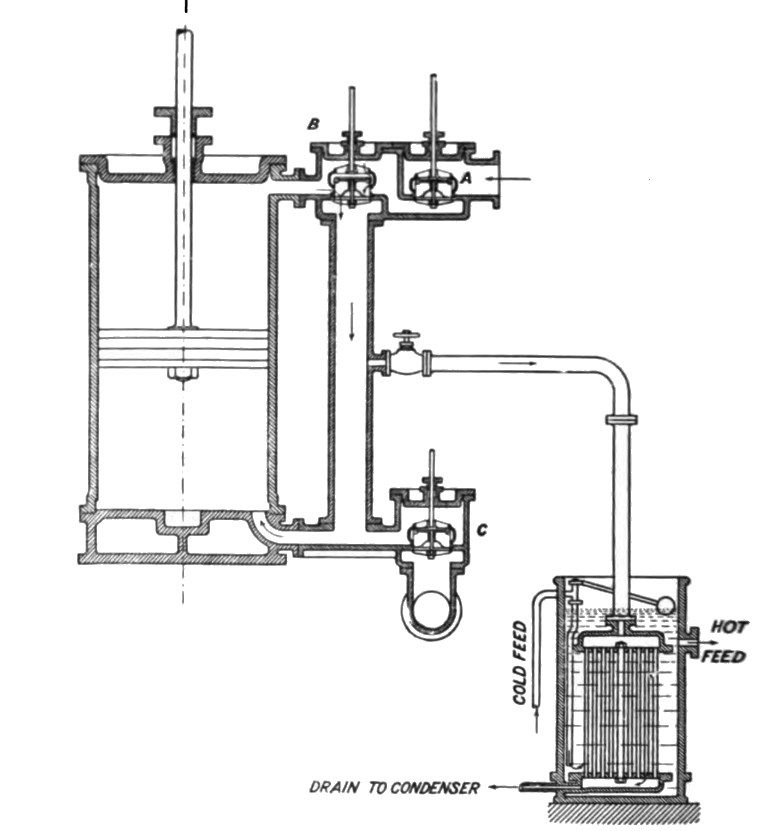
A single acting Cornish pumping engine showing the relative valve positions. Steam is initially admitted through valve A, and exhausted through valve C, as the piston descends. On the upward stroke A and C are closed and valve B, the equilibrium valve, allows steam to flow from the top of the cylinder to the bottom.

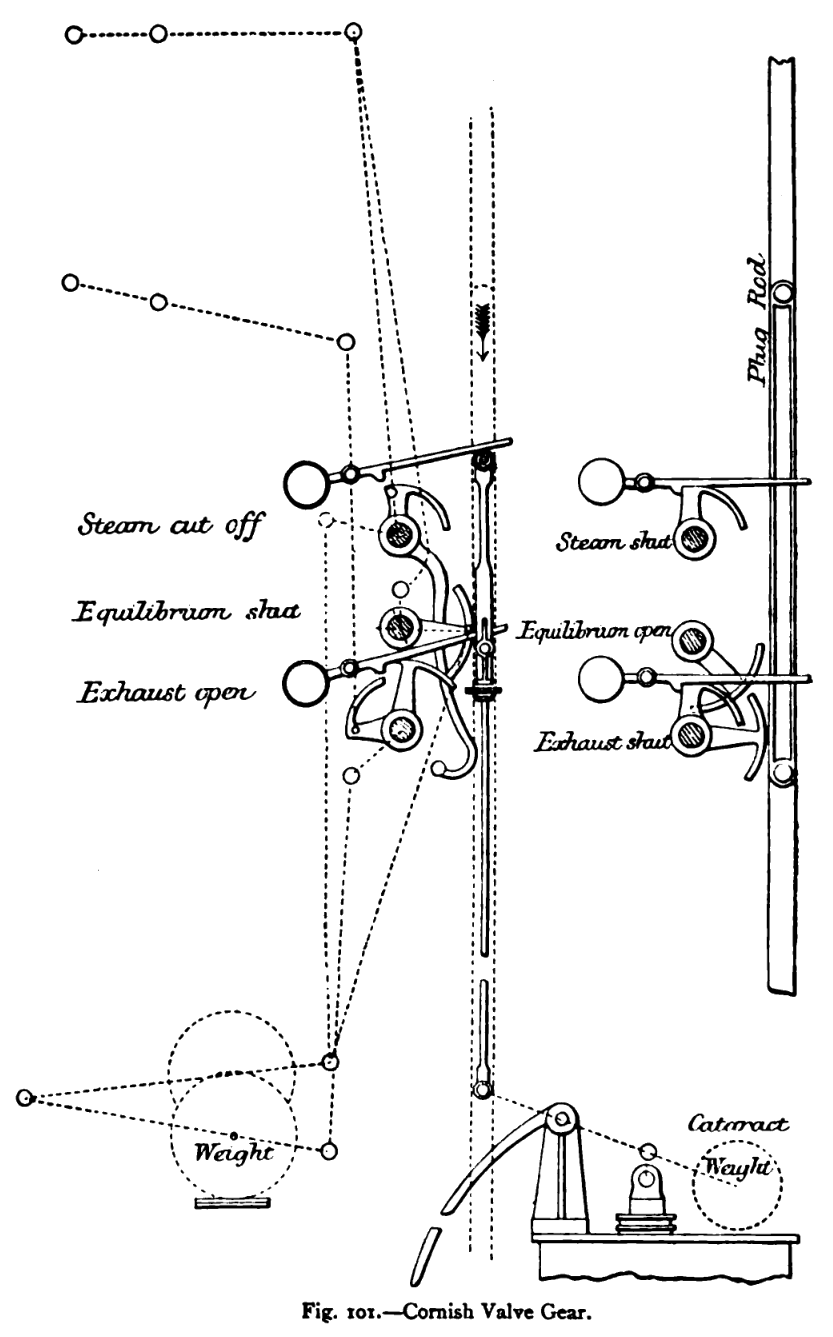
Cornish Engine valve controls with their linkages to the valves above and the weights that bias them open below. Left: The situation part way through the indoor stroke with the plug rod descending and the steam valve now closed. Later the exhaust valve will also be closed. Right: The outdoor stroke, with the steam and exhaust valves now latched closed. Note how the locking quadrants prevent the exhaust and equilibrium valves opening simultaneously.

Cornish Engines are large, even the exhaust valve on the Cruquius engine is 26 inches in diameter. To limit pipework and linkages it makes sense to place the 'driving position' adjacent to the cylinder. The valves are controlled from three horizontal rods - or arbors - mounted in a frame. These have handles to rock them backwards and forwards operating the valves. The three arbors control: Top arbor: Steam valve, Middle arbor: Equilibrium valve, and Bottom arbor: Exhaust (also called ‘eduction’) and injection (for the condenser) valves. The valves are weighted to maintain them in the open position, either by weights hung directly from lugs on the arbors or linked through rods to weights, with treadles to allow adjustment, on the floor below. In front of the arbors, in a position where they can move the handles up or down as required are one or two plug rods. These move with the beam, being connected with the parallel motion to limit them to a vertical path.

== Valve Gear components ==
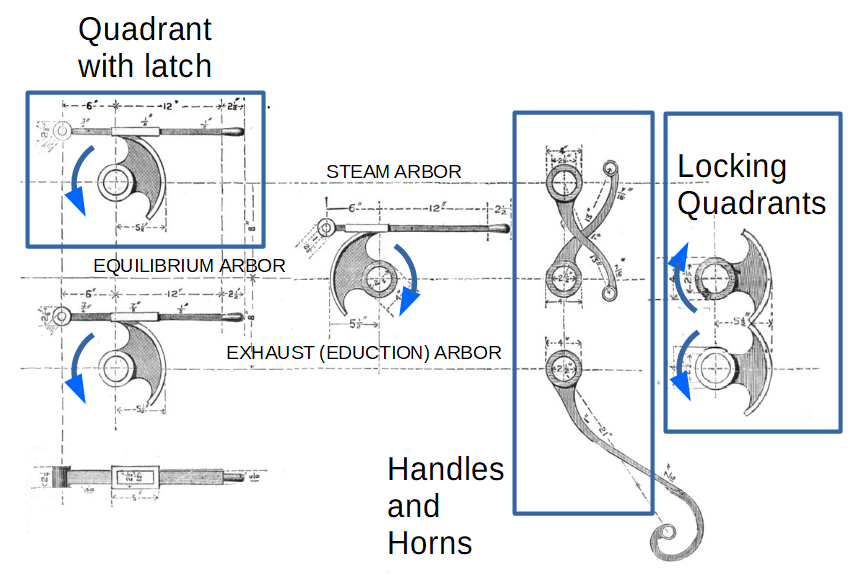
Components of a Cornish Engine valve gear shown in their correct vertical position and orientation (except for the additional plan view of the latch). All valves are shown in their closed position with blue arrows showing the direction they would turn to open.

In Cornish Engines, unlike steam locomotives, the valve sequence can be operated either automatically or manually. Cornish engines are started manually, and run until the cylinder pressure and condenser vacuum are sufficient for the machine to run automatically. Therefore the valve positions have to be automatically determined but subject to manual alteration, and this leads to some less common components and mechanisms. The image below shows many of these items, together with their layout and orientation in the engine.

=== Horns, Handles, Plug Rods and Tappets ===
The handles (or horns) attached to the arbors rotate them and, via various levers and rods, open and close the valves. The plug rods are two (or one, for some engines) vertical rods attached, via the parallel motion gear, to the beam. As well as providing convenient manual control, the handles can be moved by the plug rod(s), which have small projections – tappets – to catch on the handles. In the case of the steam arbor where the valve needs to be held down for a longer, and variable period, the tappets take the form of longer adjustable rods attached to the plug rod.

=== Quadrants, Scoggan levers, and cataracts. ===
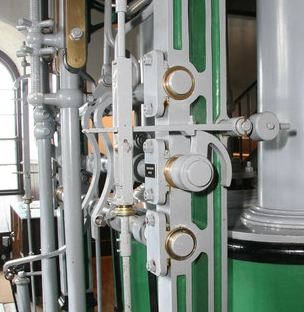
The valve gear of the Taylors pumping engine at Pool showing the ends of the three arbors. The central, equilibrium arbor, has a catch resting on it which, when raised by the cataract loop on the cataract rod, will release the quadrant. This will then be turned in an anticlockwise direction by the attached weight and open the valve.

As the arbors turn – moved by the handles – they rotate the quadrants (which despite their name as shown in the images need not be exactly 90 degrees). These can be used to keep the valves closed with the aide of a catch (referred to alternatively as a pawl, paul, latch or, in Cornwall, a scoggan lever). The quadrant is released when the lever is raised, usually by the ‘cataract’ on the floor below. This is a hydraulic timing device, set by a tappet on the plug rod striking it at the bottom of the indoor stroke. After an appropriate delay the cataract raises the associated rod and cataract loop which, by releasing the quadrant, enables the arbor, and valve to move. The cataract loop has an associated screw thread to allow for changes in the relative timing of the steam and exhaust events as it slowly lifts at the end of each cycle. In some engines a second cataract is present which manages the transition from the indoor stroke to the outdoor stroke similarly.

=== Locking Quadrants. ===
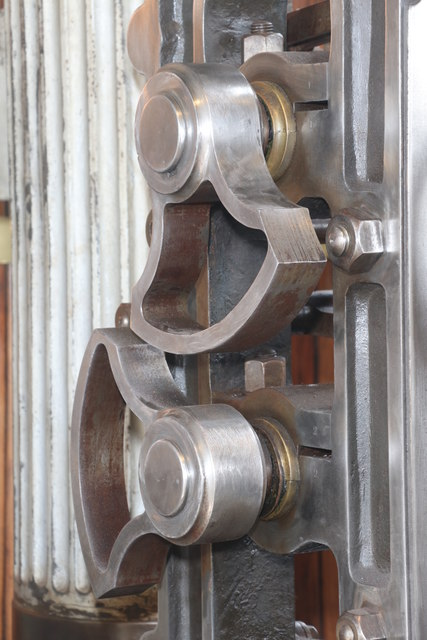
Two interlocking quadrants on an 1873 built Cornish engine at Sandfields Pumping Station. The upper one is on the exhaust arbor and the lower one on the equilibrium. There is evidence of considerable wear.

Even when operating the engine manually there are limits on how the engine can be configured. It is never appropriate to have both the exhaust and equilibrium valves open at the same time. To avoid this an additional pair of quadrants are used as “locking quadrants”. These are oriented so that in the closed position they lie almost touching, allowing either of them to move to the open position. However once one is open it blocks the other from opening. Note that Pole describes a more complex system of tappets and levers to achieve the same mutual locking effect between the exhaust and equilibrium valves.

== Assembled valve gear and its sequence ==
The above components can be assembled into a frame allowing the complete engine to be run either manually or automatically. The three arbor form is relatively fixed but, as can be seen from some of the images, there are variations in the position of the various components along them, the number of both plug rods and cataracts, and the level of ornamentation applied.

The Cornish engine has two distinct parts to its cycle – the indoors stroke, where the piston descends (usually - the Cruquius engine mentioned below being one of the exceptions) from the top of the cylinder, and the outdoor stroke where it is moving upwards. On the indoor stroke the plug rod needs to close the steam and exhaust valves, and on the rising outdoor stroke, the equilibrium valve. Thus the first two valves are constructed to be closed by moving their handles down and the equilibrium valve is closed upwards.

The following table based on Pole and Winton shows a complete cycle of a Cornish Engine, with the various actions taken by the valves. It also shows the positions of the handles to simplify comparison with videos of such engines. The valves which are open are highlighted.

Stroke	Action	Valve settings and handle positions St:Steam, Eq: Equilibrium, Ex: Exhaust,					
		Valve - O:Open, C:Closed			Handle - U:Up, D:Down		
		St	Eq	Ex	St	Eq	Ex
-	Paused with piston at the top. Steam and exhaust valves held closed by their catches. Equilibrium valves held closed by its separate cataract controlled latch or the plug rod tappet depending on the engine design	C	C	C	D	U	D
Indoor	The exhaust valve is opened, usually a little before the steam valve – either manually or by the rising cataract rod. The locking quadrants ensure that this in turn keeps the equilibrium valve closed	C	C	O	D	U	U
Indoor	The steam valve is then opened – either manually or by the rising cataract rod	O	C	O	U	U	U
Indoor	The steam valve is closed - either manually or by the descending plug rod tappet, which by adjustment can vary the cut off point and hence the expansion and efficiency. The steam tappet is extended so that it holds the steam off until the bottom of the stroke.	C	C	O	D	U	U
Indoor	The exhaust valve is closed - either manually or by the descending plug rod tappet - to slow the piston and provide a cushion at the end of the cylinder to avoid the engine hitting its end stops.	C	C	C	D	U	D
Indoor	The plug rod near the bottom of its descent resets the cateract(s) for timing. At this point the steam and exhaust valves are already being held closed by the plug rod(S) and the descending cataract rod will now latch them in the closed position.	C	C	C	D	U	D
-	Paused with the piston at the bottom	C	C	C	D	U	D
Outdoor	The exhaust cataract having moved out of the way of the locking quadrant, the equilibrium valve is now pulled open by its attached weight, alternatively a second cataract having lifted the equilibrium release catch via a separate cataract rod, the equilibrium valve is now pulled open by its attached weight.	C	O	C	D	U	D
Outdoor	The equilibrium valve is closed - either manually or by the ascending plug rod tappet - to slow the piston and provide a cushion at the end of the cylinder to avoid the engine hitting its end stops.	C	C	C	D	U	D
-	Paused with the piston at the top	C	C	C	D	U	D

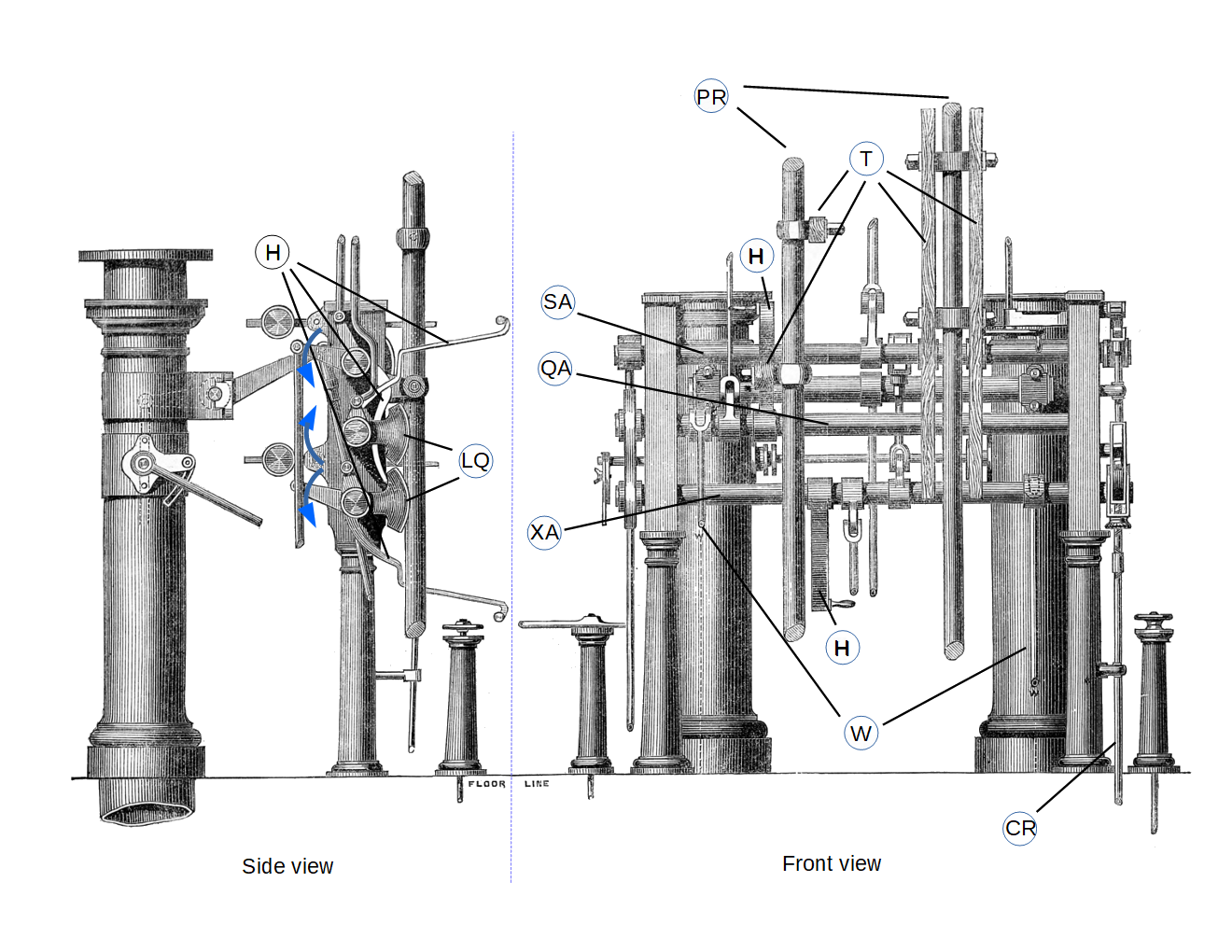
Valve gear for the 55 inch Engine at Battersea. For clarity only some parts are labelled. All the valves are shown in their closed position, the blue arrows show the direction they would turn to open. SA: Steam Arbor, QA: Equilibrium Arbor, XA: Exhaust Arbor, H: Handles, LQ: Locking Quadrants, PR: Plug Rod, T:Tappets, W: Attachment points for weights.

== Driving the engine - Stopping and Starting ==
Early beam engines were driven by direct manual operation of the valves. The absence of crankshafts, which limit piston excursions, made this difficult. As one author said “All this precision was required too from a mercenary attendant fourteen times every minute, at the hazard of the total destruction of the apparatus.” There would be some warning before the engine self destructed, since another author commented cavalierly “The concussion caused by the blow of the catch piece against the blocks serves as an intimation to the engine attendant that the pressure of the steam is becoming too high”. Later more mundane approaches, such as bells and eventually automatic limiting devices were added.

The desire to make the mechanism automatic – or self-acting – lead through various stages to the plug-rod and tappet system described above. This runs the engine satisfactorily in a steady state, but changes in steam pressure or load will still require adjustments. Human intervention is required for the starting and stopping of the engine. Starting is challenging for several reasons:

- Initially the cylinder is cold and there is no vacuum in the condenser. This has to be built up by a combination of the engines own air pump and several cycles of the piston replacing the air with steam. Then the engine will 'come alive' and behave normally.
- If too much water enters the cylinder the engine can "flood herself", filling the air pump and condenser with water.
- The down (or outdoors) stroke of the piston is powered by the falling pump weight, which then fills the pump buckets. Initially the pump will not be primed which can cause the pump weight to fall, and the outdoor stroke of the piston to occur, much more rapidly than usual. To reduce this the driver will limit the opening of the equilibrium valve to slow the movement of the piston.
- If the engine does not make sufficiently large strokes it may not operate the valve gear and cataracts satisfactorily, for example refusing to "go out"

Here is the starting procedure, as described in 1863:

The engine is always started with high pressure steam without a vacuum, the steam and eduction cataract ... being secured by a pin so that the valve catches cannot be lifted by the cataract. The regulating valve is opened by the handwheel and screw; the eduction and injection valves are opened by the handle; and the steam valve is opened by placing the foot in the stirrup on the rod. The engine thus makes the indoor stroke, and after a few strokes a vacuum is produced, and the engine regulated to the proper length of stroke by the regulating valve. The cataract ... is then released so that it may liberate the valve catches; and the engine then works the desired length of stroke so long as the steam in the boilers remains at about the same pressure.

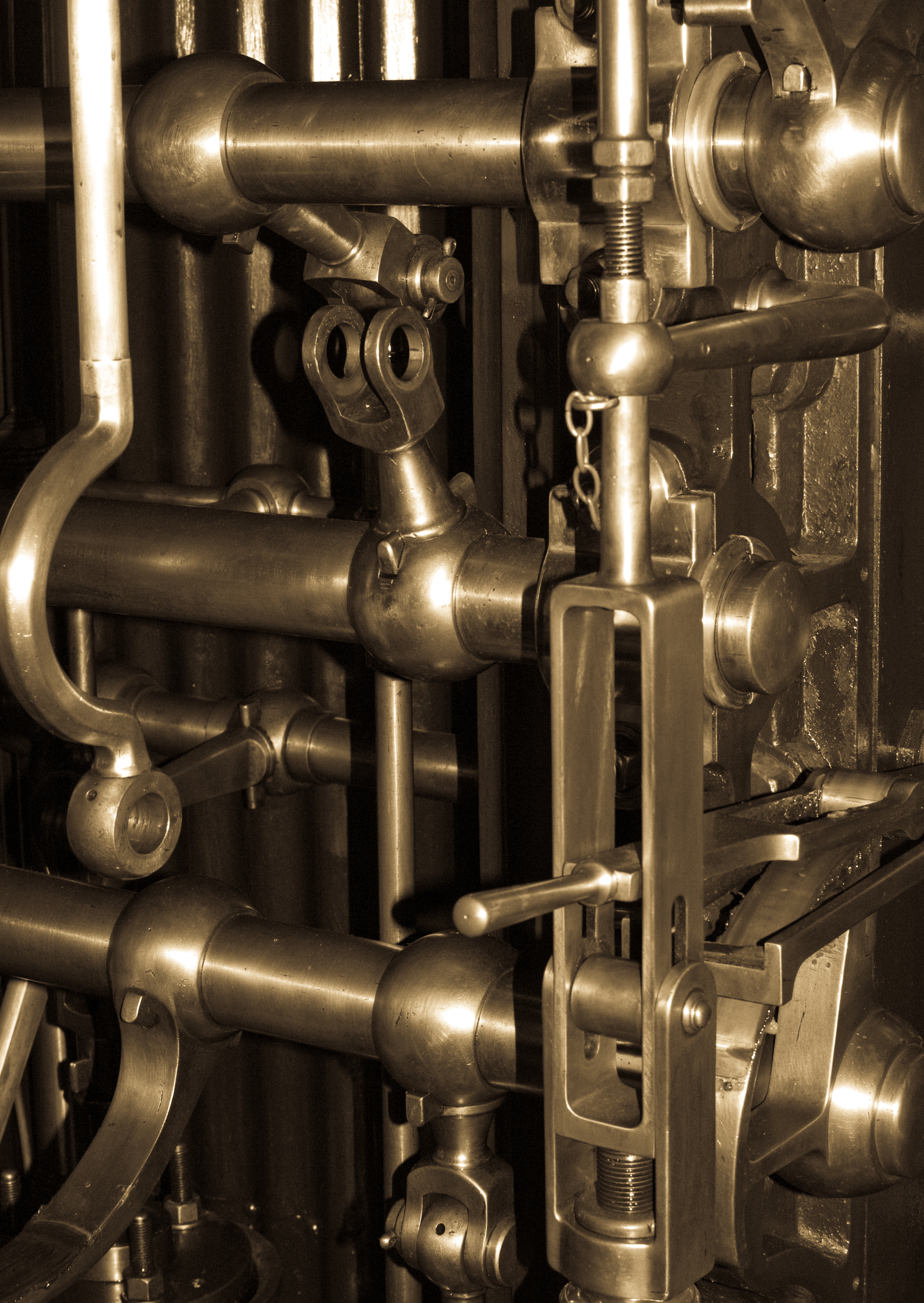
End of the arbors of the Maudslay Engine at Kew. The cataract loop responsible for lifting the catch on the exhaust valve quadrant is clearly visible with above it the pin on a chain for locking the cataract rod in position when stopping the engine.

Stopping the engine is less complex, since it is quiescent at the end of its cycle (and also in the middle for two cataract machines) until reawakened by the cataract, which raises the cataract rod lifting the latches from the quadrant arbor(s). The cataract is propelled not by steam power, but a falling weight, and can be stopped with little force. A small pin ( visible in one of the images) through the cataract rod is sufficient to stop it from rising, and thus stop the engine.

== Variations ==
The three arbor form of valve gear is relatively fixed, with individual variations in component positioning and count. Some engines (see the diagram of the 55 inch Battersea engine) using a single cataract to restart the indoor stroke, while others (such as the Taylors engine at Pool) use an additional one to allow for a delay before starting the outdoor stroke. This is used for example on the Museum De Cruquius engine to provide time to fill the pump buckets. A later variant of the Cornish Engine is the Bull engine, which dispenses with the beam by having the cylinder mounted directly over the pump leading to significant valve gear differences. As one source describes

Driving a Cornish beam engine is tricky enough but the Bull is a different kettle of fish altogether. Not only is the cycle 'upside down' (the steam stroke is up rather than down and vice versa for the equilibrium stroke) but the arbors are in a different order (the middle arbor and bottom arbor are exhaust and equilibrium rather than the other way round) and the cataract pauses the equilibrium stroke rather than the power stroke.

— https://www.geograph.org.uk/photo/3798302

There are also compound Cornish Engines, which inevitably need extra connections to drive the additional valves linking the cylinders. Andre describes one near Saarbrucken with an additional beam just to work the steam distributing valves. The Cruquius Engine in the Netherlands is complex, being an annular compound, and constructed ‘upside down’, leaving the exhaust valve at floor level with the steam and equilibrium valve on the floor below. Nonetheless it is controlled by the same three arbors in the usual order.

The central role of the valve gear arbors in operating a Cornish Engine also makes them an appropriate place to position other controls. These can include Governor valves to limit the rate of input steam flow, cut-off settings, lubrication arrangements and adjustments to modify the delay imposed by the cataract(s).

== See also ==
- Cornish engine
- Cutoff
- Valve gear
