= Trevithick Society =

Coordinates: 50°12′49.14″N 5°18′4.5″W

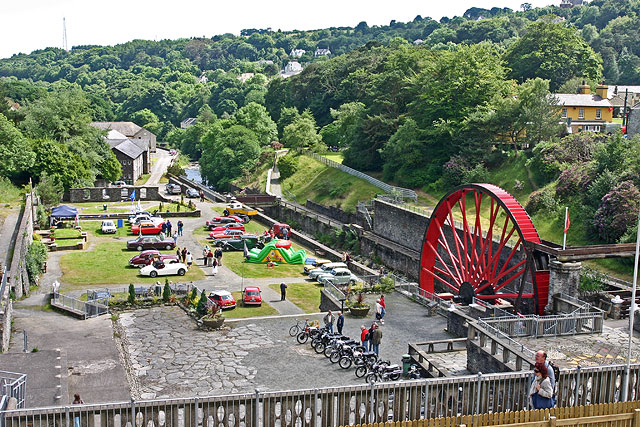
- Laxey Valley Gardens Snaefell Mine Waterwheel (50.5 feet) to pump water from the mine. Preserved by the Trevithick Society when the mine closed; it has since been returned to the site.
- Formation: 1935
- Type: Non-profit
- Purpose: Education
- Location: Camborne, Cornwall, UK
- Region served: International
- Official language: English
- Chairman: Philip Hosken
- Public Relations: Kenn Shearer
- Membership Secretary: Sheila Saunders
- Website: Trevithick Society
- Formerly called: Cornish Engines Preservation Committee

The Trevithick Society is a registered charity named for Richard Trevithick, a Cornish engineer who contributed to the use of high pressure steam engines for transportation and mining applications.

== History ==
In 1935 the Cornish Engines Preservation Committee (CEPC) was formed to rescue the Levant winding engine which was deemed outdated and scheduled to be scrapped. CEPC were forerunners in the field of Industrial Archaeology. They acquired another winding engine and two pumping engines. CEPC merged with the newly formed Cornish Waterwheel Preservation Society in 1971 and named the organisation the Trevithick Society after Richard Trevithick.

=== Chapel Coombe ===
At Chapel Coombe a set of old Cornish stamps has been re-erected by the Trevithick Society.

=== Dolcoath pumping engine ===
Dolcoath was the largest and deepest mine in Cornwall, with its principal shaft, known as New Sump Shaft, eventually reaching a depth of 3,300 feet (1,000 m) below the surface. The pumping engine that worked this shaft dated from 1815; a piece of the cast iron bob from this engine is preserved in the collection of the Trevithick Society.

== Membership ==
Although founded in Cornwall, members are located across England and the world. An annual celebration is held to celebrate Richard Trevithick's life in Cornwall at Camborne.

Membership is offered to students, individuals and corporations domestically and internationally. Members receive the quarterly newsletter. All members, except students who receive a discounted membership fee, receive the annual journal. Members may attend Cornish Engines (free), Geevor Tin Mine (free), lectures, activities and the Society's annual meeting.

== Journal of the Trevithick Society ==
The organisation produces the Journal of the Trevithick Society annually and a newsletter quarterly. The purpose of the journal is: "For the study of history of industry and technology in Cornwall."

== Publications ==
- Climax Rock Drill Company, Trevithick Society. Climax Illustrated. Trevithick Society; 2006. ISBN 978-0-904040-66-1.
- John Corin. Levant: A Champion Cornish Mine. Trevithick Society; 1992. ISBN 978-0-904040-37-1.
- Richard John Cunnack; Justin Brooke; Trevithick Society. The Cunnack Manuscript: from notes taken between 1845 and 1907. Trevithick Society; October 1993. ISBN 978-0-904040-36-4.
- Bryan Earl. Cornish Explosives: A History from 1900 to 1976. Trevithick Society; 2006. ISBN 978-0-904040-68-5.
- Thomas Roberts Harris. Sir Goldsworthy Gurney, 1793–1875. Trevithick Society : Federation of Old Cornwall Societies; 1975. ISBN 978-0-904040-05-0.
- Peter Joseph. Hard Graft: Botallack Mine in the Twentieth Century. Trevithick Society; 2010. ISBN 978-0-904040-82-1.
- Peter Joseph. Mining Accidents in the St Just District, 1831–1914. Trevithick Society; 1 January 1999. ISBN 978-0-904040-48-7.
- Frank Michell; Trevithick Society. Michell: A Family of Cornish Engineers 1740–1910. Trevithick Society; June 1984
- L. P. S. Piper. A short history of the Camborne School of Mines. Trevithick Society; 1975
- Nigel Tangye; Trevithick Society; Institute of Cornish Studies. Cornwall newspapers, 18th & 19th century: gazetteer & finding list. Trevithick Society; 1 December 1980
- Trevithick Society. Cornish Pumping Engines. Trevithick Society; 1985. ISBN 978-0-904040-25-8.
- Trevithick Society. Cornish Pumping Engines and Rotative Beam Engines: Containing a Reprint of a Book Published in 1953 by the Cornish Engines Preservation Society. Trevithick Society; 1998. ISBN 978-0-904040-46-3.
- John Hubert Trounson. Cornish Engines & the Men who Handled Them. Trevithick Society; 1 January 1985. ISBN 978-0-904040-26-5.
- J. H. Trounson; Trevithick Society. Mining in Cornwall 1850–1960. Dyllansow Truran; 1989. ISBN 978-1-85022-049-7.

== Gallery ==
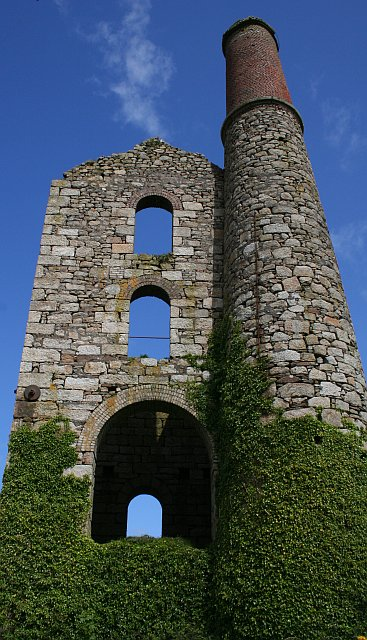
Woolf's Engine House at Condurrow. More information on this building can be found at the Trevithick Society.

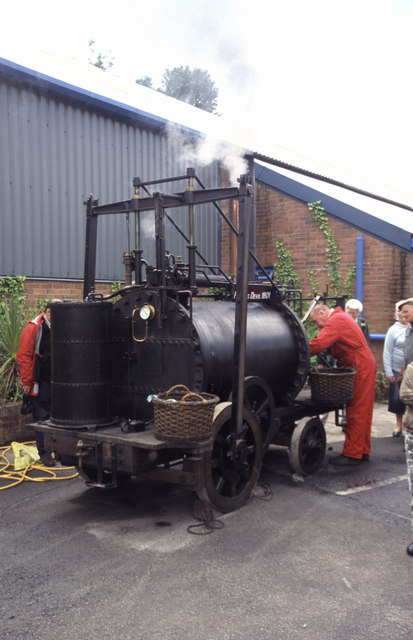
Replica of Trevithick's "Puffing Devil", built by the Trevithick Society and regularly demonstrated in Cornwall.

== See also ==
- Association for Industrial Archaeology
- IA, The Journal of the Society for Industrial Archeology
- Lean's Engine Reporter
