= Centrifugal governor =

Mechanism for automatically controlling the speed of an engine

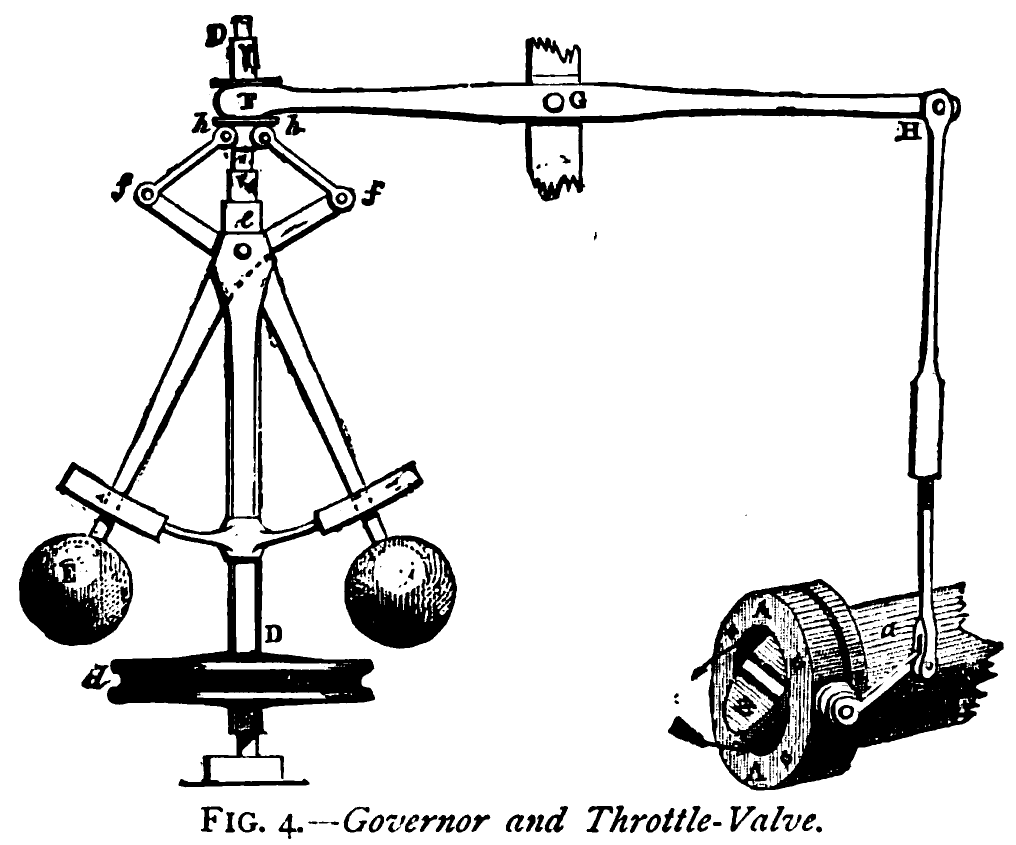
Drawing of a centrifugal "fly-ball" governor, where the balls swing out as speed increases, which closes the valve, until a balance is achieved between demand and the proportional gain of the linkage and valve.

A centrifugal governor is a specific type of governor with a feedback system that controls the speed of an engine by regulating the flow of fuel or working fluid, so as to maintain a near-constant speed. It uses the principle of proportional control.

A centrifugal governor was invented by Christiaan Huygens in the seventeenth century, where it was used "for the regulation of windmills and water wheels". The devices are also known as "centrifugal regulators" and "fly-ball governors". In 1788, James Watt adapted one to control his steam engine, where it regulated the admission of steam into the engine's cylinders. This development proved so important that Watt is sometimes called the inventor. Centrifugal governors' widest use was on steam engines during the Steam Age in the 19th century. They are also found on stationary internal combustion engines, variously fueled turbines, and in some modern striking clocks.

A simple governor does not maintain an exact speed but a speed range, since under increasing load the governor opens the throttle as the speed (RPM) decreases.

== Operation ==
=== Sourced descriptions ===
A detailed description of an example of a centrifugal governor, with a fully labeled schematic, appears in the article on "Angular Motion, or Velocity", in Oliver Byrne's edition of Spons' Dictionary of Engineering, with further elaboration in the article on "Governors" (in a later volume).

=== Detailed description of operation ===
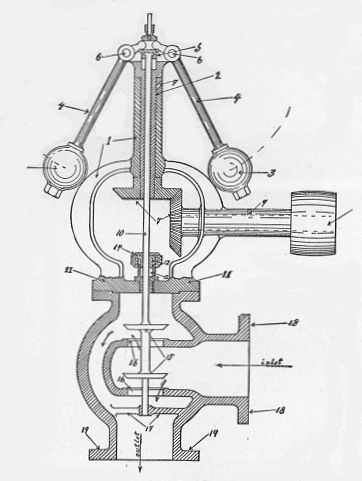
Cut-away drawing of a steam engine speed governor. The drive shaft whose speed is being sensed is at top right. The valve starts fully open at zero speed, but as the balls rotate and rise, the central valve stem is forced downward and closes the valve.

The device shown is on a steam engine; power is supplied to the governor from the engine's output shaft by a belt or chain connected to the lower belt wheel, and the governor is connected to a throttle valve that regulates the flow of working fluid (steam) supplying the prime mover. As the speed of the prime mover increases, the central spindle of the governor rotates at a faster rate, and the kinetic energy of the balls increases. This allows the two masses on lever arms to move outwards and upwards against gravity. If the motion goes far enough, this motion causes the lever arms to pull down on a thrust bearing, which moves a beam linkage, which reduces the aperture of a throttle valve. The rate of working-fluid entering the cylinder is thus reduced and the speed of the prime mover is controlled, preventing over-speeding.

Mechanical stops may be used to limit the range of throttle motion, as seen near the masses in the image at the top of this page.

==== Non-gravitational regulation ====
A limitation of the two-arm, two-ball governor is its reliance on gravity to retract the balls when the governor slows down, and therefore a requirement that the governor stay upright. Governors have been built that do not use gravitational force, using a single straight arm with weights on both ends, a center pivot attached to a spinning axle, and a spring that tries to force the weights towards the center of the spinning axle. The two weights on opposite ends of the pivot arm counterbalance any gravitational effects, but both weights use centrifugal force to work against the spring and attempt to rotate the pivot arm towards a perpendicular axis relative to the spinning axle.

Spring-retracted non-gravitational governors are commonly used in single-phase alternating current (AC) induction motors to turn off the starting field coil when the motor's rotational speed is high enough. They are also commonly used in snowmobile and all-terrain vehicle (ATV) continuously variable transmissions (CVT), both to engage/disengage vehicle motion and to vary the transmission's pulley diameter ratio in relation to the engine revolutions per minute.

== History ==
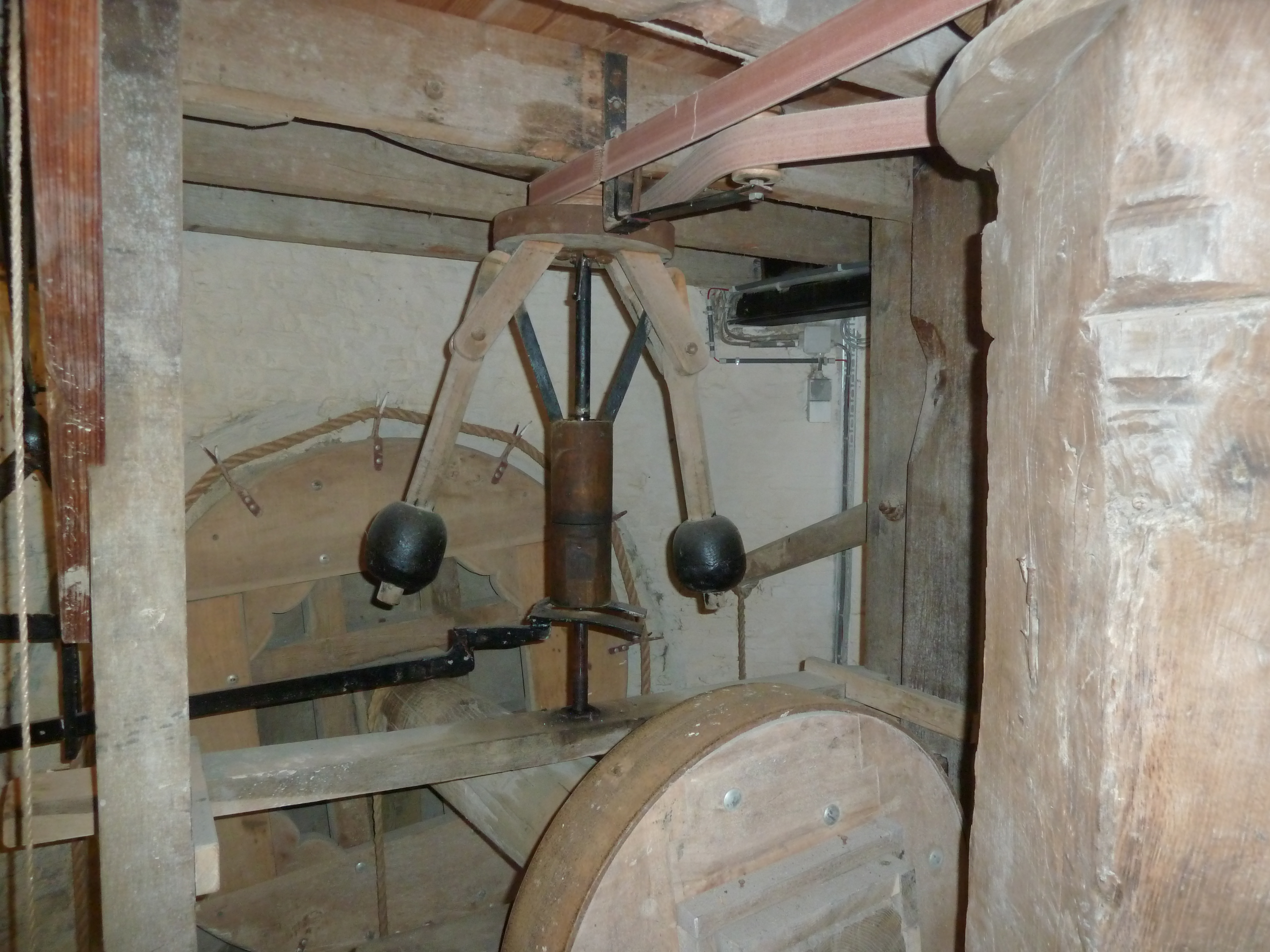
A millstone governor at Sluis, in the Netherlands

A centrifugal governor was invented by Christiaan Huygens in the seventeenth century, where it was used "for the regulation of windmills and water wheels". also known as "centrifugal regulators" and "flyball governors" in that application, the governor was used to regulate the distance and pressure between millstones.

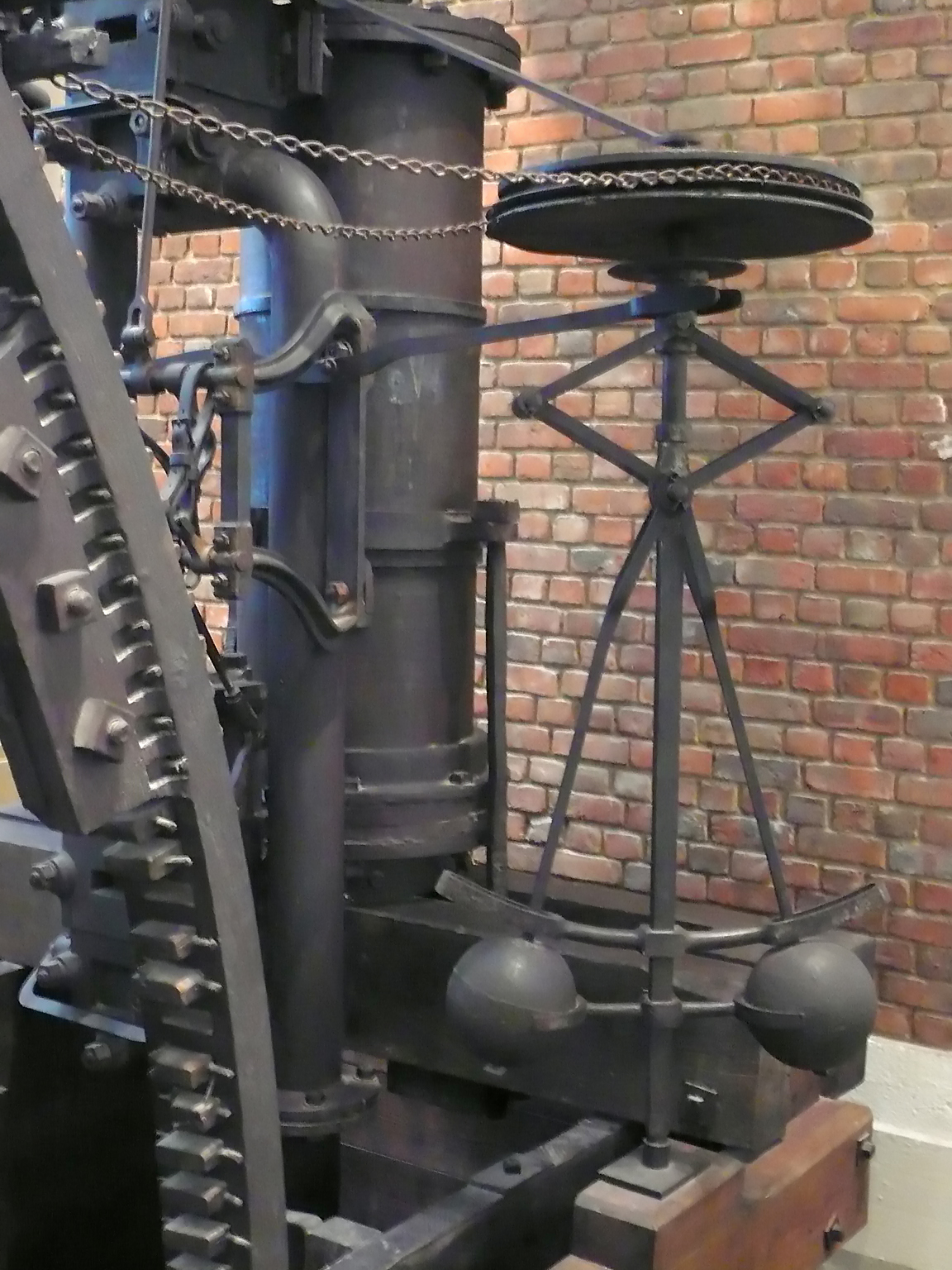
Boulton & Watt engine of 1788

James Watt applied the same technology to steam engines. He designed his first governor (or 'centrifugal speed regulator') in 1788, following a suggestion from his business partner Matthew Boulton; it was a conical pendulum governor, and one of the final series of innovations Watt had employed for steam engines.

Over subsequent decades a series of improvements and modifications were made by a number of different engineers and manufacturers. Among the inventors who contributed to development of the governor in the 19th century were Charles Porter, Wilson Hartnell, Richard Tangye, Rudolph Proell and Buss.

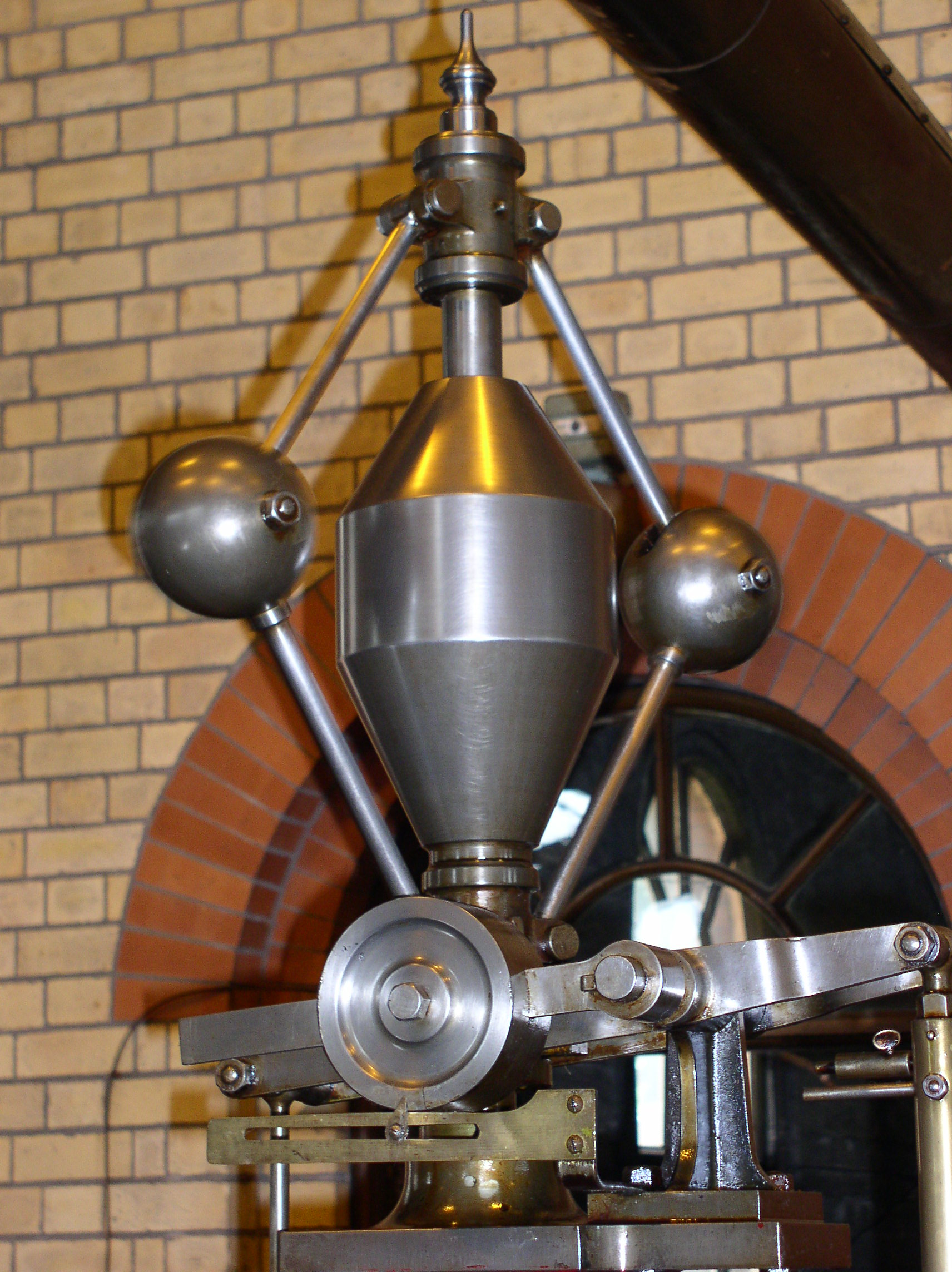
A Porter governor on a Corliss steam engine. This design, patented by Charles Porter in 1858, used lighter balls and a sliding weight on the spindle; it suited faster engines.

As engine speeds increased, the basic Watt-type governor became less reliable as it would tend to over-compensate, oscillating between opening and closing the steam valve and preventing the engine from running smoothly. This led to many modifications and variations over time, including the addition of a dead weight around the spindle, and the application of springs as part of the design. A number of different firms of engineers patented their own variation on the concept, which they would apply to their own engines, and more modern governors were sometimes retrofitted to engines already in service.

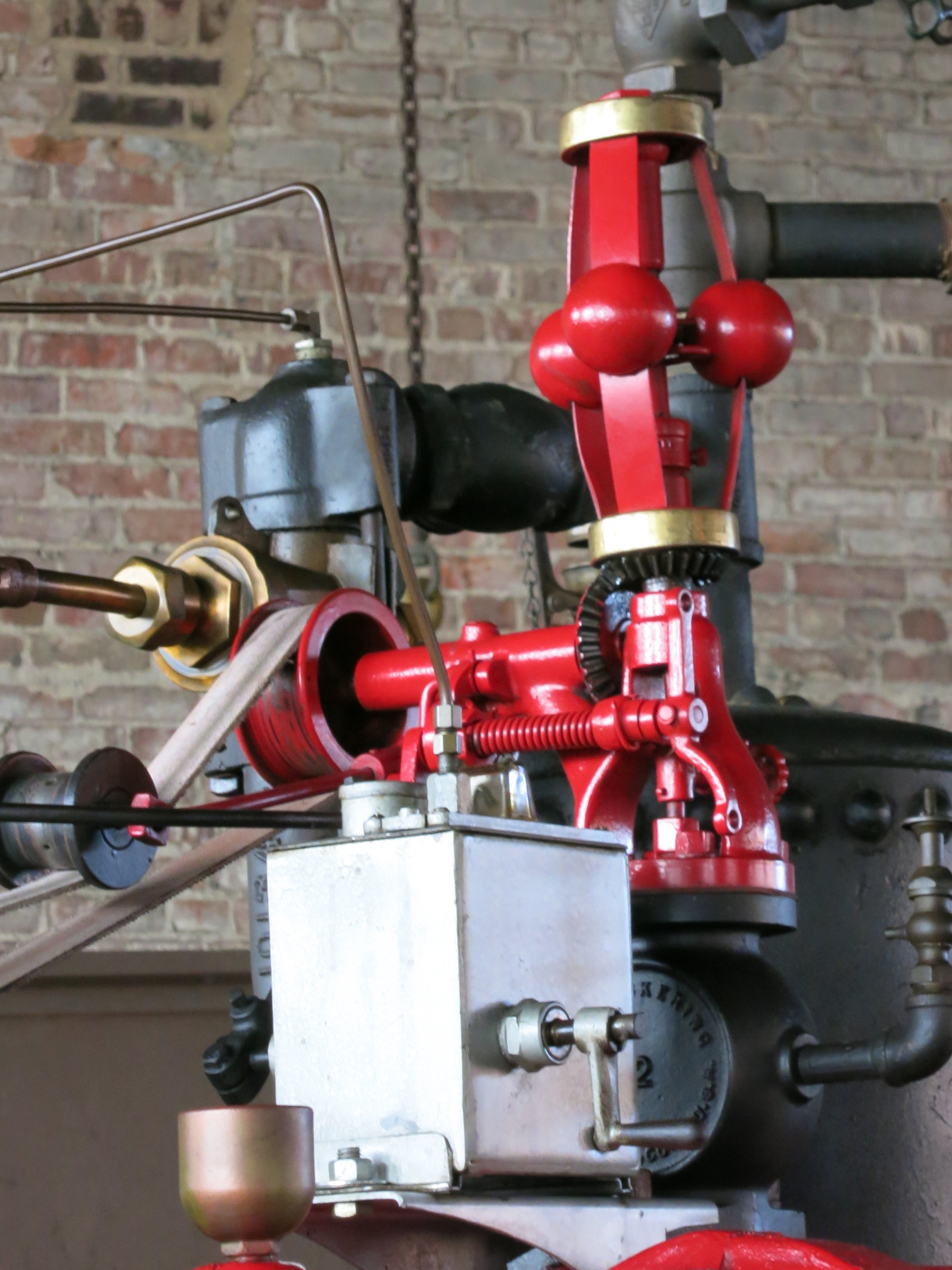
The Pickering Governor (first patented in 1862) has balls mounted on leaf springs. It was especially suited to smaller high-speed engines and was manufactured in large numbers.

== Uses ==
Centrifugal governors' widest use was on steam engines during the Steam Age in the 19th century. They are also found on stationary internal combustion engines and variously fueled turbines, and in some modern striking clocks.

Centrifugal governors are used in many modern repeating watches to limit the speed of the striking train, so the repeater does not run too quickly.

Another kind of centrifugal governor consists of a pair of masses on a spindle inside a cylinder, the masses or the cylinder being coated with pads, somewhat like a centrifugal clutch or a drum brake. This is used in a spring-loaded record player and a spring-loaded telephone dial to limit the speed.

== Dynamic systems ==
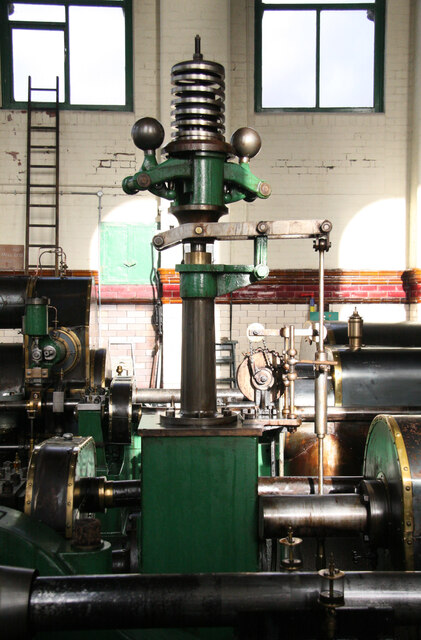
The spring-loaded Whitehead governor, patented in 1895, was widely used on mill engines (as here at Ellenroad).

The centrifugal governor is often used in the cognitive sciences as an example of a dynamic system, in which the representation of information cannot be clearly separated from the operations being applied to the representation. And, because the governor is a servomechanism, its analysis in a dynamic system is not trivial. In 1868, James Clerk Maxwell wrote a famous paper "On Governors" that is widely considered a classic in feedback control theory. Maxwell distinguishes moderators (a centrifugal brake) and governors which control motive power input. He considers devices by James Watt, Professor James Thomson, Fleeming Jenkin, William Thomson, Léon Foucault and Carl Wilhelm Siemens (a liquid governor).

=== Natural selection ===
In his 1858 paper to the Linnean Society, which led Darwin to publish On the Origin of Species, Alfred Russel Wallace used governors as a metaphor for the evolutionary principle:

The action of this principle is exactly like that of the centrifugal governor of the steam engine, which checks and corrects any irregularities almost before they become evident; and in like manner no unbalanced deficiency in the animal kingdom can ever reach any conspicuous magnitude, because it would make itself felt at the very first step, by rendering existence difficult and extinction almost sure soon to follow.

The cybernetician and anthropologist Gregory Bateson thought highly of Wallace's analogy, and discussed the topic in his Mind and Nature: A Necessary Unity (1979), and other scholars have continued to explore the connection between natural selection and systems theory.

== Culture ==
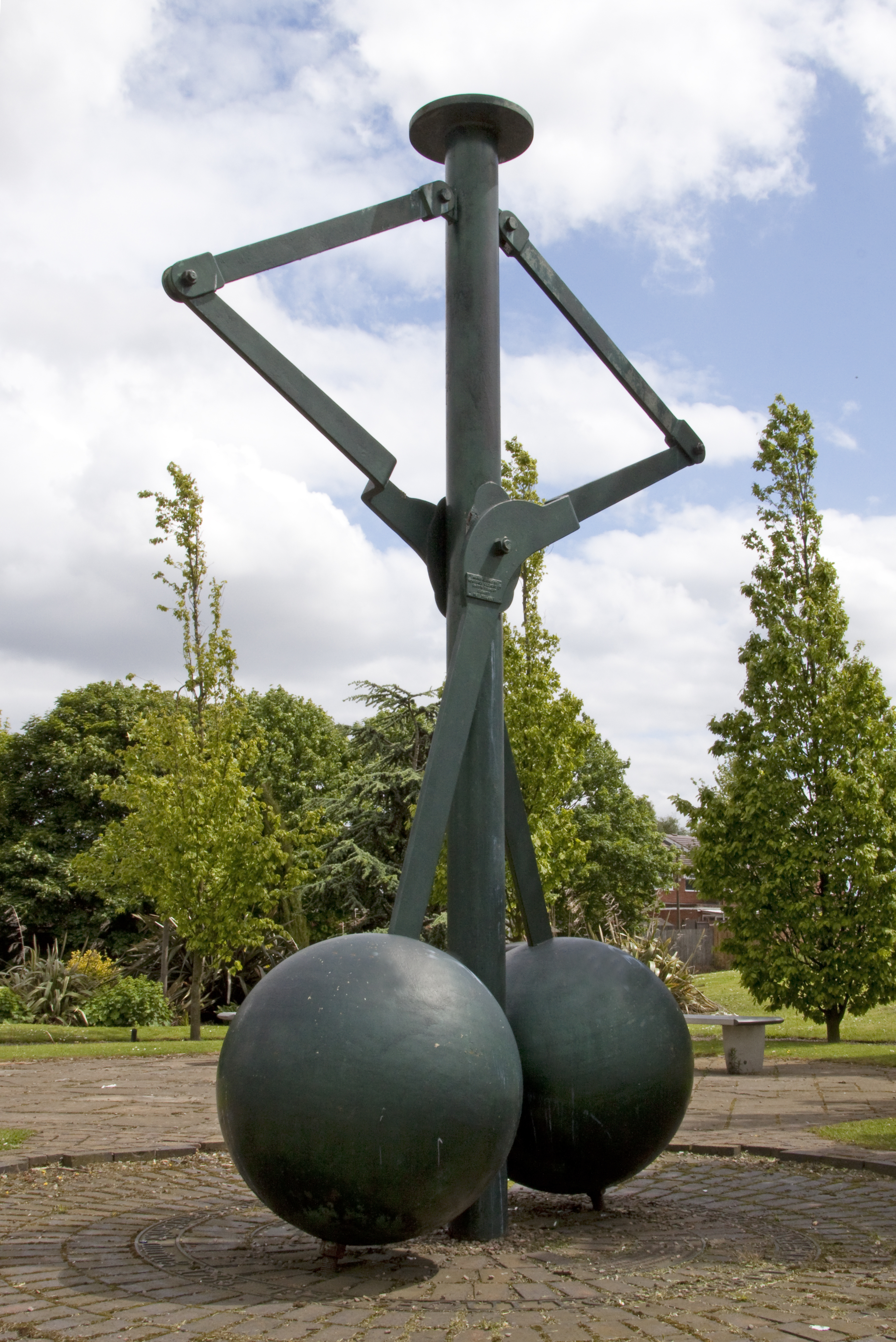
A memorial to Boulton and Watt industrial design, of a design, inspired by it, in Smethwick, England

A statue inspired by the Boulton and Watt governor design stands in Smethwick, in the English West Midlands. A centrifugal governor is part of the city seal and flag of Manchester, New Hampshire, in the U.S. (where a 2017 effort to change the design was rejected by voters). A centrifugal governor—described as an 18th-century industrial invention—features in Liu Cixin's science fiction novel, Death's End (from the Three-Body series), where it is used as a metaphor.

A stylized centrifugal governor is part of the coat of arms of the Swedish Work Environment Authority.

== See also ==
- Cataract (beam engine)
- Centrifugal switch
- Hit-and-miss engine
