= Cataract (beam engine) =

Speed governing device for steam engines

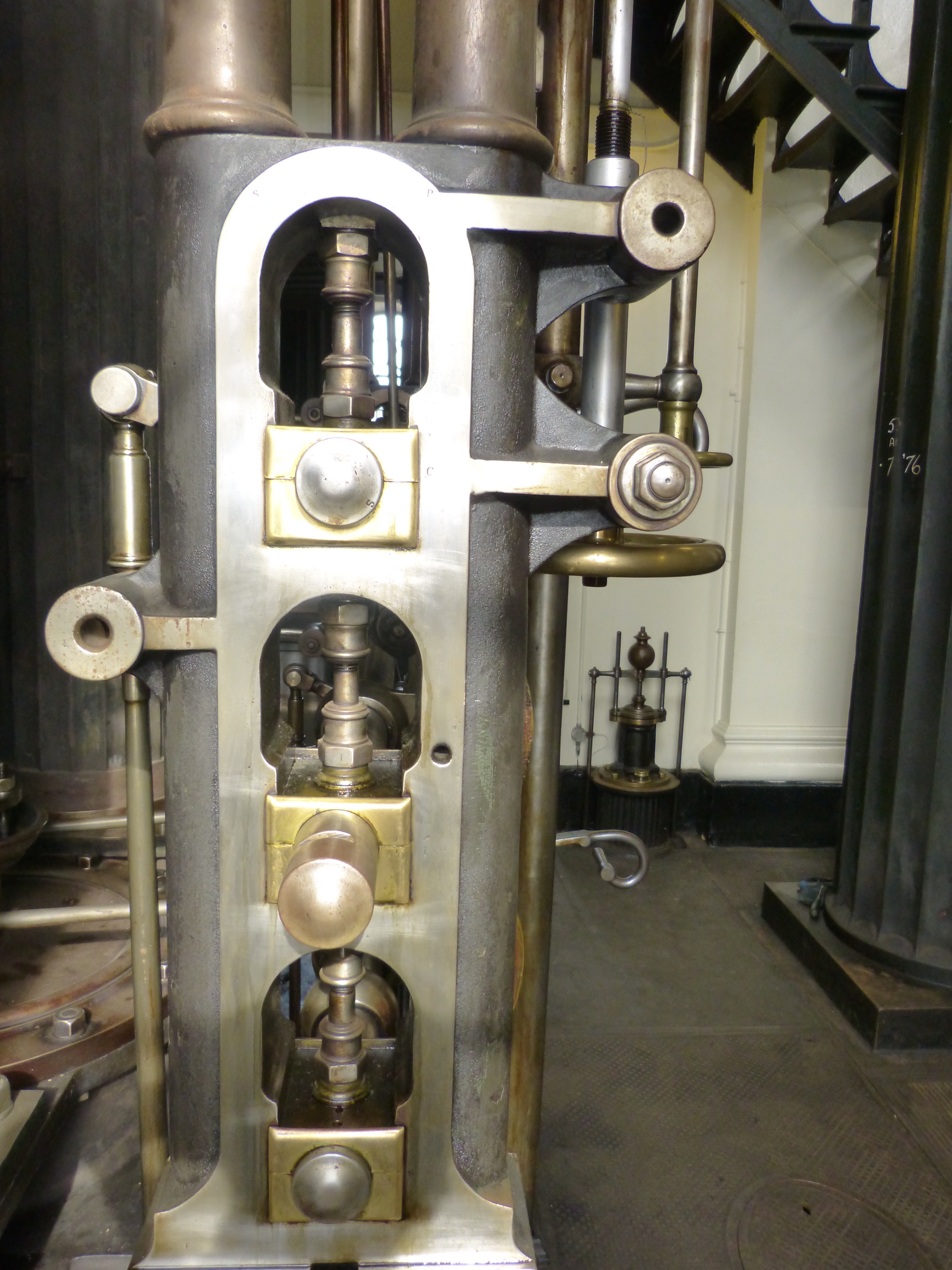
Valve gear of the 1846 Grand Junction engine at Kew Bridge; in the background is the cataract.

A cataract was a speed governing device used for single-acting beam engines, particularly (though not exclusively) Cornish engines. The earlier atmospheric engines also used cataracts, but these worked on a different principle.

The earlier type of cataract was a form of water clock: a 'tumbling cup' was gradually filled with water. When it reached a certain level, the water caused the cup to tip over, which (via a chain link to a lever) opened the injection cock to start the working cycle. After each return cycle, the piston would remain at the top of the cylinder until the cup had refilled (the number of strokes per minute could be adjusted by varying the flow of water into the cup).

In its later form, the cataract was 'a kind of hydraulic governor, consisting of a plunger-pump with a reservoir attached': the plunger gradually descended, which (by way of a release-mechanism) delayed the opening of the steam and exhaust valves to the main cylinder; in this way, the cataract controlled the interval between successive strokes of the engine.

In either case, the cataract is distinctly different from the centrifugal governor, in that it does not control the speed of the engine's stroke, but rather the timing between strokes.

== Operation ==
The typical installation of a house-built beam engine spanned four floors. The cylinder and the engine driver's usual working position were located in the 'bottom chamber', approximately at ground level. Above this were the 'middle chamber', with the cylinder top cover and 'top nozzle' (the upper valve chest), and above that the 'top chamber' or beam chamber. The earlier type of cataracts, used on atmospheric engines, were located on the middle floor, above the valve gear and connected to it via a chain. The later type, used with Cornish engines, were positioned at a lower level and connected to the valve gear via rods and underfloor linkages.

=== Cornish engines ===
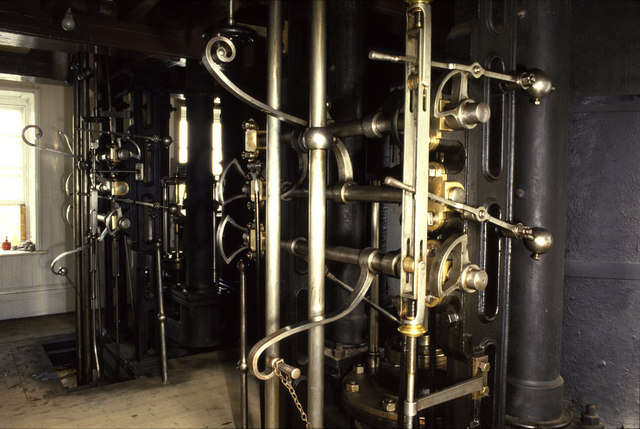
Valvegear, horns and arbors of the Crofton Pumping Station. The vertical rod nearest the camera, which releases the arbors at the start of each cycle, is controlled by the cataract.

The valve gear (or 'working gear') of a Cornish engine is based on the plug rod. This is a vertical rod, hung from the beam, and moving in parallel to the piston. Adjustable tappets are attached to this rod. These tappets strike long curved iron levers or 'horns' that are carried on three horizontal shafts or 'arbors'. (Note: Some Cornish winding engines had their valves arranged across different number of arbors, although their basic operation remains the same.) Each arbor works one of the engine's valves. For the Cornish cycles, these valves are the upper steam inlet to the top of the cylinder, the equilibrium valve that links upper and lower portions of the cylinder, and the lower exhaust and condensing water injection valves, which share an arbor.

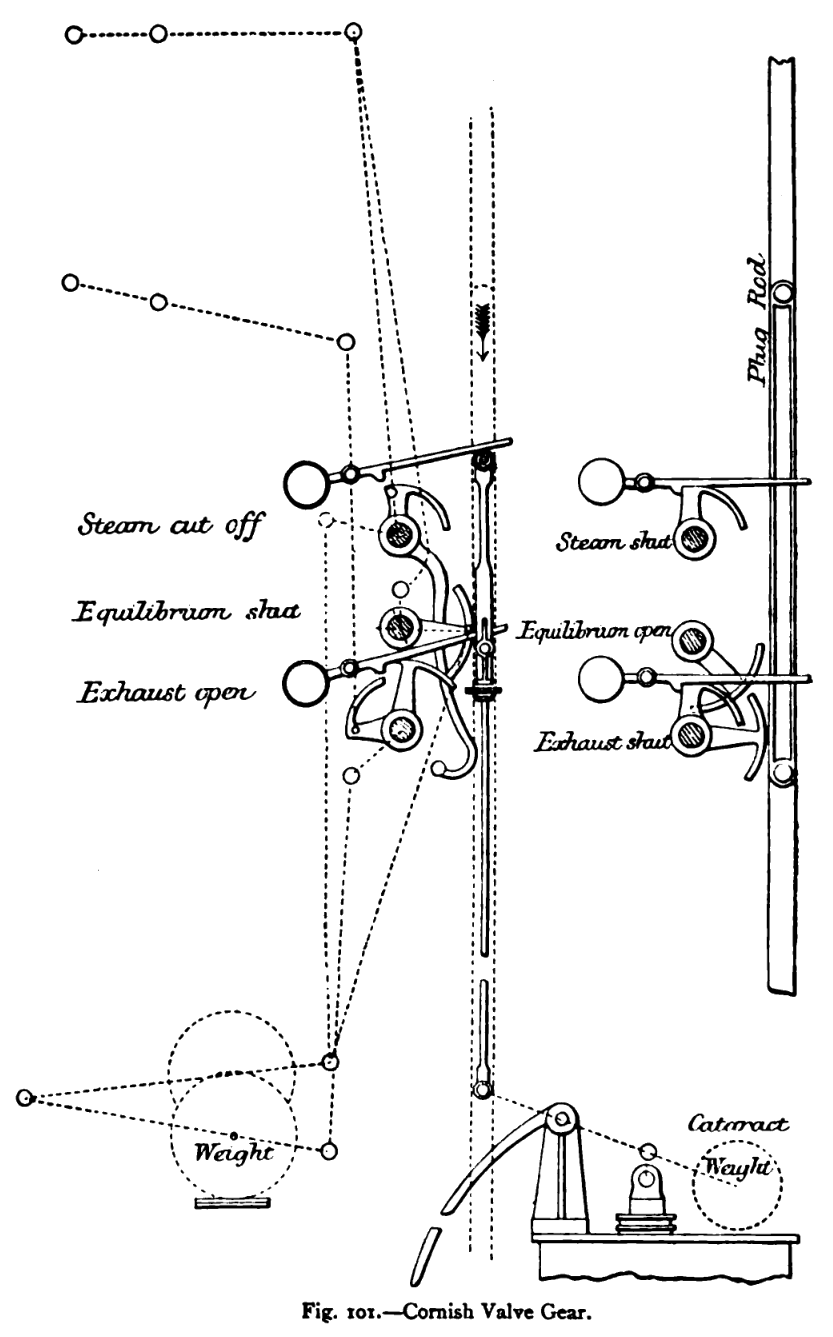
Diagrammatic representation of the valve gear of a Cornish engine. The Steam and Exhaust valves are locked shut (right) until released by the cataract (left).

By means of a cataract, these engines could be made to run intermittently: making a single stroke, then stopping and waiting for the valves to be released (by the cataract) to begin the next stroke. The speed of each power stroke was a feature of the engine and was not easily varied, but there was no need for the engines to run continuously, stroke after stroke. This was a direct contrast to the rotative beam engine, and the rotary nature of almost all other steam engines.

Use of a cataract could allow an engine to be operated at only a third of its ungoverned speed. When pumping load was variable, cataracts could also be connected and disconnected as required, allowing the engine to work at full speed for a period and then stopped in between.

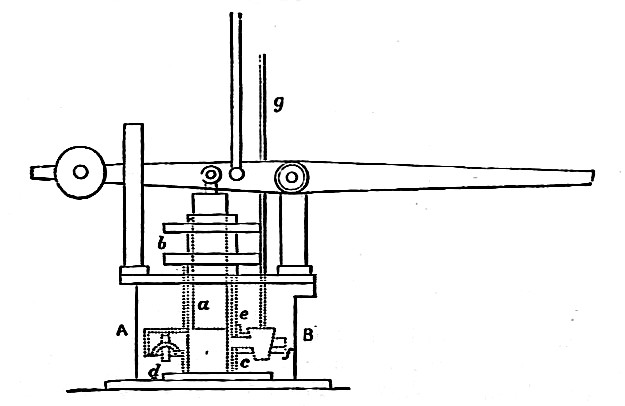
Cataract, c. 1875

The cataract itself resembled a small plunger pump. It was an iron box in a cistern filled with water, with a plunger or piston set in the top and pressed downwards by a weight. The water within the pump could only escape through a small tap or valve. As the plunger gradually fell, its motion was passed, by a rocking lever and a rod, upwards to the valvegear. Once the rod had risen sufficiently, this opened the first valve to admit steam into the upper part of the cylinder, beginning a new stroke. (Note: This was the initiation of a stroke with the Cornish cycle. For a Newcomen engine, the cataract triggered the water injection valve that caused condensation in the cylinder, and thus the beginning of the power stroke.)

Once the stroke had begun, the cataract's rocking lever was pushed downwards by the engine. This lifted the plunger, which acted as a suction pump within the cataract to refill the plunger box, through a flap valve from its surrounding cistern. The cistern was kept filled with water by the pump that the engine itself was working.

The water outlet valve was controlled by a rod from the bottom chamber. This was used by the engine's driver to control the working speed, according to the work required.

The cataract's actuating rod also had a screw adjuster, which acted to vary the phasing between the inlet and exhaust valves. This could be used to give a longer and more effective condensation time, if the condensing water supply was warm, as in the Summer. This adjustment appears to have been poorly understood though, and little used by the engine drivers.

== Development ==
=== Early cataracts ===
The cataract first appeared on Newcomen engines in Cornwall, although their inventor is unknown. They were known in Smeaton's time, and they may be another of the developments to Newcomen's engine for which he was responsible. James Watt encountered these on his trip to Cornwall in 1777. They were of a simpler type, these early cataracts or 'jack in the box' were a simple tumbling box: a wooden box on a pivot was filled with water through an adjustable cock. When the box was filled sufficiently to overbalance, the engine's injection valve would be triggered.

With the original Newcomen cycle, the speed of the return stroke varied according to the boiler pressure, although this still did not affect the strength or speed of the power stroke.

=== Watt ===
Boulton and Watt used the simple tumbling box design of cataract for some years afterwards, to around 1779. After this other designs were used, including a water cataract where the same water was used and recycled continuously and also an air cataract using a circular bellows. An air cataract of this type was supplied for the Ale and Cakes Mine. The plunger pump design of cataract had appeared in Cornwall by 1785, but was not Watt's invention.

== Open loop control ==
Unlike the Watt centrifugal governor, the cataract is an open-loop, rather than closed-loop control. The cataract runs at its own speed, but does not measure the resultant speed of the engine. The cataract has also been described as a 'water clock'. This assumes that the relationship between the cataract's operation and the engine's speed is fixed, which is a valid assumption for a beam engine as the cataract controls the timing of the engine's stroke, rather than a variable power or throttle valve. Where a governor controls such a throttle valve, as for the Watt governor, the speed of the engine depends on a complex and unpredictable relation between the engine load, the valve position and the varying efficiency of the engine. Such governors must use a closed-loop control if they are to maintain an effective and precise regulation.

=== Synchronisation ===
One advantage of the independent and open loop nature of the cataract's control was that two engines could be adjusted to run in synchronisation, but in antiphase. With pumping engines, this gave a more even output to their pumping.

=== Centrifugal governor ===
With a rotative engine, it was necessary to control the rate at which an engine moved throughout its stroke, not merely to vary the timing between strokes. This required the use of a throttle valve in the steam supply. As the load on engines uses could vary, closed-loop control such as the engine speed-based centrifugal governor was also needed. The cataract was thus not used on rotative engines.

Cornish engines were not amenable to control by a throttle valve, as their operating cycle depended on the condensation time more than a throttled steam supply. Non-rotative beam engines also had no easy means to drive a centrifugal governor. For these reasons the cataract remained in service for as long as the Cornish engine did.

== Later use of the term ==
The term 'cataract' became a synonym for dashpot, at least where this was associated with steam engines and their governors. They were used as a damping device to avoid over-sensitivity with centrifugal governors.

Cataracts were also used as an over-speed safety device for direct-acting water pumps. (Note: These were the type of small reciprocating pump commonly used as boiler feedwater pumps and often described as the 'Weir' type.) A seesaw or 'differential' lever was placed between the pump's piston rod and a cataract adjusted for the pump's normal working speed. If the pump suddenly accelerated, owing to the pump bursting or similar, the piston would overtake the cataract and the action of the differential lever would then close the pump's steam inlet valve and stop the pump, limiting possible damage.
