= Cornish engine =

Type of steam beam engine

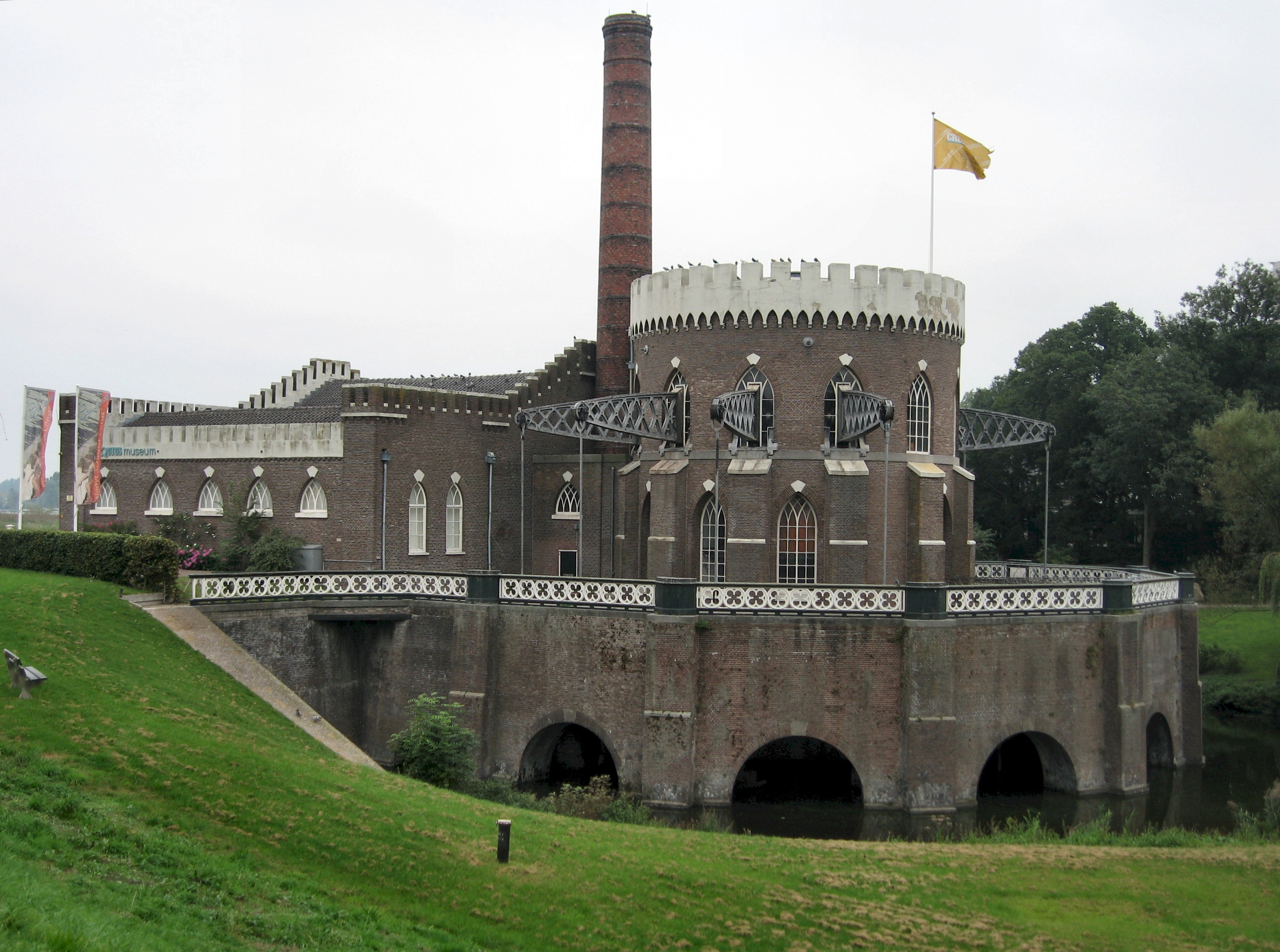
The pumping station at Cruquius in the Netherlands, showing the beams of the pumping engine emerging from the supporting wall

A Cornish engine is a type of steam engine developed in Cornwall, England, mainly for pumping water from a mine. It is a form of beam engine that uses steam at a higher pressure than the earlier engines designed by James Watt. The engines were also used for powering man engines to assist the underground miners' journeys to and from their working levels, for winching materials into and out of the mine, and for powering on-site ore stamping machinery. The principal advantage of the Cornish engine was its increased efficiency, which was important in Cornwall due to the high cost of coal. Several Cornish engines are preserved in England, with the largest collection at the London Museum of Water & Steam.

== Background ==
Cornwall long had tin, copper and other metal ore mines, but if mining were to take place at greater depths, a means to dewater the mine would be needed. Lifting the weight of water up from the depths requires great amounts of work input. This energy may be weakly supplied by horse power or a waterwheel to operate pumps, but horses have limited power and waterwheels need a suitable stream of water. Accordingly, the innovation of coal-fired steam power to work pumps was more versatile and effective to the mining industry than primitive means.

The mine Wheal Vor had one of the earliest Newcomen engines (in-cylinder condensing engines, utilising sub-atmospheric pressure) before 1714, but Cornwall has no coalfield and coal imported from south Wales was expensive. The cost of fuel for pumping was thus a significant part of mining costs. Later, many of the more efficient early Watt engines (using an external condenser) were erected by Boulton and Watt in Cornwall. They charged the mine owners a royalty based on a share of the fuel saving. The fuel efficiency of an engine was measured by its "duty", expressed in the work (in foot-pounds) generated by a bushel (94 pounds (43 kg)) of coal. Early Watt engines had a duty of 20 million, and later ones over 30 million.

== Efficiency ==
The principal advantage of the Cornish engine was its increased efficiency, accomplished by making more economical use of higher-pressure steam. At the time, improvements in efficiency were important in Cornwall because of the high cost of coal; there are no coal fields in Cornwall and all the coal used had to be brought in from outside the county, typically from Wales.

Increasing the boiler pressure above the virtually atmospheric pressure steam used by James Watt was an essential element of the improvement in efficiency of the Cornish engine. Simply increasing the boiler pressure would have made an engine more powerful without increasing its efficiency. The key advance was allowing the steam to expand in the cylinder. While James Watt had conceived of the idea of allowing expansive working of steam—and included it in his 1782 patent, he realized that the low steam pressure of his application made the improvement in efficiency negligible, and so did not pursue it.

In a Watt engine, steam is admitted throughout the piston's power stroke. At the end of the stroke, the steam is exhausted, and any remaining energy is wasted in the condenser, where the steam is cooled back to water.

In a Cornish engine, by contrast, the intake valve is shut off midway through the power stroke, allowing the steam in the cylinder to expand through the rest of the stroke to a lower pressure. This results in the capture of a greater proportion of its energy, and less heat being lost to the condenser, than in a Watt engine.

Other characteristics include insulation of steam lines and the cylinder, and steam jacketing the cylinder, both of which had previously been used by Watt.

Few Cornish engines remain in their original locations, the majority having been scrapped when their related industrial firm closed.

The Cornish engine developed irregular power throughout the cycle, completely pausing at one point while having rapid motion on the down stroke, making it unsuitable for rotary motion and most industrial applications. This also requires some unusual valve gear, see Cornish engine valve gear.

=== Cycle ===
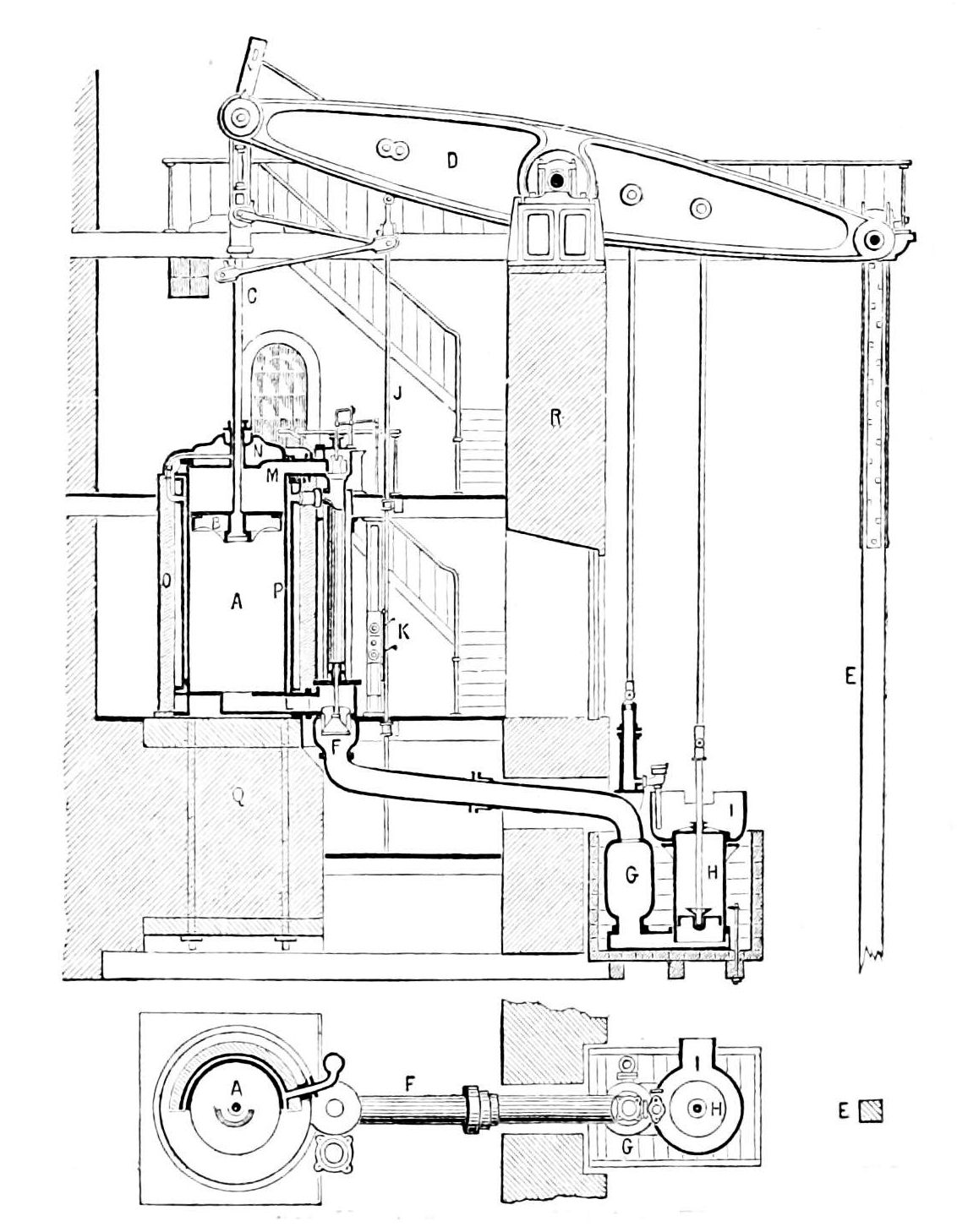
Section, circa 1877

The Cornish cycle operates as follows.

Starting from a condition during operation with the piston at the top of the cylinder, the cylinder below the piston full of steam from the previous stroke, the boiler at normal working pressure, and the condenser at normal working vacuum,

1. The pressurized steam inlet valve and low-pressure steam exhaust valves are opened. Pressurized steam from the boiler enters the top part of the cylinder above the piston, pushing it down, and the steam below the piston is drawn into the condenser, creating a vacuum below the piston. The pressure difference between the steam at boiler pressure above the piston and the vacuum below it drives the piston down.
2. Part way down the stroke, the pressurized steam inlet valve is closed. The steam above the piston then expands through the rest of the stroke, while the low-pressure steam on the other side (bottom) of the piston continues to be drawn into the condenser, thereby maintaining the partial vacuum in that part of the cylinder.
3. At the bottom of the stroke, the exhaust valve to the condenser is closed and the equilibrium valve is opened. The weight of the pump equipment down in the mine, transferred by the walking beam, draws the piston up, and as the piston comes up, steam is transferred through the equilibrium pipe from above the piston to the bottom of the cylinder below the piston.
4. When the piston reaches the top of the cylinder, the cycle is ready to repeat.

The next stroke may occur immediately, or it may be delayed by a timing device such as a cataract, if it was not necessary for the engine to work at its maximum rate, reducing the rate of operation saved fuel.

The engine is single-acting, and the steam piston is pulled up by the weight of the pump piston and rodding. Steam may be supplied at a pressure of up to 50 pounds per square inch (340 kPa).

Real photos showing the components of the schematic design (East Pool mine Tailer's shaft Harvey's Engine):

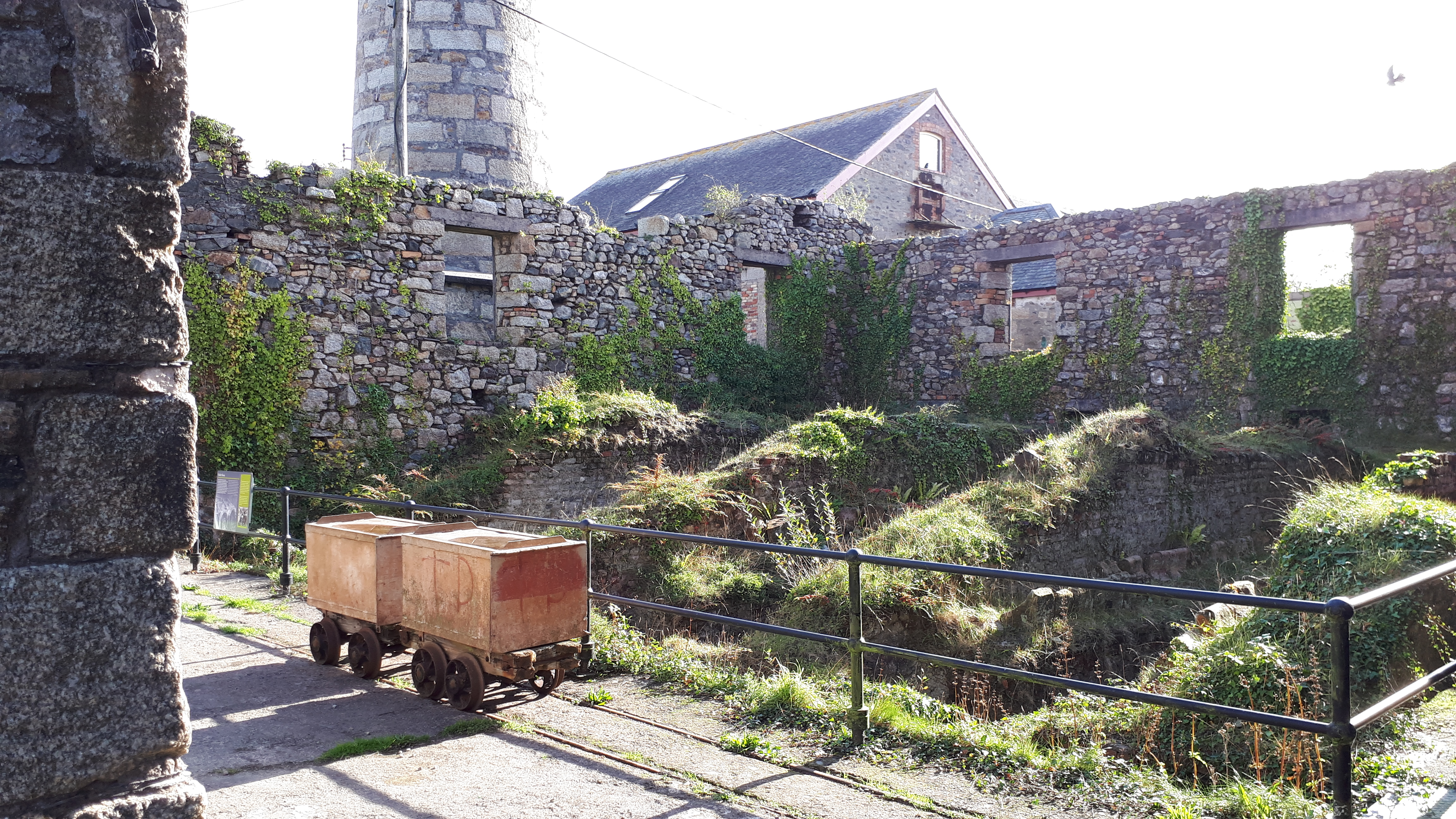
Steam boilers

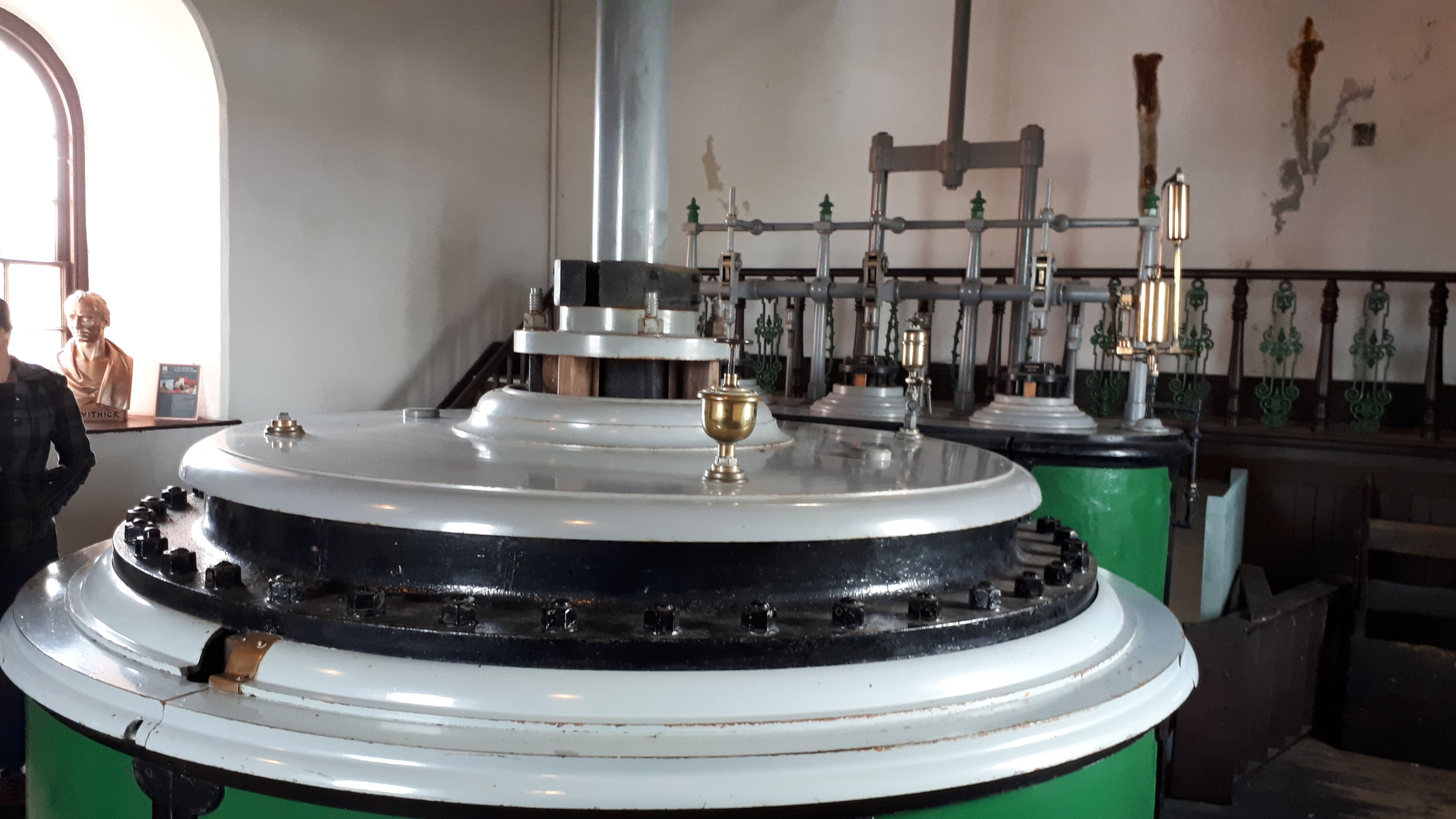
Main steam cylinder (A)

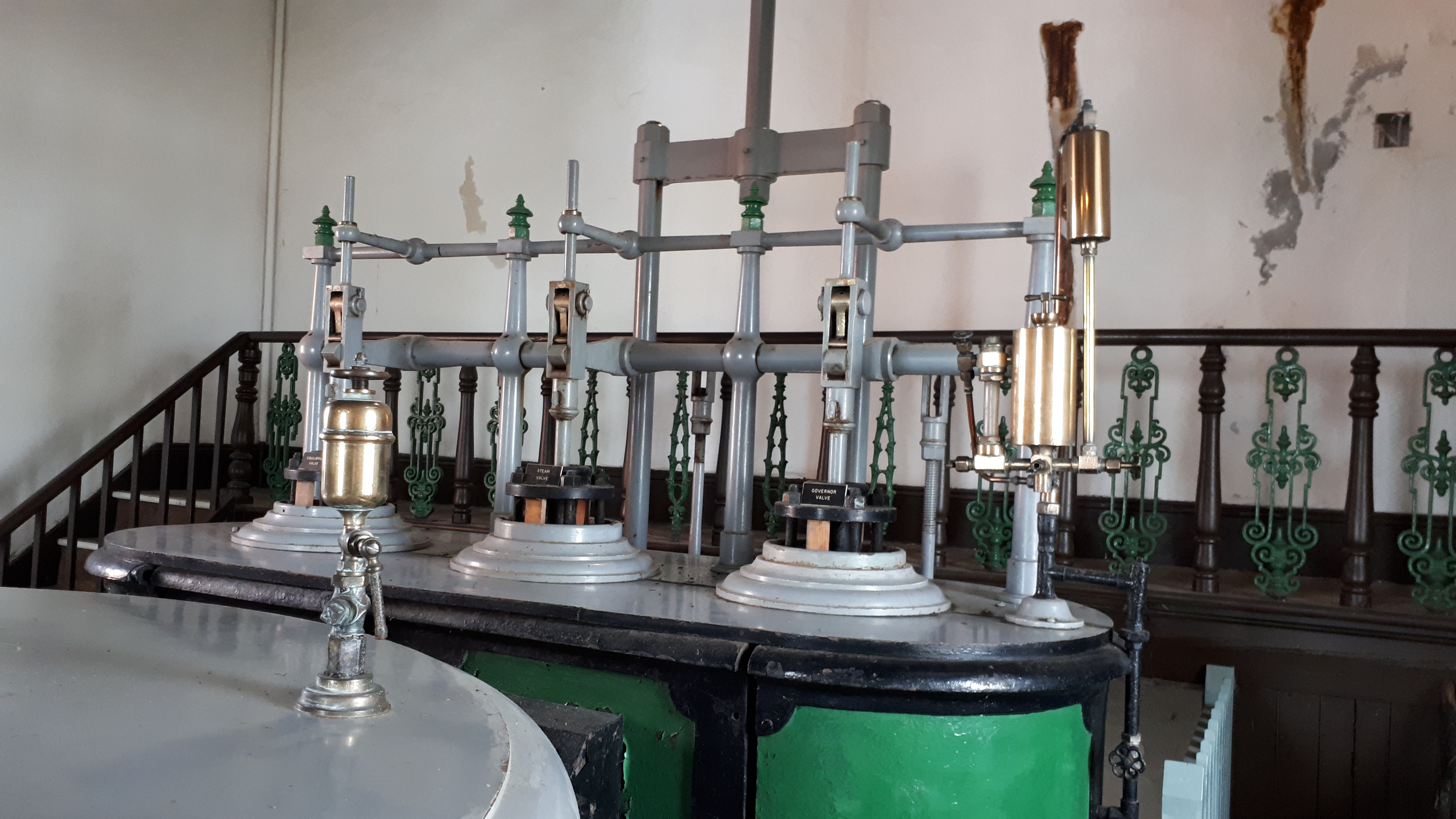
Control steam
cylinders (G-H)

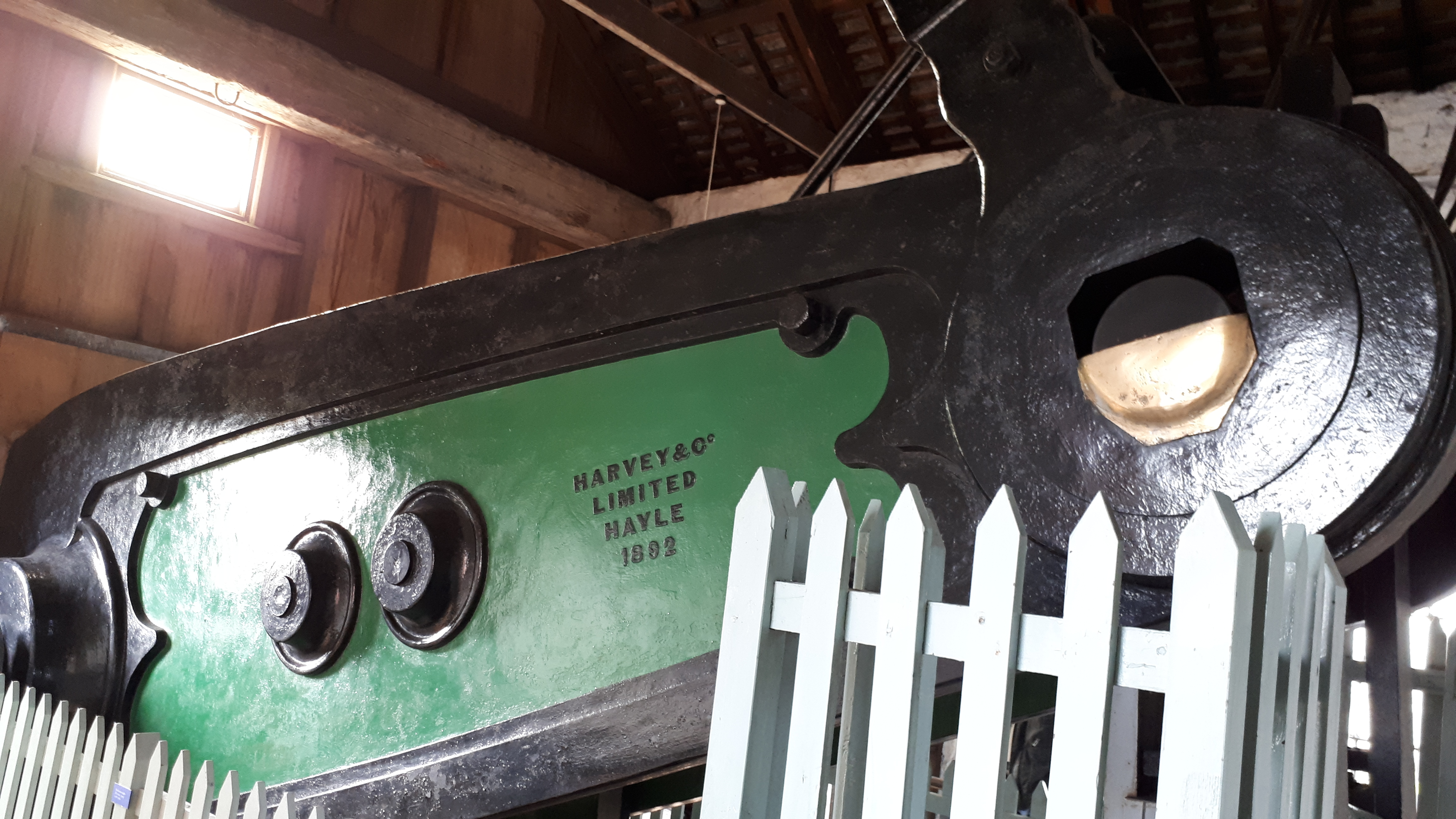
Pump lever (D)

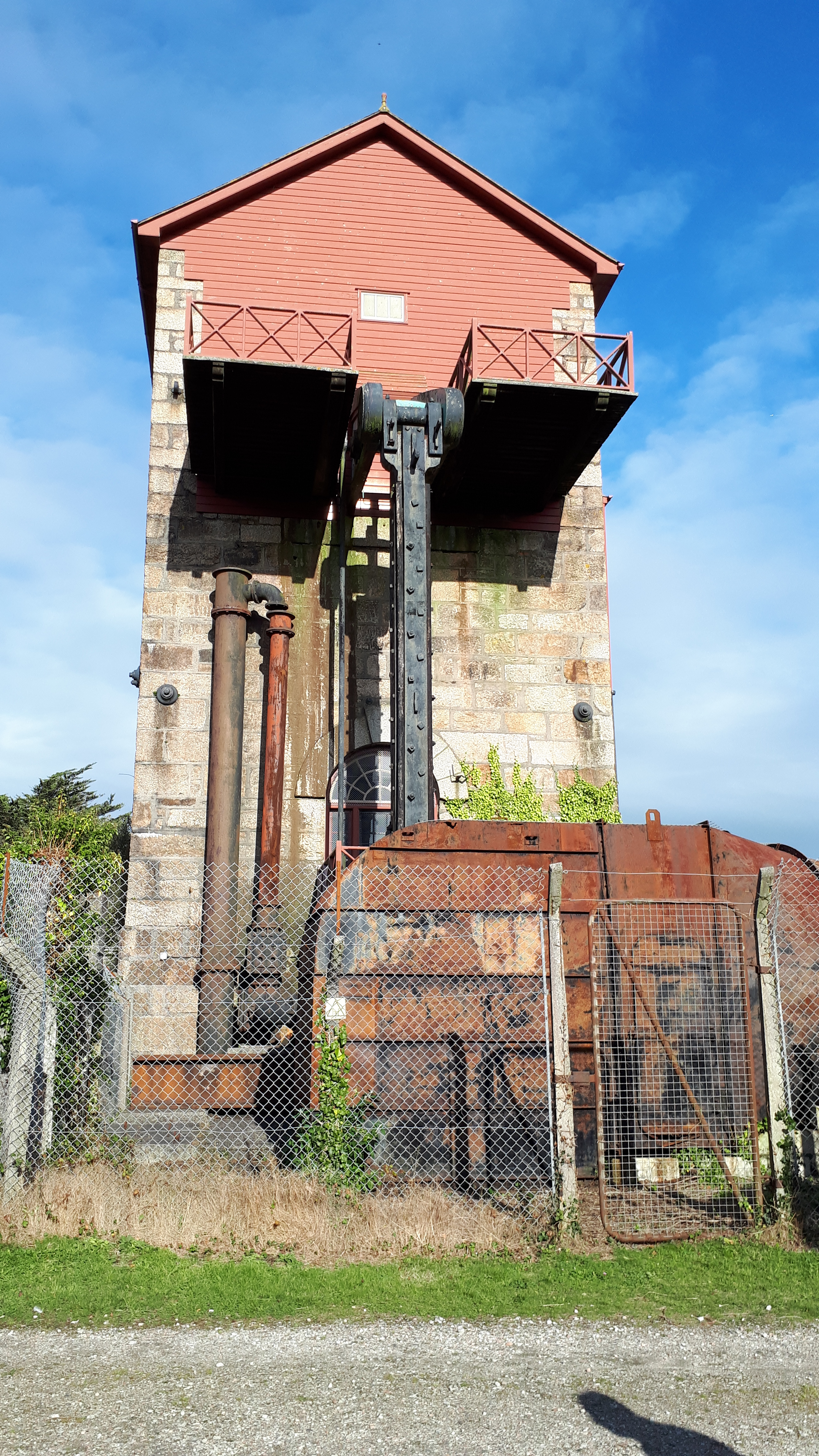
Engine house and pump piston (E)

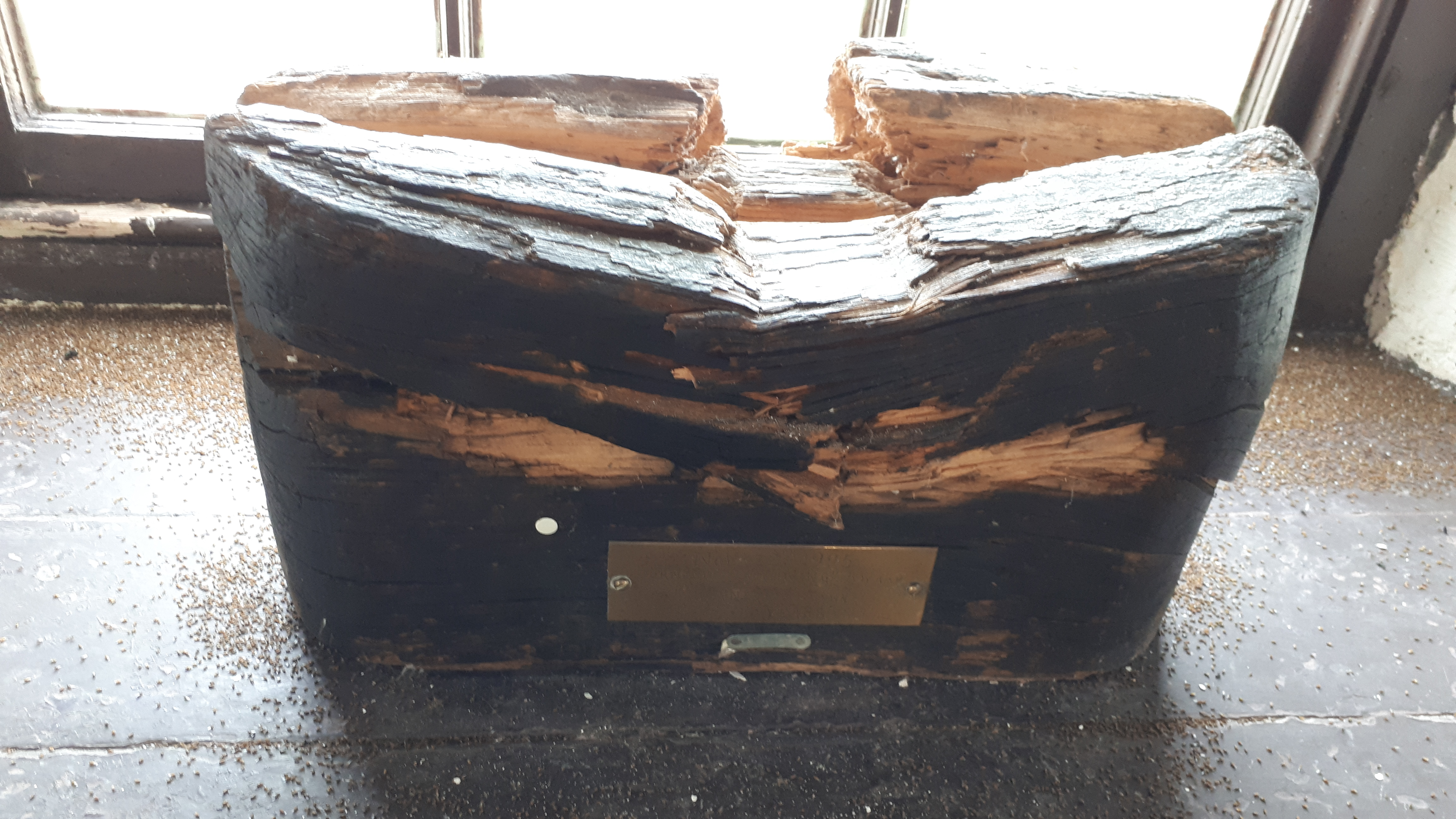
Sacrifice block in the engine house of Taylor's Shaft East Pool mine

== Development ==
The Cornish engine depended on the use of steam pressure above atmospheric pressure, as devised by Richard Trevithick in the 19th century. His early puffer engines discharged steam into the atmosphere. This differed from the Watt steam engine, which moved the condensing steam from the cylinder to a condenser separate from the cylinder; hence Watt's engine depended on the creation of a vacuum when the steam was condensed. Trevithick's later engines (in the 1810s) combined the two principles, starting with high-pressure steam which was then passed to the other side of the piston, where it condensed and there it acted as a sub-atmospheric pressure engine. In a parallel development Arthur Woolf developed the compound steam engine, in which the steam expanded in two cylinders successively, each of which were at pressures above atmospheric.

When Trevithick left for South America in 1816 he passed his patent right of his latest invention to the engineer William Sims, who built or adapted a number of engines, including one at Wheal Chance operating at 40 pounds per square inch (280 kPa) above atmospheric pressure, which achieved a duty of nearly 50 million, but its efficiency then fell back. A test was carried out between a Trevithick type single-cylinder engine and a Woolf compound engine at Wheal Alfred in 1825, when both achieved a duty of slightly more than 40 million.

The next improvement was achieved in the late 1820s by Samuel Grose, who decreased the heat loss by insulating the pipes, cylinders, and boilers of the engines, improving the duty to more than 60 million at Wheal Hope and later to almost 80 million at Wheal Towan. Nevertheless, the best duty was usually a short-lived achievement due to general deterioration of machinery, leaks from boilers, and the deterioration of boiler plates (meaning that pressure had to be reduced).

Minor improvements increased the duty somewhat, but the engine seems to have reached its practical limits by the mid-1840s. With pressures of up to 50 pounds per square inch (340 kPa), the forces are likely to have caused machinery breakages. The same improvements in duty occurred in engines operating Cornish stamps and whims, but generally came slightly later. In both cases the best duty was lower than for pumping engines, particularly so for whim engines, whose work was discontinuous.

The impetus for the improvement of the steam engine came from Cornwall due to the high price of coal there, but both capital and maintenance costs were higher than a Watt steam engine. This long delayed the installation of Cornish engines outside Cornwall. A secondhand Cornish engine was installed by Thomas Wicksteed at the Old Ford waterworks of the East London Waterworks company in 1838, and compared to a Watt engine with favourable results, because the price of coal in London was even higher than in Cornwall. Cornish engines became widely used for water supply around the world. In the main textile manufacturing areas, such as Manchester and Leeds, the coal price was too low to make replacement economic. Only in the late 1830s did textile manufacturers begin moving to high-pressure engines, usually by adding a high-pressure cylinder, forming a compound engine, rather than following the usual Cornish practice.

== Preservation ==
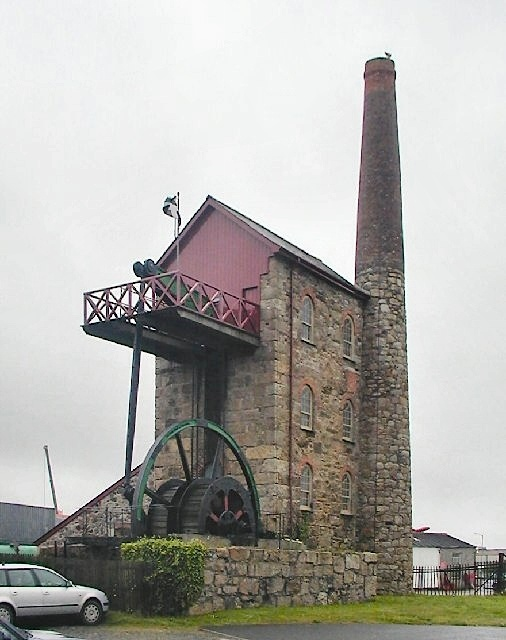
One of the preserved engine houses at Pool, housing a 30-inch engine

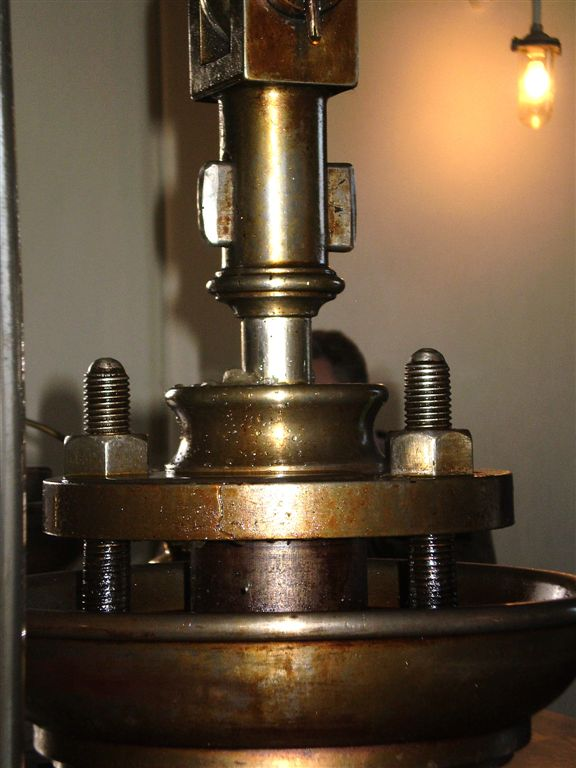
Valve rod of engine at London Museum of Water & Steam

Several Cornish engines are preserved in England. The London Museum of Water & Steam has the largest collection of Cornish engines in the world. At Crofton Pumping Station, in Wiltshire are two Cornish engines, one of which (the 1812 Boulton and Watt) is the "oldest working beam engine in the world still in its original engine house and capable of actually doing the job for which it was installed", that of pumping water to the summit pound of the Kennet and Avon Canal. Two examples also survive at the Cornish Mines and Engines museum on the site of East Pool mine near the town of Pool, Cornwall.

Another example is at Poldark Mine at Trenear, Cornwall – a Harvey of Hayle Cornish Beam Engine from about 1840–1850, originally employed at Bunny Tin Mine and later at Greensplat China Clay Pit, both near St Austell. It no longer works as a steam engine but is instead moved by a hydraulic mechanism. In use at Greensplat until 1959, it is the last Cornish engine to have worked commercially in Cornwall. It was moved to Poldark in 1972.

The Cruquius pumping station in the Netherlands contains a Cornish engine with the largest diameter cylinder ever built for a Cornish engine, at 3.5 metres (140 inches) diameter. The engine, which was built by Harvey & Co in Hayle, Cornwall, has eight beams connected to the one cylinder, each beam driving a single pump. The engine was restored to working order between 1985 and 2000, although it is now operated by an oil-filled hydraulic system, since restoration to steam operation was not viable.

The 1879 pair of engines preserved at Dalton Pumping Station in County Durham were the only Cornish Engines designed to run on superheated steam. One of the last Cornish engines to be built was installed at the Dorothea Slate Quarry in 1904, where it remains within its engine house.

The Cornish Engines Preservation Committee, an early industrial archaeology organisation, was formed in 1935 to preserve the Levant winding engine. The committee was later renamed for Richard Trevithick. They acquired another winding engine and two pumping engines. They publish a newsletter, a journal and many books on Cornish engines, the mining industry, engineers, and other industrial archaeological topics.

== See also ==
- Beam engine
- Mining in Cornwall and Devon
- Stationary steam engine
- Lean's Engine Reporter
- Cataract (beam engine)
