= Lean's Engine Reporter =

Historical publication

Lean's Engine Reporter was founded in 1810 to publicize the performances of different Cornish engines used for mine pumping in Cornwall. The first Reporter of Duty was Joel Lean. The Reporter, published monthly, gave, for each engine and its pumps, the number of strokes (measured by a counter kept in a locked box), and the amount of coal used. From this, and sizes of the pumps, the engine duty was found: this was the number of pounds of water raised one foot by a bushel of coal. Between 1810 and 1840 this reporting, and competition between engineers, raised the duty from around 20 million to 90 million pounds, a much higher efficiency than found in engines elsewhere at the same time. The improvements were an increase in the steam pressure used, full expansion to low pressure, and insulation to avoid heat loss.

The Reporter continued to be published by various members of Lean's family until 1904.

This open competition between engineers has been suggested as an early precursor of the free software movement, in which people engaged in collaborative development of technical knowledge.
