= Corliss steam engine =

Type of steam engine using rotary steam valves

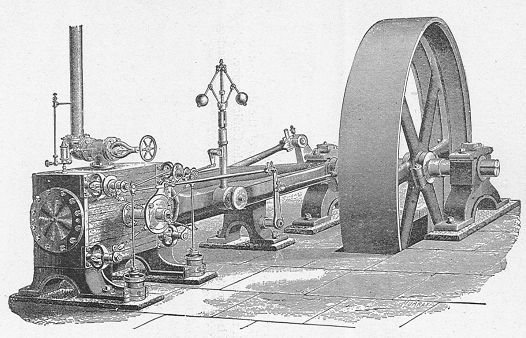
A Corliss steam engine – the valve gear is on the right of the cylinder block, on the left of the picture

A Corliss steam engine (or Corliss engine) is a steam engine, fitted with rotary valves and with variable valve timing patented in 1849, invented by and named after the US engineer George Henry Corliss of Providence, Rhode Island. Corliss assumed the original invention from Frederick Ellsworth Sickels (1819- 1895), who held the patent (1829) in the US patent office.

Engines fitted with Corliss valve gear offered the best thermal efficiency of any type of stationary steam engine until the refinement of the uniflow steam engine and steam turbine in the 20th century. Corliss engines were generally about 30 percent more fuel efficient than conventional steam engines with fixed cutoff. This increased efficiency made steam power more economical than water power, allowing industrial development away from millponds.

Corliss engines were typically used as stationary engines to provide mechanical power to line shafting in factories and mills and to drive dynamos to generate electricity. Many were quite large, standing many metres tall and developing several hundred horsepower, albeit at low speed, turning massive flywheels weighing several tons at about 100 revolutions per minute. Some of these engines have unusual roles as mechanical legacy systems and because of their relatively high efficiency and low maintenance requirements, some remain in service into the early 21st century. See, for example, the engines at the Hook Norton Brewery and the Distillerie Dillon in the list of operational engines.

== Corliss engine mechanisms ==
Corliss engines have four valves for each cylinder, with steam and exhaust valves located at each end. Corliss engines incorporate distinct refinements in both the valves themselves and in the valve gear, that is, the system of linkages that operate the valves.

The use of separate valves for steam admission and exhaust means that neither the valves nor the steam passages between cylinders and valves need to change temperature during the power and exhaust cycle, and it means that the timing of the admission and exhaust valves can be independently controlled. In contrast, conventional steam engines have a slide valve or piston valve that alternately feeds and exhausts through passages to each end of the cylinder. These passages are exposed to wide temperature swings during engine operation, and there are high temperature gradients within the valve mechanism.

Clark (1891) commented that the Corliss gear "is essentially a combination of elements previously known and used separately, affecting the cylinder and the valve-gear". The origins of the Corliss gear with regard to previous steam valve gear was traced by Inglis (1868).

=== Corliss valve gear ===
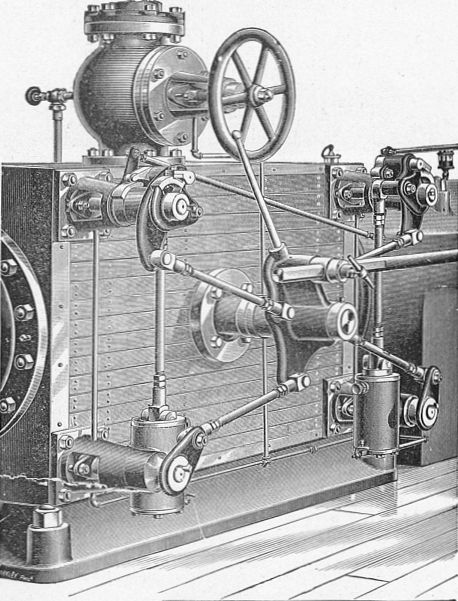
"Gordon's improved Corliss valvegear", detailed view. The wrist-plate is the central plate from which rods radiate to each of the four valves.

George Corliss received U.S. patent 6,162 for his valve gear on March 10, 1849. This patent covered the use of a wrist-plate to convey the valve motion from a single eccentric to the four valves of the engine, and it covered the use of trip valves with variable cutoff under governor control that characterize Corliss Engines. Unlike later engines, most of which were horizontal, this patent describes a vertical cylinder beam engine, and it used individual slide valves for admission and exhaust at each end of the cylinder.

The inlet valves are pulled open with an eccentric-driven pawl; when the pawl trips, the rapid closure is damped using a dashpot. In many engines, the same dashpot acts as a vacuum spring to pull the valves closed, but Corliss's early engines were slow enough that it was the weight of the dashpot piston and rod that closed the valve.

The speed of a Corliss engine is controlled by varying the cutoff of steam during each power stroke, while leaving the throttle wide open at all times. To accomplish this, the centrifugal governor is linked to a pair of cams, one for each admission valve. These cams determine the point during the piston stroke that the pawl will release, allowing that valve to close.

As with all steam engines where the cutoff can be regulated, the virtue of doing so lies in the fact that most of the power stroke is powered by the expansion of steam in the cylinder after the admission valve has closed. This comes far closer to the ideal Carnot cycle than is possible with an engine where the admission valve is open for the length of the power stroke and speed is regulated by a throttle valve.

The Corliss valve gearing allowed more uniform speed and better response to load changes, making it suitable for applications like rolling mills and spinning, and greatly expanding its use in manufacturing.

=== Corliss valves ===
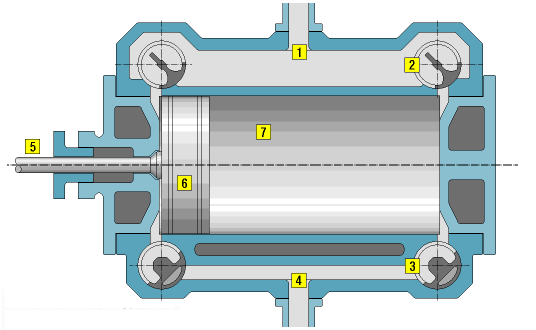
Sectioned cylinder, showing rotating valves

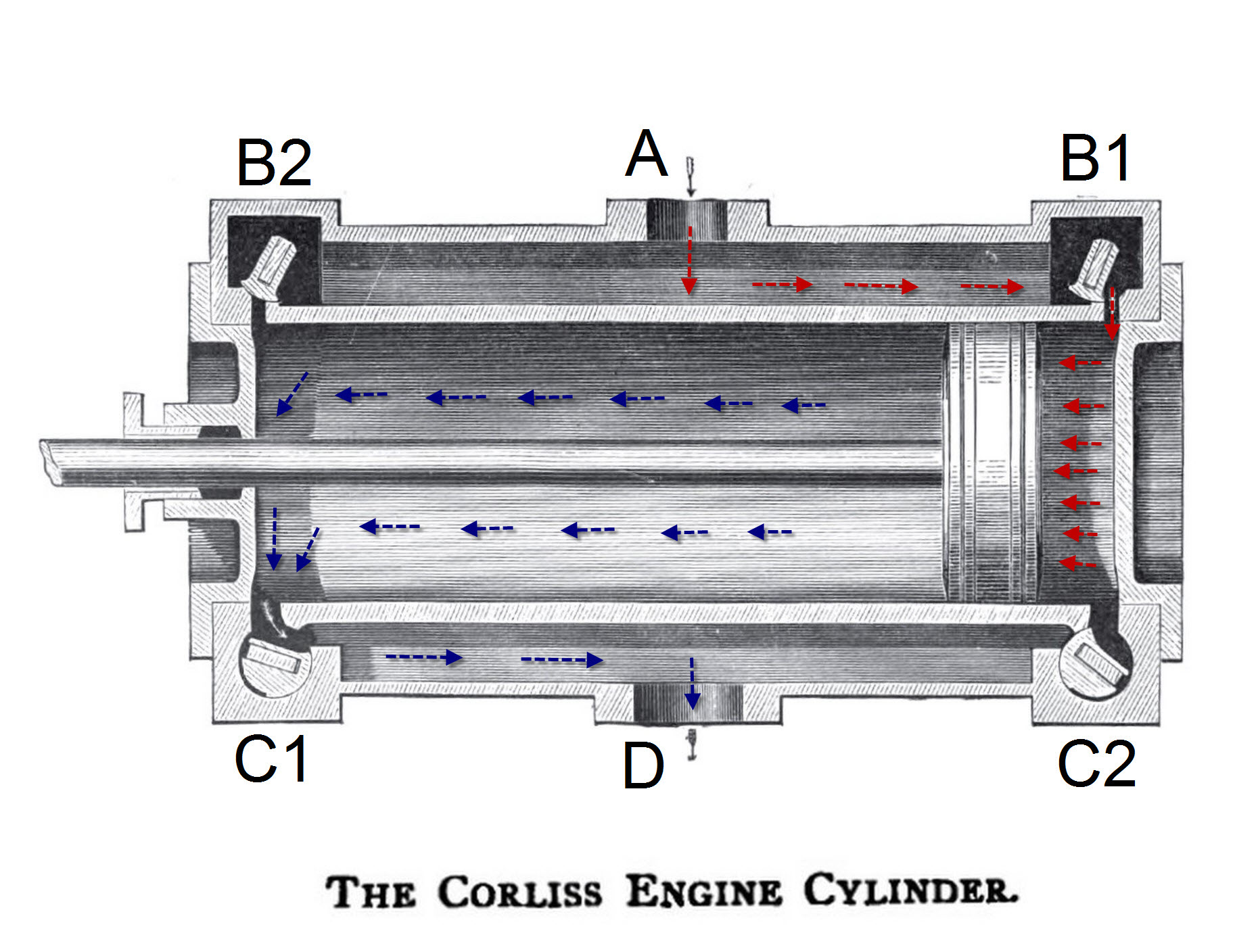
Detail of a Corliss-type valve gear and cylinder cross section showing the path of high-pressure steam (in red) and low-pressure steam (in blue). With each stroke, the four valves alternate opening and closing, driving the piston back and forth

Corliss valves open directly into the cylinder. The valves connect the cylinder to separate steam and exhaust plenums. Initially, Corliss used slide valves with linear actuators, but by 1851, Corliss had shifted to semi-rotary valve actuators, as documented in U.S. Patent 8253. In this engine, the wrist plate was moved to the center of the cylinder side, as on later Corliss engines. This was still a beam engine, however, and the semi-rotary valve actuators operated linear slide valves inside the four valve chests of the engine.

Corliss valves are in the form of a minor circular segment, rotating inside a cylindrical valve-face. Their actuating mechanism is off along the axis of the valve, thus they have little "dead space" such as the stem of a poppet valve and the entire port area can be used efficiently for gas flow.

As the area of a Corliss valve is small compared to the port area, the effects of gas flow generate relatively little torque on the valve axle compared to some other sorts of valve. These advantages have led to the Corliss form of valve being used in other roles, apart from steam engines with Corliss gear.

The Rolls-Royce Merlin aero-engine used a rectangular butterfly valve as a throttle. Gas-flow forces acting asymmetrically on this butterfly could lead to poor control of the power in some circumstances. Late models, from the 134, used a Corliss throttle valve instead to avoid this problem.

=== Barring and barring engines ===
A common feature of large Corliss engines is one or two sets of narrow gear teeth in the rim of the flywheel. These teeth allow the flywheel to be barred, that is, turned with the aid of a crowbar. This may be needed during engine maintenance, for example, to set the cutoff and admission valve timing, and it may be needed during engine starting.

The need for barring the engine during starting is most obvious on single-cylinder engines, where a careless engine operator might stop the engine with the piston in or near dead center. Once stopped in this state, the engine cannot be started under its own power, so it must be barred to a more favorable position for starting.

Large Corliss engines cannot be safely started cold, so it is common to admit low-pressure steam to both sides of the cylinder to warm up the metalwork. Turning the engine slowly during this process ensures that the entire engine is uniformly warmed, and it ensures that oil is uniformly distributed through the mechanism before applying power. Again, barring may be used to do this, although operators sometimes do this by careful manual manipulation of the valves.

For large engines, muscle powered barring is sufficiently difficult that barring engines are frequently installed. These are small engines with gear teeth cut to mate with the teeth on the flywheel. Generally, the drive gears of the barring engine are designed to automatically disengage if the engine begins running under its own power while the barring gears are engaged.

== Company history ==
The Corliss Steam Engine Company was originally known as Fairbanks, Clark & Co. in the 1830s. In 1843 it was renamed Fairbanks, Bancroft & Co. when Edward Bancroft joined the company. In 1846 it was renamed Bancroft, Nightingale & Co. when George H. Corliss joined the company, and in 1847 it was renamed Corliss, Nightingale and Co. In 1848 the company moved to the Charles Street Railroad Crossing in Providence, Rhode Island.

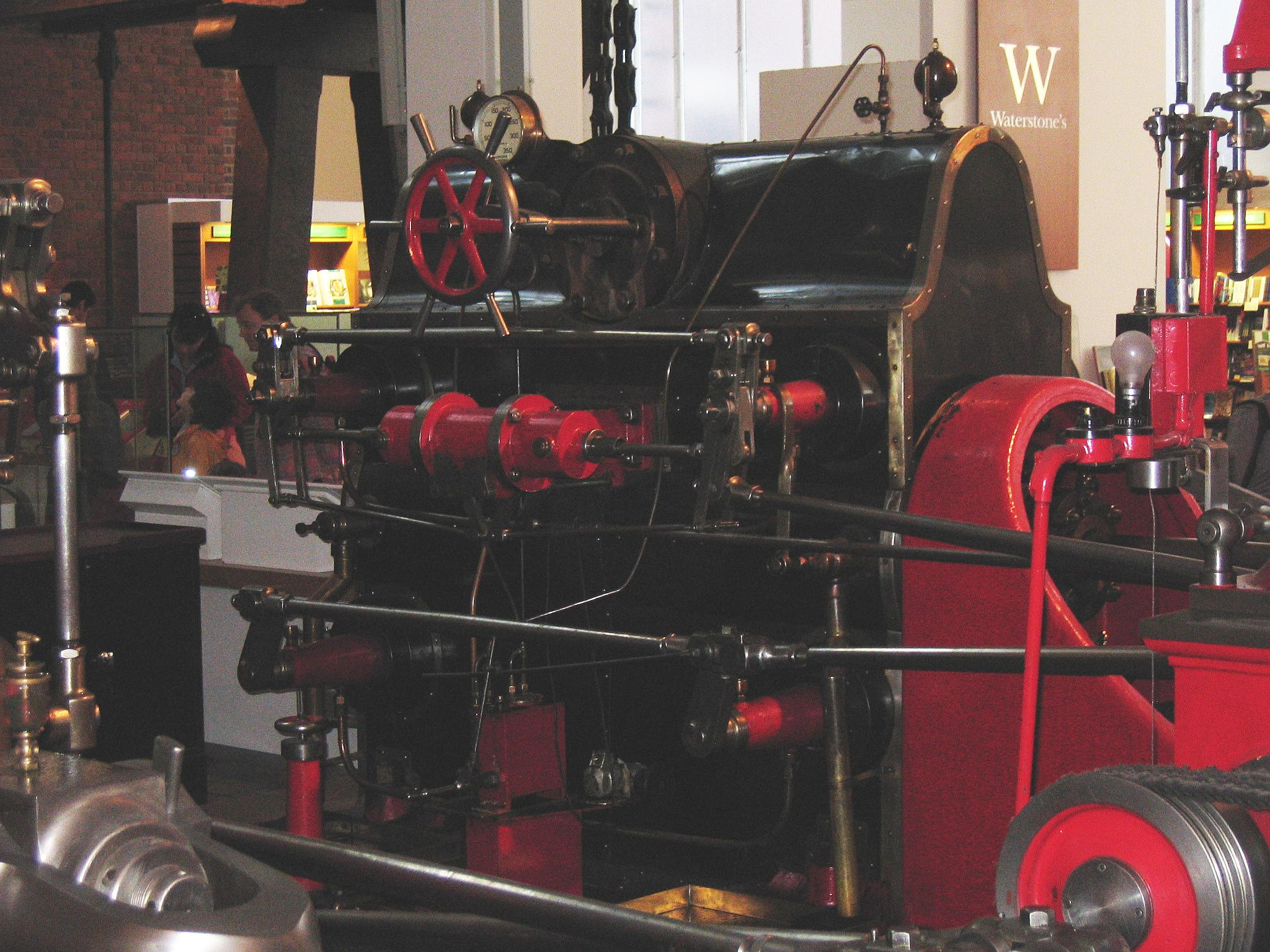
Valve gear typical of engines developed by Corliss competitors. The horizontal arrangement of the dashpots and the lack of a wrist plate avoided key claims in the Corliss patents.

In 1857 the company was renamed for the last time to Corliss Steam Engine Company. By 1864 Corliss bought out his partners and was the sole owner of the company.

By 1859, all of the key features of what we now know as the Corliss engine were in place. Patents granted to Corliss and others incorporated rotary valves and crank shafts in-line with the cylinders. See, for example, Corliss' U.S. Patent 24,618, granted July 5, 1859. Competing inventors worked hard to invent alternatives to Corliss' mechanisms; they generally avoided Corlis's use of a wrist plate and adopted alternative releasing mechanisms for the steam valves, as in Jamieson's U.S. Patent 19,640, granted March 16, 1858.

Corliss' 1849 patent expired in 1870; the term of this patent had been extended by U.S. Patent reissue 200 on May 13, 1851, and U.S. Patent reissues 758 and 763 on July 12, 1859. B. Hick and Son were first to introduce the Corliss engine into the United Kingdom about 1864. After 1870, numerous other companies began to manufacture Corliss engines. Among them, the William A. Harris Steam Engine Company, the Worthington Pump and Machinery Company, and Allis-Chalmers. In general, these machines were referred to as Corliss engines regardless of who made them.

In 1895 the company was shut down under the burden of $800,000 debt, and in 1900 it was sold to International Power Company controlled by industrialist Joseph H. Hoadley. In 1905 it was transferred to another Hoadley's firm, the American & British Manufacturing Corporation.

In 1925 the company merged into Franklin Machine Company. By then Franklin Machine Company was already owned by the William A. Harris Steam Engine Company.

As of 2024 there are approximately six engines with the original slide-valve mechanisms still in existence, including one at 7 South Stone Mill Drive along Mother Brook in Dedham, Massachusetts.

== Centennial Engine ==
The Corliss Centennial Engine was an all-inclusive, specially built rotative beam engine that powered virtually all of the exhibits at the United States Centennial Exhibition in Philadelphia in 1876 through shafts totaling over a mile in length. Switched on by President Ulysses S. Grant and Emperor Pedro II of Brazil, the engine was in public view for the duration of the fair.

The engine was configured as two cylinders side by side. Each cylinder was bored to 44 inches (112 cm) with a stroke of 10 feet (3.0 m). The Centennial Engine was 45 feet (14 m) tall, had a flywheel 30 feet (9.1 m) in diameter, and produced 1,400 horsepower (1,000 kW). After the fair it was disassembled and shipped back to Corliss's plant in Providence. Seven years later it was sold and powered a Chicago factory owned by George Pullman until 1910, when it was sold as scrap.

This engine became a cultural icon, so much so that to many modern historians the term Corliss Engine (or Corliss Steam Engine) refers to this specific engine and not to the broad class of engines fitted with Corliss valve gear.

Centennial steam engine
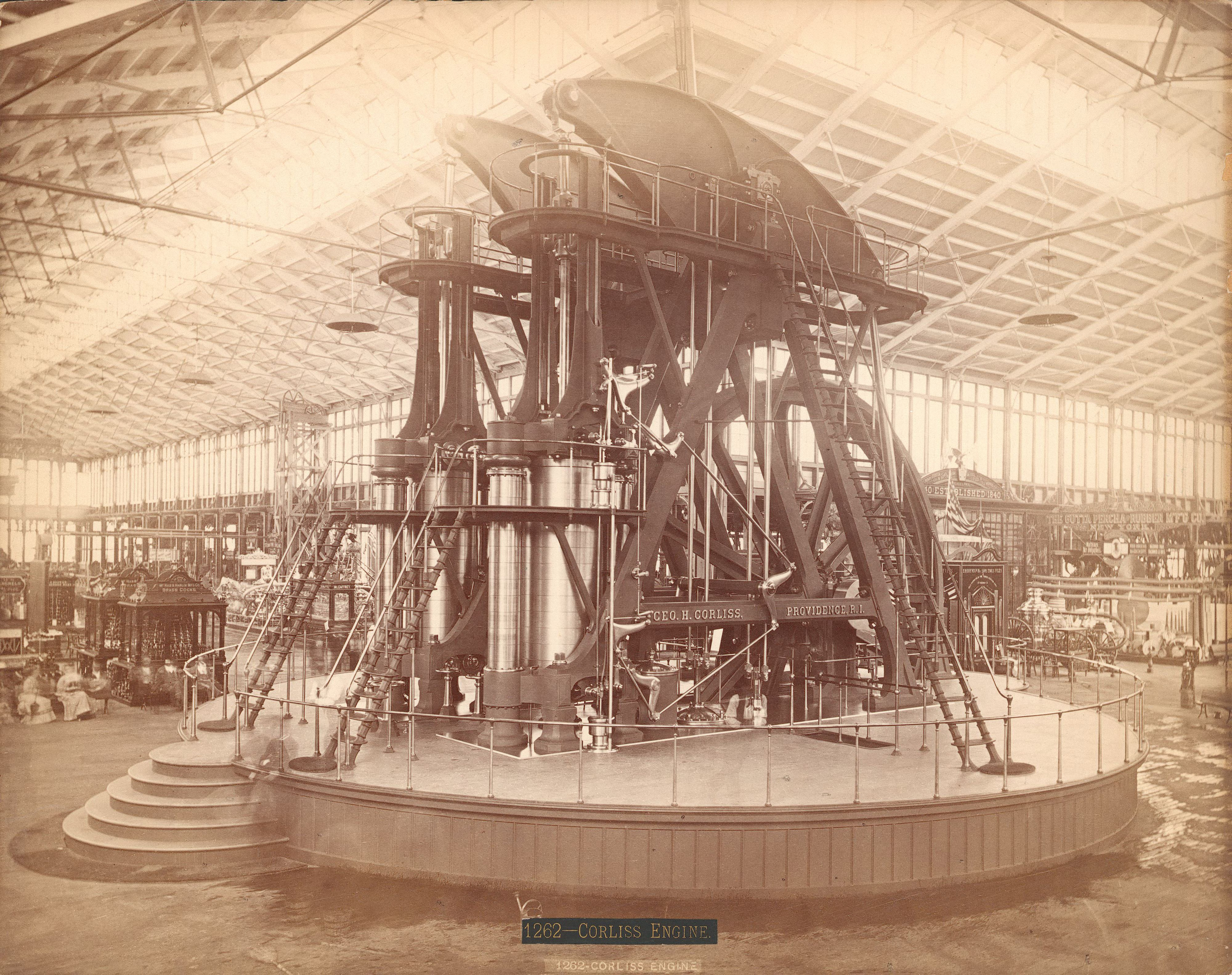
The Centennial Engine at the U.S. Centennial Exhibition in Philadelphia, 1876

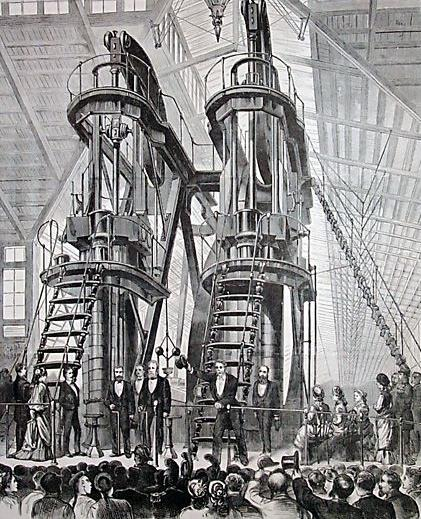
U.S. President Ulysses S. Grant and Emperor Pedro II of Brazil starting the Corliss Centennial Engine at the opening ceremonies of the Centennial Exhibition

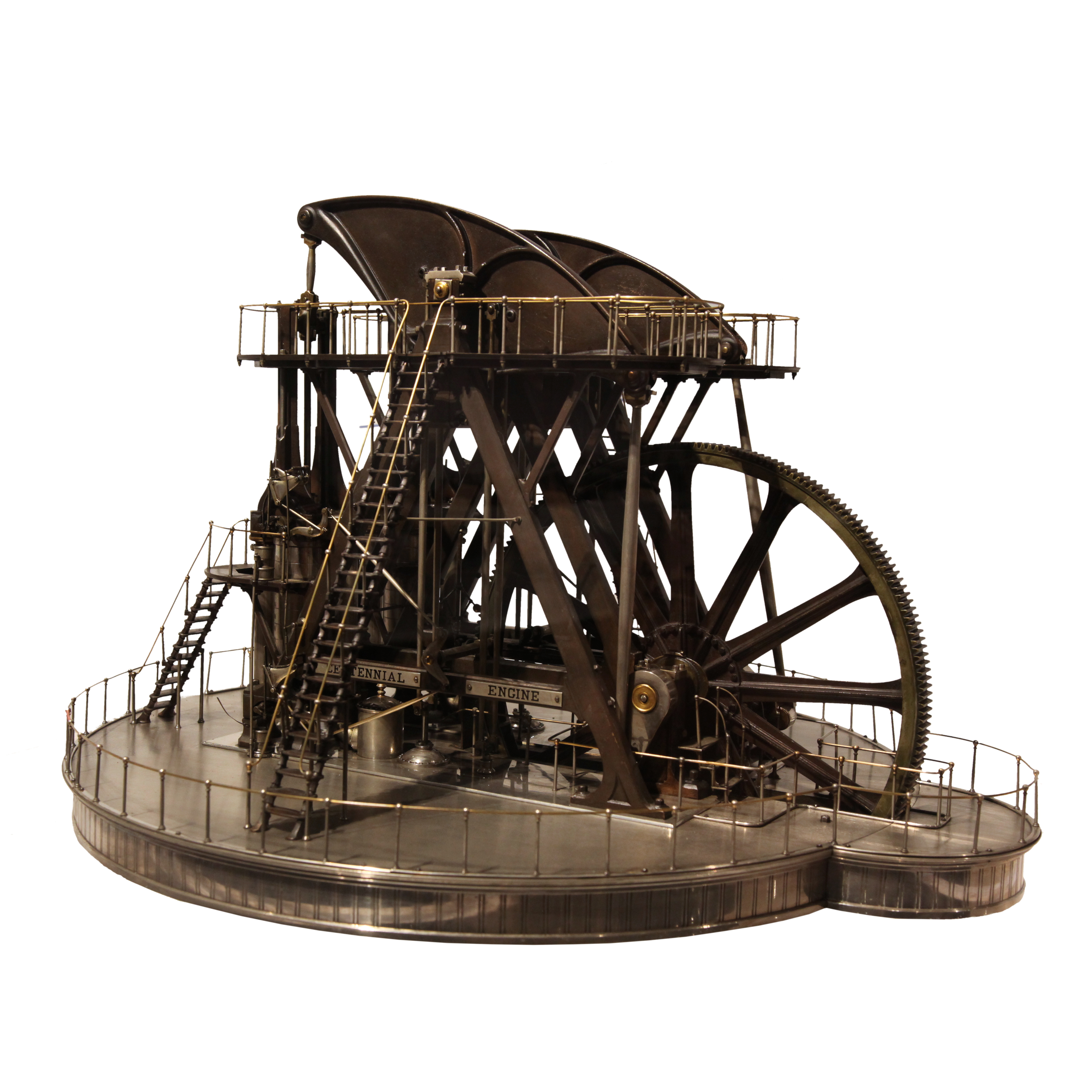
Model on display at the MIT Museum

== List of operational engines ==
The 1903 Burnley Ironworks Corliss mill engine in action at the Science Museum, London, England, UK.

Location	Date of manufacture	Date of installation	Horsepower	RPM	Citation
Albert City Threshermen & Collector Show	ca. 1920	Unknown	125	120	
Amador Sawmill	1904	2007	60	100	
Antique Gas and Steam Engine Museum	1911	1978	Unknown	80	
Antique Gas and Steam Engine Museum	1900	1986	Unknown	Unknown	
Arts et Metiers school of engineering of Lille	1900	1900	75	60	
Bancroft Shed	1920	1920	600	68	
Bolton Steam Museum	1902	1992	180	75	
Bolton Steam Museum	1914	1995	250	Unknown	
Bratch Pumping Station	1894 or 1895	1895 or 1896	Unknown	24	
Coldharbour Mill	1910	Unknown	300	Unknown	
Connecticut Antique Machinery Association	1910	2008	100	Unknown	
Denton Farm Park	1905	Unknown	350	Unknown	
Distillerie Dillon	1922	Unknown	Unknown	Unknown	
Ellenroad Ring Mill	1892	Unknown	2650	59	
Gladstone Pottery Museum	Unknown	1925	Unknown	Unknown	
Glenn Beedy Museum of Agriculture & Industry	1923	1992	100	100	
Grand Rapids Public Museum	1905	Unknown	Unknown	Unknown	
Glenwood Resource Center	1907	Dec 19, 1907	Unknown	120	
Hesston Steam Museum	Unknown	Unknown	Unknown	Unknown	
Hook Norton Brewery	Unknown	1899	25	Unknown	
Markham Grange Steam Museum	1909	1998	700	80	
Mill Meece Pumping Station	Unknown	Unknown	Unknown	Unknown	
Mississippi Industrial Heritage Museum	1905	2008	Unknown	Unknown	
Museo de la Caña de Azucar - Hacienda Piedechinche	Unknown	1950	Unknown	Unknown	
National Museum of Industrial History	1913	2015	400	42	[53]
New England Wireless and Steam Museum	1892	1978	150	80	
New England Wireless and Steam Museum	1892	1977	150	80	
New England Wireless and Steam Museum	1911	1969	150	80	
Nittany Antique Machinery Association	ca. 1900	ca. 1981	150	~100-120	
Old Thresher's Reunion Heritage Museum	Unknown	Unknown	750	36	
Old Thresher's Reunion Heritage Museum	1920	Unknown	600	150	
Old Thresher's Reunion Heritage Museum	1903	Unknown	125	110	
Old Thresher's Reunion Heritage Museum	Unknown	Unknown	Unknown	Unknown	
Old Thresher's Reunion Heritage Museum	Unknown	Unknown	Unknown	Unknown	
Owls Head Transportation Museum	ca. 1895	Unknown	600	Unknown	
Pawnee County Fairgrounds	1912	Unknown	Unknown	150	
Queen Street Mill	1895	1895	500	68	
Saraya Sugar Factory	Unknown	1925	Unknown	Unknown	
Science Museum, London: Burnley Ironworks Engine	1903	1903	700	76	
Stephenson County Antique Engine Club of Freeport, Illinois	1914	1989	1500	45	
The Henry Ford	1859	Unknown	500	70	
The Steam Museum	1900	1986	100	90	
Tokomaru Steam Museum	1916	1976	335	60	
Trencherfield Mill	1907	1907	2500	68	
Western Museum of Mining & Industry	1895	Unknown	500	100	

== Notable people ==
- William Wright (engineer)

== See also ==
- Corliss Steam Engine (Pawnee, Oklahoma)
- Piston valve
- Poppet valve
- Sleeve valve
- Slide valve
- Steam locomotive nomenclature
- Trip valve gear
- Valve gear
- Variable valve timing
