= Negrita =

Negrita may refer to:

- Negrita (band)
- Negrita (rum)
- Negrita Jayde (1958–2009), Canadian bodybuilder and actress
- Virgen de los Ángeles, the patron saint of Costa Rica, commonly referred to as la negrita
