= List of French rums =

France produces many kinds of rums in several locations. Most of the rums are cane juice rums or rhum agricoles. The distilleries are located in the French oversea departments and territories of La Réunion, Guadeloupe, French Guiana, Martinique and Saint Barthélemy. Martinique is, by far, the French island that has the most rum distilleries and brands. Below is a list of French rum distillers and brands organized by location.

== Metropolitan France ==
- Negrita (rum)
- BOWS Distillery
- Distillery O'Baptiste
- Distillery Coqlicorne
- Distillery Castan
- Distillery Moon Harbour
- Distillery ERIKA

== Guadeloupe ==
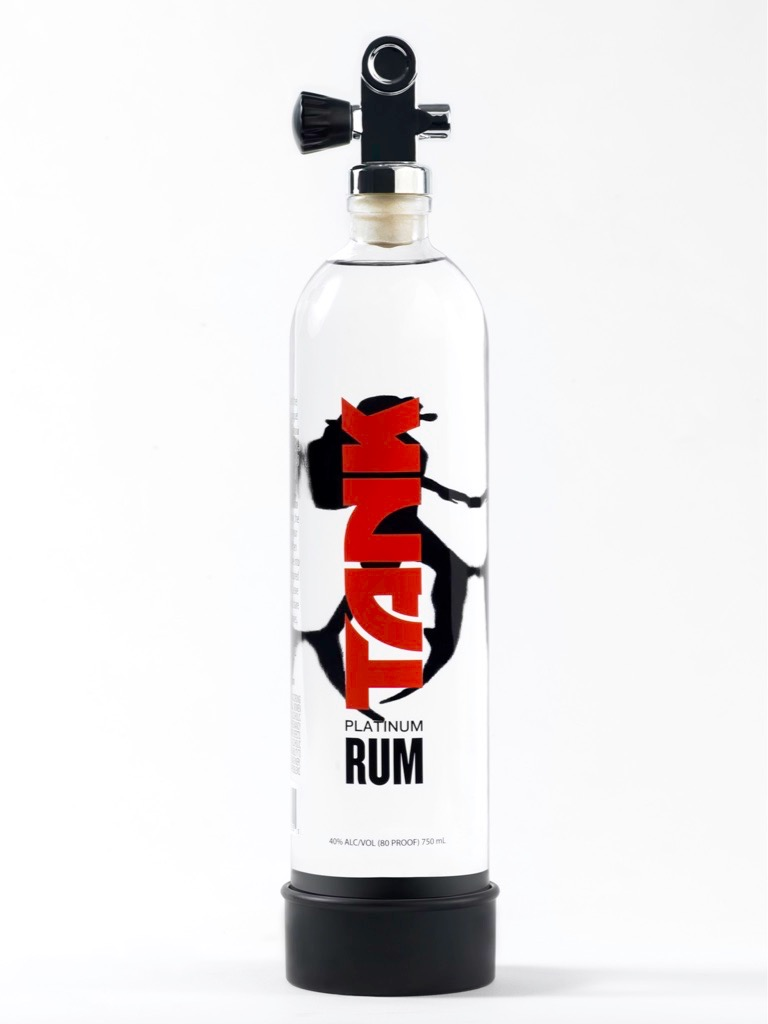
Tank Rum, distilled on La Réunion Island

- Bologne (rum)
- Damoiseau (rum)
- Montebello (rum)
- Mon Repos (rum)
- Longueteau (rum)
- Père Labat (rum)
- Séverin (rum)

== French Guiana ==
- Rhum Saint-Maurice

== La Réunion ==
- Rhum Charette
- Riviere du Mat (rum)
- Savanna (rum)
- Tank Rum

== Martinique ==
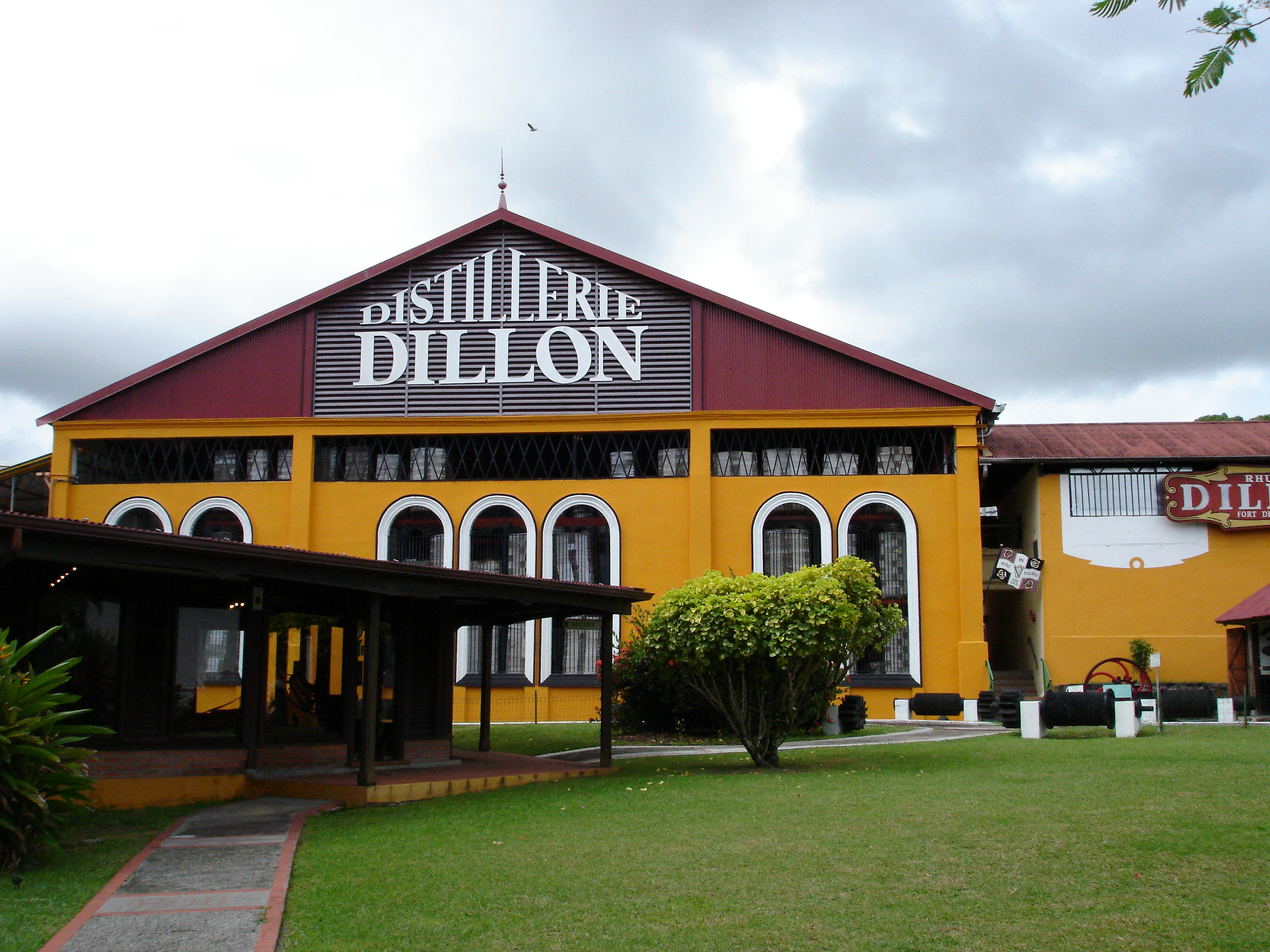
Distillerie Dillon, distiller of Rhum Dillon, in Martinique

- Rhum Clément
- Rhum Dillon
- Rhum du Père Labat
- Rhum J.M.
- Habitation Saint-Etienne
- J. Bally
- La Mauny
- Neisson distillery
- Rhum Depaz
- Saint James (rum)
- Trois Rivières (rum)

== Saint Barthélemy ==
- R. St Barth

== See also ==
- List of rum producers
