= Expansion valve (steam engine) =

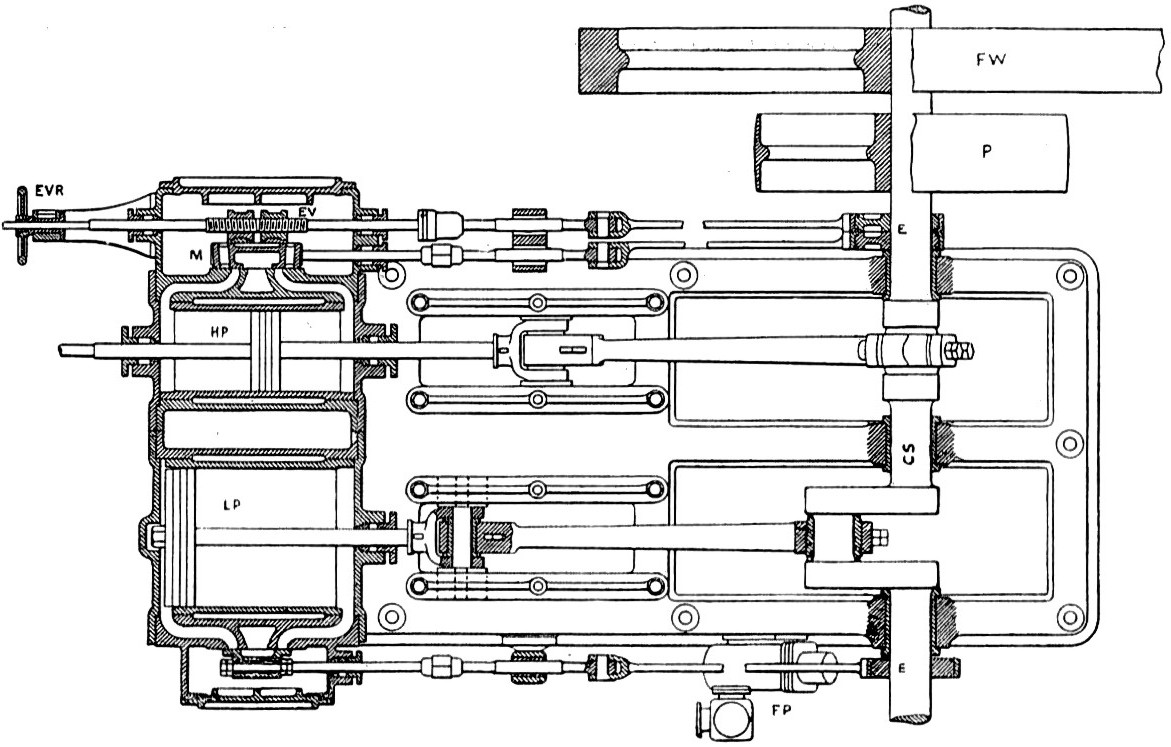
Cross compound engine, with an expansion valve (top) on the high-pressure cylinder

An expansion valve is a device in steam engine valve gear that improves engine efficiency. It operates by closing off the supply of steam early, before the piston has travelled through its full stroke. This cut-off allows the steam to then expand within the cylinder. This expanding steam is still sufficient to drive the piston, even though its pressure decreases as it expands. (Note: This fall of pressure with expansion is inevitable, according to Boyle's law.'"`UNIQ--ref-00000000-QINU`"') As less steam is supplied in the shorter time for which the valve is open, use of the expansion valve reduces the steam consumed and thus the fuel required. The engine (on 1875 figures) may deliver two-thirds of the work, for only one-third of the steam.

Indicator diagram showing steam pressure with piston movement

An expansion valve is a secondary valve within a steam engine. They represent an intermediate step between steam engines with non-expansive working and later valve gears that could provide for expansion by controlling the motion of a single valve.

Expansion valves were used for stationary engines and marine engines. They were not used for locomotives, although expansive working was achieved by the use of the later variable expansion valve gears.

== Need for varying expansion ==
The pressure of the expanded steam is less than that of steam supplied directly from the boiler. An engine working with an expansion valve set to an early cut-off is thus less powerful than with the valve fully open. Accordingly, the engine must now be driven, so that the valve is manually adjusted as the load on the engine changes. An engine running under light load may be operated efficiently with an early cut-off, an engine under heavy load may require a longer cut-off and the cost of more steam consumption.

When Trevithick supplied his 1801 engine (Note: This engine was one of the first to employ any cut-off and deliberate expansion of steam. However this cut-off was fixed and could not be varied whilst the engine was working.) for a rolling mill at Tredegar Iron Works, the engine was more powerful when worked without expansion and Samuel Homfray, the ironmaster, preferred to use the extra power despite the potential saving in coal costs

== Gridiron expansion valves ==
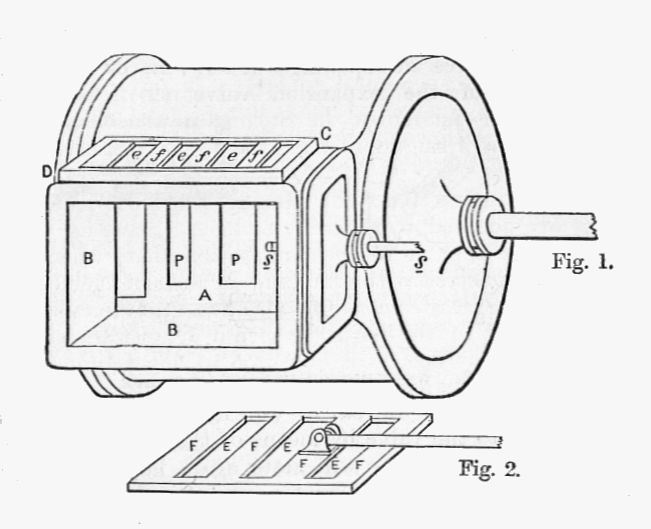
Independent gridiron valve, with conventional slide valve

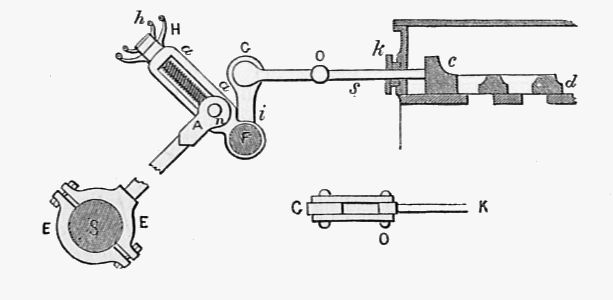
Eccentric and varying ratio linkage to drive a gridiron expansion valve

The gridiron valve was one of the first forms of expansion valve. The gridiron valve is an arrangement of two plates with overlapping slats. One plate can move so that its slats overlap either the slats of the other plate, or the slots between them, to thus be either open or closed. It has the advantages of a relatively large opening (up to half of the total area) and a rapid opening, needing to be moved by only one slat width to change from fully open to fully closed. Its disadvantage is that they do not seal particularly well. Because of the short actuating distance for a gridiron valve their valve timing would be relatively imprecise if used with an eccentric or similar. Some large steam engines later used them as primary valves, either as exhaust valves for LP cylinders or as inlet valves in conjunction with trip- or cam valve gear. (Note: A desmodromic cam-driven valve gear with very fast-acting gridiron valves driven at half crankshaft speed was a key feature of Ferranti's high-speed cross compound vertical generating engines.'"`UNIQ--ref-0000000B-QINU`"')

Where gridiron valves are used as secondary valves, they were commonly mounted on the inlet side of the valve chamber for the primary slide valve. They were driven by a separate valve gear, usually a separate eccentric set in advance of the main eccentric. When operating, the additional advance moves the gridiron valve to apply cut-off ahead of the main valve. To vary the expansion they provide, the stroke of the eccentric drive can be varied by an adjustable linkage. When this is adjusted to zero throw, the expansion valve remains fully open and the engine works without expansion. Although the use of a secondary gridiron valve was an early technique, it also remained in service with increasingly sophisticated valves and actuation, throughout the history of stationary engines. McIntosh and Seymour engines used one driven by a cam and toggle arrangement that moved intermittently and stood still when open, giving precise timing, and independent adjustment of each valve movement.

Gridiron valves were also used on the backs of slide valves, in the manner of the Meyer valve. This was a patent of John Turnbull of Glasgow in 1869.

== Meyer expansion valve ==
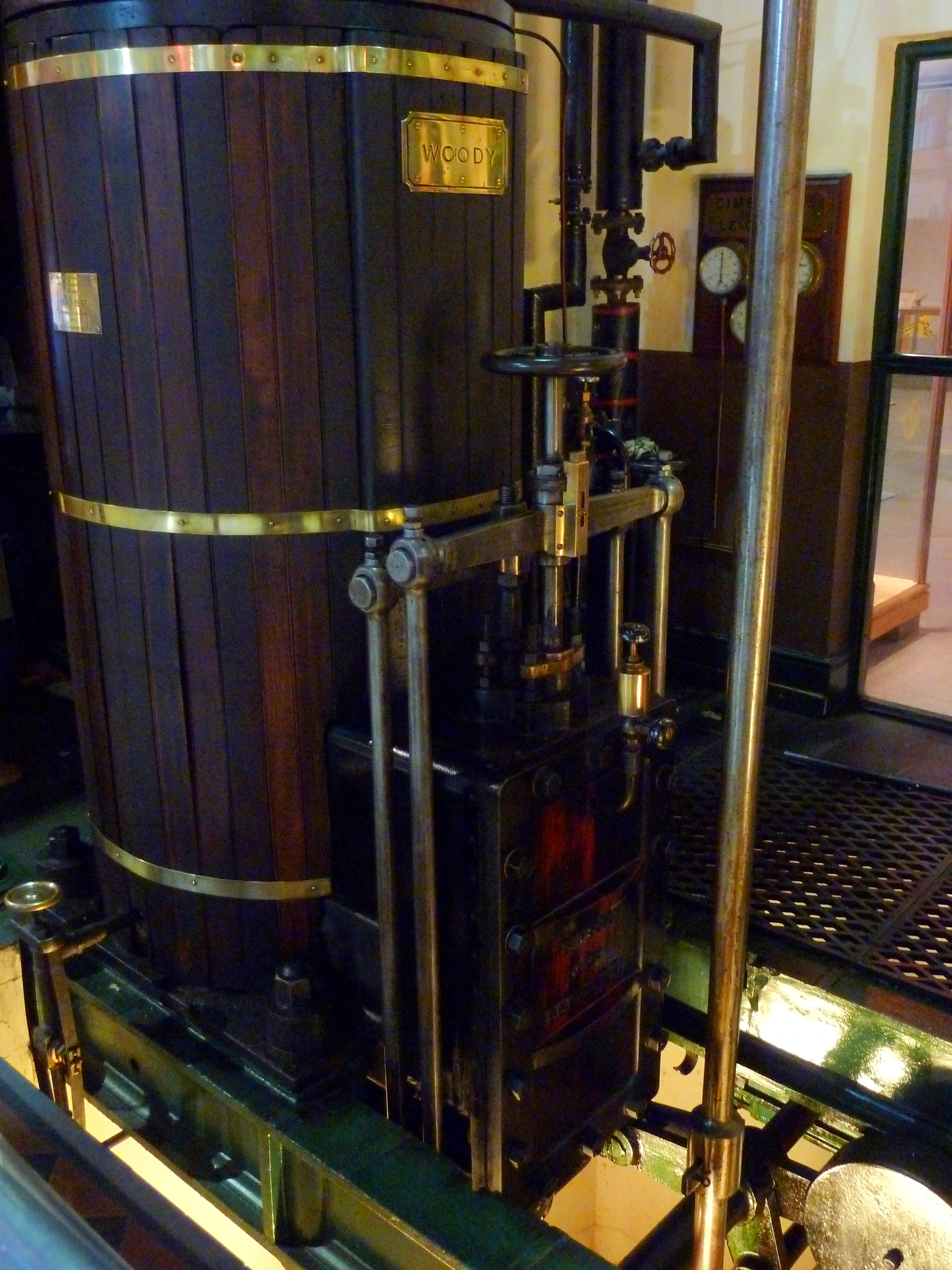
Gimson beam engine, fitted with a Meyer expansion valve

The best-known design of expansion valve was the Meyer, the invention of French engineer Jean-Jacques Meyer (1804-1877) who applied for a patent on 20 October 1841. A similar valve was patented by James Morris. A second slide valve rides on the back of an adapted main slide valve and is driven by an additional eccentric. In the Meyer valve, the effective length of the expansion valve (Note: This length, relative to the port spacing, controls the inlet lap of the valve.) can be altered with a handwheel whilst the engine is running. The valve has two heads mounted on left- and right-handed threads on the handwheel's valve rod, so that rotating the wheel moves the heads either together or apart. In this arrangement the cut-off is normally controlled manually. Although automatic control was attempted, it was too slow-acting to be effective.

Engines on display at Snibston Discovery Museum and Coleham Pumping Station have Meyer expansion valves.

== Compound engines ==
Expansion valves were also fitted to compound steam engines. Both techniques are an attempt to achieve greater efficiency, even at the cost of more complexity.

It was usual for expansion valves to be fitted only to the HP (high-pressure) cylinder. Steam supplied to the following LP (low-pressure) cylinder has already been supplied to the engine, so there is little benefit to conserving it. Any early cut-off of the steam inlet to an LP cylinder may also represent throttling the exhaust of the preceding HP cylinder, and a reduction in the efficiency of that cylinder.

Later compound mill engines with sophisticated valve gears often fitted the complex gear to the HP cylinder whilst retaining a simpler traditional slide valve for the LP cylinder. Examples existed with four different sets of valves: drop valve HP inlets, Corliss HP exhausts and a LP slide valve with a Meyer expansion valve.

== Link valve gears ==
Developments after the separate expansion valve led to more sophisticated valve gears that could achieve the same goal of varying inlet lap with a single valve. The first of these were the link valve gears, particularly the Stephenson link valve gear. This uses a pair of eccentrics with a sliding link mechanism between them that acts as a mechanical adding device. Selecting intermediate positions provides a valve actuation with the effect of increasing cut-off. As such valve gears also provided, and were first developed for, reversing, they were widely used on locomotives. Theoretically, the precise effect is that of reduced valve travel, rather than an earlier cut-off. This has the effect of reducing overall valve opening, reducing initial steam supply and so having the effect of wire-drawing rather than pure expansion. Despite this, the Stephenson gear became one of the two most-widely used gears for locomotives.

== Automatic governors ==
'Automatic' engines, and in turn high-speed engines, operated at increasing speeds and required more precise control of their speed under varying load. This required the coupling of their governor to the expansion valve gear. Earlier engines with Watt's centrifugal governor and throttle valve become inefficient when operating at low power.

The Richardson governor was used for stationary and portable engines produced by his employers, Robey & Co. This is a simple link valve gear controlled automatically by a centrifugal governor. Rather than the Stephenson's manual control of the die-block position within the oscillating link, the Richardson governor adjusts this according to engine speed. It usually operated similarly to a Meyer valve, with two valves driven by two eccentrics and the Richardson governor used instead of the Meyer's manual handwheel. This avoided the wire-drawing problem of the Stephenson's reduced valve travel and improved efficiency for stationary engines that might run at low power for long periods.

== Successor valve types ==
In the fully developed forms of the high-speed engine (from around 1900) though, expansion was controlled by governing the timing (Note: As this was the timing of the valve that was controlled, not its stroke, it avoided some of the Stephenson link's throttling drawback.) of a single valve, rather than a separate expansion valve. These led to further complex valve types such as poppet valves, often driven by cam-based valve gears rather than linkages. (Note: Link and radius valve gears are simple to make but have performance limitations. Arbitrarily-shaped cams can offer valve control tailored closer to an ideal operation, although they were difficult to manufacture accurately and their performance worsened dramatically as they wore. Improvements to machining techniques, metallurgy and lubrication increasingly favoured the cams.)

Increasing use of superheating encouraged the replacement of slide valves with piston valves, as these were easier to lubricate at the increased operating temperatures. They also made it impractical to use secondary valves like the Meyer, running on the backs of the primary valves. Possibly the last new design to use a secondary valve as an expansion valve was the Midland Railway Paget locomotive, that used bronze sleeves as expansion valves around its cast iron rotary valves. This design was unsuccessful, owing to mechanical problems with differential thermal expansion of the two valve materials.
