= Expansion valve =

An expansion valve is a valve used for different purposes:

== Steam engines ==
A valve used to control the expansion of steam:

- Expansion valve (steam engine)
  - The best-known of these was the Meyer expansion valve, the invention of Jean-Jacques Meyer

== Thermodynamics ==
A valve used to expand a gas, for thermodynamic cooling purposes in either:

- Joule-Thomson cooler
- heat pump

Also

- Thermal expansion valve, a component in refrigeration and air conditioning systems
