= LNWR Greater Britain Class =

Class of British steam locomotives

LNWR Greater Britain class
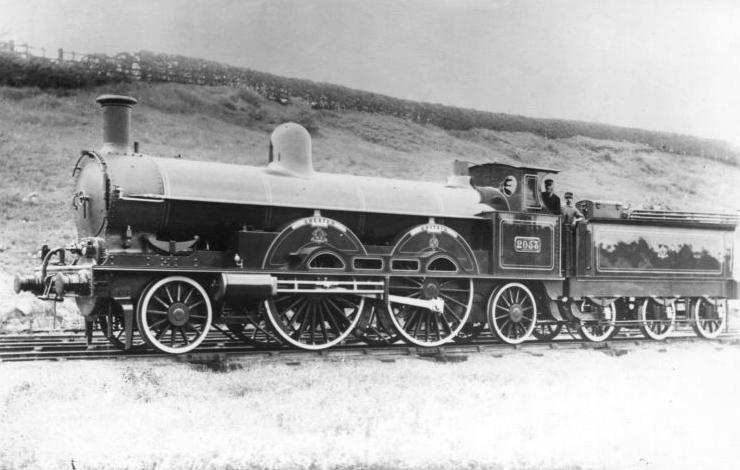
- LNWR No. 2053 Greater Britain
Type and origin
- Power type: Steam
- Designer: F. W. Webb
- Builder: Crewe Works
- Serial number: 3292, 3435, 3472–3479
- Build date: 1892–1894
- Total produced: 10
Specifications
- Configuration
  - Whyte: 2-2-2-2
  - UIC: 1AA1 n3vS
- Gauge: 4 ft 8 1/2 in (1,435 mm)
- Leading dia.: 3 ft 10 1/2 in (1,181 mm), plus 3 in (76 mm) tyres
- Driver dia.: 6 ft 10 in (2.083 m)
- Trailing dia.: 3 ft 10 1/2 in (1,181 mm), plus 3 in (76 mm) tyres
- Wheelbase: 8 ft 5 in (2.565 m) +; 8 ft 3 in (2.515 m) +; 7 ft 3 in (2.210 m)
- Loco weight: 52 long tons (53 t)
- Fuel type: Coal
- Water cap.: 2,000 imp gal (9,100 L; 2,400 US gal)
- Boiler
  - Diameter: 4 ft 3 in (1.295 m)
  - Tube plates: 18 ft 6 in (5.639 m)
- Heating surface: 1,505.7 sq ft (139.88 m^{2})
- Cylinders: Three, compound: two outside high pressure for trailing drivers, one inside low pressure for leading drivers
- High-pressure cylinder: 15 in × 24 in (381 mm × 610 mm)
- Low-pressure cylinder: 30 in × 24 in (762 mm × 610 mm)
- Valve gear: Stephenson, Slip-eccentric.
Career
- Operators: London and North Western Railway
- Scrapped: March 1906 – July 1907
- Disposition: All scrapped

The London and North Western Railway (LNWR) Greater Britain class was a class of ten 2-2-2-2 steam locomotives designed for express passenger work by F. W. Webb.

== History ==
The first of the ten locomotives was built in October 1891, and a second followed in May 1893; the remaining eight came from Crewe Works in April and May 1894.

They were three-cylinder compound locomotives: the two outside high pressure cylinders drove the trailing drivers via Howe-Stephenson valve gear, the one inside low pressure cylinder drive the leading drivers via a slip eccentric. There was no connection between the two sets of drivers.

All the locomotives were named; one unusual feature (shared with the John Hick class) was that the names were split over two nameplates, one on each driving wheel splasher. This necessitated the use of two-word names, rather than some of the abbreviated names the LNWR had previously used.

They continued in service until Webb's retirement. His successor, George Whale preferred simple superheated locomotives; consequently they were all scrapped between 1906 and 1907.

== Fleet list ==
Table of locomotives
LNWR No.	Name	Crewe Works No.	Date built	Date scrapped	Notes
2525	Greater Britain	3292	Oct 1891	Jul 1907	Renumbered 2053 in Dec 1891
3435	Queen Empress	3435	May 1893	Jun 1906	Renumbered 2054 in Jan 1894
2051	George Findlay	3472	Apr 1894	Jul 1907	
2052	Prince George	3473	May 1894	Sep 1906	
525	Princess May	3474	May 1894	Sep 1906	
526	Scottish Chief	3475	May 1894	Mar 1906	
527	Henry Bessemer	3476	May 1894	Jan 1907	
528	Richard Moon	3477	May 1894	Mar 1906	
529	William Cawkwell	3478	May 1894	Sep 1906	
772	Richard Trevithick	3479	May 1894	Apr 1906	
