= Cutoff (steam engine) =

Event in a steam engine

In a steam engine, cutoff is the point in the piston stroke at which the inlet valve is closed. On a steam locomotive, the cutoff is controlled by the reversing gear.

The point at which the inlet valve closes and stops the entry of steam into the cylinder from the boiler plays a crucial role in the control of a steam engine. Once the valve has closed, steam trapped in the cylinder expands adiabatically. The steam pressure drops as it expands. A late cutoff delivers full steam pressure to move the piston through its entire stroke, for maximum start-up forces. But, since there will still be unexploited pressure in the cylinder at the end of the stroke, this is achieved at the expense of engine efficiency. In this situation the steam will still have considerable pressure remaining when it is exhausted resulting in the characteristic “chuff chuff” sound of a steam engine. An early cutoff has greater thermodynamic efficiency but results in a lower mean effective pressure so less average force on the piston and is used for running the engine at higher speeds.

== Explanation ==
Schematic indicator diagram of pressure in a steam locomotive cylinder. The pressure in the cylinder declines after cutoff as the steam pushes the piston down its bore.

Cutoff is one of the four valve events. Early cutoff is used to increase the efficiency of the engine by allowing the steam to expand for the rest of the power stroke, yielding more of its energy and conserving steam. This is known as expansive working. Late cutoff is used to provide maximum torque to the shaft at the expense of efficiency and is used to start the engine under load.

Cutoff is conventionally expressed as percentage of the power stroke of the piston; if the piston is at a quarter of its stroke at the cutoff point, the cutoff is stated as 25%.

Smaller stationary steam engines generally have a fixed cutoff point while, in large ones, the speed and power output is generally governed by altering the cutoff, frequently under governor control using an expansion valve or trip gear. In steam engines for transport, it is desirable to be able to alter the cutoff over a wide range. In steam locomotives, for starting and at low speed and heavy load, the cylinders need moderate steam supply (by throttling the steam supply pressure) throughout most of the piston stroke. The lower pressure is used to avoid "wheel spin" that frequently occurs when starting a train onto motion. After establishing train moderate speed, the cutoff is reduced, and higher boiler pressure is admitted into the cylinders, which results in much better engine efficiency. In a two-cylinder locomotive, for example, the maximum or 'full gear' cutoff is typically about 85%. At high speeds, the cutoff may be significantly reduced. Steam engines used in boats and ships typically also use variable cutoff valve gear, while some operate with a fixed cutoff, with speed being controlled through the regulator.

Providing variable cutoff is an important function of the valve gear.

== See also ==
- Expansion valve
- Old Bess (beam engine) – the first steam engine to use an early cutoff
