= Distillerie Dillon =

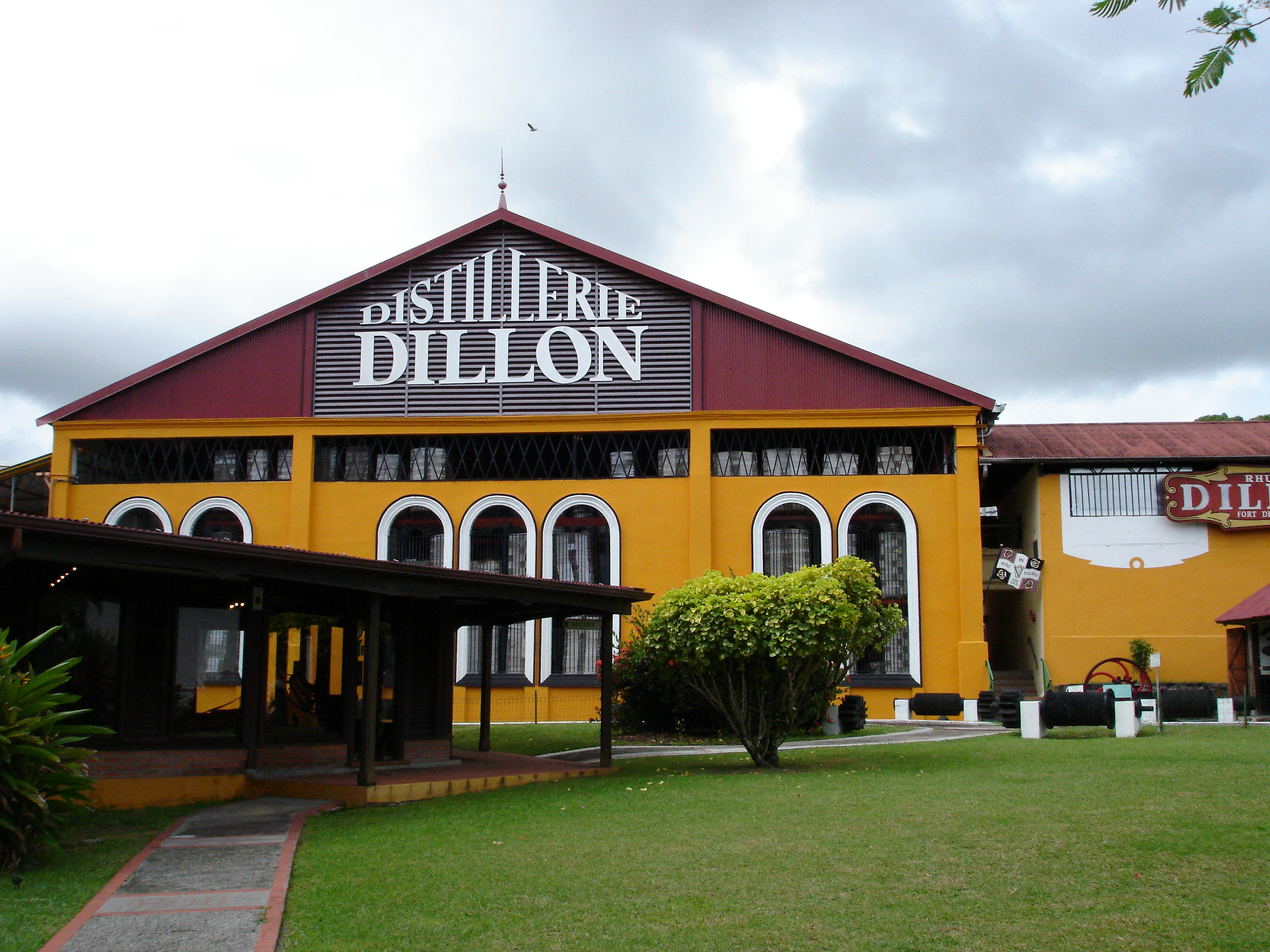
- The Distillerie Dillon
- Industry: Rum
- Products: Rhum Dillon
- Website: Official website

The Distillerie Dillon is in Fort de France in Martinique. It distills many types of rum from the locally grown sugar cane. It is powered by a Corliss steam engine that was built in 1922.

== History ==
The site of the distillery was settled by sugar farmers in 1690. The name stems from Arthur Dillon (1750–1794), a soldier with Lafayette's troops in the American War of Independence. Serving with Dillon's Regiment, of the Irish Brigade (France), he had been created a colonel at the age of 16.

On returning to his home from the war, he married a rich widow, named Louise. Then they bought the estate, flourishing with sugar cane, and had a daughter Fanny. Dillon became a deputy, and his daughter was presented by her cousin Josephine to Napoleon. She married General Bertrand, and they both accompanied Napoleon into exile on Elba and St Helena. On returning to the Dillon Plantation, she campaigned against slavery.

== Process ==
There are ten varieties of sugar cane used by Dillon. The cane is grown for two years and when harvested the sugar is extracted over a period of 2 to 3 days. Speed is essential. The saying goes "the cane should have its feet in the earth and its head in the mill". The cane is crushed three times by a steam engine driven mill to release the juice. Water is added and the juice is allowed to ferment. It is again milled to crush the sugar, and fermentation starts. The residue cane is used to fire the boilers that provide the steam. The distillation is a slow process, in columns heated to 65 °C (149 °F), producing an alcohol of 65%. It rests for five months then is reduced and bottled at 50% to 55%.

== See also ==
- List of French rums
- List of rum producers
