= 2-2-2-2 =

Locomotive wheel arrangement

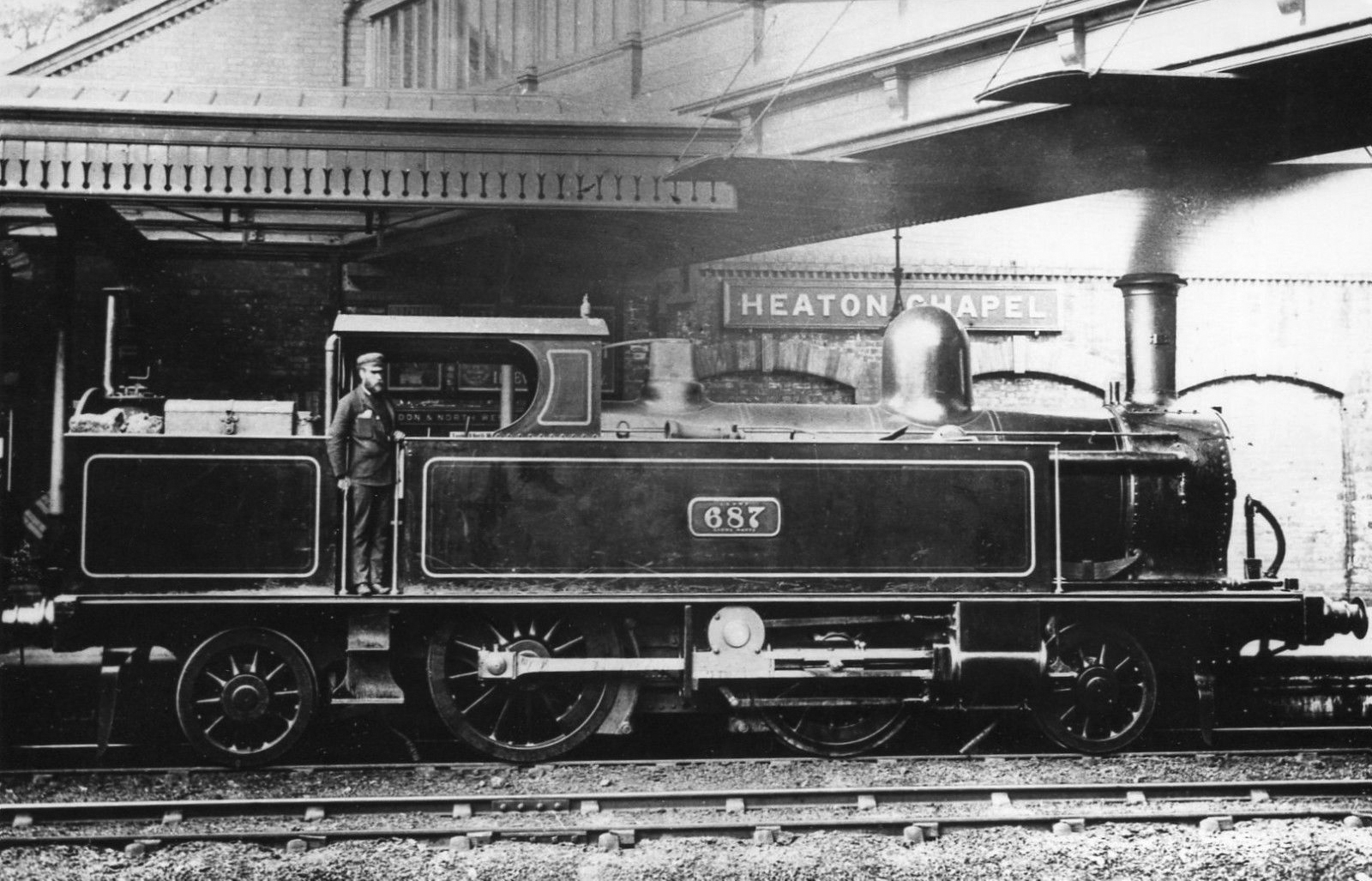
No. 687, LNWR 2-2-2-2T

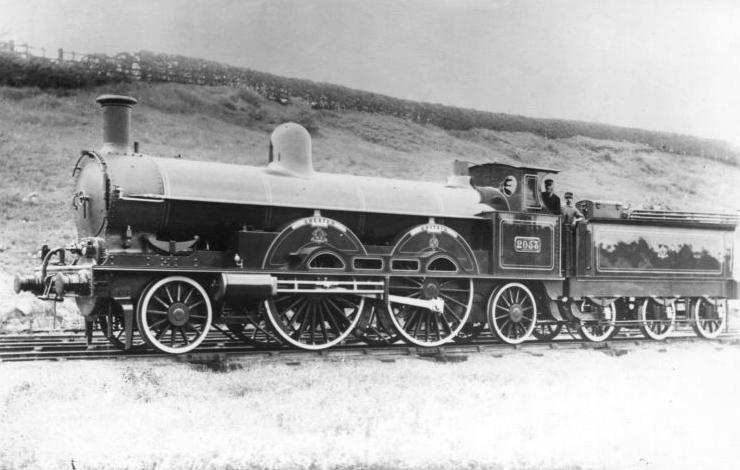
LNWR Greater Britain Class, engine No. 2053 Greater Britain

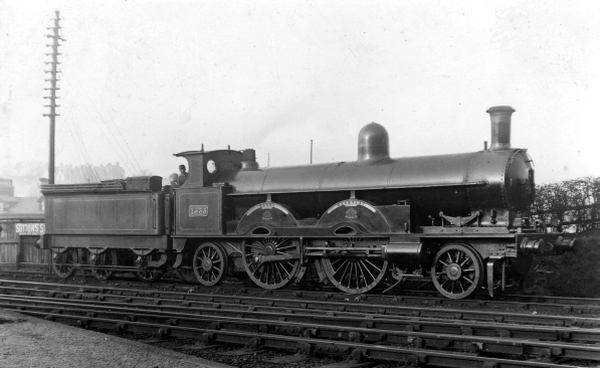
LNWR John Hick Class, engine No. 1535 Henry Maudslay

Under the Whyte notation for the classification of steam locomotives, 2-2-2-2 could represent either the wheel arrangement of two leading wheels, four powered but uncoupled driving wheels, and two trailing wheels; or of two independent leading axles (not in a bogie), two driving wheels, and two trailing wheels.

== Usage ==
The (2-2)-2-2 wheel arrangement, or (2-2) -2-2, was first used on five locomotives introduced on the Eastern Counties Railway by John Chester Craven in 1846/7.

The 2-(2-2)-2 version was used by Francis Webb of the London and North Western Railway between 1885 and 1887 on two unique divided drive compound tank locomotives, No. 687 (1885) and No. 600 (1887). He then produced two tender engine classes each of ten locomotives: the LNWR Greater Britain Class (1892–1894) and the LNWR John Hick Class (1894–1898). The locomotives were never reliable and Webb's successor George Whale withdrew them all within three years of taking up office in 1903.

== See also ==
- John Hick (politician)
