= LNWR John Hick Class =

LNWR John Hick class
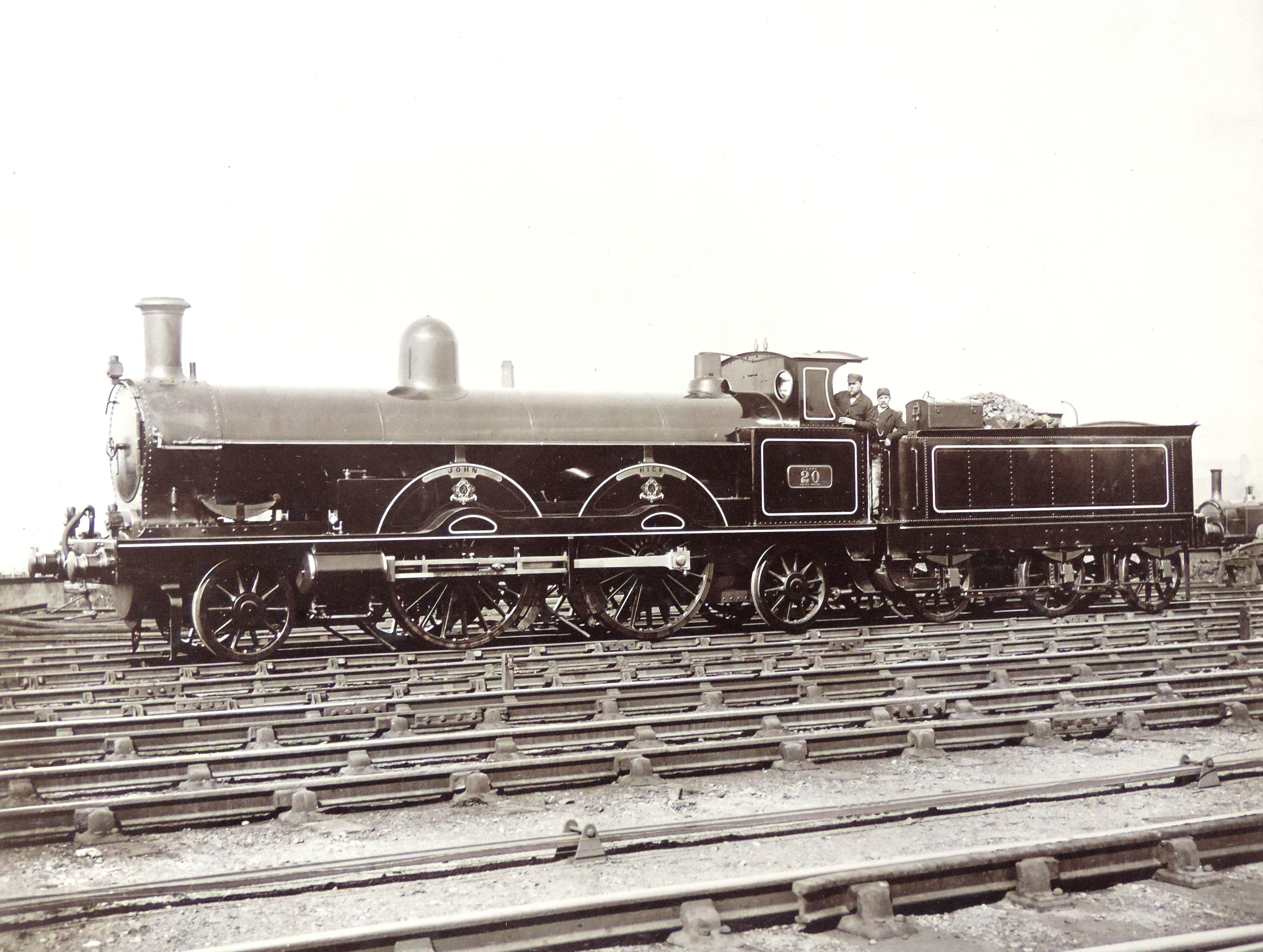
- LNWR No. 20 John Hick
Type and origin
- Power type: Steam
- Designer: F. W. Webb
- Builder: Crewe Works
- Serial number: 3505, 3858–3866
- Build date: 1894–1898
- Total produced: 10
Specifications
- Configuration
  - Whyte: 2-2-2-2
  - UIC: 1AA1 n3v
- Gauge: 4 ft 8 1/2 in (1,435 mm)
- Leading dia.: 3 ft 6 in (1,067 mm), plus 3 in (76 mm) tyres
- Driver dia.: 6 ft 0 in (1.829 m)
- Trailing dia.: 3 ft 6 in (1,067 mm), plus 3 in (76 mm) tyres
- Wheelbase: 8 ft 5 in (2.565 m) +; 8 ft 3 in (2.515 m) +; 7 ft 3 in (2.210 m)
- Loco weight: 52 long tons (53 t)
- Fuel type: Coal
- Water cap.: 2,000 imp gal (9,100 L; 2,400 US gal)
- Boiler
  - Pitch: 7 ft 8 1/4 in (2.343 m)
  - Diameter: 4 ft 3 in (1.295 m)
  - Tube plates: 18 ft 6 in (5.639 m)
- Heating surface: 1,505.7 sq ft (139.88 m^{2})
- Cylinders: Three, compound: two outside high pressure for trailing drivers, one inside low pressure for leading drivers
- High-pressure cylinder: 15 in × 24 in (381 mm × 610 mm)
- Low-pressure cylinder: 30 in × 24 in (762 mm × 610 mm)
- Valve gear: Stephenson, Slip-eccentric.
Career
- Operators: London and North Western Railway
- Scrapped: October 1907 – May 1912
- Disposition: All scrapped

The London and North Western Railway (LNWR) John Hick class was a class of ten 2-2-2-2 steam locomotives designed for express passenger work by F. W. Webb.

== History ==
They were broadly similar to the earlier Greater Britain class, the principal difference being smaller driving wheels, as their intended use was on the more-steeply graded Northern Section.

The first of the ten locomotives was built in February 1894, and the remaining nine came from Crewe Works between January and April 1898.

They were three-cylinder compound locomotives: the two outside high-pressure cylinders drove the trailing drivers via Howe-Stephenson valve gear, the one inside low-pressure cylinder drive the leading drivers via a slip eccentric. There was no connection between the two sets of drivers.

All the locomotives were named; one unusual feature (shared with the Greater Britain class) was that the names were split over two nameplates, one on each driving wheel splasher. This necessitated the use of two-word names, rather than some of the abbreviated names the LNWR had previously used. The names chosen continued the Greater Britain theme.

They continued in service until Webb's retirement. His successor, George Whale, preferred simple superheated locomotives; consequently they were all scrapped between 1907 and 1912.

== Fleet list ==
Table of locomotives
LNWR No.	Name	Crewe Works No.	Date built	Date scrapped	Notes
20	John Hick	3505	Feb 1894	Apr 1910	
1505	Richard Arkwright	3858	Jan 1898	May 1912	
1512	Henry Cort	3859	Feb 1898	Oct 1907	
1534	William Froude	3860	Feb 1898	Dec 1909	
1535	Henry Maudsley	3861	Feb 1898	Aug 1910	Name misspelt
1536	Hugh Myddleton	3862	Mar 1898	Feb 1909	
1548	John Penn	3863	Mar 1898	Mar 1909	
1549	John Rennie	3864	Mar 1898	Aug 1909	
1557	Thomas Savery	3865	Mar 1898	Mar 1909	
1559	William Siemens	3866	Apr 1898	Oct 1910	

== See also ==
- LNWR Whale Experiment Class
- LNWR George the Fifth Class
