= Western Museum of Mining & Industry =

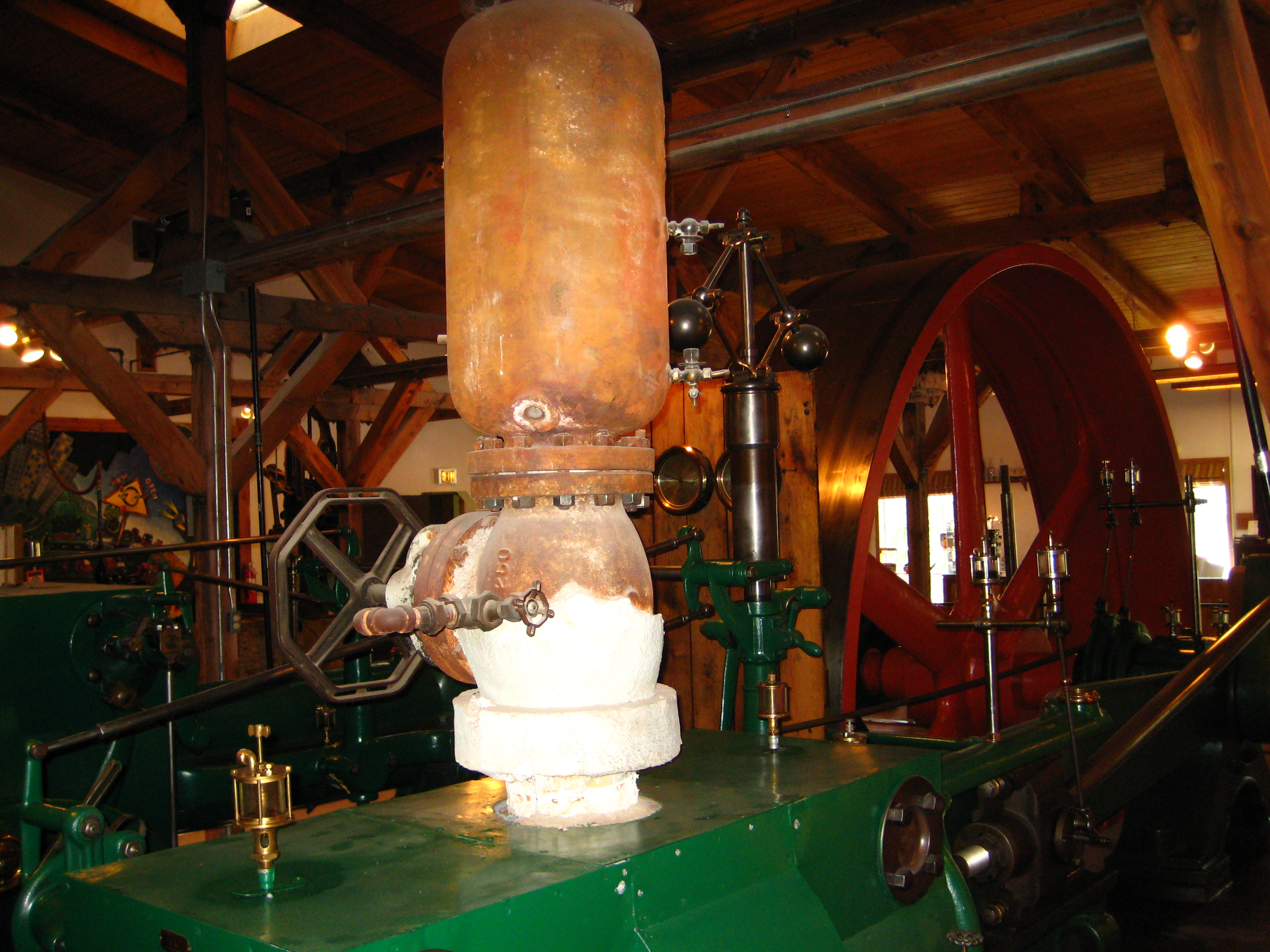
- 500 hp Corliss steam engine, on display in the museum
- Established: 1970
- Location: 225 North Gate Boulevard; Colorado Springs, Colorado
- Coordinates: 39°01′38″N 104°49′45″W
- Type: Mining museum
- Website: www.wmmi.org

Western Museum of Mining & Industry (WMMI) is a museum dedicated to the mining history and industrial technology of the western United States and the country’s history in general. Located at 225 North Gate Boulevard in Colorado Springs, Colorado, the museum is composed of a 27 acre track of land with indoor and outdoor exhibits on display throughout. Visitation to the museum is open from 9:00 am to 4:00 pm, from Mondays through Saturdays.

== History ==
Founded in 1970 as the “Museum of the West,” the museum would initially build on the large private collection of Frederick M. Fararr of Colorado Springs. This collection originally consisted of tools, machinery, and electrical apparatus which were assembled over the course of a fifteen-year period. Within a period of six years, the museum received a variety of other donations from other institutions such as the New York Technological Society and Smithsonian Institution.

In 1973, the Museum of the West made the decision to formally change its name to the “Western Museum of Mining and Industry” to better convey the museum’s message and purpose. Construction of a permanent exhibit building was originally slated for June 1976. An initial fund of an excess of $900,000 in endowment grants laid out long-term funding for the project. Further funds were additionally committed by Fredrick M. Farrar and general donations. Despite these funds, actual construction of the exhibit building did not begin until July 1979.

Another building began construction in the meantime in late November of 1977. This building was modeled after ore stamp mills commonly constructed during the 1890s. Over the course of three years, the stamp mill was built and furbished properly. Upon its opening on June 25th, 1980, WMMI christened the building as the “Yellow Jacket II” after the much older Yellow Jacket amalgamation mill in Montezuma, Colorado. Within the mill a jaw crusher, 10 stamp mill, amalgamating tables, and concentrating tables, along with a slew of other machinery dealing with power, geology, and mining were exhibited.

Soon after the opening of the Yellow Jacket II, the construction of the permanent museum building was completed in late March of 1982. Installation of the exhibits soon followed in April of that year. On July 29th, 1982, the permanent museum building was formally opened to the public by museum chairman Fredrick M. Farrar and director Peter Molloy with over five hundred guests present

== Activities and Exhibits ==
The Western Museum of Mining and Industry (WMMI) has a wide variety of machinery and other apparatuses on display throughout the premises. Each exhibit varies in size and significance. Some of the most notable exhibits and items, however, are:

- Corliss Steam Engine: A Corliss Steam Engine can produce 1,400 horsepower and typically stands between 20 to 40 feet tall. WMMI’s Corliss engine is located in the front lobby of the museum building and was installed throughout the construction of the building itself. Before its purchase in 1972 by WMMI, the machine was used as the primary power source for the Hollingsworth & Vose Company’s paper manufacturing plant located in West Groton, Massachusetts.
- Downie Steam Pump: Downie steam pumps were used to extract water that seeped and collected into lower sections of mines. The pump held in display at WMMI was manufactured around 1900 by Keystone Driller Company in Beaver Falls, PA. After having been manufactured, the pump was utilized and held at the Wolverine Copper Mine near Waldon, CO.
- Fluorescent Minerals: Many minerals have the ability to appear significantly different under different wavelengths of light, particularly ultraviolet light. The term for this phenomenon is Fluorescence. This ability causes the mineral to appear in drastically and often extremely luminous and vibrant colors than it appears in sunlight. A collection of these kinds of minerals is displayed in a unique exhibit fitted with UV lights.
- “Iron Donkey” Air Trammers: Named after the donkeys that once hauled ore cars out of mines, the “Iron Donkey” air trammers fulfilled the same role. One such “Iron Donkey” is displayed at WMMI with a visual exhibit to see the machine in operation.
- “Yellow Jacket II” Stamp Mill: Stamp mills were invented during the 16th century as way to crush ore-bearing rock and separate valuable metals from less desirable material. Originally in Montezuma, Colorado, the Yellow Jacket stamp mill operated in the local mining district into the 1940s. WMMI purchased the contents of the old mill in 1970 and erected a replica building to house the two 5-stamp batteries and amalgamation tables. The replica was dubbed the “Yellow Jacket II” and is now one of only five such mill buildings in the United States that are fully operational. Visitors at the museum witness the Yellow Jacket II in operation during major museum events.

== Gallery ==
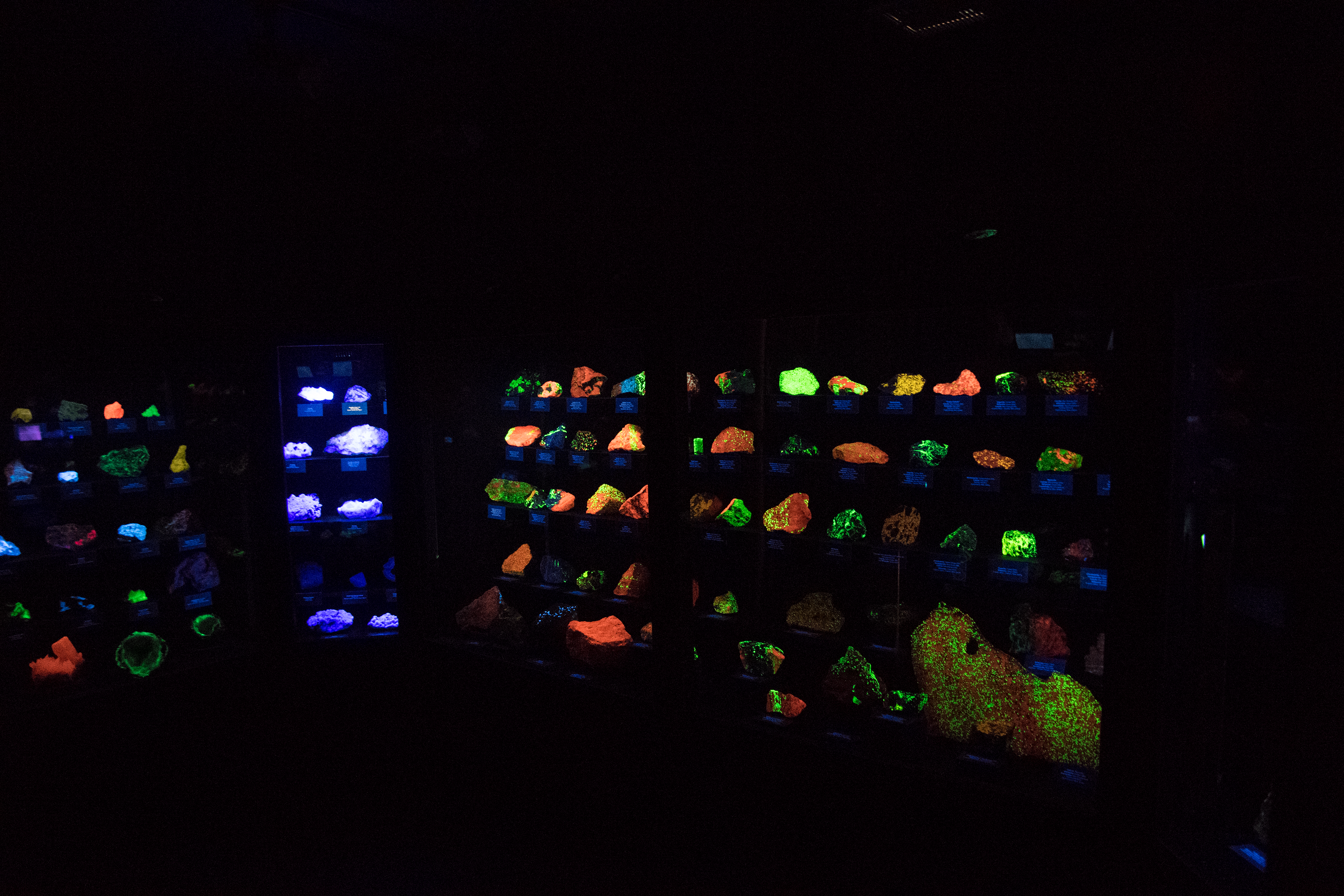
Fluorescent Minerals exhibit.

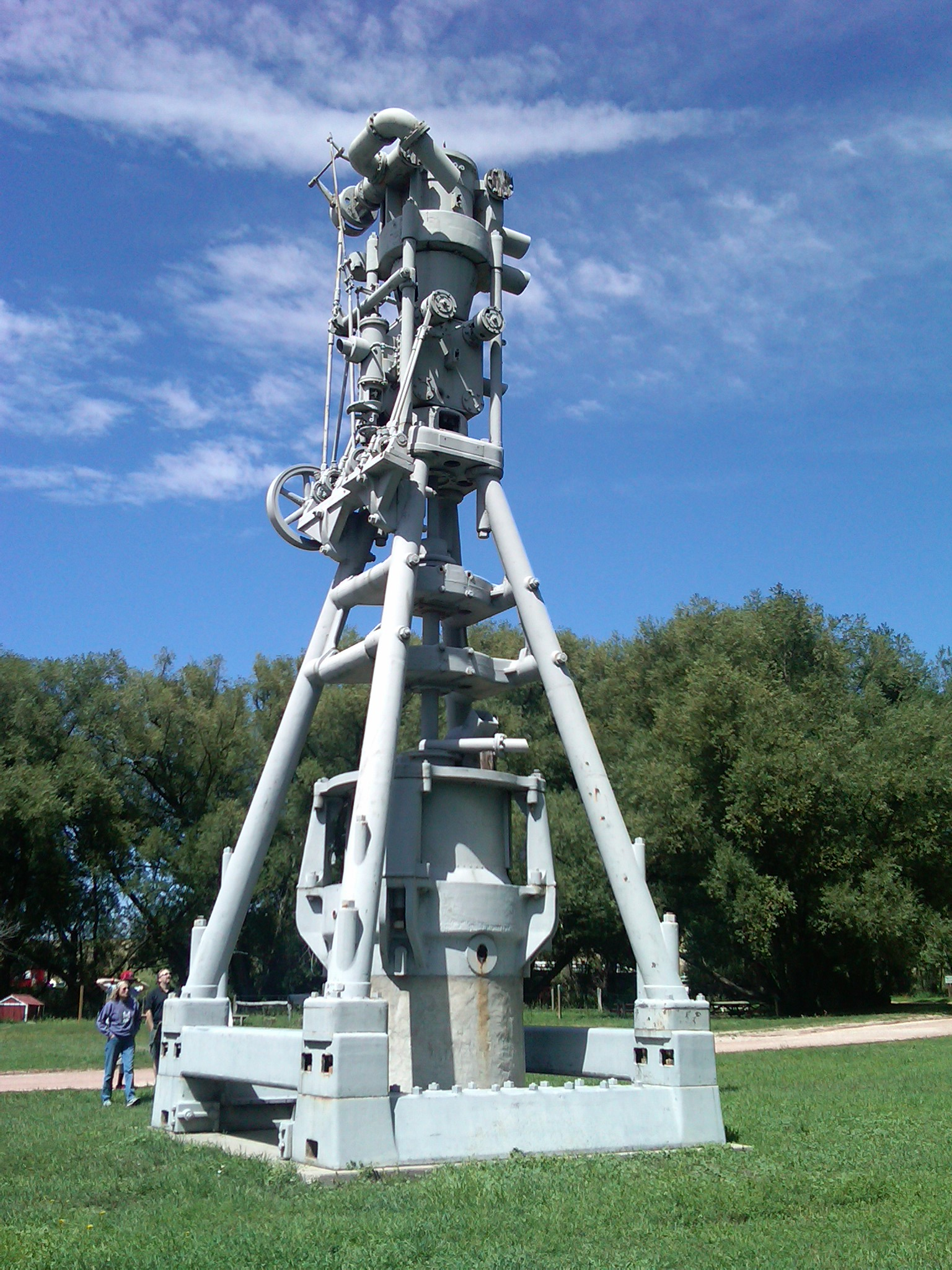
40-foot tall steam stamp engine, used in the Michigan copper district circa 1900.
