= William Wright (engineer) =

American engineer

William Wright was an American engineer who contributed to the development of the Corliss steam engine in the mid 19th century.

Wright also developed several innovative improvements in steam engine design such as the automatic shutoff steam engine which employed a governor to limit the engine's speed. He also developed and may have built some designs that have not survived the test of time such as the "Annular Steam Engine" also known as the "Oscillating Steam Engine". He owned a series of steam engine manufacturing plants in and around New York City, the largest being "The Wright Steam Engine Works" in Newburgh, NY. He built engines that powered the pumps of the Brooklyn Water Works. During the American Civil War he built engines that powered warships of the North.

After bankruptcy in the early 1890s, Wright failed to raise the $10,000 needed to satisfy his creditors and keep his engine works. The buildings of Wright's Engine Works, in the northern waterfront area of Newburgh known as Sherman Dock, still survive today as warehouses.
