= Rhum Clément =

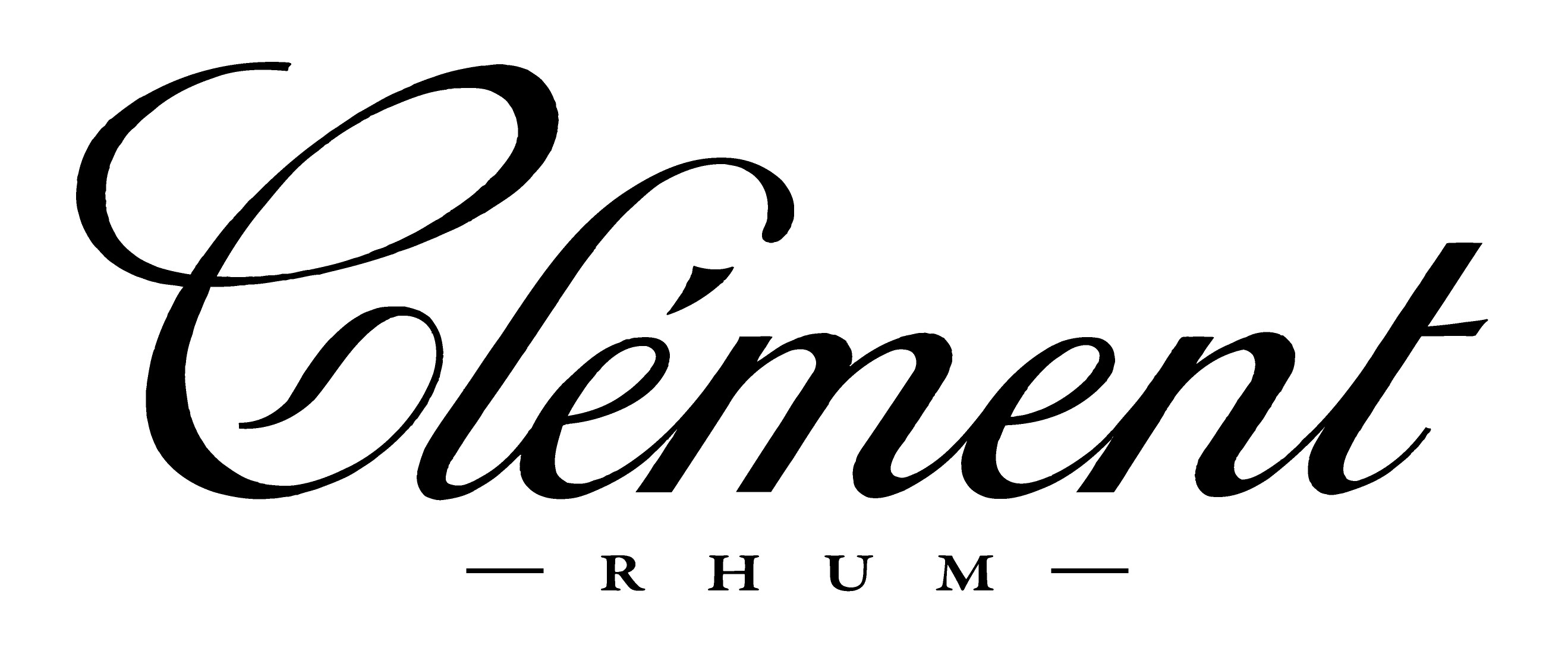

Rhum Clément is a brand of Rhum agricole produced in Martinique. It was founded in 1887.
