= Joseph H. Hoadley =

American financier

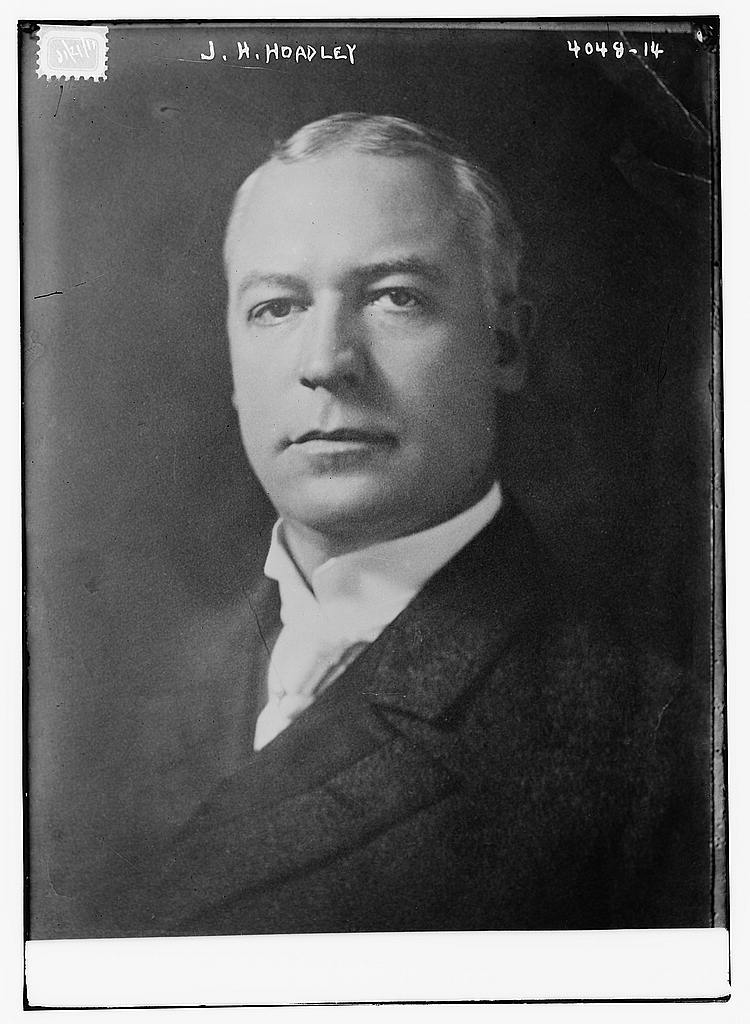
Hoadley in 1905

Joseph H. Hoadley (July 1863 – ?) was an American financier charged with fraud on several occasions. He was president of International Power Co.

== Biography ==
He was born in San Francisco, California in July 1863, to a family of New England descent with connections to mechanical engineering inventions He began his career in 15 as an apprentice in Union Brass & Iron Works machine shop, but before completing his apprenticeship he moved on to Pacific steam liner SS City of Tokio and worked his way over to one of her engineers.

After returning to complete his apprenticeship, Hoadley worked briefly as a locomotive engineer on the Southern Pacific. By age 21, he had become superintendent of the Calico mines in Southern California. He then established himself as a contractor for mining machinery, installing plants across several western states including California, Idaho, Washington, Montana, Oregon, and Alaska. Hoadley expanded his business to include contracts for power-house plants, street railroads, electric-lighting plants, and various industrial facilities, and by 1894 he had moved his headquarters to Chicago, linking his western operations with new ventures in the Midwest.

In 1902 he headed American Ordnance Company based in Bridgeport which manufactured Driggs-Schroeder and Hotchkiss naval guns and negotiated the acquisition of competing Driggs-Seabury. By 1906 he was a defendant before the New York Supreme Court in a trial with Elizabeth C. Prall.

In 1916 he was sentenced to Ludlow Street Jail, when the police came to detain him at his house, and suspect that he escaped through a secret tunnel.

In 1918 he lost a lawsuit and was ordered to pay $999,389 to the American & British Mfg. Co.

His wife died by suicide in 1919 by inhaling illuminating gas. The police investigated her death as a possible murder. He was then ordered out of his house for non payment of his mortgage. The house was sold, and he claimed to the court that he had an arrangement with the new owner where he was not required to pay rent.

In 1932 he was arrested and convicted of check fraud for $1,037, and sentenced to three months in a workhouse.
