= Negrita (rum) =

French rum brand

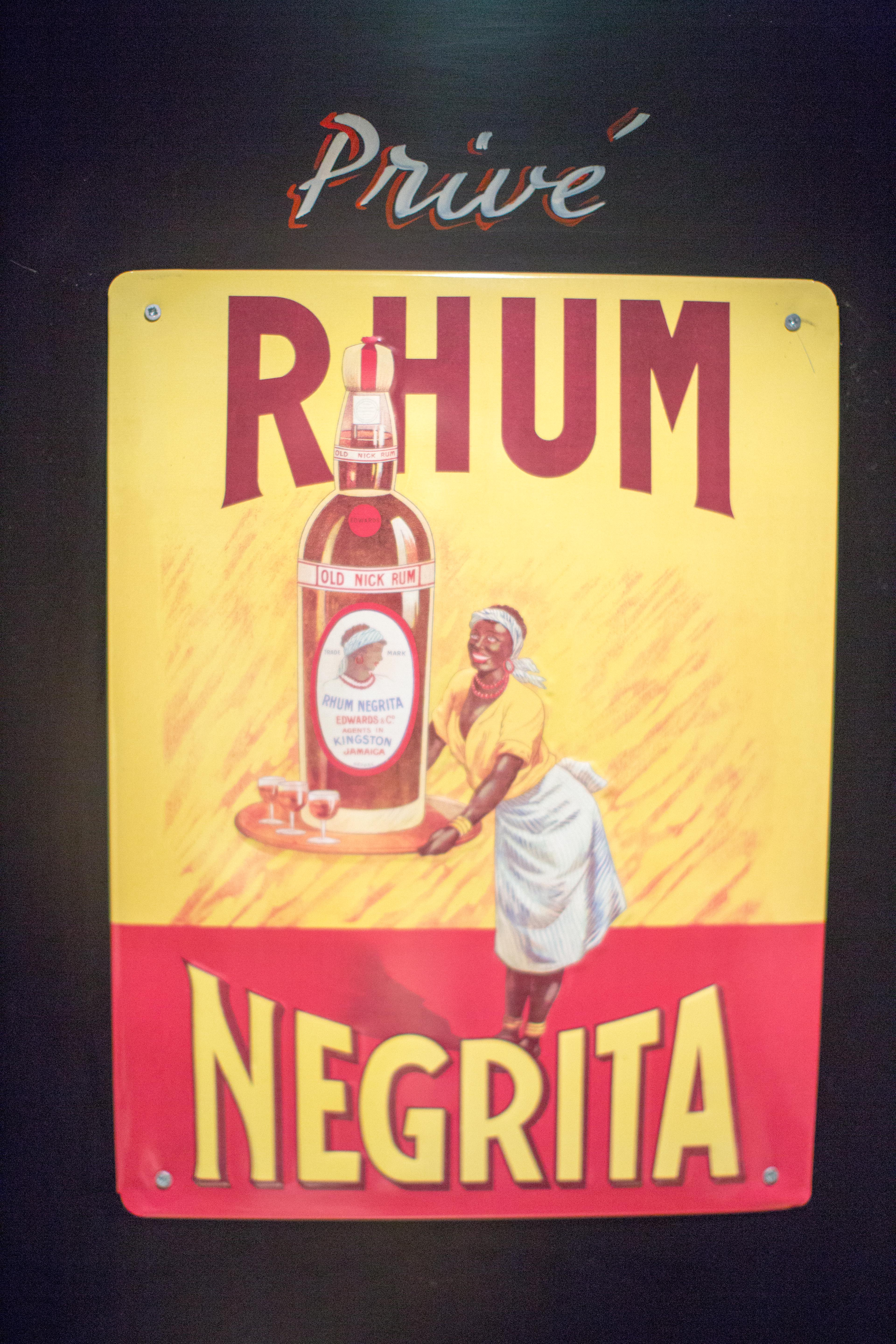
- Distributor: La Martiniquaise
- Origin: Caribbean (French islands); Martinique and Guadeloupe
- Introduced: 1800s

Negrita (sometimes referred to as Negrita Rum or Rhum Negrita) is a French rum brand. It has origins back to the mid-1800s and is currently owned by French spirit company La Martiniquaise.

== History ==
Negrita was first blended and labeled by the Bardinet Company of France in the mid-1800s. It was founded by Paul Bardinet who was a young producer of liqueurs in the French commune of Limoges. He experimented with different blends of tafia to create the new rum. The brand was advertised through billboards with the slogan "el ron de la Negrita" (en. "the rum of the little black girl") with a picture of a Caribbean girl wearing Madras ribbons in her hair. The image became the symbol of the brand and the name was trademarked in 1886.

Bardinet's son, Edouard Bardinet, moved the operations to Bordeaux in 1895. He added whiskey and brandies to the company portfolio, with Negrita staying as the symbol of the Bardinet Company.

In 1993, the company became part of La Martiniquaise.

By 1994, Negrita was the flagship brand of dark rum, accounting for 41% of grocery sales in Europe.

== Production ==
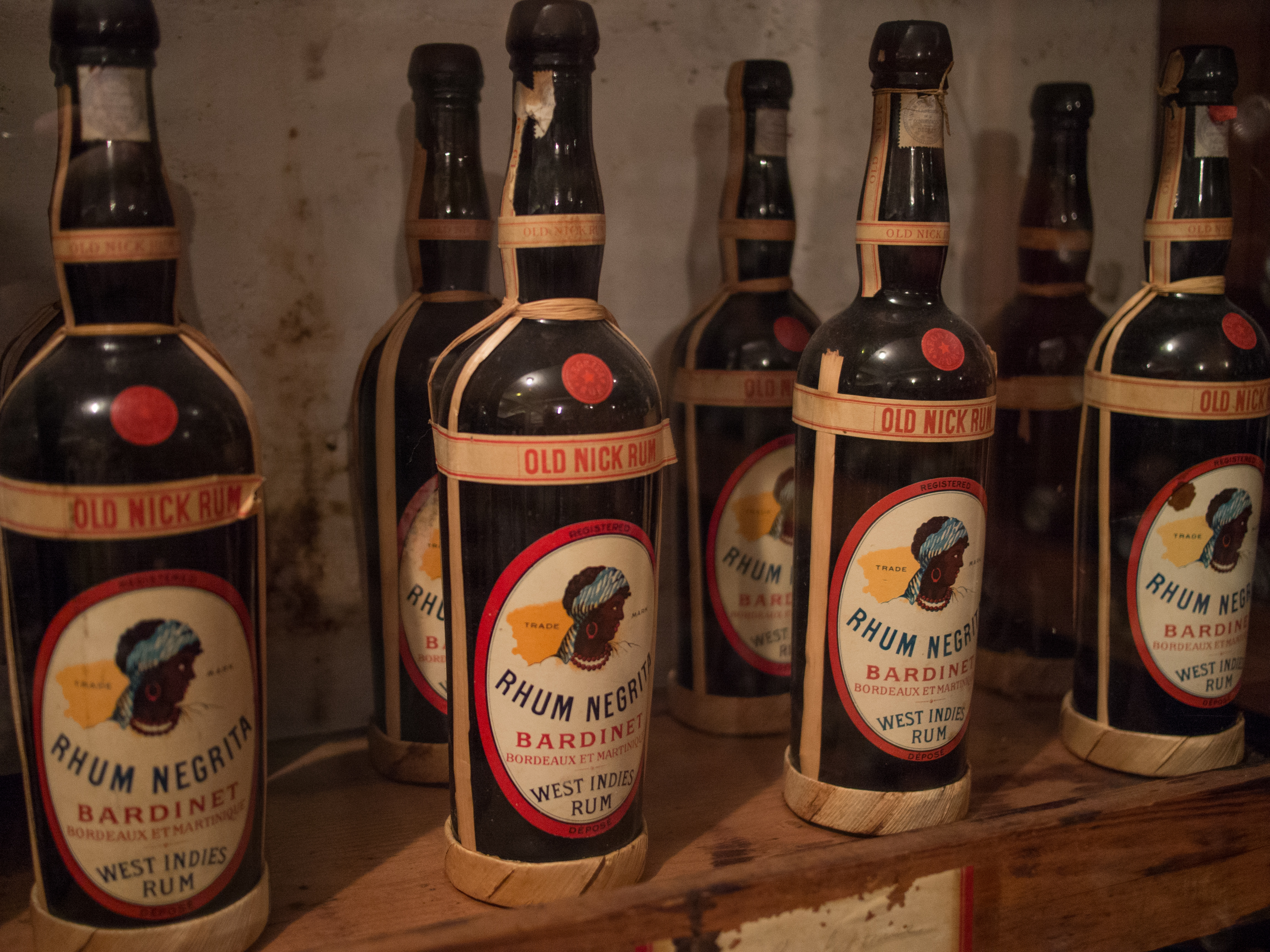
Bottles of Negrita Rum from 2013.

Negrita is a blended rum which is distilled on the French islands of Réunion, Guadeloupe, and Martinique. It is made from a blend of mollasses rhums and rhum agricoles (pure sugar cane rhums).

== See also ==
- List of French rums
- List of rum producers
