= Valve gear =

Mechanism for controlling steam flow in a reciprocating steam engine

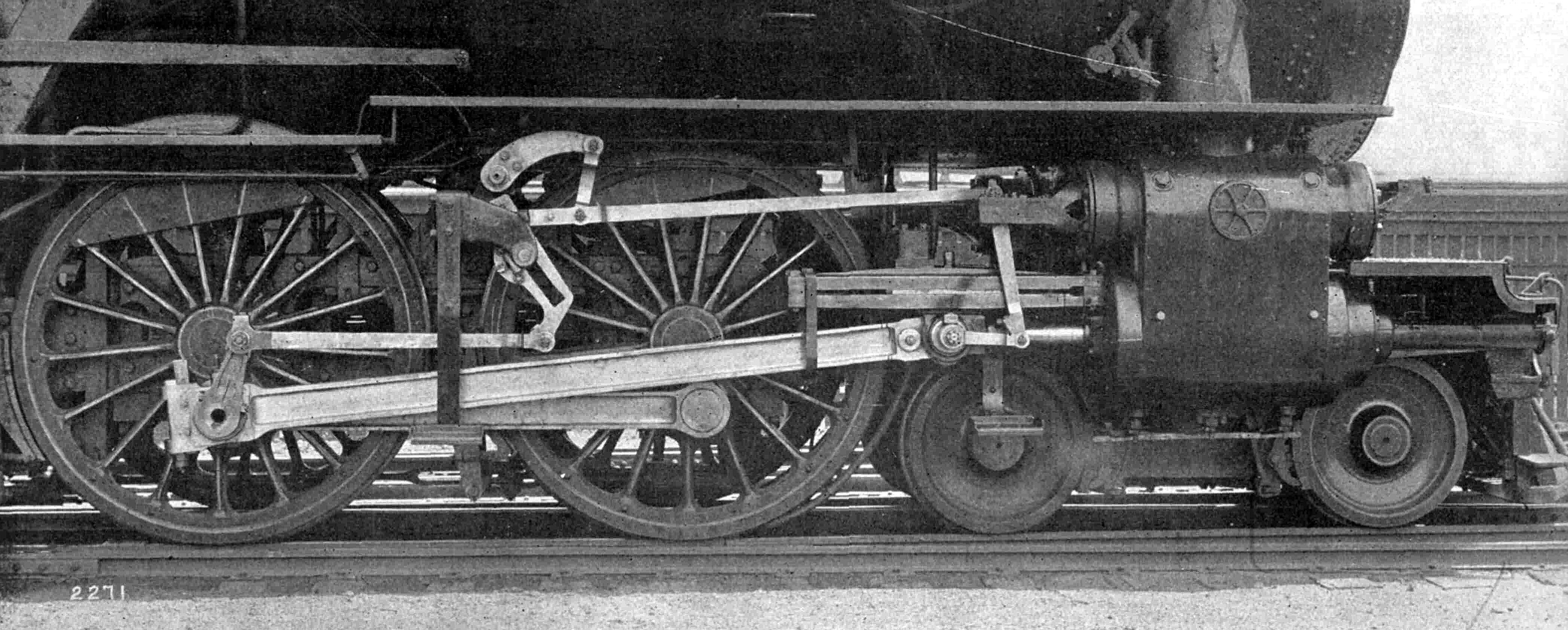
The Walschaerts valve gear on a steam locomotive (a PRR E6s).

The valve gear of a steam engine is the mechanism that operates the inlet and exhaust valves to admit steam into the cylinder and allow exhaust steam to escape, respectively, at the correct points in the cycle. It can also serve as a reversing gear. It is sometimes referred to as the "motion".

== Purpose ==
In the simple case, this can be a relatively simple task as in the internal combustion engine in which the valves always open and close at the same points. This is not the ideal arrangement for a steam engine, though, because greatest power is achieved by keeping the inlet valve open throughout the power stroke (thus having full boiler pressure, minus transmission losses, against the piston throughout the stroke) while peak efficiency is achieved by only having the inlet valve open for a short time and then letting the steam expand in the cylinder (expansive working).

The point at which steam stops being admitted to the cylinder is known as the cutoff, and the optimal position for this varies depending on the work being done and the tradeoff desired between power and efficiency. Steam engines are fitted with regulators (throttles in US parlance) to vary the restriction on steam flow, but controlling the power via the cutoff setting is generally preferable since it makes for more efficient use of boiler steam.

A further benefit may be obtained by admitting the steam to the cylinder slightly before front or back dead centre. This advanced admission (also known as lead steam) assists in cushioning the inertia of the motion at high speed.

In the internal combustion engine, this task is performed by cams on a camshaft driving poppet valves, but this arrangement is not commonly used with steam engines, partly because achieving variable engine timing using cams is complicated. Instead, a system of eccentrics, cranks and levers is generally used to control a D slide valve or piston valve from the motion. Generally, two simple harmonic motions with different fixed phase angles are added in varying proportions to provide an output motion that is variable in phase and amplitude. A variety of such mechanisms have been devised over the years, with varying success.

Both slide and piston valves have the limitation that intake and exhaust events are fixed in relation to each other and cannot be independently optimised. Lap is provided on steam edges of the valve, so that although the valve stroke reduces as cutoff is advanced, the valve is always fully opened to exhaust. However, as cutoff is shortened, the exhaust events also advance. The exhaust release point occurs earlier in the power stroke and compression earlier in the exhaust stroke. Early release wastes some energy in the steam, and early closure also wastes energy in compressing an otherwise unnecessarily large quantity of steam. Another effect of early cutoff is that the valve is moving quite slowly at the cutoff point, and this creates a constriction point causes the steam to enter the cylinder at less than full boiler pressure (called 'wire drawing' of the steam, named after the process of making metal wire by drawing it through a hole), another wasteful thermodynamic effect visible on an indicator diagram.

These inefficiencies drove the widespread experimentation in poppet valve gears for locomotives. Intake and exhaust poppet valves could be moved and controlled independently of each other, allowing for better control of the cycle. In the end, not a great number of locomotives were fitted with poppet valves, but they were common in steam cars and lorries, for example virtually all Sentinel lorries, locomotives and railcars used poppet valves. A very late British design, the SR Leader class, used sleeve valves adapted from internal combustion engines, but this class was not a success.

In stationary steam engines, traction engines and marine engine practice, the shortcomings of valves and valve gears were among the factors that lead to compound expansion. In stationary engines trip valves were also extensively used.

== Valve gear designs ==
Valve gear was a fertile field of invention, with probably several hundred variations devised over the years. However, only a small number of these saw any widespread use. They can be divided into those that drove the standard reciprocating valves (whether piston valves or slide valves), those used with poppet valves, and stationary engine trip gears used with semi-rotary Corliss valves or drop valves.

=== Reciprocating valve gears ===
==== Early types ====
- Slip-eccentric – This gear is now confined to model steam engines, and low power hobby applications such as steam launch engines, ranging to a few horsepower. The eccentric is loose on the crankshaft but there are stops to limit its rotation relative to the crankshaft. Setting the eccentric to the forward running and reverse running positions can be accomplished manually by rotating the eccentric on a stopped engine, or for many engines by simply turning the engine in the desired rotation direction, where the eccentric then positions itself automatically. The engine is pushed forwards to put the eccentric in the forward gear position and backwards to put it in the backward gear position. There is no variable control of cutoff. On the London and North Western Railway, some of the three-cylinder compounds designed by Francis William Webb from 1889 used a slip eccentric to operate the valve of the single low-pressure cylinder. These included the Teutonic, Greater Britain and John Hick classes.
- Gab or hook gear – used on earliest locomotives. Allowed reversing but no control of cutoff.

==== Link gears ====
===== Constant lead gear (Walschaerts-type gear) =====
One component of the motion comes from a crank or eccentric. The other component comes from a separate source, usually the crosshead.

- Walschaerts valve gear – most common valve gear on later locomotives, normally externally mounted. Also known as Heusinger valve gear.
- Deeley valve gear – fitted to several express locomotives on the Midland Railway. The combination levers were driven, as normal, from the crossheads. Each expansion link was driven from the crosshead on the opposite side of the engine.
- Young valve gear – used the piston rod motion on one side of the locomotive to drive the valve gear on the other side. Similar to the Deeley gear, but with detail differences.
- Baguley valve gear – used by W.G. Bagnall.
- Bagnall-Price valve gear – a variation of Walschaerts used by W.G. Bagnall. This gear is fitted to Bagnall 3023 and 3050, both preserved on the Welsh Highland Railway.
- James Thompson Marshall seems to have designed at least two different modifications of Walschaerts gear.
  - One was relatively conventional.
  - The other was very complex and drove separate valves on top of the cylinder (for admission) and underneath the cylinder (for exhaust). After the inventor's death, this gear was fitted experimentally to Southern Railway N Class locomotive number 1850, the work taking from 16 October 1933 to 3 February 1934; but it failed on 22 March 1934. Since the inventor was unable to modify the design, the valve gear was replaced by standard Walschaerts gear between 24 March and 11 April 1934.
- Isaacson's patent valve gear - a modified Walschaerts gear, patented in 1907 by Rupert John Isaacson, and others, patent no. GB190727899, published 13 August 1908. It was fitted to the Garstang and Knot-End Railway's 2-6-0T Blackpool (built 1909) and to Midland Railway No. 382 during 1910–11. Isaacson also has a patent (GB126203, published 8 May 1919) for an improved sight-feed lubricator. This was patented jointly with his representative, Ysabel Hart Cox.
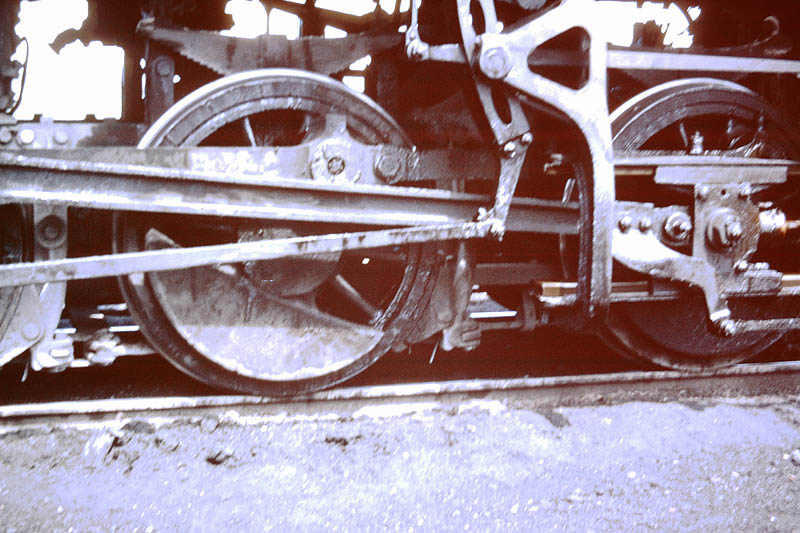
- Soo Line 346 in 1961, showing the Kinkan-Ripken arm on the connecting rod at the right hand edge of the picture
  Kingan-Ripken valve gear. This is a Walschaerts-type gear in which the combination lever is linked to an arm on the connecting rod, near its small end, instead of to the crosshead. Patented in Canada by James B. Kingan and Hugo F. Ripken, patent CA 204805, issued 12 October 1920. This gear was fitted to some locomotives of the Minneapolis, St. Paul and Sault Ste. Marie Railway ("Soo Line"); Hugo Ripken worked as a foreman in the Soo Line's Shoreham Shops in Minneapolis.

===== Dual eccentric gear (Stephenson-type gears) =====
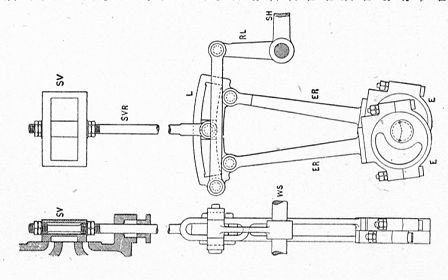
Stephenson's Valve gear. Two eccentrics at nearly 180-degree phase difference work cranks from the main drive shaft. Either can be selected to work the valve slide by shifting the slotted expansion link.

Two eccentrics joined by a curved or straight link. A simple arrangement which works well at low speed. At high speed, a Walschaerts-type gear is said to give better steam distribution and higher efficiency.

- Stephenson valve gear – most common valve gear in the 19th century, normally inside the locomotive frame.
- William T. James valve gear 1832, used first by Baltimore and Ohio Railroad, United States.
- Allan valve gear, a straight-link valve gear. It is fitted to 0-4-0WT "Dolgoch", preserved on the Talyllyn Railway.
- Gooch valve gear

==== Lever and link gear (Baker-type) ====
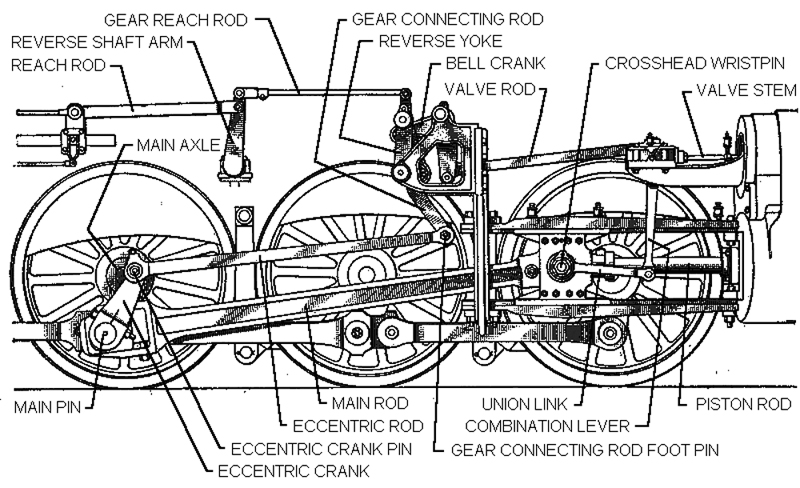
Baker valve gear assembly

- Baker valve gear – fairly common in the United States, it had no sliding parts.

==== Radial gears ====
Both components of the motion come from a single crank or eccentric. A problem with this arrangement (when applied to locomotives) is that one of the components of the motion is affected by the rise and fall of the locomotive on its springs. This probably explains why radial gears were largely superseded by Walschaerts-type gears in railway practice but continued to be used in traction and marine engines.

- Hackworth valve gear invented by John Wesley Hackworth in 1859.
- Joy valve gear – a design used extensively on the L&YR and LNWR in England, and elsewhere. A preserved example is LNWR G2a Class number 49395.
- Marshall valve gear – a modified Hackworth gear, patented in 1879 by Marshall, Sons & Co. A modern application is to the miniature locomotive Badger.
- Brown valve gear – Invented by Charles Brown (1827–1905) who was the father of Charles Eugene Lancelot Brown. This gear was used by Corpet-Louvet and Duffield Bank Railway.
- Southern valve gear – Briefly popular in the United States around 1920. It had elements of the Baker patterns, but dispensed with the combination lever of the Walschaerts.

=== Poppet valve gears ===
- Caprotti valve gear, British Caprotti valve gear
- Hugo Lentz, oscillating-cam valve gear, rotary-cam valve gear
- Franklin oscillating-cam valve gear
- Franklin rotary-cam valve gear
- Reidinger valve gear

=== Conjugating gears ===
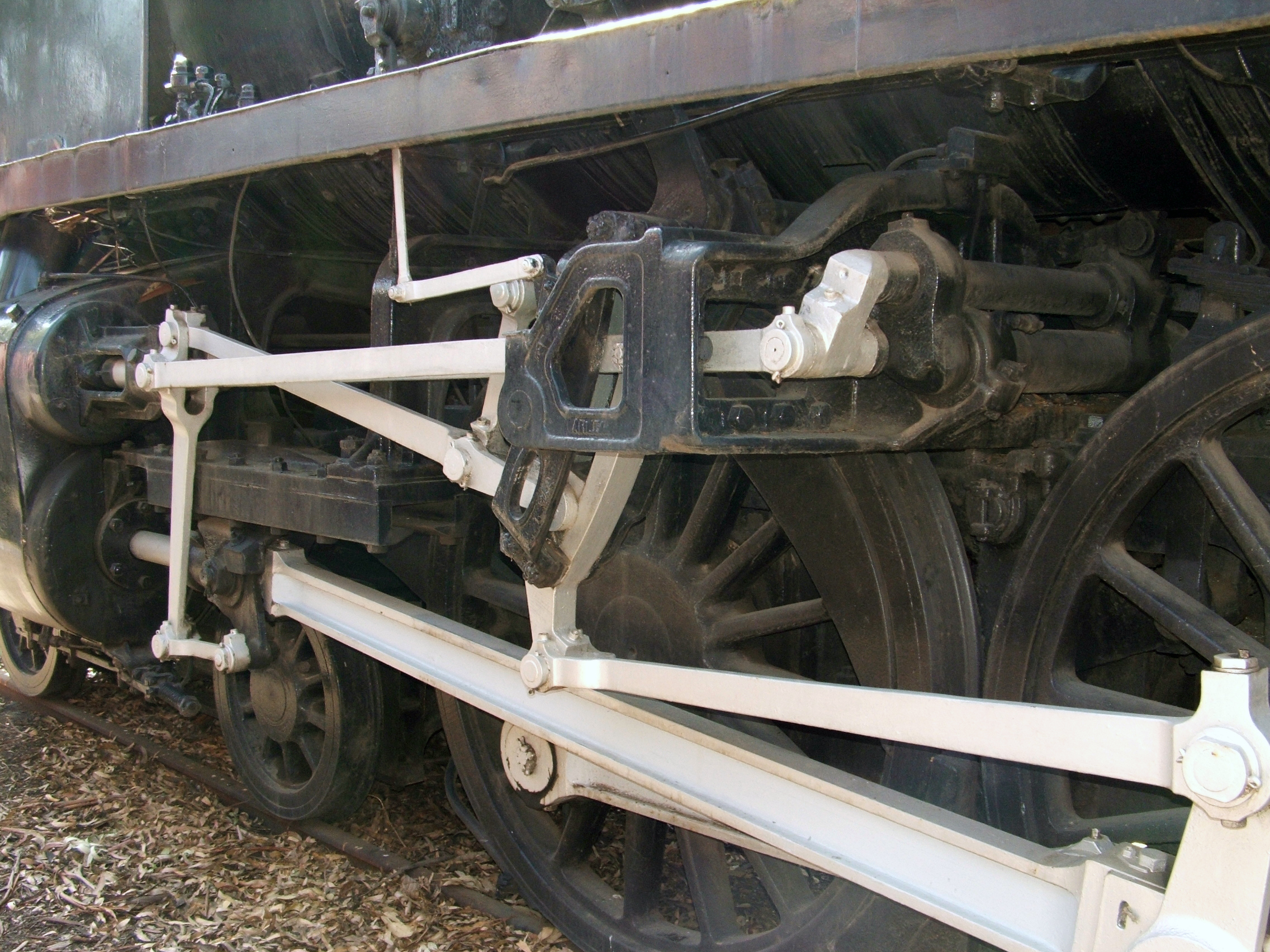
View of Henschel & Son conjugated valve gear mechanism used on Victorian Railways H class locomotive, driven from the outside Walschaerts valve gear

These enable a 3-cylinder or 4-cylinder locomotive to be built with only two sets of valve gear. The best known is Gresley conjugated valve gear, used on 3-cylinder locomotives. Walschaerts gear is usually used for the two outside cylinders. Two levers connected to the outside cylinder valve rods drive the valve for the inside cylinder. Harold Holcroft devised a different method for conjugating valve gear by linking the middle cylinder to the combination lever assembly of an outside cylinder, creating the Holcroft valve gear derivative. On a 4-cylinder locomotive the arrangement is simpler. The valve gear may be inside or outside and only short rocking-shafts are needed to link the valves on the inside and outside cylinders.

=== Bulleid chain-driven valve gear ===
See Bulleid chain-driven valve gear

=== Corliss valve gear ===
See Corliss steam engine

Large stationary engines often used an advanced form of valve gear developed by George Henry Corliss, usually called Corliss valve gear. This gear used separate valves for inlet and exhaust so that the inlet cut-off could be controlled precisely. The use of separate valves and port passages for steam admission and exhaust significantly also reduced losses associated with cylinder condensation and re-evaporation. These features resulted in much improved efficiency.

== Controls for valve gear ==
A locomotive's direction of travel and cut-off are set from the cab by using a reversing lever or screw reverser actuating a rod reaching to the valve gear proper. Some larger steam engines employ a power reverse, which is a servo mechanism, usually powered by steam. This makes control of the reversing gear easier for the driver.

== See also ==
- Cutoff
- Reversing gear
- Steam locomotive nomenclature
- Trofimoff valve
