= Trip valve gear =

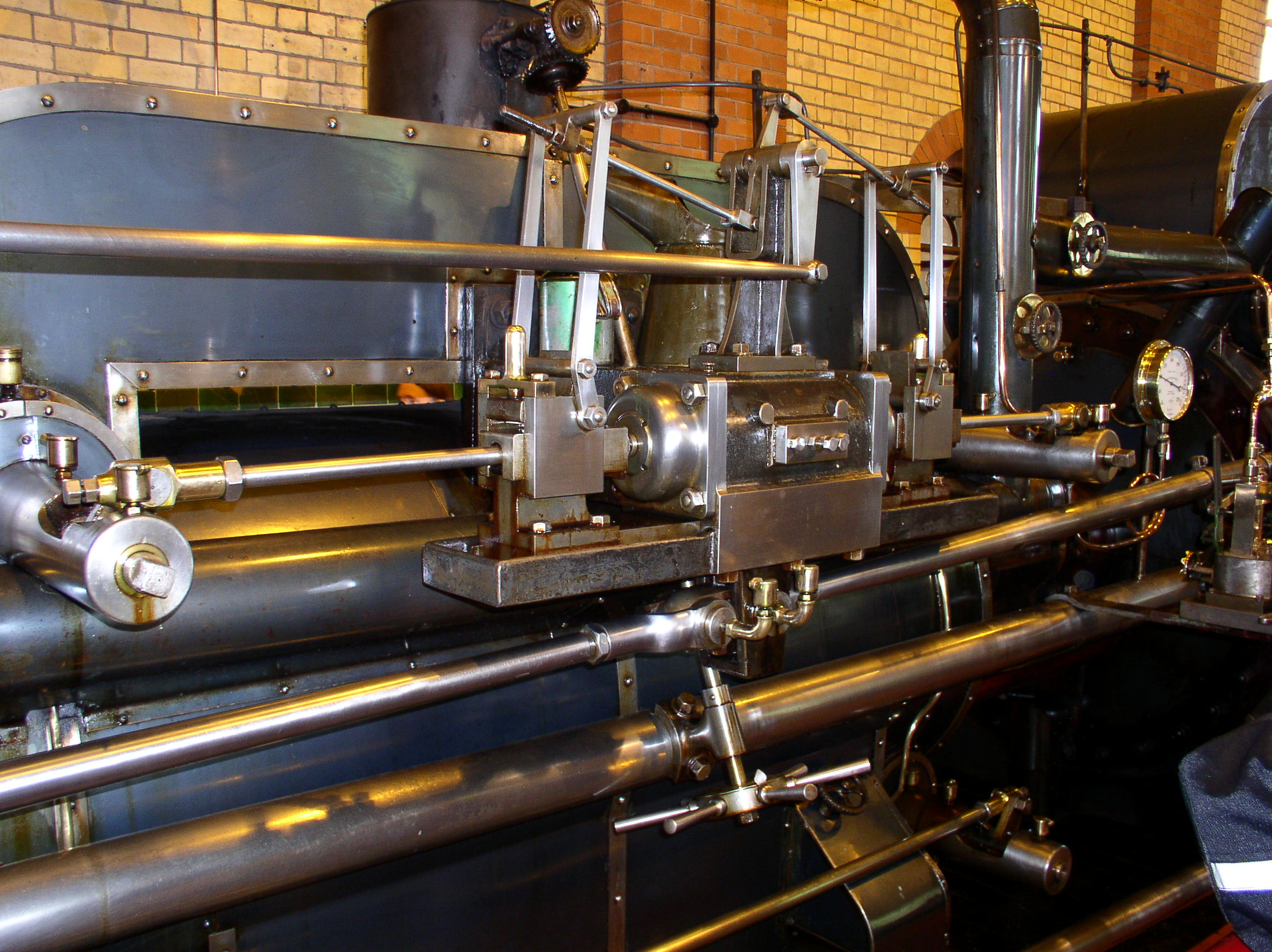
Trip gear operating Corliss valves on the high-pressure cylinder of the Ashton Frost engine at Mill Meece Pumping Station

Trip valve mechanisms are a class of steam engine valve gear developed to improve efficiency. The trip mechanism allows the inlet valve to be closed rapidly, giving a short, sharp cut-off. The valve itself can be a drop valve or a Corliss valve.

Trip valve gear was applied to larger stationary engines. It was not used in transport applications, (Note: An exception was the very early London Steam Carriage (1803) which had a form of trip gear.) as it was not suitable for high speed.

The trip point of the valve mechanism, and therefore the cut-off, would be adjusted either manually or automatically by the governor. The valve is opened by the mechanical valve gear mechanism, and when the trip gear trigger releases the mechanism the valve is snapped closed, usually by a spring acting against a dashpot.

== Advantages of a Trip Valve Gear ==
When using the Corliss and other trip valve gears, the possible advantages are:

1. By allowing the inlet-valves to open quickly, full boiler-pressure can be established in the cylinder early in the stroke.
2. Due to how quickly the inlet-valve closes, the area of the work-diagram is increased. This is due to a sharp corner at the cut-off point rather than a rounded curve. When a rounded curve is present here the pressure from wire-drawing is lowered gradually due to the gradual closure of the valve.
3. Due to this gear being created for engines designed to be regulated by varying admission, it has an advantage of making terminal pressure low. These engines secure this regulation without creating irregularities in exhaust functions due to them always having multiple-valve engines.
4. Adjusting these independent valves can be easy if variations at both ends of the cylinder is something that is wanted.
5. Due to the small amount of motion and period of rest for the steam-valves after they have closed helps to reduce the friction in the valve-gear which in turn decreases the loss of power.

== Disadvantages of a Trip Valve Gear ==
The trip valve-gear, which is almost always a multiple valve-gear, has the potential to face the following disadvantages:

1. Many times, these gears have multiple complicated parts.
2. Engines which are created with these complicated gears can be expensive.
3. The limitation of rotative speed or the number of revolutions which are caused by the need for engaging catches and valves can be a down fall in these valve-gears.
4. It is important for this valve to release prior to the valve reaching its greatest point of opening. This is an issue due to the way it limits the range.
