= Steam Museum, Straffan =

The Steam Museum
- An Músaem Innealtóireachta
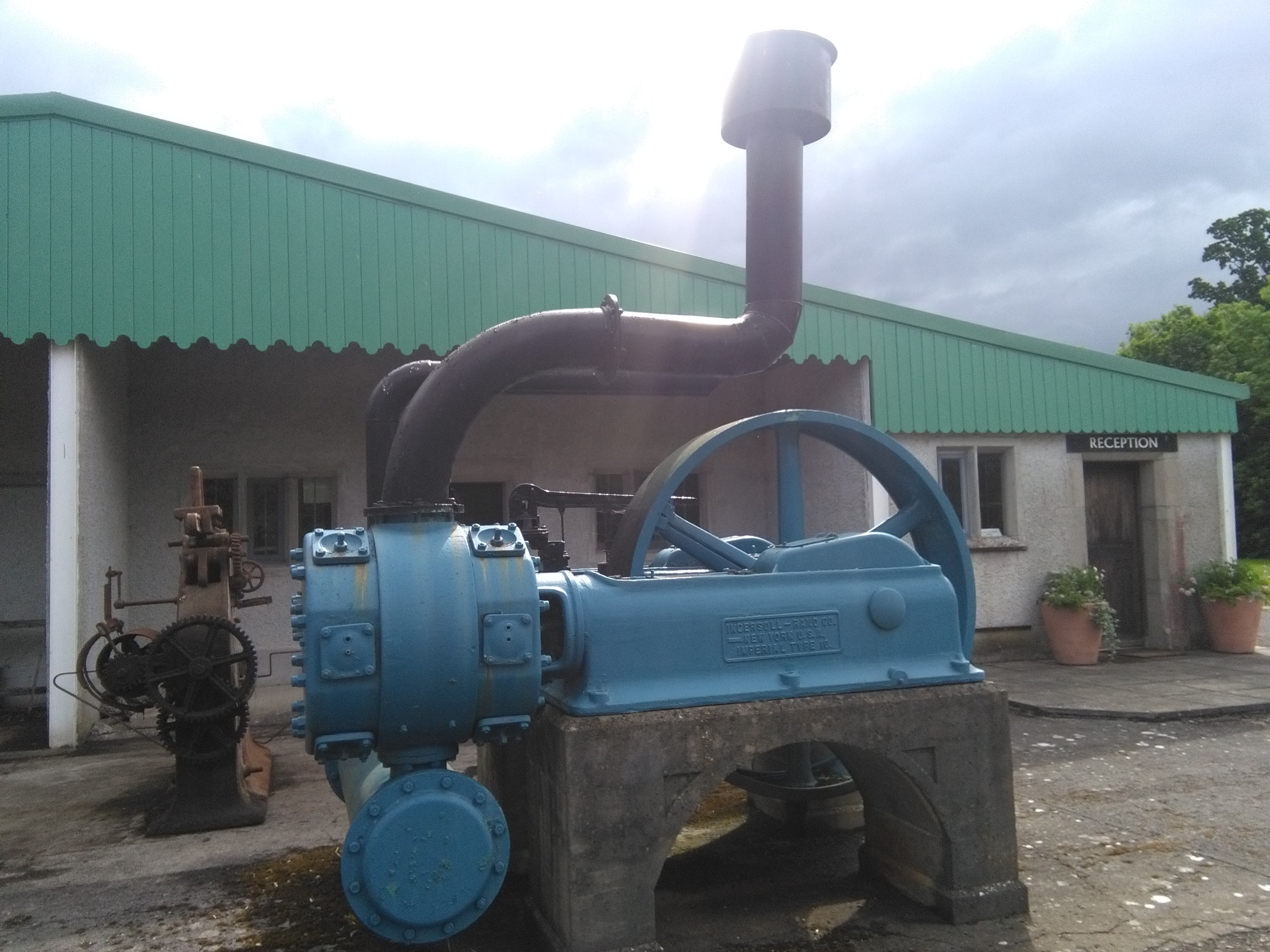
- An Ingersoll Rand air compressor, Imperial Type 10 (c. 1912)

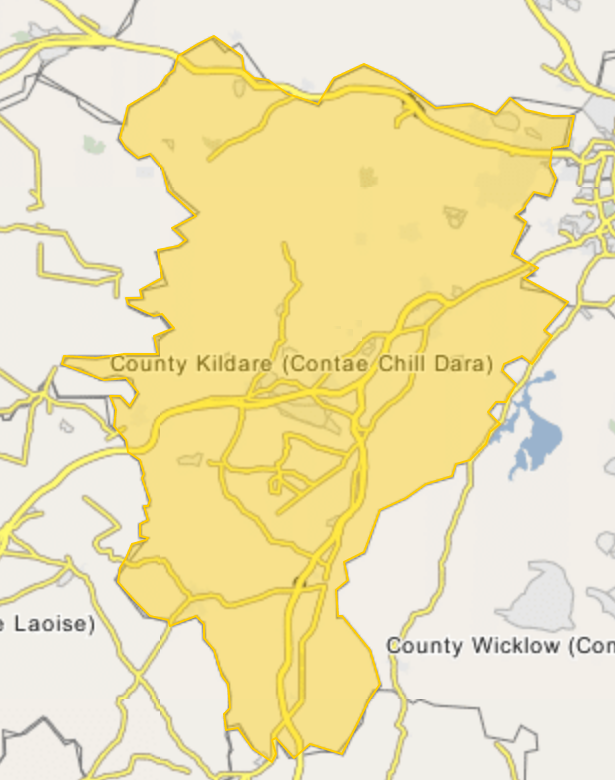
- Location within County Kildare
- Established: 1988
- Location: Straffan, County Kildare, Ireland
- Coordinates: 53°18′42″N 6°35′56″W
- Type: Steam museum
- Public transit access: Straffan bus stop (Bus Éireann routes 120, 121, 123)
- Website: steam-museum.com

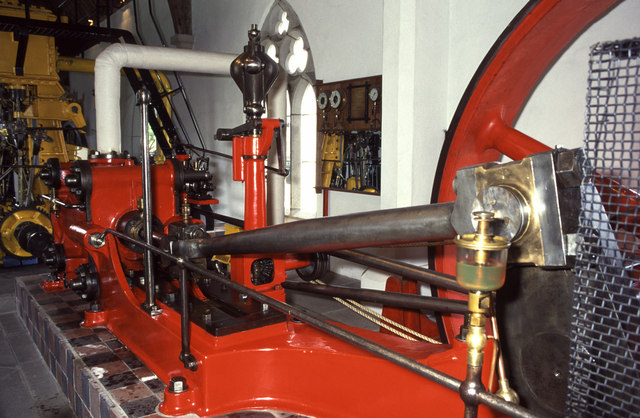
Engine in the Steam Museum

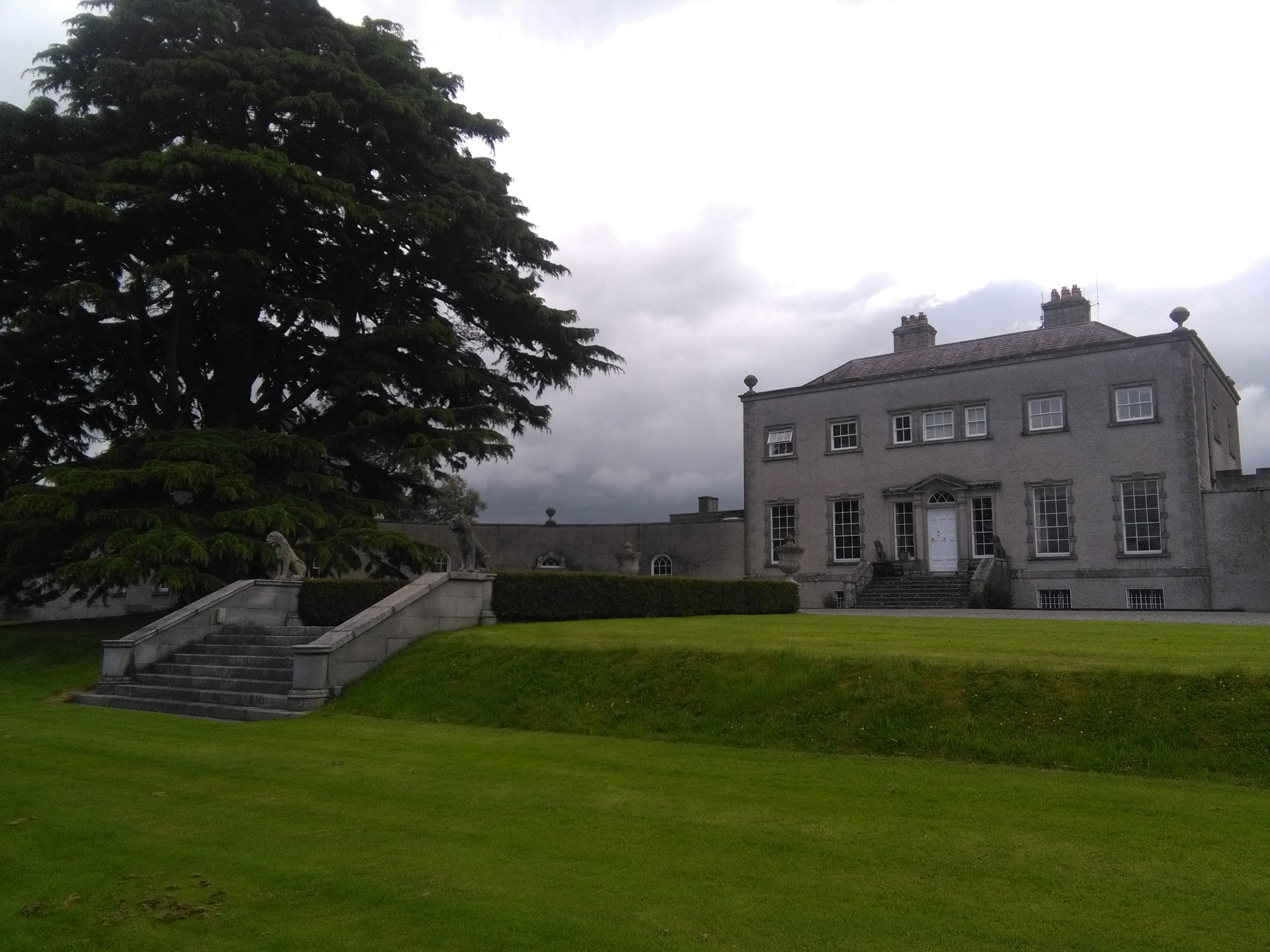
Lodge Park "big house"

The Steam Museum & Lodge Park Walled Garden is a steam museum and tourist destination in Straffan, County Kildare, Ireland.

== Location ==
The Straffan Steam Museum is housed in a church building which once stood by the Inchicore railway works in Dublin. The church building was later moved and rebuilt in Straffan in Kildare.

The museum is located on the site of Lodge Park, a former "big house", which has an 18th-century walled garden.

== Collection ==
This steam museum contains a collection of prototype model locomotives and live steam engines. Two of the locomotives on display were used in the late 19th century by the Great Northern Railway.

The museum also has a selection of steam engines used for industrial propulsion, including a large beam engine used in the old Midleton Whiskey Distillery, a pumping engine once employed in Jameson's Distillery in Dublin, and a beam engine installed in Smithwick's Brewery, Kilkenny, in 1847.

== Operations ==
The museum is open to visitors from Wednesdays to Sundays during the summer, from 2pm to 6pm. It has a café and a small shop.
