= Jacob Leupold =

German physicist, mathematician, instrument maker, mining commissioner and engineer

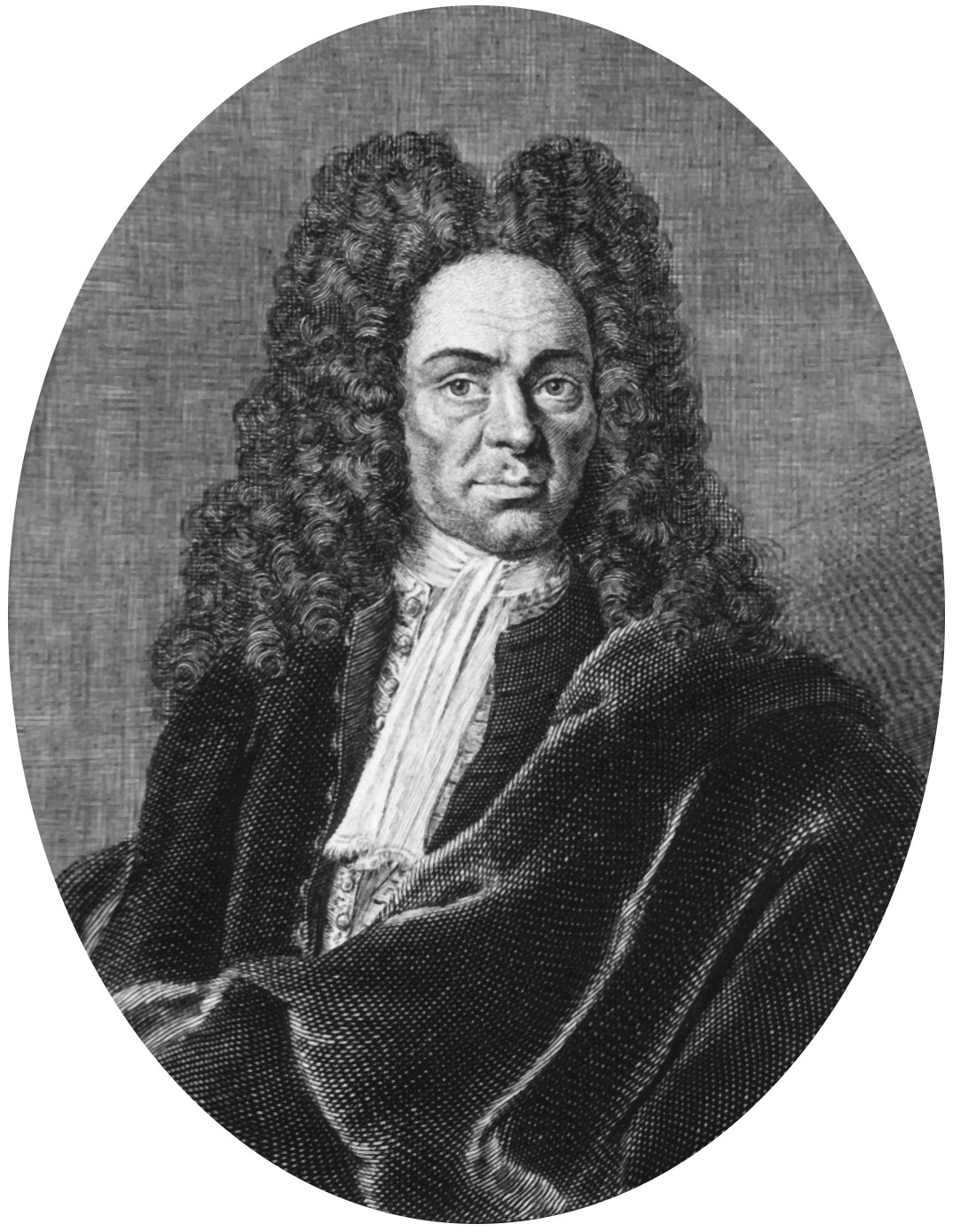
Jacob Leupold (1674-1727)

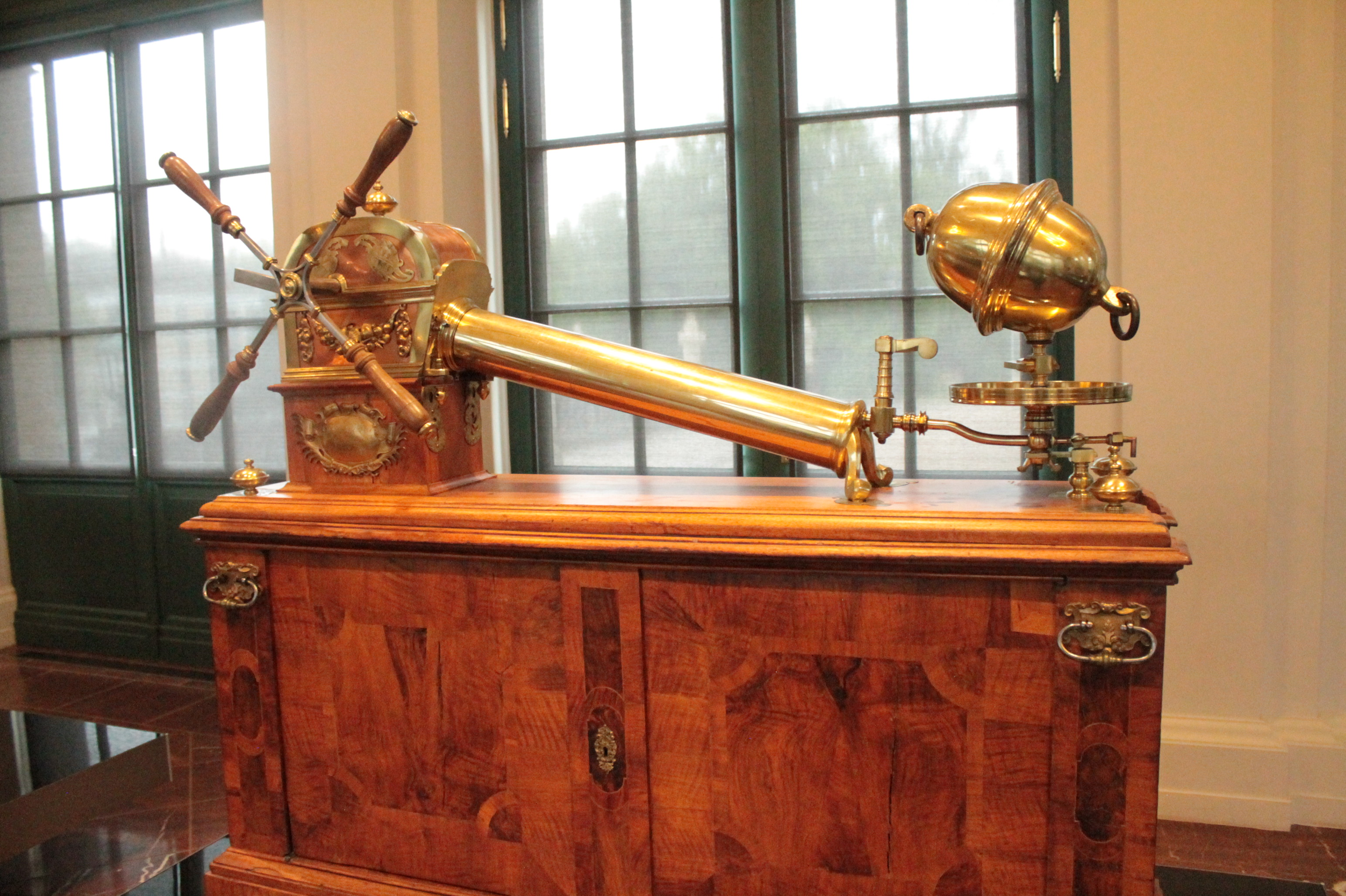
Jacob Leupold's vacuum pump of 1709, Dresdem museum of Technical Instruments

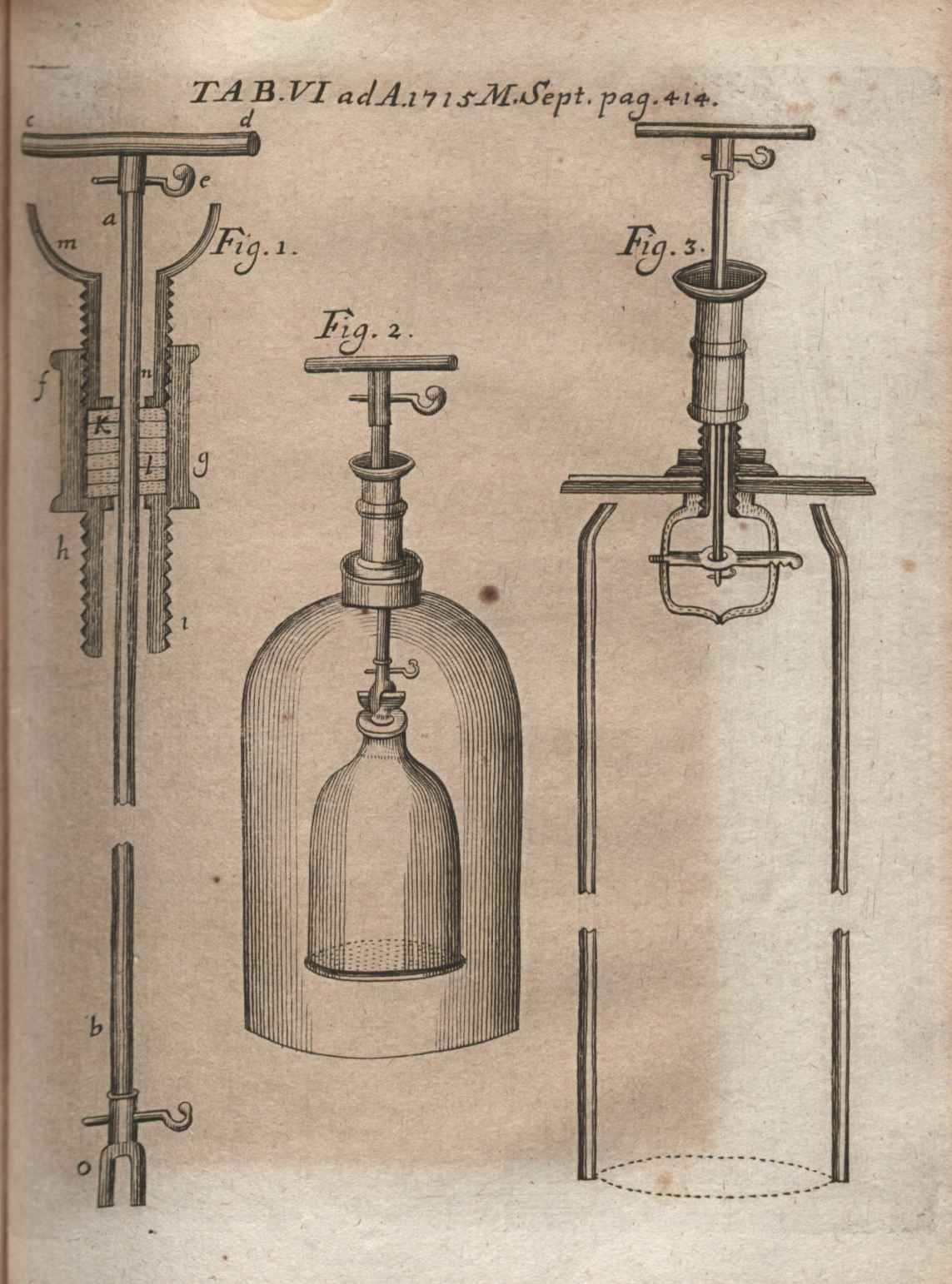
Illustration about ''Antliae pneumaticae'' from Acta Eruditorum, 1715

Jacob Leupold (22 July 1674 – 12 January 1727) was a German physicist, mathematician, instrument maker, mining commissioner and engineer. He wrote the seminal book Theatrum Machinarum Generale ("The General Theory of Machines").

== Early life ==
Jacob Leupold built many instruments needed for experimental physics studies. In 1699 Leupold's interests had fully changed to mechanics and mathematics.

== Working life ==
In 1701 Leupold obtained a position as an economist in George Military Hospital, thus ensuring a regular income but not enough free time to dedicate himself to mechanics.

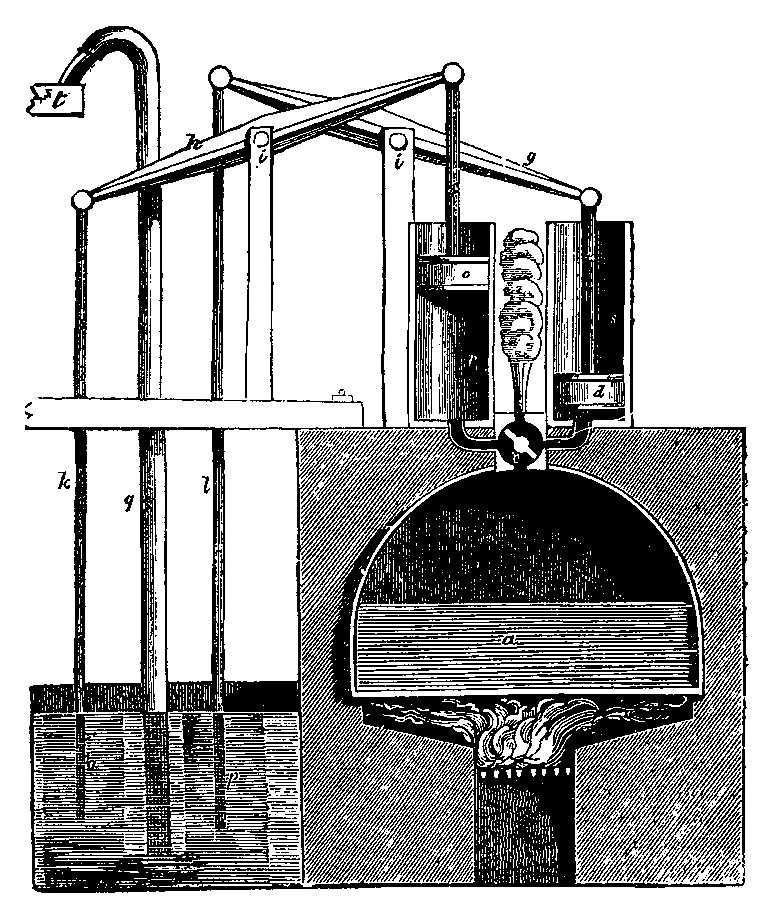
Leupold's steam engine, 1720.

In the 17th century, the main instruments for experimental physics were the telescope, the microscope, the pendulum clock and the vacuum pump, invented in 1656 by Otto von Guericke. Leupold is also credited as an early inventor of air pump. He designed his first pump in 1705, in 1707 he published a book "Antlia pneumatica illustrata". In 1711 following the advice of its president G. W. Leibniz, the Prussian Academy of Sciences acquired Leupold's pump. In 1715 Leupold became a member of academy. In 1720 Leupold started to work on the manuscript of Theatrum Machinarum. It was the first systematic analysis of mechanical engineering. It included, ahead of its time, a design for a high-pressure non-condensing steam engine, the likes of which were not built until the early 19th century. Theatrum machinarum consists of 10 illustrated volumes. It was published in Leipzig between 1724 and 1739.

== Personal life ==
He married Anna Elizabeth and they had three sons and three daughters who all died young except for one daughter. His wife died in 1713. Leupold died on 12 January 1727 at age 53.

== Sources ==
- Biography of Jacob Leupold
- Full text of Theatrum Machinarum Generale (Volume 1)
