= List of steam museums =

Steam museums around the world include:

== Australia ==
- Powerhouse Museum in Sydney

== Canada ==
- Hamilton Waterworks in Hamilton, Ontario
- Ontario Agricultural Museum in Milton, Ontario
- Steam Era in Milton, Ontario

== Channel Islands ==
- Pallot Heritage Steam Museum in Jersey

== Ireland ==
- Steam Museum, Straffan

== United Kingdom ==
- Bolton Steam Museum
- Bressingham Steam and Gardens - Gardens, Steam railways and museum of steam vehicles
- Coldharbour Mill - a working textile mill museum with steam and water power
- Crofton Beam Engines
- Hollycombe Steam Collection
- Kempton Park Steam Engines
- Kew Bridge Steam Museum
- London Museum of Water & Steam

== United States ==
- Antique Powerland, Brooks, Oregon
- New England Wireless and Steam Museum East Greenwich, Rhode Island

== See also ==
- Pumping station#List of pumping stations, many of which are, or were, steam-powered.
- List of steam fairs, events where steam engines, particularly traction engines, may be seen working'.
