= Science and technology in the United Kingdom =

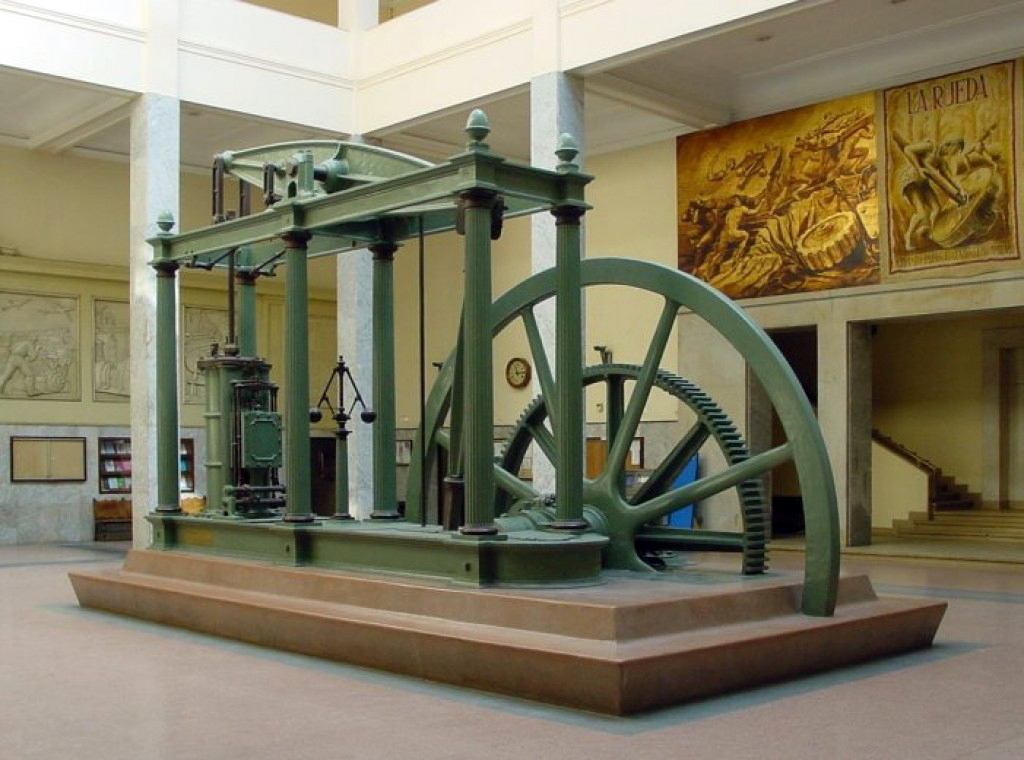
A Watt steam engine, which powered the Industrial Revolution in the United Kingdom and played a key role in it becoming the world's first industrialised nation (Note: Watt steam engine image: located in the lobby of into the Superior Technical School of Industrial Engineers of the UPM (Madrid))

Science and technology in the United Kingdom has a long history, producing many important figures and developments in the field. Major theorists from the United Kingdom of Great Britain and Northern Ireland include Isaac Newton whose laws of motion and theory of gravitation have been recognized as foundational to modern science and Charles Darwin whose theory of evolution by natural selection was fundamental to the development of modern biology. Major scientific discoveries include hydrogen by Henry Cavendish, penicillin by Alexander Fleming, and the structure of DNA, by Francis Crick and others. Major engineering projects and applications pursued by people from the United Kingdom include the steam locomotive developed by Richard Trevithick and Andrew Vivian, the jet engine by Frank Whittle and the World Wide Web by Tim Berners-Lee. The United Kingdom continues to play a major role in the development of science and technology and major technological sectors include the aerospace, motor and pharmaceutical industries.

== Important advances made by British people ==
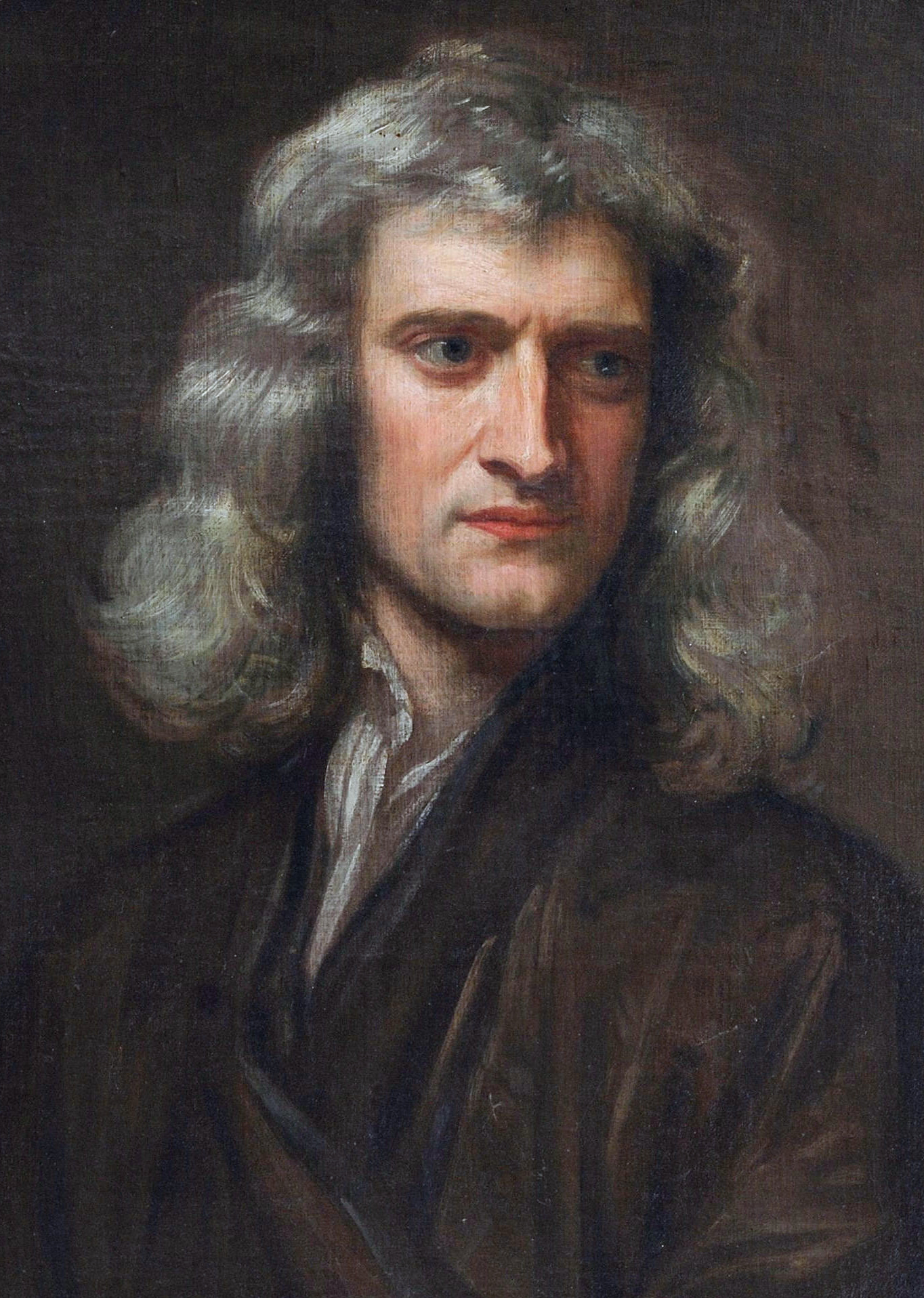
Sir Isaac Newton (1643–1727) with his important contributions to classical physics and mathematics

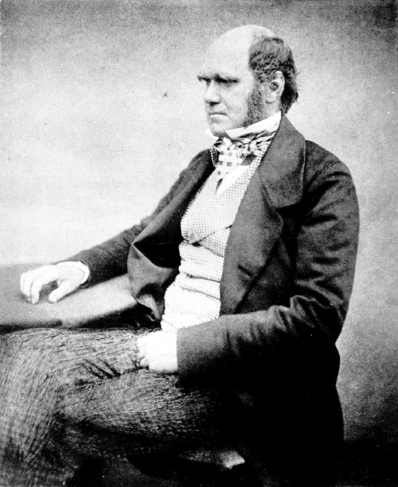
Charles Darwin (1809–82) whose theory of evolution by natural selection is the foundation of modern biological sciences

England (which included Wales at the time) and Scotland were leading centres of the Scientific Revolution from the 17th century. The United Kingdom led the Industrial Revolution from the 18th century, and has continued to produce scientists and engineers credited with important advances. Some of the major theories, discoveries and applications advanced by people from the United Kingdom are given below.

- The development of empiricism and its role in scientific method, by Francis Bacon (1561–1626).
- The laws of motion and illumination of gravity, by physicist, mathematician, astronomer, natural philosopher, alchemist and theologian, Sir Isaac Newton (1643–1727).
- The discovery of hydrogen, by Henry Cavendish (1731–1810).
- The steam locomotive, by Richard Trevithick (1771–1833) and Andrew Vivian (1759–1842).
- An early electric motor, by Michael Faraday (1771–1867), whose work made electricity practical for technological applications.
- The theory of aerodynamics, by Sir George Cayley (1773–1857).
- The first public steam railway, by George Stephenson (1781–1848).
- The first commercial electrical telegraph, co-invented by Sir William Fothergill Cooke (1806–79) and Charles Wheatstone (1802–75).
- First tunnel under a navigable river, first all iron ship and first railway to run express services, contributed to by Isambard Kingdom Brunel (1806–59).
- Evolution by natural selection, by Charles Darwin (1809–82).
- The invention of the incandescent light bulb, by Joseph Swan (1826–1914).
- The unification of electromagnetism, by James Clerk Maxwell (1831–79).
- The first practical telephone, patented by Alexander Graham Bell (1847–1922). (Note: Alexander Graham Bell, born and raised in Scotland, made a number of inventions as a British citizen, notably the telephone in 1876; he did not become an American citizen until 1882, and then spent the remaining years of his life predominately living in Canada at a summer residence.)
- The discovery of penicillin, by biologist and pharmacologist, Sir Alexander Fleming (1881–1955).
- The world's first working television system, and colour television, by John Logie Baird (1888–1946).
- The first meaningful synthesis of quantum mechanics with special relativity by Paul Dirac (1902–84) in the equation named after him, and his subsequent prediction of antimatter.
- The invention of the jet engine, by Frank Whittle (1907–96).
- The invention of the hovercraft, by Christopher Cockerell (1910–99).
- The Bombe computer, developed by Alan Turing (1912–54), was an early electromechanical computer designed for code-breaking during World War II at Bletchley Park.
- The structure of DNA, by Francis Crick (1916–2004) and others.
- The invention of modern data communication by Donald Davies (1924–2000), including packet switching, high-speed routers, hierarchical computer networks, layered communication protocols and the essence of the end-to-end principle. (Note: In the early 1960s, Paul Baran invented distributed adaptive message block switching for digital communication of voice messages using switches that were low-cost electronics. His work did not include routers with software switches and communication protocols, nor the idea that users, rather than the network itself, would provide the reliability.)
- The theoretical breakthrough of the Higgs mechanism to explain electroweak symmetry breaking and why some particles have mass, by Peter Higgs (1929–2024).
- Theories in cosmology, quantum gravity and black holes, by Stephen Hawking (1942–2018).
- The invention of the World Wide Web, by Tim Berners-Lee (1955–).

== Technology-based industries ==
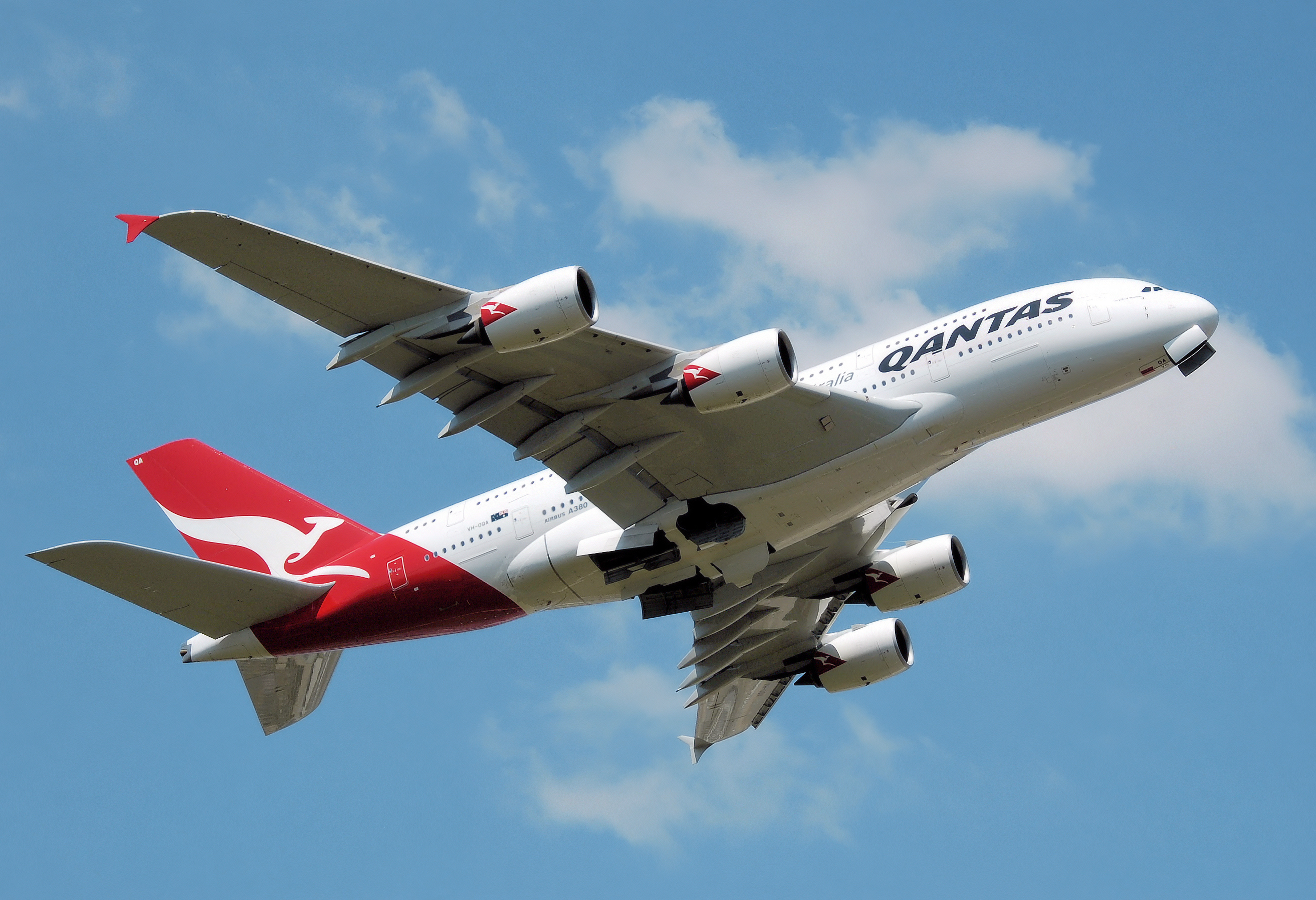
The Airbus A380 has wings and engines manufactured in the United Kingdom.

The United Kingdom plays a leading part in the aerospace industry. Companies such as Rolls-Royce are major players in the aero-engine market, while BAE Systems serves as Britain's largest defence supplier and the Pentagon's sixth largest. Large companies including GKN act as major suppliers to the Airbus project. Two British-based companies, GlaxoSmithKline and AstraZeneca, ranked in the top five pharmaceutical companies in the world by sales in 2009 and UK companies have discovered and developed more leading medicines than any other country apart from the US. The UK remains a leading centre of automotive design and production, particularly of engines, and in 2011 had around 2,600 component manufacturers. Investment by venture capital firms in UK technology companies was $9.7 billion from 2010 to 2015.

The UK technology sector represents a significant portion of the global technology industry, and valued at $1.2 trillion in the first half of 2025.

== Scientific research ==
A Welsh Government short video of science in Wales

Scientific research and development remains important in British universities, with many institutions establishing science parks to facilitate production and cooperation with industry. Between 2004 and 2012, the United Kingdom produced 6% of the world's scientific research papers and had an 8% share of scientific citations, the third- and second-highest in the world (after the United States' 9% and China's 7% respectively). Scientific journals produced in the UK include Nature, the British Medical Journal and The Lancet.

Britain was one of the largest recipients of research funding from the European Union. From 2007 to 2013, the UK received €8.8 billion out of a total of €107 billion expenditure on research, development and innovation in EU Member States, associated and third countries. At the time, this represented the fourth largest share in the EU. The European Research Council granted 79 projects funding in the UK in 2017, more than any other EU country. The United Kingdom was ranked 6th in the Global Innovation Index in 2026 and 2025.

== See also ==
- Government Office for Science
- Internet in the United Kingdom
- List of exports of the United Kingdom
- Manufacturing in the United Kingdom
- Telecommunications in the United Kingdom
