= William Felton (coachmaker) =

London coachmaker

Illustrations from Treatise on Carriages book
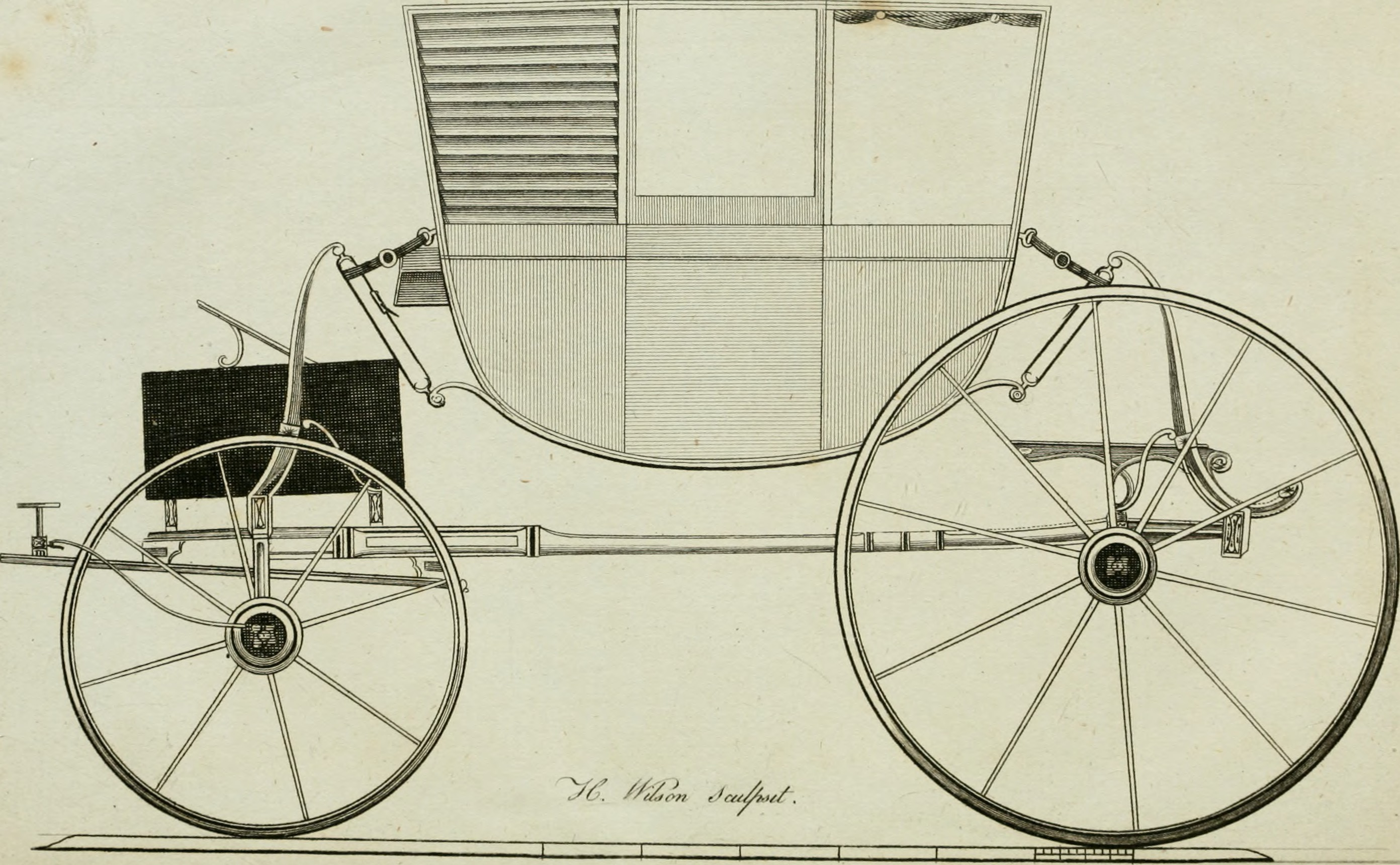
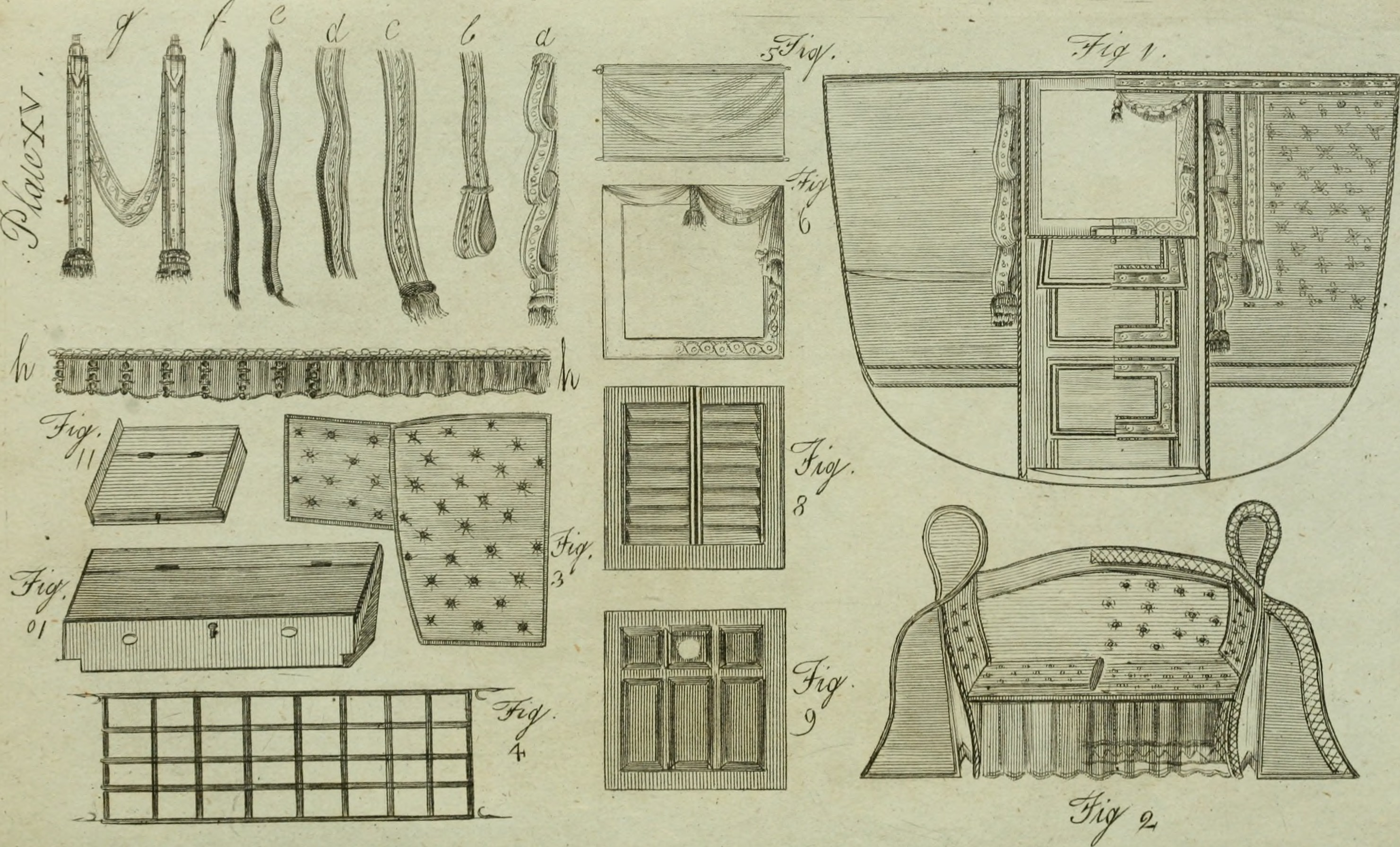
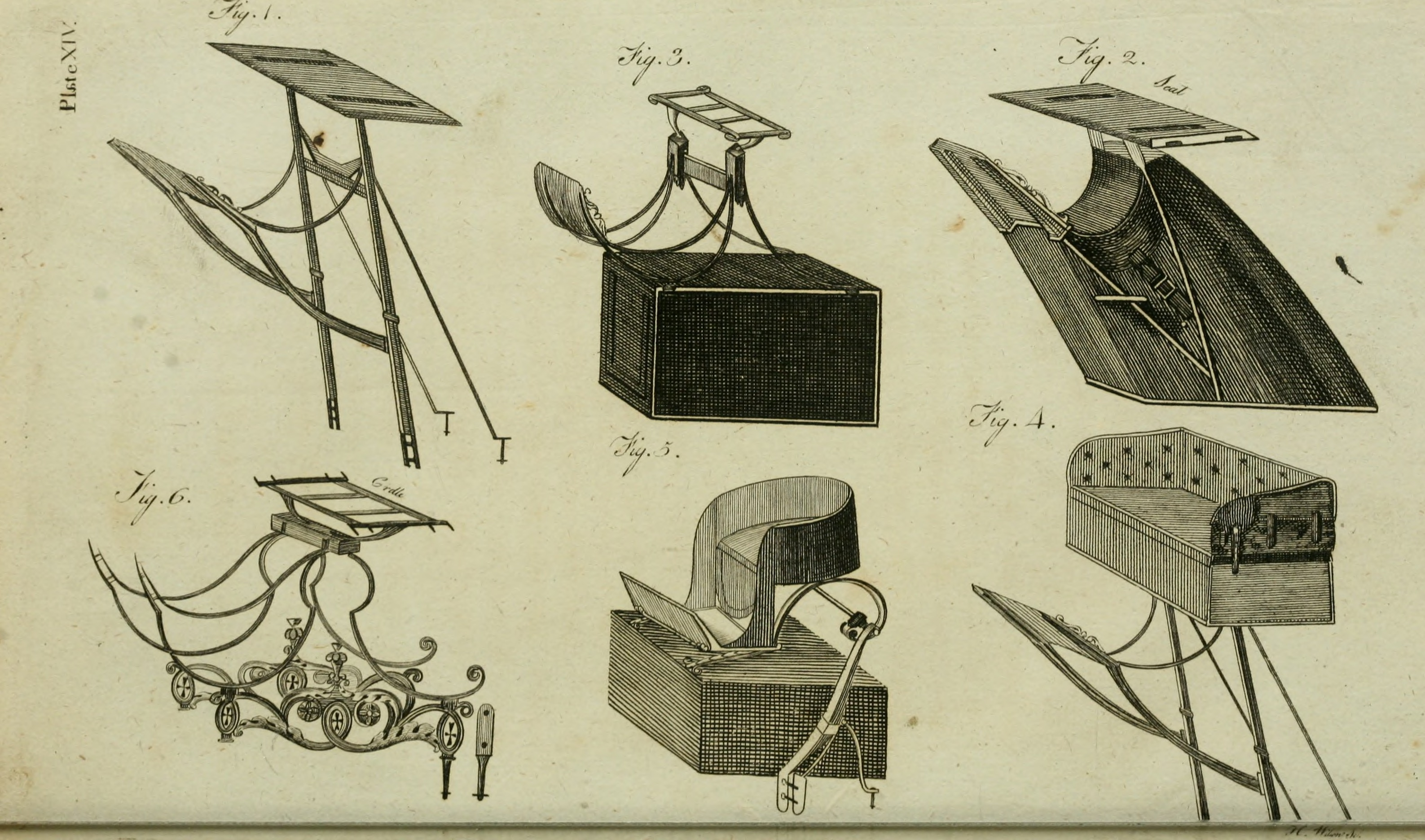
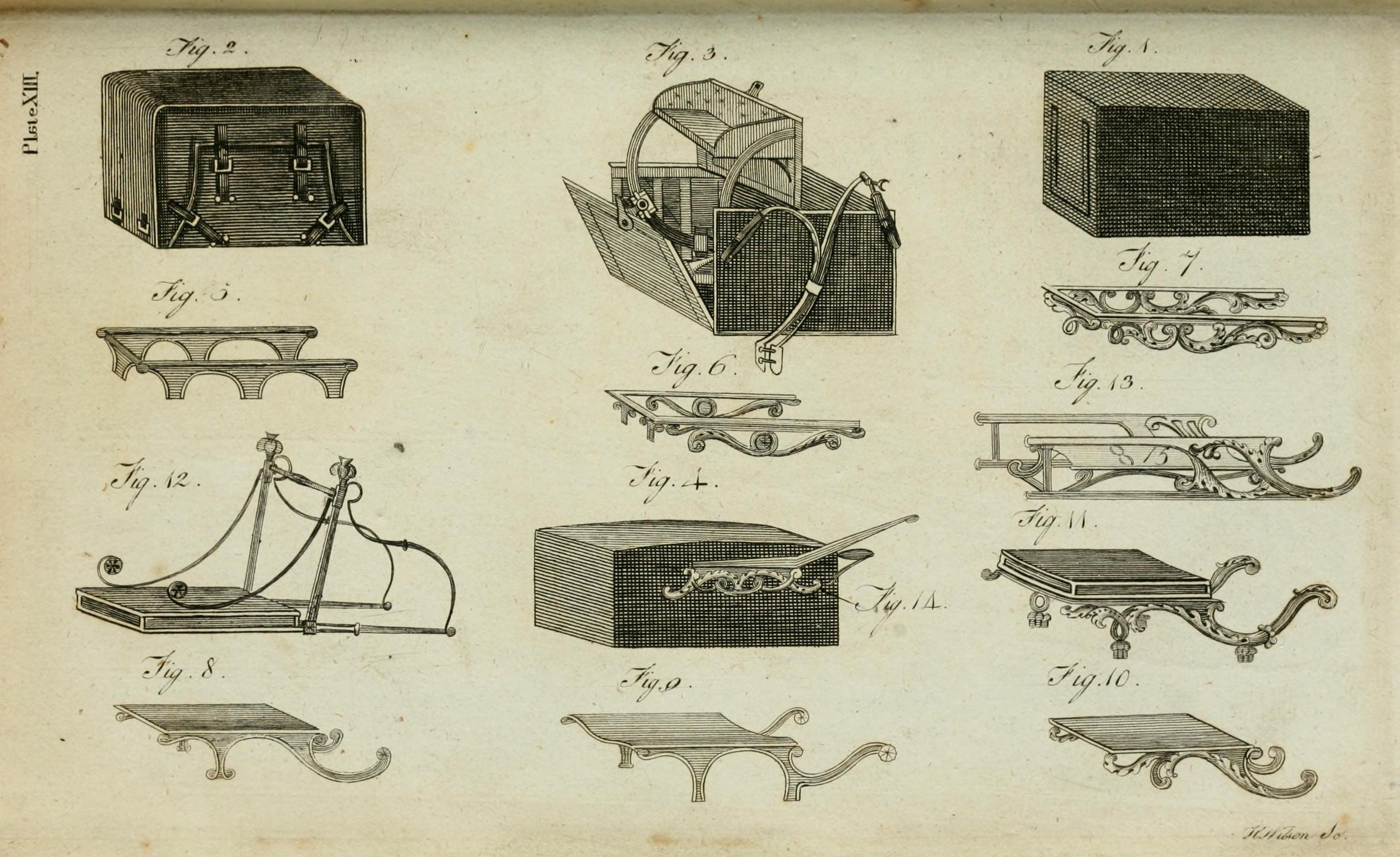

William Felton was a London coachmaker from 36 Leather Lane in Holborn, and 254 Oxford Street near Grosvenor Square, and noted for his 1796 illustrated two-volume book, A Treatise on Carriages; comprehending Coaches, Chariots, Phaetons, Curricles, Gigs, Whiskies, &c Together with their Proper Harness in which the Fair Prices of Every Article are Accurately Stated.

In the introduction, Felton wrote that he had no literary pretensions, but rather that his aim was to produce an authoritative guide to the construction, maintenance and repair of horse-drawn coaches. The Monthly Review agreed that it was not a literary masterpiece, but praised it for its encyclopaedic treatment of the subject. The Sporting Magazine in its sixth issue was equally complimentary about Felton's Treatise.

In the 1806 publication "A List of Bankrupts with their Dividends and Certificates, &c. &c. for the last Twenty Years and Six Months from January 1, 1786 to June 24, 1806 inclusive", William Felton's name is entered on 3 December 1803. The 1823 edition of "Kent's Original London Directory" lists W. J. Felton of 6 Long Acre Street as being a coachmaker.

== Steam-powered carriage ==
Richard Trevithick's 1803 London Steam Carriage was the first steam-powered vehicle designed for transporting passengers around London but it was never a commercial success. The carriage was carried by ship from Falmouth to London and arrived at Felton’s carriage works in Leather Lane in April 1803. Felton constructed the body, designed to accommodate eight people. The driver steered the front wheel using a tiller, with the engineman on a low step behind the coach. In July 1803, it was driven for some ten miles to Paddington, then back through Islington with 8 passengers, and as a precaution, streets were closed to other vehicles. On one of the vehicle's test runs it tore down 7 yards of garden railing, causing London's first motor accident.

In the 1980s a full-size replica of the London steam carriage was constructed. It was driven on the streets of Camborne on 28 April 2001, and in July 2003 retraced some of the original route between the Felton works in Leather Lane and St Cross Street.

A plaque marking the route was unveiled:

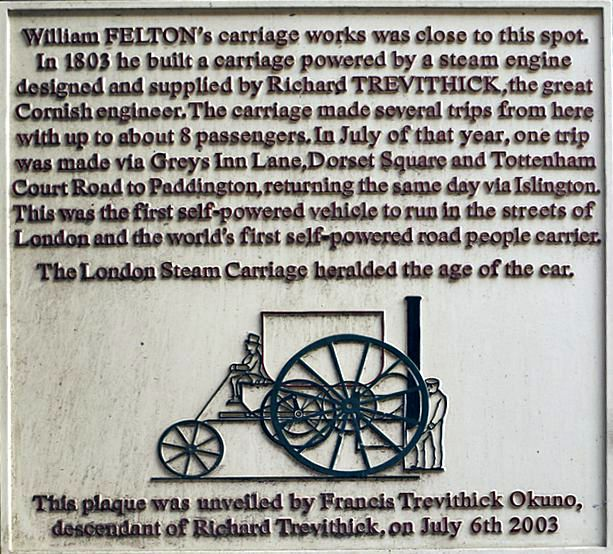
Plaque in London's Leather Lane

William FELTON's carriage works was close to this spot. In 1803 he built a carriage powered by a steam engine designed and supplied by Richard TREVITHICK, the great Cornish engineer. The carriage made several trips from here with up to about 8 passengers. In July of that year, one trip was made via Greys Inn Lane, Dorset Square and Tottenham Court Road to Paddington, returning the same day via Islington. This was the first self-powered vehicle to run in the streets of London and the world’s first self-powered road people carrier. The London Steam Carriage heralded the age of the car. This plaque was unveiled by Francis Trevithick Okuno, descendant of Richard Trevithick, on July 6th 2003.

== Bibliography ==
- Felton, William (1796). A Treatise on Carriages. Volume I, Volume II
  A Treatise on Carriages (Reprint of both volumes). Astragal Press. 1996. ISBN 1879335700. OL 21753408M.
