= Robert Dickinson (businessman) =

19th century English businessman

Robert Dickinson was an English businessman who went into partnership with Richard Trevithick in 1808. Dickinson had previously been a West Indian Merchant. He lived at 58 Great Queen Street, London.

He provided most of the financial backing for a series of patents and other projects that the partnership developed but Trevithick also tried to raise money by selling or mortgaging various mine shares and other property. However the partnership was declared bankrupt on 5 February 1811 with debts of £4,000. Trevithick cleared the debts at 16 shillings in the pound (i.e. 80%) by 1 January 1814. Dickinson contributed nothing to this.

Dickinson continued taking out patents, being granted a six-month patents for an improvement to saddles and also for improvements to barrels and other storage devices using iron. In 1817 he had an article "Prospectus of a new system of beaconing" published by the Philosophical Magazine concerning a patent he had taken out in November.
