= London Steam Carriage =

Early steam-powered road vehicle

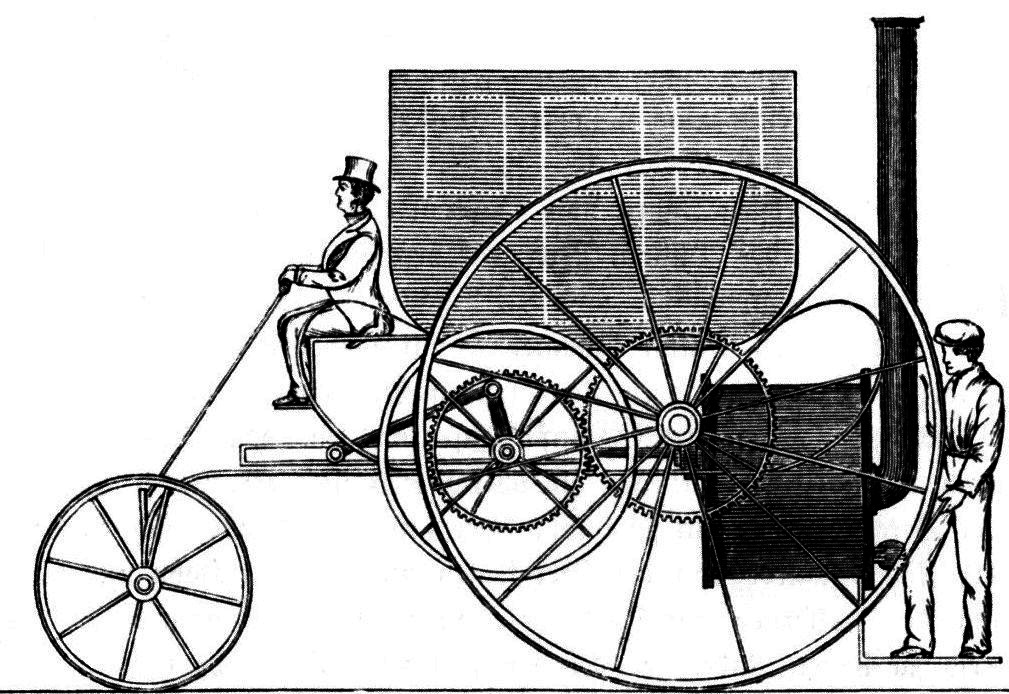
Trevithick's London Steam Carriage 1803

The London Steam Carriage was an early steam-powered road vehicle constructed by Richard Trevithick in 1803 and the world's first self-propelled passenger-carrying vehicle. Cugnot had built a steam vehicle 30 years previously, but that had been a slow-moving artillery tractor, not built to carry passengers.

== History ==
In 1801, after James Watt's earlier patent on "a carriage propelled by a steam engine" had expired, Richard Trevithick constructed an experimental steam-driven vehicle (Puffing Devil) at Camborne, Cornwall. It was equipped with a firebox enclosed within the boiler, with one vertical cylinder, the motion of the single piston was transmitted directly to the driving wheels by means of connecting rods. It was reported as weighing 1,520 kg (3,350 lb) fully loaded, with a speed of 14.5 km/h (9 mph) on the flat. Trevithick ran this for several hundred yards up a hill with several people hanging on to it. Unfortunately, while the driver and passengers were in a pub celebrating the event, it set fire to a shed in which it had been left unattended, and was destroyed.

The following year, Trevithick and his partner, his cousin Andrew Vivian, patented a steam coach, the patent also describing other uses for Trevithick's new high-pressure engines. The vehicle was assembled at Felton's carriage works at Leather Lane, London, the engine components having been brought from Falmouth where they were made.

In 1831, Trevithick gave evidence to a Parliamentary select committee on steam carriages.

== Description ==
Not all the details of the carriage are known, but the drawings which accompanied the original patent have survived, as have contemporary drawings made by a naval engineer who was sent to examine it. Further information has also been obtained from eyewitness accounts.

The carriage had 8-foot-diameter (2.4 m) driving wheels which were intended to smooth out the road surfaces of the time, to help the fire from being extinguished by shaking. A forked piston rod reduced the distance between the single cylinder and the crankshaft and was considered a singular innovation at the time. Spring-operated valve gear was used to minimise the weight of the flywheel, overcoming one of the drawbacks of industrial steam engines.

The engine had a single horizontal cylinder which, along with the boiler and firebox, was placed behind the rear axle. The motion of the piston was transmitted to a separate crankshaft via the forked piston rod. The crankshaft drove the axle of the driving wheel (which was fitted with a flywheel) via a spur gear. The steam cocks (used to blow out water condensate from the steam chest), the force pump and the firebox bellows were also driven by the crankshaft.

The patent shows two features which may have been incorporated by Trevithick to discourage unlicensed copies: if the engine had been assembled as per the patent drawings it would have been able to run only backwards; and if the water pump had been arranged to be driven by the valve spring as shown, it would have run unevenly if at all.

It is reported that the coach builder William Felton charged £207 for building the coach (not including the engine) and that the cost of transporting the engine from Falmouth to London was £20 14s 11d. The cost of the engine is unknown.

== Operation ==
Following its completion, the London Steam Carriage was driven about 10 miles (16 km) through the streets of London to Paddington and back via Islington, with seven or eight passengers, at a speed of 4–9 miles per hour (6.4–14.5 km/h), the streets having been closed to other traffic.

On a subsequent evening, Trevithick and his colleague crashed the carriage into some house railings and, as a result of this, plus lack of interest in the carriage by potential purchasers, and its demonstrations having exhausted the inventors' financial resources, it was eventually scrapped.

== See also ==
- History of steam road vehicles
