= Manufacturing in the United Kingdom =

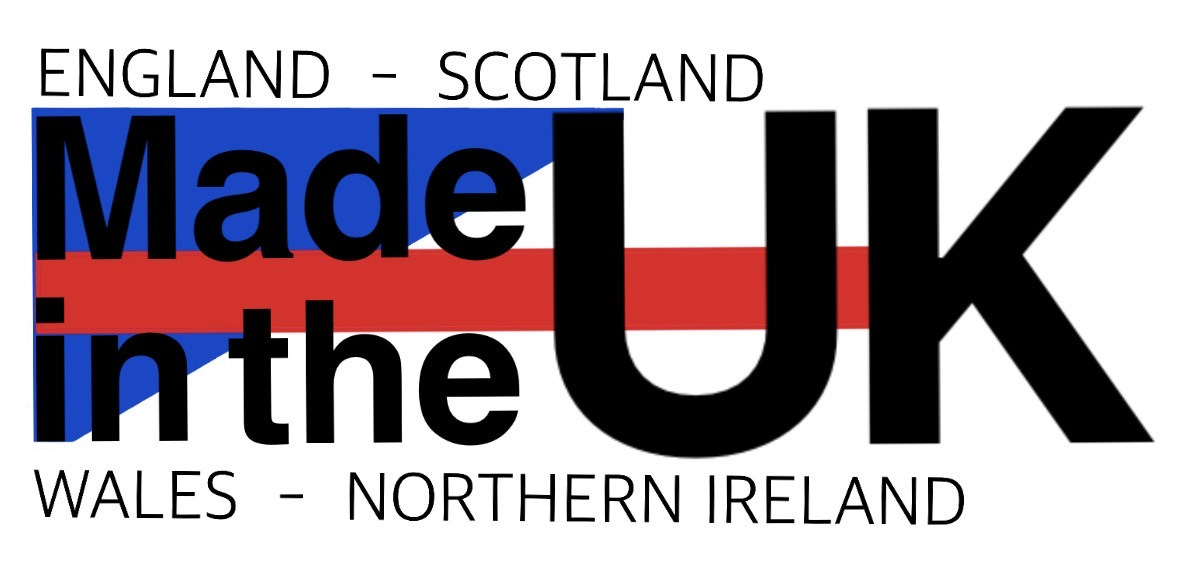
A public domain logo for products made in the UK

The United Kingdom, where the Industrial Revolution began in the late 18th century, has a long history of manufacturing, which contributed to Britain's early economic growth. During the second half of the 20th century, there was a steady decline in the importance of manufacturing and the economy of the United Kingdom shifted toward services. Manufacturing, however, remains important for overseas trade and accounted for 44% of goods exports in 2014. In June 2010, manufacturing in the United Kingdom accounted for 8.2% of the workforce and 12% of the country's national output. The East Midlands and West Midlands (at 12.6 and 11.8% respectively) were the regions with the highest proportion of employees in manufacturing. London's manufacturing sector had the lowest at 2.8%.

In 2024, the United Kingdom had the world's 10th largest manufacturing output and the 4th largest in Europe.

== History ==
Manufacturing in the United Kingdom expanded on an unprecedented scale in the 19th century. Innovation in Britain led to revolutionary changes in manufacturing, the development of factory systems, and growth of transportation by railway and steamship that spread around the world. Its growth was driven by the international trading relationships that Britain developed with parts of Asia, Europe and the Americas, as well as entrepreneurialism, work ethic and the availability of natural resources such as coal. The main sectors were textiles, iron and steel making, engineering, and later shipbuilding. Between 1809 and 1839, exports tripled from £25 million to £76 million, while imports nearly doubled from £28 million to £52 million during the same period; by 1849, exports were £124 million and imports were £79 million. In many industrial sectors, Britain was the largest manufacturer in the world and the most technologically advanced.

In the later part of the 19th century, a second phase developed which is sometimes known as the Second Industrial Revolution. Germany — and later the United States, which made use of the American system of manufacturing — caught up with and overtook Britain as the world's largest manufacturers in the early 20th century. Nonetheless, Britain remained one of the largest industrial producers. By 1948, manufacturing (including utilities and oil and gas extraction) made up 48% of the UK economy. In the post-war decades, manufacturing began to lose its competitive advantage, and heavy industry suffered a relative decline. By 2013, the percentage of manufacturing in the economy (including utilities and oil and gas extraction) had fallen to 13%, replaced by services, which had risen from 46% to 79% over the same period.

The trend of deindustrialisation in the United Kingdom is common to all mature Western economies. Heavy industry, employing many thousands of people and producing large volumes of low-value goods (such as steelmaking) has either become highly efficient (producing the same amount of output from fewer manufacturing sites employing fewer people; for example, productivity in the UK's steel industry increased by a factor of 8 between 1978 and 2006) or has been replaced by smaller industrial units producing high-value goods (such as the aerospace and electronics industries).

How the manufacturing sector is accounted for has however changed as part of manufacturing companies providing services and for those supplying it, so the quoted size of the sector will vary depending on the methodology used.

== Recent trends ==
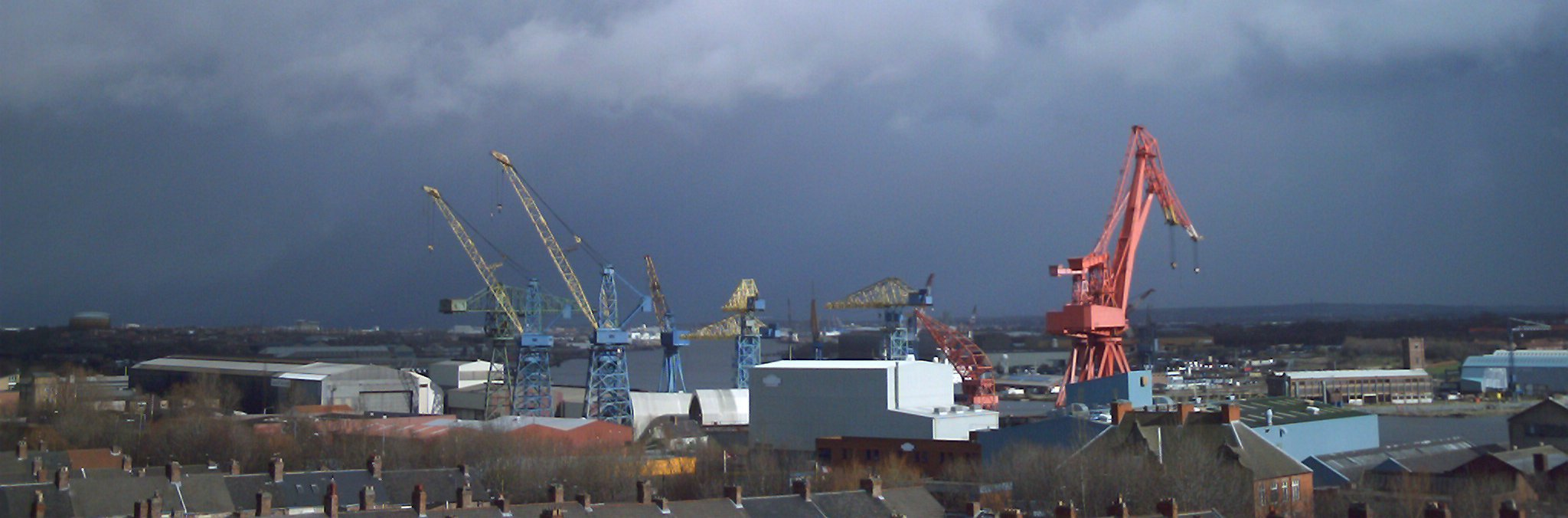
Swan Hunter shipyards in North Tyneside seen in 2007 shortly after closure

Although the manufacturing sector's share of both employment and the UK's GDP has steadily fallen since the 1960s, data from the OECD shows that manufacturing output has steadily increased in terms of both production and value since 1945. A 2009 report from PricewaterhouseCoopers, citing data from the UK Office for National Statistics, stated that manufacturing output (gross value added at 2007 prices) has increased in 35 of the 50 years between 1958 and 2007, and output in 2007 was at record levels, approximately double that in 1958.

Manufacturing employment has fallen faster in the UK since 1998. This started with manufacturing productivity flatlining from 1993 to 1997 and a rise in the pound sterling. PricewaterhouseCoopers presumed that British manufacturing was less able to adapt to new production immune from Asian competition. Since 1993, the UK has also invested less in R&D and adaptation than its OECD competitors. However, manufacturing remains an important sector of the modern British economy, and the UK is one of the most attractive countries in the world for direct foreign industrial investment in 2003.

In 2023 the value of UK manufacturing was £451.6 billion or $588 billion, according to the Office for National Statistics.

More firms returning their production to the UK have bucked the trend, which might continue as many companies reassess their investments in China, a process sometimes known as onshoring.

Manufacturing was mostly stable as a share of national output between 2010 and 2023.

In October 2025, plans by the European Union to extend 50% tariffs on steel imports threatened a substantial impact on the UK steel industry. As the EU accounts for 80% of UK steel exports, the tariffs would likely have a much greater impact than those imposed by the United States. The measures were described as "perhaps the biggest crisis the UK steel industry has ever faced" by Gareth Stace of lobby group UK Steel, and an "existential threat" by Community, a trade union representing steelworkers.

The Purchasing Managers' Index (PMI) of the manufacturing sector was evaluated at 52.5 by S&P Global as of June 2026, which indicated growth. The PMI was rated positively for the eighth month in a row. Director of S&P Global Market Intelligence Rob Dodson attributed this to factories choosing to "safeguard against supply chain disruptions and expected price rises" caused by the 2026 Iran war.

== Engineering ==
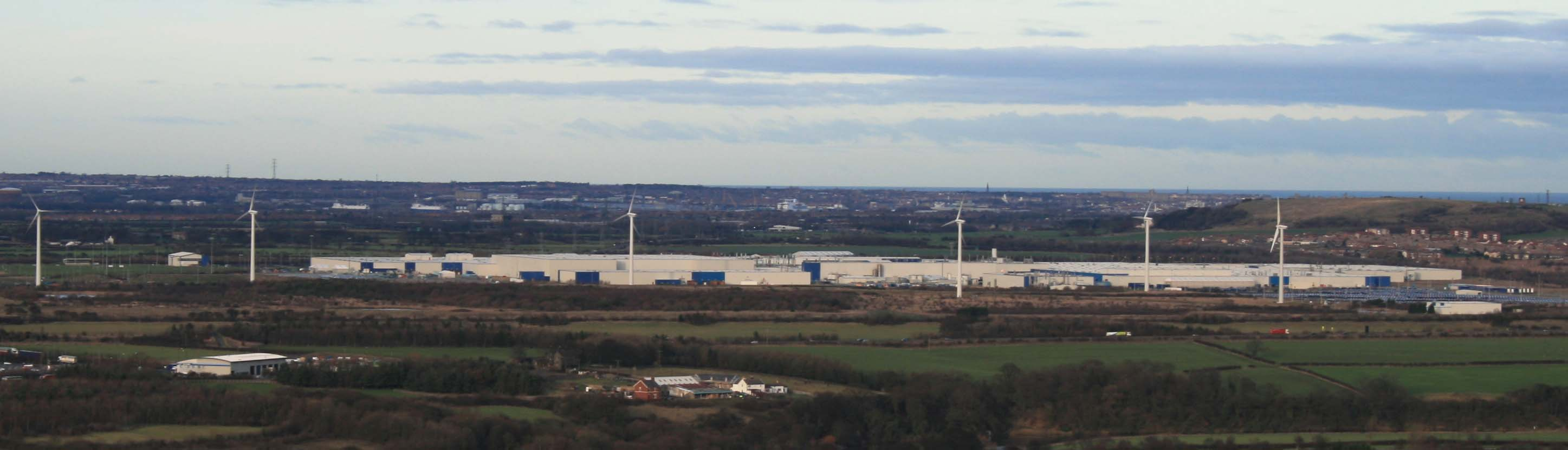
Nissan Motors UK, Sunderland

Engineering and allied industries comprise the single largest sector, contributing 32% of total Gross Value Added in manufacturing in November 2022. Within this sector, transport equipment is the largest contributor, with four major car manufacturers (MINI, JLR, Nissan and Toyota) being present in the UK. These include two British brands, MINI (owned by BMW) and JLR (owned by Tata). Smaller manufacturers include Rolls-Royce (BMW), Bentley (Volkswagen), Aston Martin, Lotus and Morgan. Commercial vehicle manufacturers include Vauxhall Motors (Stellantis), Leyland Trucks (a subsidiary of PACCAR), TEVVA, Alexander Dennis, JCB, Caterpillar, London Electric Vehicle Company and Case-New Holland. The British motor industry also comprises numerous components for the sector, such as Ford's diesel engine plant in Dagenham, which produces half of Ford's diesel engines globally.Triumph Motorcycles Ltd is the only wholly British owned major transport manufacturer.

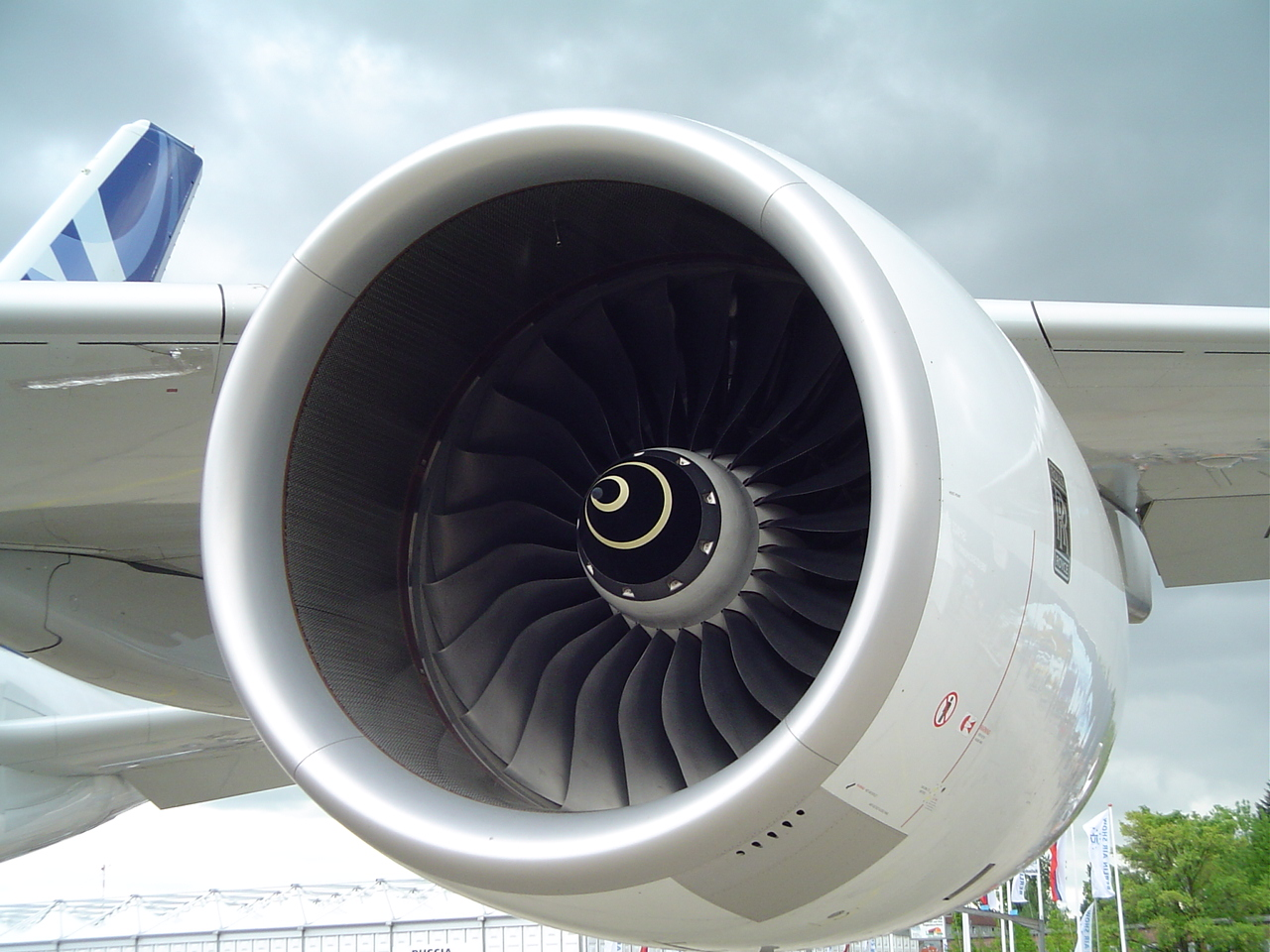
A Rolls-Royce Trent 900 engine on the wing of an Airbus A380

A range of international companies like Alstom, Siemens, Hitachi and CAF manufacture railway locomotives and other related components. Associated with this sector are the defence and aerospace industries. As of 2022, the UK aerospace industry was the second largest in the world behind that of the United States, with a turnover of over $34.5 billion. Major players in the UK defence and aerospace market include BAE Systems, Airbus, Rolls-Royce, Babcock International, GKN Aerospace, Leonardo, Safran, General Electric, MBDA and Thales. BAE Systems and Babcock International are also major builders of warships, operations which constitute a significant part of the UK's remaining marine industrial base. The commercial maritime sector, meanwhile, still includes historic names such as Harland and Wolff, Cammell Laird, and A&P Group, whilst companies such as Princess, Fairline Boats and Sunseeker are large scale manufacturers of private motor yachts.

Another important component of engineering and allied industries is electronics, audio and optical equipment, with the UK having a broad base of domestic firms, alongside a number of foreign firms manufacturing a wide range of TV, radio and communications products, scientific and optical instruments, electrical machinery and office machinery and computers.

Chemicals and chemical-based products are another important contributor to the UK's manufacturing base. Within this sector, the pharmaceutical industry is particularly successful, with the world's second and seventh largest pharmaceutical firms (GlaxoSmithKline and AstraZeneca respectively) being based in the UK and having major research and development and manufacturing facilities there.

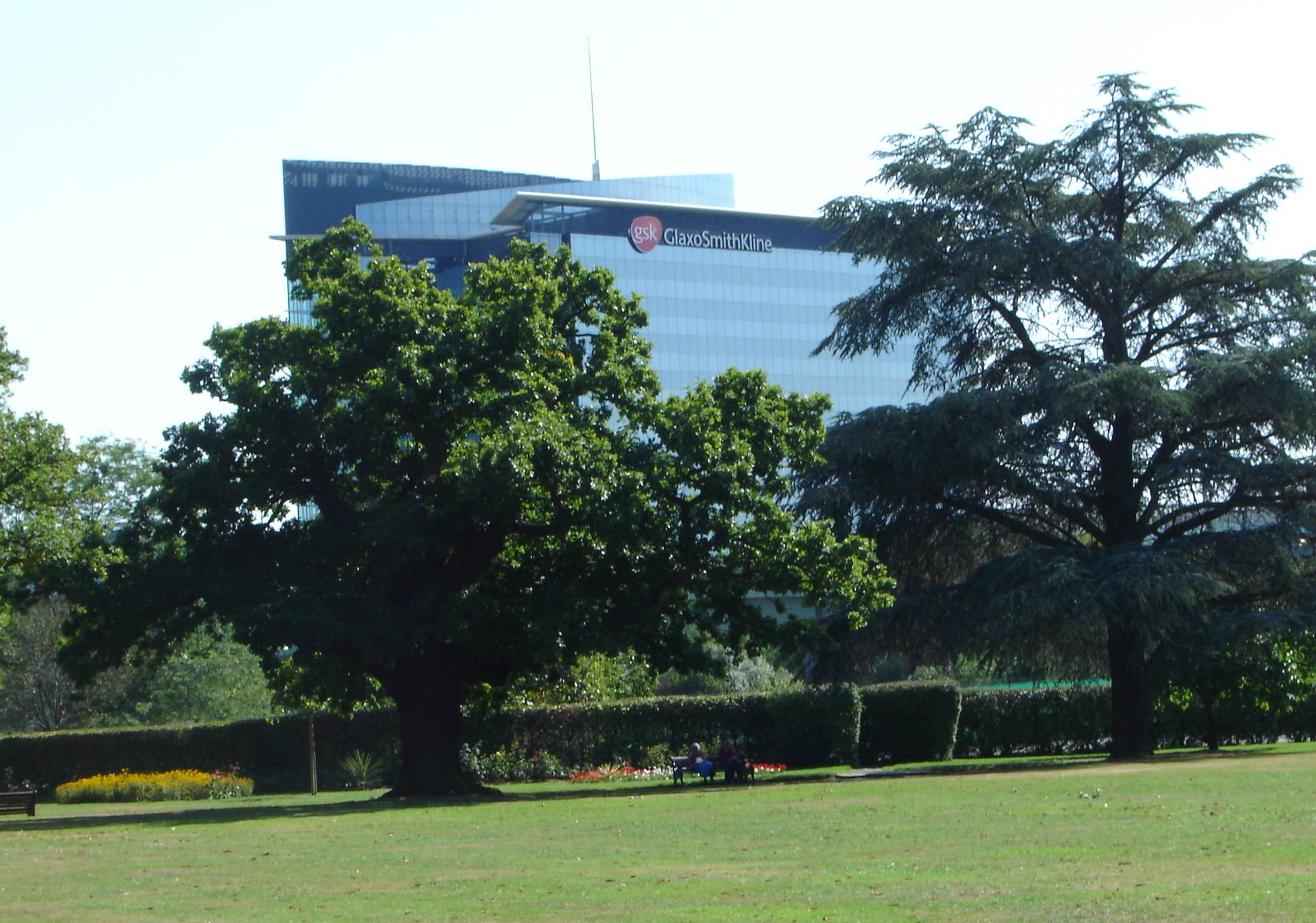
The headquarters of GlaxoSmithKline in Brentford

== Other sectors ==
Other important sectors of the manufacturing industry include food, drink, consumer goods, paper, printing and textiles. Examples of major companies in these industries are Unilever, Diageo, Tate & Lyle and Cadbury.

== See also ==
- Economic history of the United Kingdom
- Nationalization (UK)
- Science and technology in the United Kingdom
- Manufacturing in Wales
