= Tregajorran =

Hamlet in Cornwall, England

Coordinates: 50.2213°N 5.2630°W

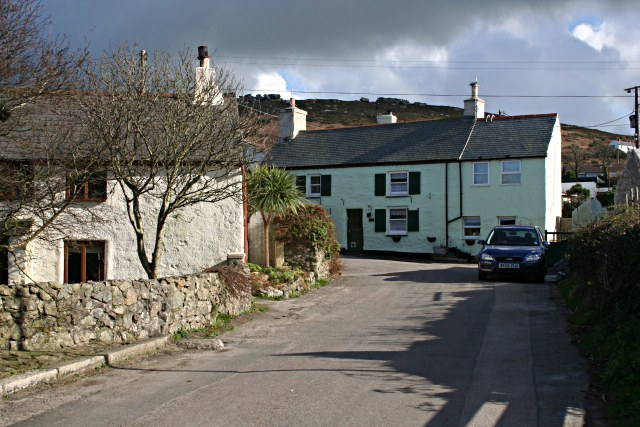
Tregajorran

Tregajorran is a hamlet in Cornwall, England. It is 2.5 miles (4.0 km) southwest of Redruth, in the civil parish of Carn Brea.

== Notable residents ==
Richard Trevithick, inventor and mining engineer, was born in the hamlet (then in the ecclesiastical parish of Illogan).
