= Andrew Vivian =

British mechanical engineer, inventor and mine captain

- Andrew Vivian at the age of 82
- Born: 30 November 1759
- Died: 1842 (aged 82–83)
- Engineering career
- Discipline: Mechanical engineer, Miner, Banker
- Projects: first steam carriage

Andrew Vivian (1759–1842) was a British mechanical engineer, inventor, and mine captain of the Dolcoath mine in Cornwall, England.

In partnership with his cousin Richard Trevithick, the inventor of the "high pressure" steam engine, and the entrepreneur Davis Giddy, Vivian financed the production of the first steam carriage and was granted a joint patent for high pressure engines for stationary and locomotive use in March 1802.

== Early life ==
He was born at Vellansaundry, Camborne on 30 November 1759, the second son of John Vivian and his wife Anne. By 1790, he had set up a business selling supplies to miners. By 1795 he had been appointed as the manager of the Stray Park Mine near Camborne.

In 1798, Vivian became the manager of Dolcoath Mine, and this was where he first worked with Richard Trevithick, who was the mine engineer.

== Work with Trevithick ==
In 1801, Richard Trevithick completed his first full-sized road locomotive in Camborne, demonstrating it to the public on Christmas Eve with Vivian at the controls. The first day it ran about the streets and up the very steep Beacon Hill. The next day it went down to the village of Crane so that Vivian's family, who lived there, might see it. In a further trial, one week later, the machine overturned in a rut. It was dragged into a shed while Trevithick and Vivian had lunch at a nearby inn; on their return the boiler had run dry, setting fire to the machine's timber frame.

A second locomotive was tried in Camborne and, at the beginning of 1803, in London. It was shipped to London in the Little Catherine, a temporary packet commanded by John Vivian (1784–1871), nephew of Andrew Vivian. In August 1803, Mr. Felton, of Leather Lane, London, was paid for building the coachwork. William West assembled the machine, under the supervision of Trevithick and Vivian. It ran successfully, although receiving surprisingly little lasting public attention, but again the state of the road surfaces of the time put paid to the enterprise: the carriage was put out of action with a twisted frame. In the face of this setback Vivian withdrew from the partnership.

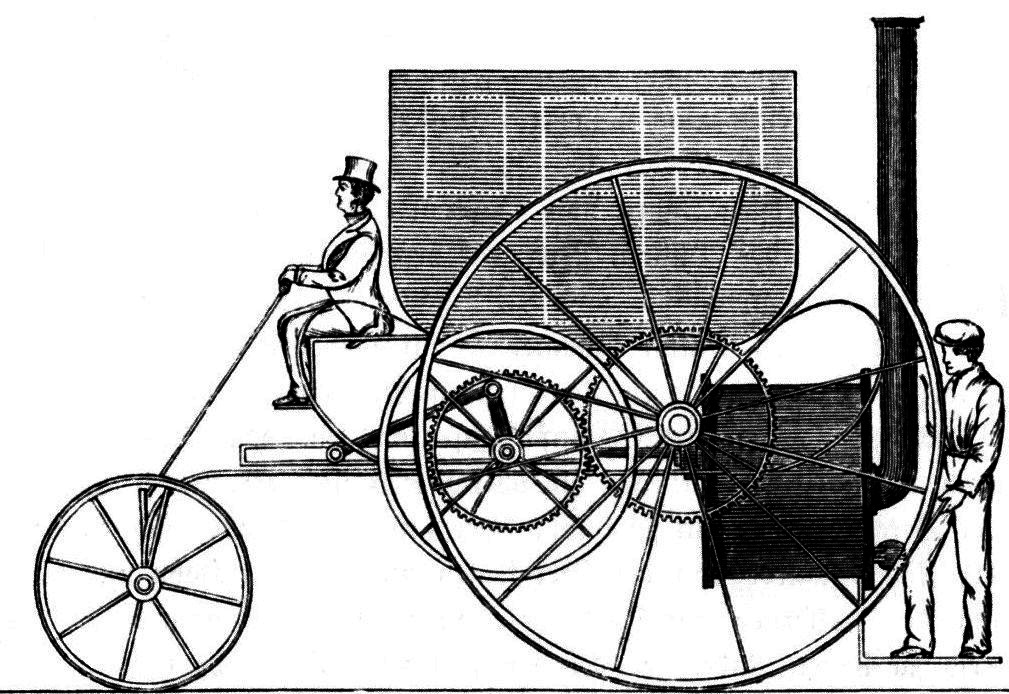
The London Steam Carriage by Trevithick and Vivian, demonstrated in London in 1803.

== Personal life ==
His first wife was Sarah Carbis.

- Andrew Vivian (1787–1805)

His second wife was Frances Knight dau of Stephen Knight of Illogan

- Henry Andrew Vivian of Camborne (bpt 1793) married 1. Mary Lean and 2.Elizabeth Philips
- John Vivian of Townsend (bpt 1797, 3rd son) married Mary Ann Banfield
- Frances Vivian (bpt 1792) married Edward Godfrey Scholey Gurney of Camborne
- Lavinia Vivian (bpt 1801) married William Yewens of Camborne
- Caroline Vivian (bpt 1806) married Rev Thomas Pomery Leigh Yewens
- Richard Glasson Vivian (bpt 1795, d young),
- Charles Vivian (bpt 1805)
- Andrew Vivian of Camborne (d young)
- Julia Vivian

== See also ==
- London Steam Carriage
