= Richard Trevithick =

British inventor and mining engineer (1771–1833)

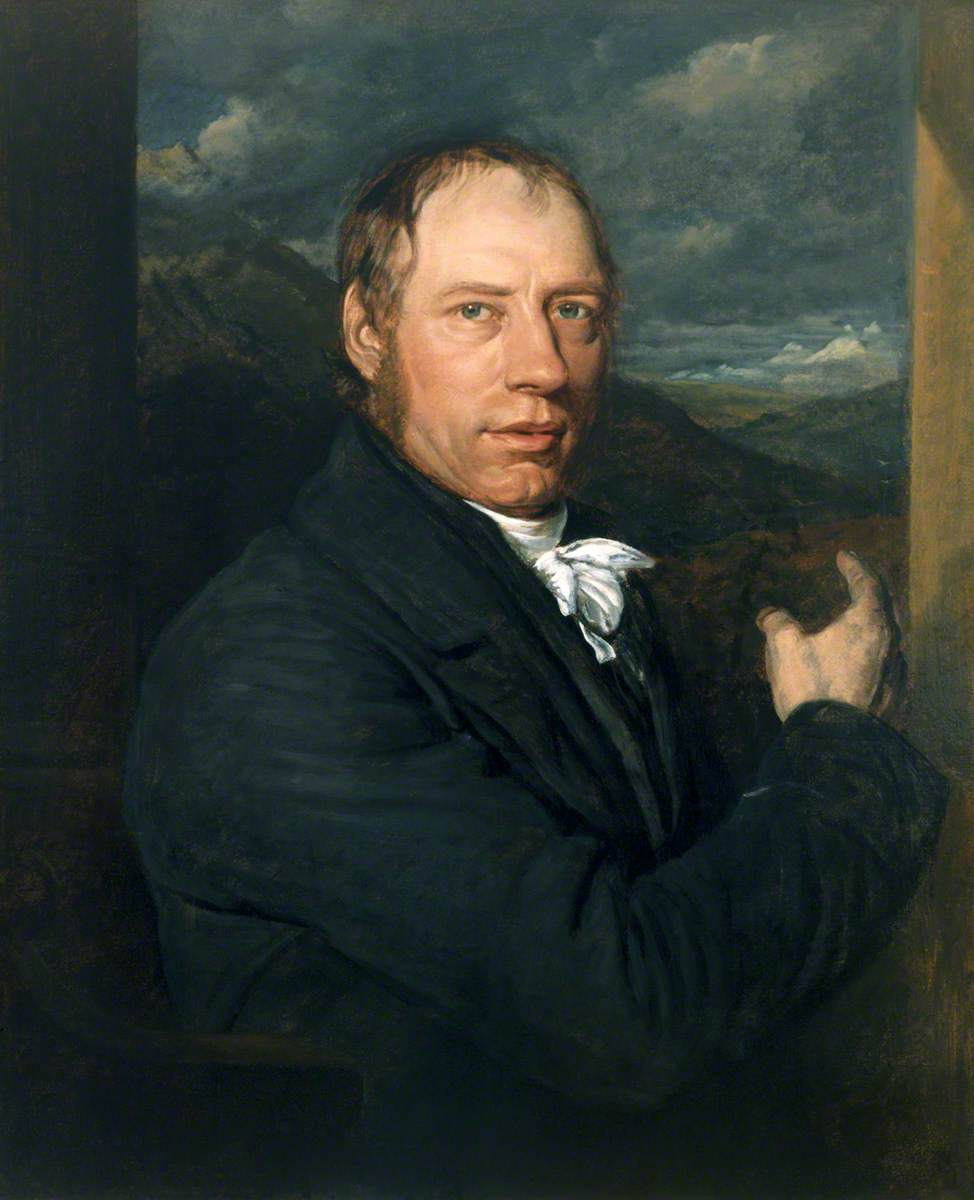
- Portrait by John Linnell, 1816 (Science Museum, London)
- Born: 13 April 1771; Tregajorran, Cornwall, England
- Died: 22 April 1833 (aged 62); Dartford, Kent, England
- Known for: Inventing Steam locomotives
- Scientific career
- Fields: Inventor; mining engineer

Richard Trevithick (13 April 1771 – 22 April 1833) was a British inventor and mining engineer. The son of a mining captain, and born in the mining heartland of Cornwall, Trevithick was immersed in mining and engineering from an early age. He was an early pioneer of steam-powered road and rail transport, and his most significant contributions were the development of the first high-pressure steam engine and the first working railway steam locomotive. The world's first locomotive-hauled railway journey took place on 21 February 1804, when Trevithick's unnamed steam locomotive hauled a train along the tramway of the Penydarren Ironworks, in Merthyr Tydfil, Wales.

Turning his interests abroad Trevithick also worked as a mining consultant in Peru and later explored parts of Costa Rica. Throughout his professional career he went through many ups and downs and at one point faced financial ruin, also suffering from the strong rivalry of many mining and steam engineers of the day. During the prime of his career he was a well-known and highly respected figure in mining and engineering, but near the end of his life he fell out of the public eye.

== Childhood and early life ==
Richard Trevithick was born at Tregajorran (in the parish of Illogan), between Camborne and Redruth, in the heart of one of the rich mining areas of Cornwall. He was the youngest-but-one child and the only boy in a family of six children. He was very tall for the era at 6 ft 2 in (188 cm), as well as athletic and concentrated more on sport than schoolwork. Sent to the village school at Camborne, he did not take much advantage of the education provided; one of his school masters described him as "a disobedient, slow, obstinate, spoiled boy, frequently absent and very inattentive". An exception was arithmetic, for which he had an aptitude, though arriving at the correct answers by unconventional means.

Trevithick was the son of mine "captain" Richard Trevithick (1735–1797) and of miner's daughter Ann Teague (died 1810). As a child he would watch steam engines pump water from the deep tin and copper mines in Cornwall. For a time he was a neighbour of William Murdoch, the steam carriage pioneer, and would have been influenced by Murdoch’s experiments with steam-powered road locomotion.

Trevithick first went to work at the age of 19 at the East Stray Park Mine. He was enthusiastic and quickly gained the status of a consultant, unusual for such a young person. He was popular with the miners because of the respect they had for his father.

Trevithick was extremely strong and was a champion Cornish wrestler.

=== Marriage and family ===
In 1797 Trevithick married Jane Harvey of Hayle. They raised 6 children:

- Richard Trevithick (1798–1872)
- Anne Ellis (1800–1877)
- Elizabeth Banfield (1803–1870)
- John Harvey Trevithick (1807–1877)
- Francis Trevithick (1812–1877)
- Frederick Henry Trevithick (1816–1883)

== Career ==
Jane's father, John Harvey, formerly a blacksmith from Carnhell Green, formed the local foundry, Harveys of Hayle. His company became famous worldwide for building huge stationary "beam" engines for pumping water, usually from mines. Up to this time the steam engines used in mines were of the condensing or atmospheric type, invented by Thomas Newcomen in 1712. James Watt, in partnership with Matthew Boulton, produced what were later known as low-pressure engines. Watt held a number of patents for improving the efficiency of Newcomen's engine—including the "separate condenser patent", which proved the most contentious.

Trevithick became engineer at the Ding Dong Mine in 1797, and there (in conjunction with Edward Bull) he pioneered the use of high-pressure steam. He worked on building and modifying steam engines to avoid the royalties due to Watt on the separate condenser patent. Boulton & Watt served an injunction on him at Ding Dong, and posted it "on the minestuffs" and "most likely on the door" of the Count (Account) House which, although now a ruin, is the only surviving building from Trevithick's time there.

He also experimented with the plunger-pole pump, a type of pump—with a beam engine—used widely in Cornwall's tin mines, in which he reversed the plunger to change it into a water-power engine.

== High-pressure engine ==
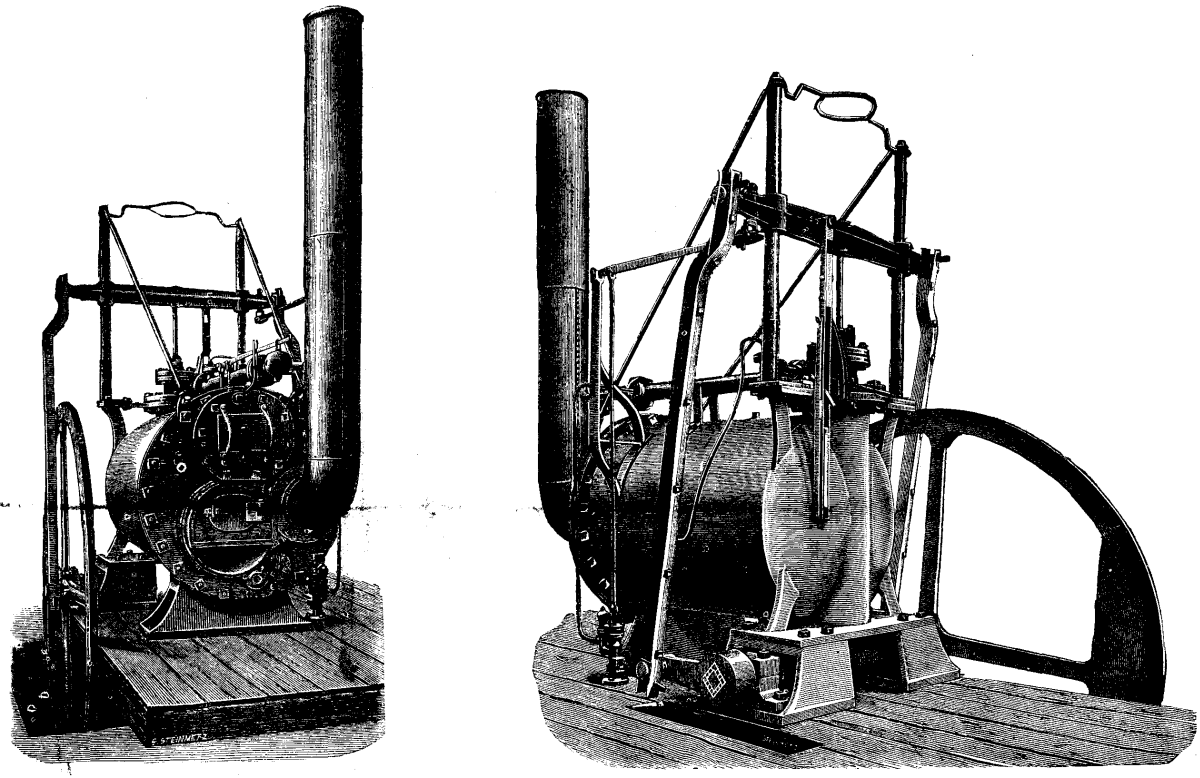
Trevithick's No. 14 engine, built by Hazledine and Company, Bridgnorth, about 1804, and illustrated after being rescued c. 1885; from Scientific American Supplement, Vol. XIX, No. 470, 3 January 1885. This engine is on view at the Science Museum (London).

As his experience grew, he realised that improvements in boiler technology now permitted the safe production of high-pressure steam, which could move a piston in a steam engine on its own account, instead of using near-atmospheric pressure, in a condensing engine. He was not the first to think of so-called "strong steam" or steam of about 30 psi (210 kPa). William Murdoch had developed and demonstrated a model steam carriage in 1784 and demonstrated it to Trevithick, his former next-door neigbour, at his request in 1794.

Oliver Evans in the U.S. had also concerned himself with the concept, but there is no indication that Trevithick knew of his ideas. Independently of this, Arthur Woolf was experimenting with higher pressures whilst working as the Chief Engineer of the Griffin Brewery (proprietors Meux and Reid). This was an engine designed by Hornblower and Maberly, and the proprietors were looking to have the best steam engine in London. Around 1796, Woolf believed he could save substantial amounts of coal consumption.

According to his son Francis, Trevithick was the first to make high-pressure steam work in England in 1799, although other sources say he had invented his first high-pressure engine by 1797. Not only would a high-pressure steam engine eliminate the condenser, but it would allow the use of a smaller cylinder, saving space and weight. He reasoned that his engine could now be lighter, more compact, and small enough to carry its own weight even with a carriage attached (this did not use the expansion of the steam, so-called "expansive working" came later).

=== Early experiments ===
Trevithick began building his first models of high-pressure (meaning a few atmospheres) steam engines – one stationary one and then one attached to a road carriage. A double-acting cylinder was used, with steam distribution by means of a four-way valve. Exhaust steam was vented via a vertical pipe or chimney straight into the atmosphere, thus avoiding a condenser and any possible infringements of Watt's patent. The linear motion was directly converted into circular motion via a crank instead of using a more cumbersome beam.

=== Puffing Devil ===
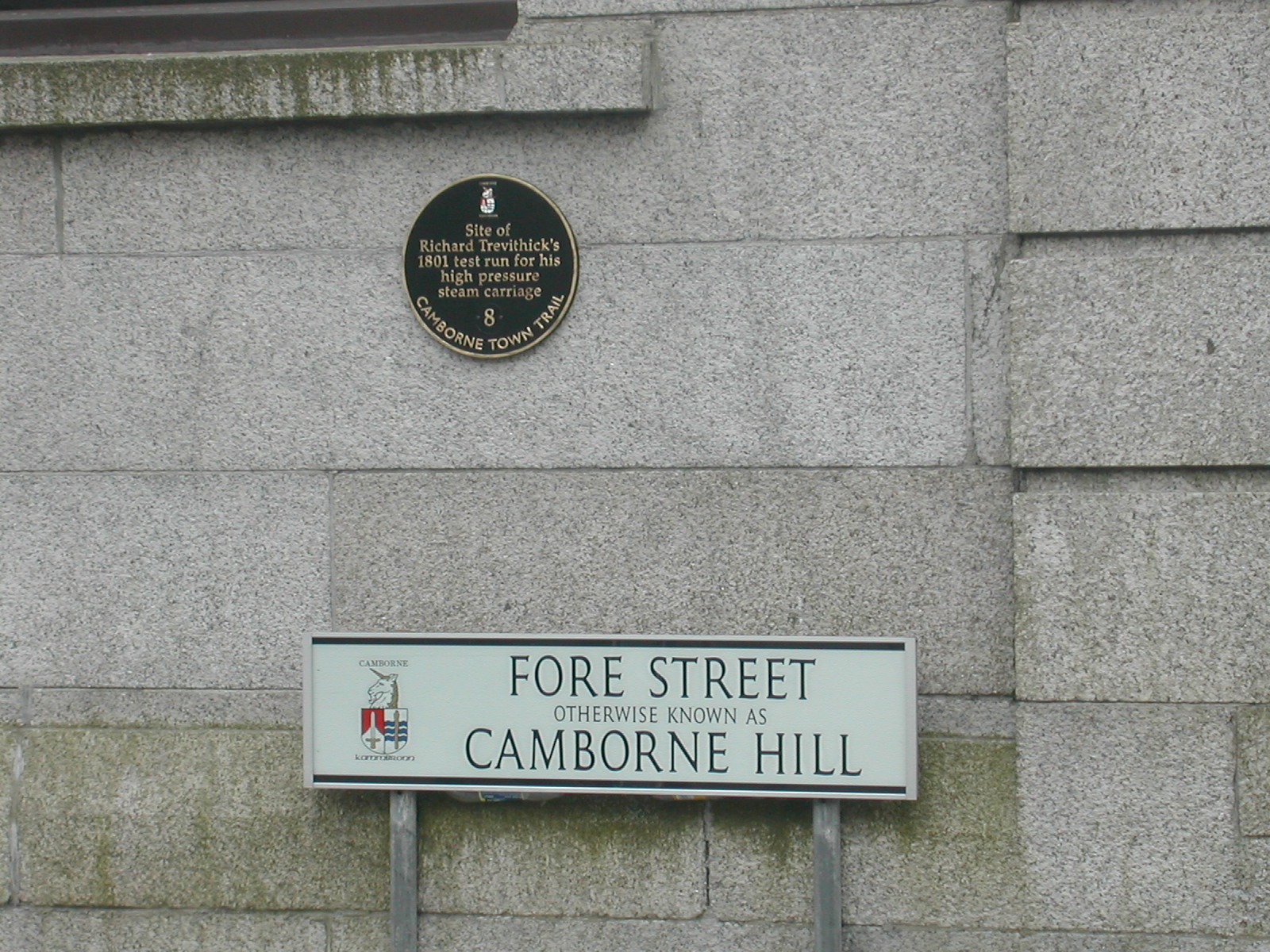
Camborne Hill street name and plaque commemorating Trevithick's steam carriage demonstration in 1801

A replica of Trevithick's Puffing Devil, built by the Trevithick Society and running on Trevithick Day 2017

Trevithick built a full-size steam road locomotive in 1801, on a site near present-day Fore Street in Camborne. (A steam wagon built in 1770 by Nicolas-Joseph Cugnot may have an earlier claim.) Trevithick named his carriage Puffing Devil and on Christmas Eve that year, he demonstrated it by successfully carrying six passengers up Fore Street and continuing on up Camborne Hill, from Camborne Cross, to the nearby village of Beacon. His cousin and associate, Andrew Vivian, steered the machine. It inspired the popular Cornish folk song "Camborne Hill".

During further tests, Trevithick's locomotive broke down three days later after passing over a gully in the road. The vehicle was left under some shelter with the fire still burning whilst the operators retired to a nearby public house for a meal of roast goose and drinks. The boiler went dry, overheating the engine destroying it in a fire. Trevithick did not see this caused by a design flaw, but rather operator error.

In 1802 Trevithick took out a patent for his high-pressure steam engine. To prove his ideas, he built a stationary engine at the Coalbrookdale Company's works in Shropshire in 1802, forcing water to a measured height to measure the work done. The engine ran at forty piston strokes a minute, with an unprecedented boiler pressure of 145 psi (1,000 kPa).

=== Coalbrookdale Locomotive ===
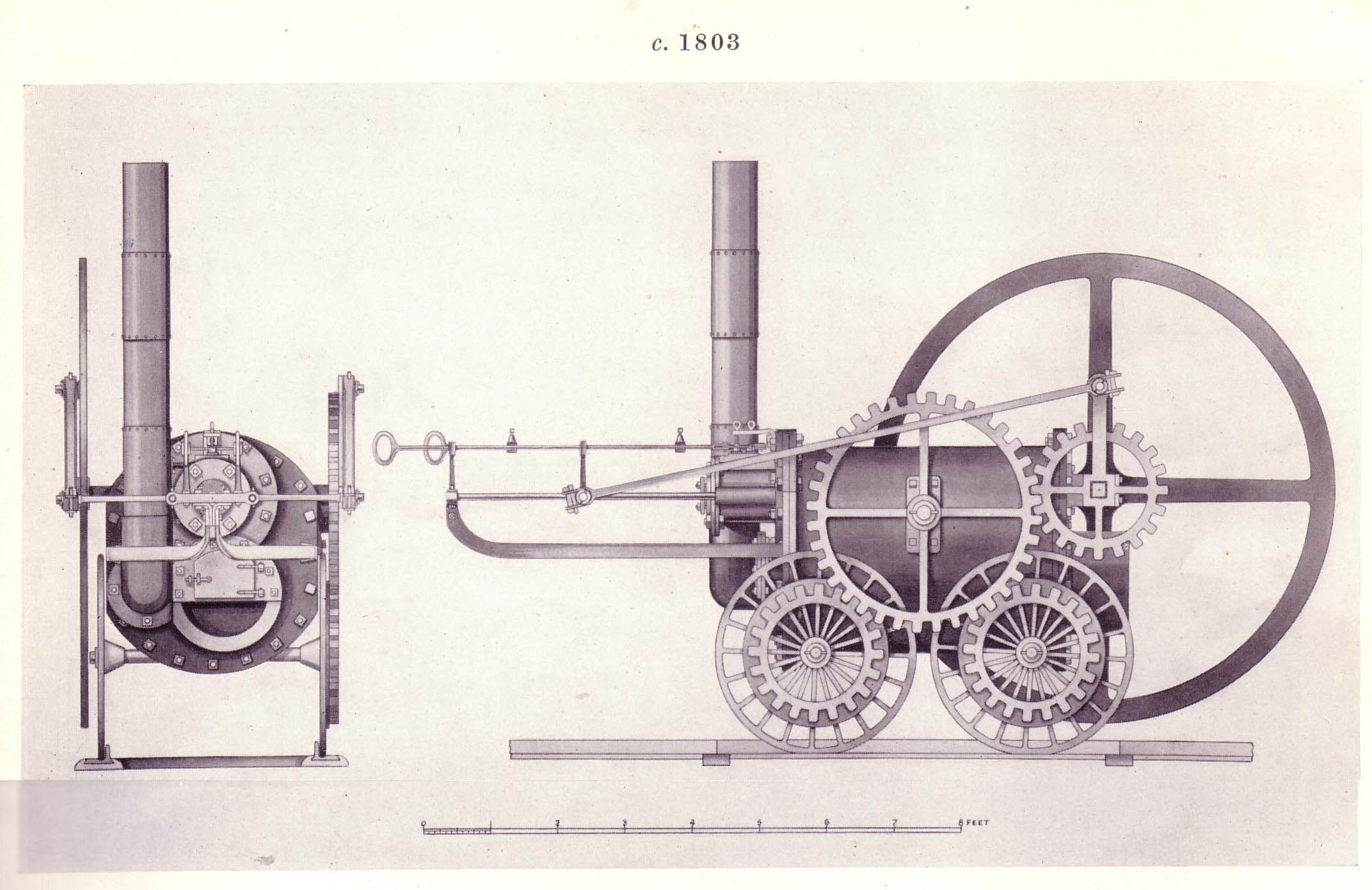
A drawing of the Coalbrookdale locomotive from the Science Museum

In 1802 the Coalbrookdale Company in Shropshire built a rail locomotive for him, but little is known about it, including whether or not it actually ran. The death of a company workman in an accident involving the engine is said to have caused the company to not proceed to running it on their existing railway. To date, the only known information about it comes from a drawing preserved at the Science Museum, London, together with a letter written by Trevithick to his friend Davies Giddy. The design incorporated a single horizontal cylinder enclosed in a return-flue boiler. A flywheel drove the wheels on one side through spur gears, and the axles were mounted directly on the boiler, with no frame. On the drawing, the piston-rod, guide-bars and cross-head are located directly above the firebox door, thus making the engine extremely dangerous to fire while moving. Furthermore, the first drawing by Daniel Shute indicates that the locomotive ran on a plateway with a track gauge of 3 ft (914 mm).

This drawing was used as the basis of all images and replicas of the later "Pen-y-darren" locomotive, as no plans for that locomotive survived.

=== London Steam Carriage ===
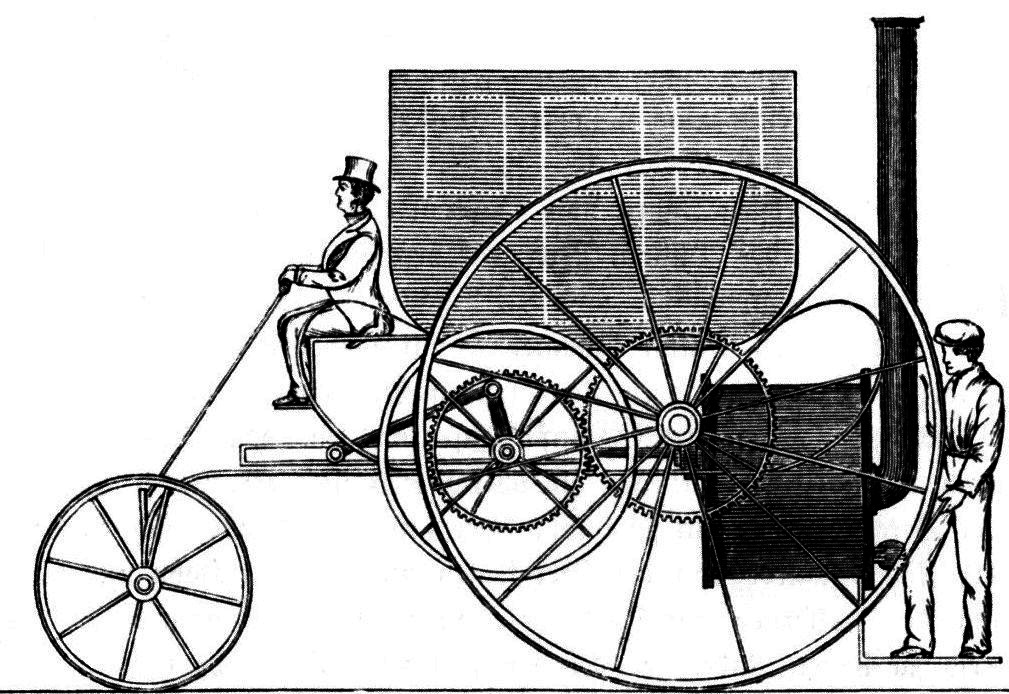
The London Steam Carriage, by Trevithick and Vivian, demonstrated in London in 1803

The Puffing Devil was unable to maintain sufficient steam pressure for long periods, and would have been of little practical use. He built another steam-powered road vehicle in 1803 dubbed the London Steam Carriage, which attracted much attention from the public and press that year when he drove it in London from Holborn to Paddington and back. It was uncomfortable for passengers and proved more expensive to run than a horse-drawn carriage, and was abandoned. In 1831, Trevithick gave evidence to a Parliamentary select committee on steam carriages.

=== Tragedy at Greenwich ===
Also in 1803, one of Trevithick's stationary pumping engines in use at Greenwich exploded, killing four men. Although Trevithick considered the explosion to be caused by careless operation rather than design error, the incident was heavily exploited by James Watt and Matthew Boulton (competitors and promoters of low-pressure engines), who highlighted the perceived risks of using high-pressure steam.

Trevithick's response was to incorporate two safety valves into future designs, only one of which could be adjusted by the operator. The adjustable valve comprised a disc covering a small hole at the top of the boiler above the water level in the steam chest. The force exerted by the steam pressure was equalised by an opposite force created by a weight attached to a pivoted lever. The position of the weight on the lever was adjustable thus allowing the operator to set the maximum steam pressure. Trevithick also added a fusible plug of lead, positioned in the boiler just below the minimum safe water level. Under normal operation the water temperature could not exceed that of boiling water and kept the lead below its melting point. If the water ran low, it exposed the lead plug, and the cooling effect of the water was lost. The temperature would then rise sufficiently to melt the lead, releasing steam into the fire, reducing the boiler pressure and providing an audible alarm in sufficient time for the operator to damp the fire, and let the boiler cool before damage could occur. He also introduced the hydraulic testing of boilers, and the use of a mercury manometer to indicate the pressure.

=== "Pen-y-Darren" locomotive ===
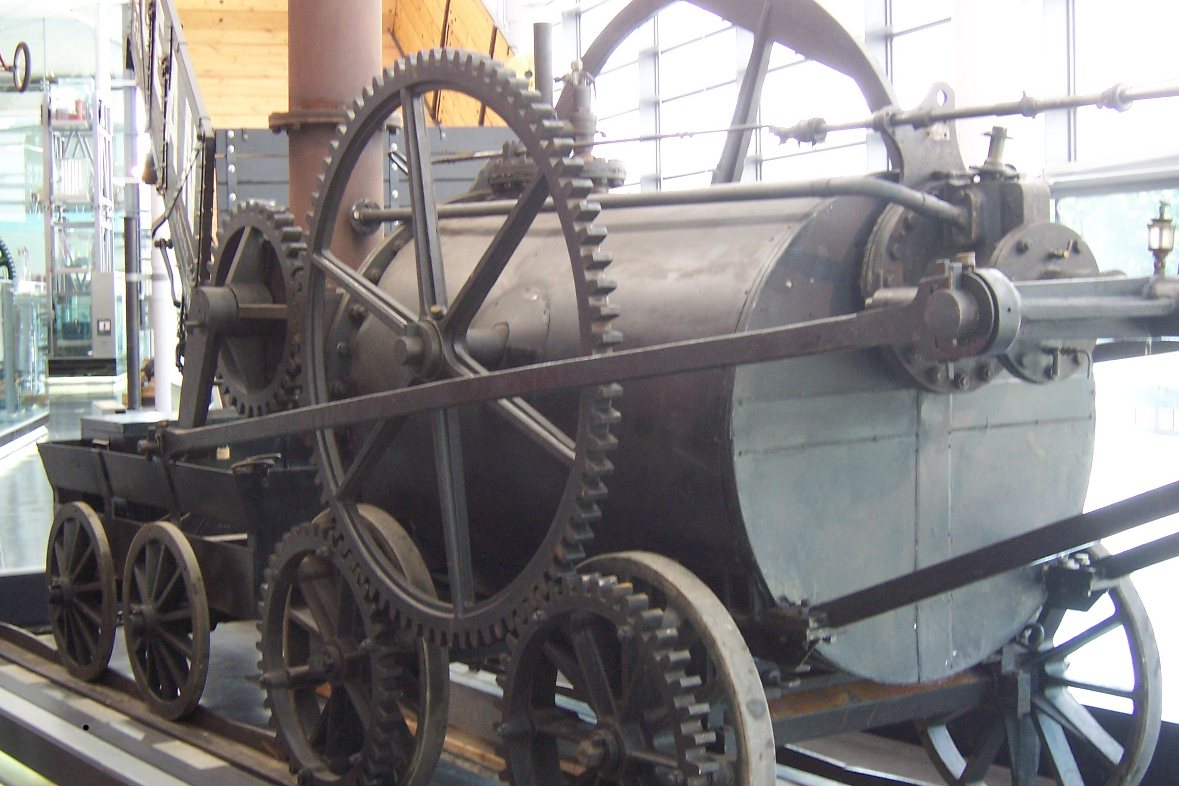
Trevithick's 1804 locomotive. This full-scale reconstruction is in the National Waterfront Museum, Swansea.

In 1802 Trevithick built one of his high-pressure steam engines to drive a hammer at the Penydarren Ironworks in Merthyr Tydfil, Mid Glamorgan. With the assistance of Rees Jones, an employee of the iron works, and under the supervision of Samuel Homfray, the proprietor, Trevithick mounted the engine on wheels and turned it into a locomotive. In 1803, Trevithick sold the patents for his locomotives to Samuel Homfray.

Homfray was so impressed with Trevithick's locomotive that he made a bet of 500 guineas with another ironmaster, Richard Crawshay, that Trevithick's steam locomotive could haul ten tons of iron along the Merthyr Tramroad from Penydarren (51°45′03″N 3°22′33″W) to Abercynon (51°38′44″N 3°19′27″W), a distance of 9.75 miles (15.69 km). On 21 February 1804, amid great interest from the public, it successfully carried 10 tons of iron, five wagons and 70 men the full distance in 4 hours and 5 minutes, at an average speed of approximately 2.4 mph (3.9 km/h). As well as Homfray, Crawshay and the passengers, other witnesses included Mr. Giddy, a respected patron of Trevithick, and an "engineer from the Government". The engineer from the government was probably a safety inspector, who would have been particularly interested in the boiler's ability to withstand high steam pressures.

The configuration of the Pen-y-Darren engine differed from the Coalbrookdale engine. The cylinder was moved to the other end of the boiler so that the fire door was out of the way of the moving parts, which involved putting the crankshaft at the chimney end. The locomotive comprised a boiler with a single return flue mounted on a four-wheel frame. At one end, a single cylinder with very long stroke was mounted partly in the boiler, and a piston rod crosshead ran out along a slidebar. There was only one cylinder, which was coupled to a large flywheel mounted on one side. The rotational inertia of the flywheel would even out the movement that was transmitted to a central cog-wheel that in turn was connected to the driving wheels. It used a high-pressure cylinder without a condenser. The exhaust steam was sent up the chimney, which assisted the draught through the fire, further increasing the engine's efficiency.

Despite heavy scepticism it had been shown that, provided that the gradient was sufficiently gentle, it was possible to successfully haul heavy carriages along a smooth iron road using just the adhesive weight of a suitably heavy and powerful steam locomotive. Trevithick's example was likely the first to do so; however, the locomotive broke some of the tramroad's short cast iron plates because they were only meant to support the lighter axle load of horse-drawn wagons. Consequently, the tramroad returned to horse power after the initial test run. The engine was placed on blocks and reverted to its original stationary job of driving hammers.

A full-scale working reconstruction of the Pen-y-darren locomotive was commissioned in 1981 and delivered to the Welsh Industrial and Maritime Museum in Cardiff. When that closed, the locomotive was moved to the National Waterfront Museum in Swansea. Several times a year, it is run on a 40 m (130 ft) length of railway outside the museum.

=== "Newcastle" locomotive ===
Christopher Blackett, proprietor of the Wylam colliery near Newcastle, heard of the success in Wales and wrote to Trevithick asking for locomotive designs. These were sent to Trevithick's agent John Whitfield at Gateshead, who in 1804 built what was likely the first locomotive to have flanged wheels. Blackett used wooden rails for his tramway, and once again Trevithick's machine was too heavy for its track.

=== Catch Me Who Can ===
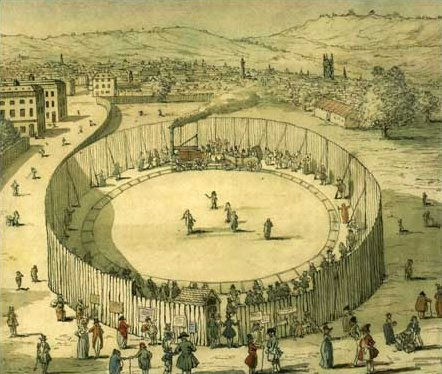
Contemporary (disputed) illustration of the Steam Circus in London, where Catch Me Who Can ran for just a few weeks

In 1808 Trevithick publicised his steam railway locomotive expertise by building a new locomotive called Catch Me Who Can, built for him by John Hazledine and John Urpeth Rastrick at Bridgnorth in Shropshire, and named by Davies Giddy's daughter. The configuration differed from the previous locomotives in that the cylinder was mounted vertically and drove a pair of wheels directly without a flywheel or gearing. This was probably Trevithick's fourth locomotive, after those used at Coalbrookdale, Penydarren ironworks, and the Wylam colliery. He ran it on a circular track just south of the present-day Euston Square tube station in London. The site in Bloomsbury has recently been identified archaeologically as that occupied by the Chadwick Building, part of University College London.

Admission to the Steam Circus was one shilling including a ride and was intended to show that rail travel was faster than by horse. This venture also suffered from weak tracks, and public interest was limited.

Trevithick was disappointed by the response and designed no more railway locomotives. It was not until 1812 that twin-cylinder steam locomotives, built by Matthew Murray in Holbeck, Leeds successfully started replacing horses for hauling coal wagons on the edge railed, rack and pinion Middleton Railway from Middleton colliery to Leeds, West Yorkshire.

== Engineering projects ==
=== Thames tunnel ===
Robert Vazie, another Cornish engineer, was selected by the Thames Archway Company in 1805 to drive a tunnel under the River Thames at Rotherhithe. Vazie encountered serious problems with water influx, and had got no further than sinking the end shafts when the directors called in Trevithick for consultation. The directors agreed to pay Trevithick £1000 (the equivalent of £79,486 in 2025) if he could successfully complete the tunnel, a length of 1,220 feet (370 m). In August 1807, he began driving a small pilot tunnel or driftway 5 feet (150 cm) high tapering from 2 feet 6 inches (76 cm) at the top to 3 feet (91 cm) at the bottom.

By 23 December, after it had progressed 950 feet (290 m), progress was delayed after a sudden inrush of water; and only one month later on 26 January 1808, at 1,040 feet (320 m), a more serious inrush occurred. The tunnel was flooded; Trevithick, being the last to leave, was nearly drowned. Clay was dumped on the river bed to seal the hole, and the tunnel was drained, but mining was now more difficult. Progress stalled, and a few of the directors attempted to discredit Trevithick, but the quality of his work was eventually upheld by two colliery engineers from the North of England. Despite suggesting various building techniques to complete the project, including a submerged cast iron tube, Trevithick's links with the company ceased and the project was never completed.

==== Completion ====
The first successful tunnel under the Thames was started by Sir Marc Isambard Brunel in 1823, 0.75 miles (1,200 m) upstream, assisted by his son Isambard Kingdom Brunel (who also nearly died in a tunnel collapse). Marc Brunel finally completed it in 1843, the delays being due to problems with funding.

Trevithick's suggestion of a submerged tube approach was successfully implemented for the first time across the Detroit River between Michigan in the United States and Ontario in Canada with the construction of the Michigan Central Railway Tunnel, under the engineering supervision of The New York Central Railway's engineering vice president, William J Wilgus. Construction began in 1903 and was completed in 1910. The Detroit–Windsor Tunnel which was completed in 1930 for automotive traffic, and the tunnel under the Hong Kong Harbour were also submerged-tube designs.

=== Return to London ===
Trevithick went on to research other projects to exploit his high-pressure steam engines: boring brass for cannon manufacture, stone crushing, rolling mills, forge hammers, blast furnace blowers as well as the traditional mining applications. He also built a barge powered by paddle wheels and several dredgers.

Trevithick saw opportunities in London and persuaded his wife and four children reluctantly to join him in 1808 for two and a half years lodging first in Rotherhithe and then in Limehouse.

=== Nautical projects ===
In 1808 Trevithick entered a partnership with Robert Dickinson (businessman), a West India merchant. Dickinson supported several of Trevithick's patents. The first of these was the Nautical Labourer; a steam tug with a floating crane propelled by paddle wheels. However, it did not meet the fire regulations for the docks, and the Society of Coal Whippers, worried about losing their livelihood, even threatened the life of Trevithick.

Another patent was for the installation of iron tanks in ships for storage of cargo and water instead of in wooden casks. A small works was set up at Limehouse to manufacture them, employing three men. The tanks were also used to raise sunken wrecks by placing them under the wreck and creating buoyancy by pumping them full of air. In 1810 a wreck near Margate was raised in this way but there was a dispute over payment and Trevithick was driven to cut the lashings loose and let it sink again.

In 1809, Trevithick worked on various ideas on improvements for ships: iron floating docks, iron ships, telescopic iron mast, improved ship structures, iron buoys and using heat from the ships' boilers for cooking.

=== Illness, financial difficulties and return to Cornwall ===
In May 1810 Trevithick caught typhoid and nearly died. By September, he had recovered sufficiently to travel back to Cornwall by ship, and in February 1811 he and Dickinson were declared bankrupt. They were not discharged until 1814, Trevithick having paid off most of the partnership debts from his own funds.

=== Cornish boiler and engine ===
In about 1812 Trevithick designed the ‘Cornish boiler’. These were horizontal, cylindrical boilers with a single internal fire tube or flue passing horizontally through the middle. Hot exhaust gases from the fire passed through the flue thus increasing the surface area heating the water and improving efficiency. These types were installed in the Boulton and Watt pumping engines at Dolcoath and more than doubled their efficiency.

Again in 1812, he installed a new 'high-pressure' experimental condensing steam engine at Wheal Prosper. This became known as the Cornish engine, and was the most efficient in the world at that time. Other Cornish engineers contributed to its development but Trevithick's work was predominant. In the same year he installed another high-pressure engine, though non-condensing, in a threshing machine at the Trewithen Estate, a farm in Probus, Cornwall. It was very successful and proved to be cheaper to run than the horses it replaced. In use for 70 years, it was then retired to an exhibit at the Science Museum. In 2023, the owners of the Trewithen Estate planned to redevelop their farm, which will also involve returning the historic Trevithick steam engine to its original location within the farm.

=== Recoil engine ===
In one of Trevithick's more unusual projects, he attempted to build a 'recoil engine' similar to the aeolipile described by Hero of Alexandria in about AD 50. Trevithick's engine comprised a boiler feeding a hollow axle to route the steam to a catherine wheel with two fine-bore steam jets on its circumference. The first wheel was 15 feet (4.6 m) in diameter and a later attempt was 24 feet (7.3 m) in diameter. To get any usable torque, steam had to issue from the nozzles at a very high velocity and in such large volume that it proved not to operate with adequate efficiency. Today this would be recognised as a reaction turbine.

== South America ==
=== Draining the Peruvian silver mines ===
In 1811 draining water from the rich silver mines of Cerro de Pasco in Peru at an altitude of 4,330 metres (14,210 ft) posed serious problems for the man in charge, Francisco Uville. The low-pressure condensing engines by Boulton and Watt developed so little power as to be useless at this altitude, and they could not be dismantled into sufficiently small pieces to be transported there along mule tracks. Uville was sent to England to investigate using Trevithick's high-pressure steam engine. He bought one for 20 guineas, transported it back and found it to work quite satisfactorily. In 1813 Uville set sail again for England and, having fallen ill on the way, broke his journey via Jamaica. When he had recovered he boarded the Falmouth packet ship 'Fox' coincidentally with one of Trevithick's cousins on board the same vessel. Trevithick's home was just a few miles from Falmouth so Uville was able to meet him and tell him about the project.

=== Trevithick leaves for South America ===
On 20 October 1816 Trevithick left Penzance on the whaler ship Asp accompanied by a lawyer named Page and a boilermaker bound for Peru. He was received by Uville with honour initially but relations soon broke down and Trevithick left in disgust at the accusations directed at him. He travelled widely in Peru acting as a consultant on mining methods. The government granted him certain mining rights and he found mining areas, but did not have the funds to develop them, with the exception of a copper and silver mine at Caxatambo. After a time serving in the army of Simon Bolivar he returned to Caxatambo but due to the unsettled state of the country and presence of the Spanish army he was forced to leave the area and abandon £5,000 worth of ore ready to ship. Uville died in 1818 and Trevithick soon returned to Cerro de Pasco to continue mining. However, the war of liberation denied him several objectives. Meanwhile, back in England, he was accused of neglecting his wife Jane and family in Cornwall.

=== Exploring the isthmus of Costa Rica on foot ===
After leaving Cerro de Pasco, Trevithick passed through Ecuador on his way to Bogotá in Colombia. He arrived in Costa Rica in 1822 hoping to develop mining machinery. He spent time looking for a practical route to transport ore and equipment, settling on using the San Juan River, the Sarapiqui River, and then a railway to cover the remaining distance. In a biography his son wrote that Trevithick had in mind a steam-driven railway and not mule-driven.

The initial party comprised Trevithick, Scottish mining projector James Gerard, two schoolboys: José Maria Montealegre (a future president of Costa Rica) and his brother Mariano, whom Gerard intended to enrol at a small boarding school at Lauderdale House in Highgate (where Trevithick later made his temporary London home), and seven natives, three of whom returned home after guiding them through the first part of their journey. The journey was treacherous – one of the party was drowned in a raging torrent and Trevithick was nearly killed on at least two occasions. In the first he was saved from drowning by Gerard, and in the second he was nearly devoured by an alligator following a dispute with a local man whom he had in some way offended. Still in the company of Gerard, he made his way to Cartagena where he chanced to meet Robert Stephenson who was himself on his way home from Colombia, following a failed three-year mining venture. It had been many years since they last met (when Stephenson was just a baby), and the two men were judged by witnesses to their meeting to have little in common. Despite this Stephenson gave Trevithick £50 to help his passage home. Whilst Stephenson and Gerard booked passage via New York, Trevithick took ship direct to Falmouth, arriving there in October 1827 with few possessions other than the clothes he was wearing. He never returned to Costa Rica.

== Later projects ==
Taking encouragement from earlier inventors who had achieved some successes with similar endeavours, Trevithick petitioned Parliament for a grant, but he was unsuccessful in acquiring one.

In 1829 he built a closed cycle steam engine followed by a vertical tubular boiler.

In 1830 he invented an early form of storage room heater. It comprised a small fire tube boiler with a detachable flue which could be heated either outside or indoors with the flue connected to a chimney. Once hot the hot water container could be wheeled to where heat was required and the issuing heat could be altered using adjustable doors.

To commemorate the passing of the Reform Bill in 1832 he designed a massive column to be 1,000 feet (300 m) high, being 100 feet (30 m) in diameter at the base tapering to 12 feet (3.7 m) at the top where a statue of a horse would have been mounted. It was to be made of 1500 10-foot-square (3 m) pieces of cast iron and would have weighed 6,000 long tons (6,100 t; 6,700 short tons). There was substantial public interest in the proposal, but it was never built.

=== Final project ===
About the same time he was invited to do some development work on an engine of a new vessel at Dartford by John Hall, the founder of J & E Hall Limited. The work involved a reaction turbine for which Trevithick earned £1200. He lodged at The Bull hotel in the High Street, Dartford, Kent.

== Death ==
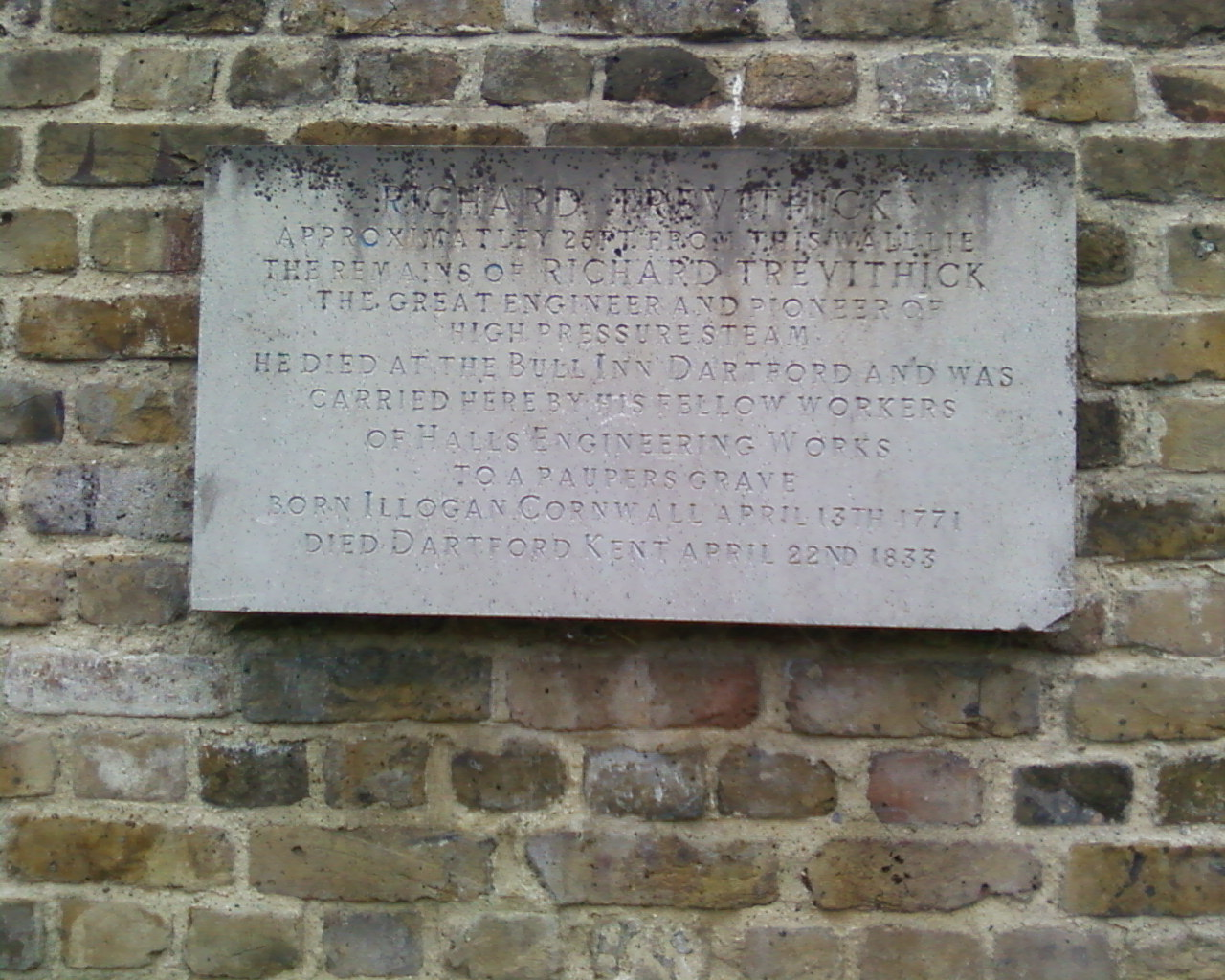
The plaque at St Edmund's Burial Ground, East Hill, Dartford. With the words "Richard Trevithick. Approximately 25ft from this wall lie the remains of Richard Trevithick. The great engineer and pioneer of high-pressure steam. He died at the Bull Inn, Dartford and was carried here by fellow workers of Halls Engineering Works. To a paupers grave. Born Illogan, Cornwall April 13th 1771. Died Dartford, Kent April 22nd 1833".

After he had been working in Dartford for about a year, Trevithick was taken ill with pneumonia and had to retire to bed at the Bull Hotel, where he was lodging at the time. Following a week's confinement in bed he died on the morning of 22 April 1833. He was penniless, and no relatives or friends had attended his bedside during his illness. His colleagues at Hall's works made a collection for his funeral expenses and acted as bearers. They also paid a night watchman to guard his grave at night to deter grave robbers, as body snatching was common at that time.

Trevithick was buried in an unmarked grave in St Edmund's Burial Ground, East Hill, Dartford. The burial ground closed in 1857, with the gravestones being removed in 1956–57. A plaque marks the approximate spot believed to be the site of the grave. The plaque lies on the side of the park, near the East Hill gate, and an unlinked path.

=== Memorials ===
In Camborne, outside the public library, a statue by Leonard Stanford Merrifield depicting Trevithick holding one of his small-scale models was unveiled in 1932 by Prince George, Duke of Kent, in front of a crowd of thousands of local people.

On 17 March 2007, Dartford Borough Council invited the Chairman of the Trevithick Society, Phil Hosken, to unveil a Blue plaque at the Royal Victoria and Bull hotel (formerly The Bull) marking Trevithick's last years in Dartford and the place of his death in 1833. The Blue Plaque is prominently displayed on the hotel's front facade. There is also a plaque at Holy Trinity Church, Dartford.

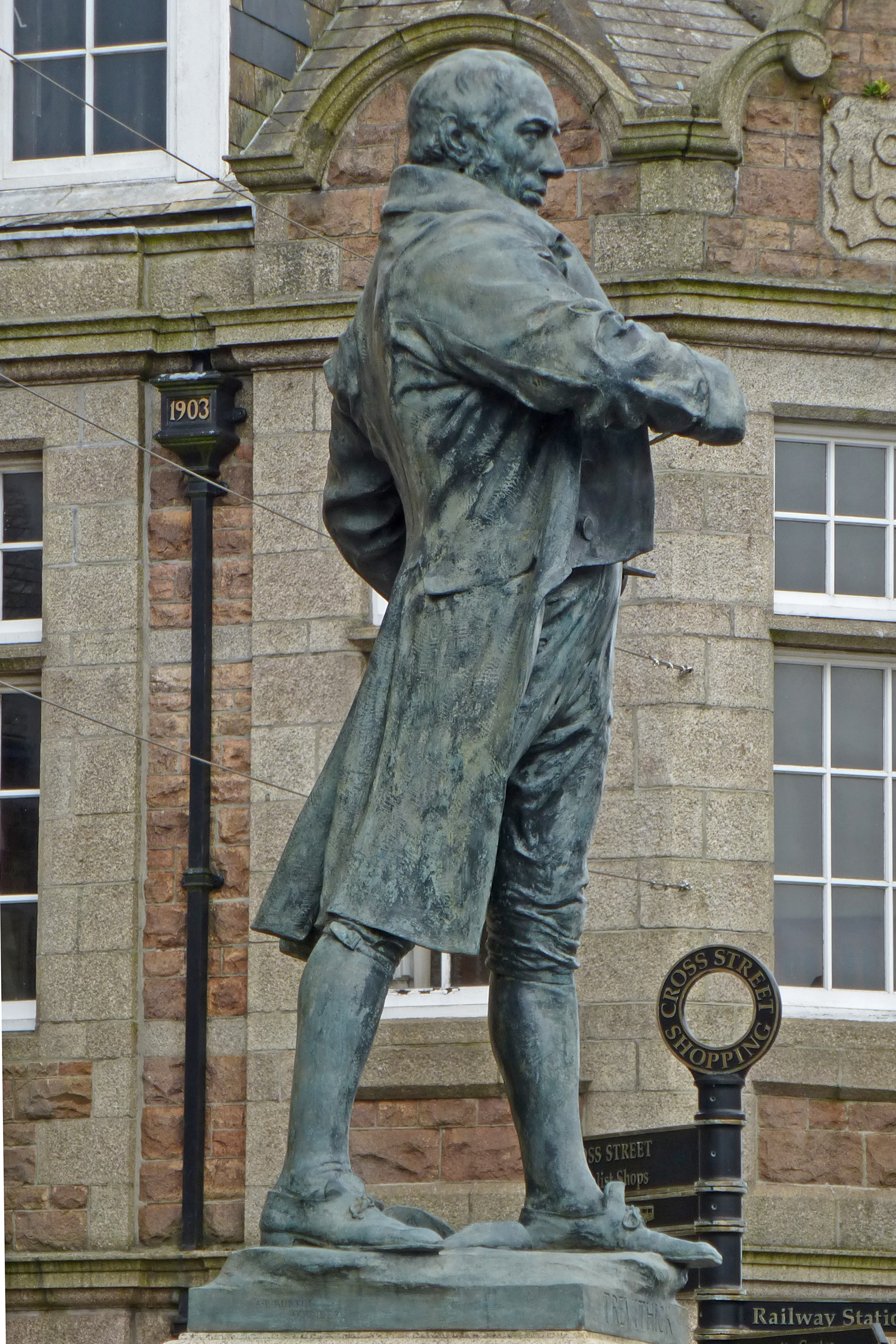
Trevithick's statue by the public library at Camborne, Cornwall

The Cardiff University Engineering, Computer Science and Physics departments are based around the Trevithick Building which also holds the Trevithick Library, named after Richard Trevithick.

In Gower Street in London, on the wall of the University College building, an elaborate wall plaque carries the legend: "Close to this place Richard Trevithick (Born 1771 – Died 1833) Pioneer of High Pressure Steam ran in the year 1808 the first steam locomotive to draw passengers." It was erected by "The Trevithick Centenary Memorial Committee".

One of the oldest depictions of Saint Piran's Flag can be seen in a stained glass window at Westminster Abbey, 1888, commemorating Richard Trevithick. The window depicts St Michael at the top and nine Cornish saints, Piran, Petroc, Pinnock, Germanus, Julian, Cyriacus, Constantine, Nonna and Geraint in tiers below. The head of St Piran appears to be a portrait of Trevithick himself and the figure carries the banner of Cornwall.

There is a plaque and memorial situated in Abercynon, outside the fire station. It says "In commemoration of the achievements of Richard Trevithick who having constructed the first steam locomotive did on February 21st 1804 successfully hail 10 tons of iron and numerous passengers along a tramroad from Merthyr to this precinct where was situated the loading point of the Glamorgan Canal". There is also a building in Abercynon called Ty Trevithick (Trevithick House), named in his honour.

On Penydarren Road, Merthyr Tydfil there is a memorial on the site of the Penydarren Tramway. The inscription reads "RICHARD TREVITHICK 1771-1833 PIONEER OF HIGH PRESSURE STEAM BUILT THE FIRST STEAM LOCOMOTIVE TO RUN ON RAILS. ON FEBRUARY 21ST 1804 IT TRAVERSED THE SPOT ON WHICH THIS MONUMENT STANDS ON ITS WAY TO ABERCYNON". A short walk north of that is the (slightly misspelled) Trevethick Street, named after Trevithick.

A replica of Trevithick's first full-size steam road locomotive was first displayed at Camborne Trevithick Day 2001, the day chosen for the celebration of Trevithick's public demonstration of the use of high-pressure steam. The team consisting of John Woodward, Mark Rivron and Sean Oliver, have continued to maintain and display the engine at various steam fairs across the country. The Puffing Devil has proudly led the parade of steam engines at every subsequent Trevithick day up to and including 2014.

Trevithick Drive in Temple Hill, Dartford, was named after Richard Trevithick.

==== Legacy ====
The Trevithick Society, a successor to industrial archaeology organisations that were initially formed to rescue the Levant winding engine from being scrapped, was named in honor of Richard Trevithick. They publish a newsletter, a journal and many books on Cornish engines, the mining industry, engineers, and other industrial archaeological topics.

The active Trevithick Society is not to be confused with the former Trevithick Trust, registered by the Charity Commission in 1994 and removed (ceased to exist) in 2006. The Trevithick Trust attracted grants and did work at various sites in Cornwall, including King Edward Mine.

There is also a street named after Trevithick in Merthyr Tydfil.

Richard Trevithick is celebrated in Camborne, Cornwall on Trevithick Day which is held annually on the last Saturday in April. The day is a community festival with steam engines from all over the UK attending. Towards the end of the day they parade through the streets of Camborne and steam past a statue of Richard Trevithick outside the Passmore Edwards building.

Harry Turtledove's alternate history short story "The Iron Elephant" has a character named Richard Trevithick inventing a steam engine in 1782 and subsequently racing a woolly mammoth-drawn train that it would in time come to supplant. The character was born sometime before 1771, and is American rather than British, indicating he is an analog, rather than the historical figure.

== See also ==
- List of topics related to Cornwall
